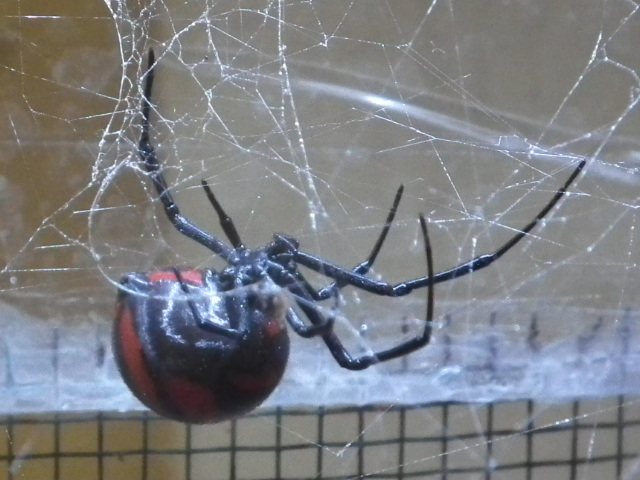

Scientific classification
- Kingdom: Animalia
- Phylum: Arthropoda
- Subphylum: Chelicerata
- Class: Arachnida
- Order: Araneae
- Infraorder: Araneomorphae
- Family: Theridiidae
- Genus: Latrodectus
- Species: L. corallinus

Binomial name
- Latrodectus corallinus Ábalos, 1980

Synonyms
- Latrodectus no. 2 Abalos & Báez, 1967; Latrodectus garbae Rueda & Realpe, 2021

= Latrodectus corallinus =

Species of spider

Latrodectus corallinus is approximately 12 millimetres (0.47 in) in size, and is primarily black with large, red markings on its abdomen, as well as a red, square-like ring under its abdomen.

== Distribution and habitat ==
Latrodectus corallinus is found in Argentina, Brazil, Colombia (junior synonym of L. garbae) and Panama.

It is found both outdoors and indoors, and is commonly found in agricultural fields.

== Description and diagnosis ==
Male and female display dorsal red markings on black background.

Identification: the egg-sac has fragile silk pompoms and both male and female may display a square ventral marking with a central circular black area (the lack of this area is not a discrimination feature)

== Habits ==
Latrodectus corallinus, like most species of Latrodectus, is not aggressive. The peak time of activity for Latrodectus corallinus is between the months of December and March (summer in the Southern Hemisphere).
