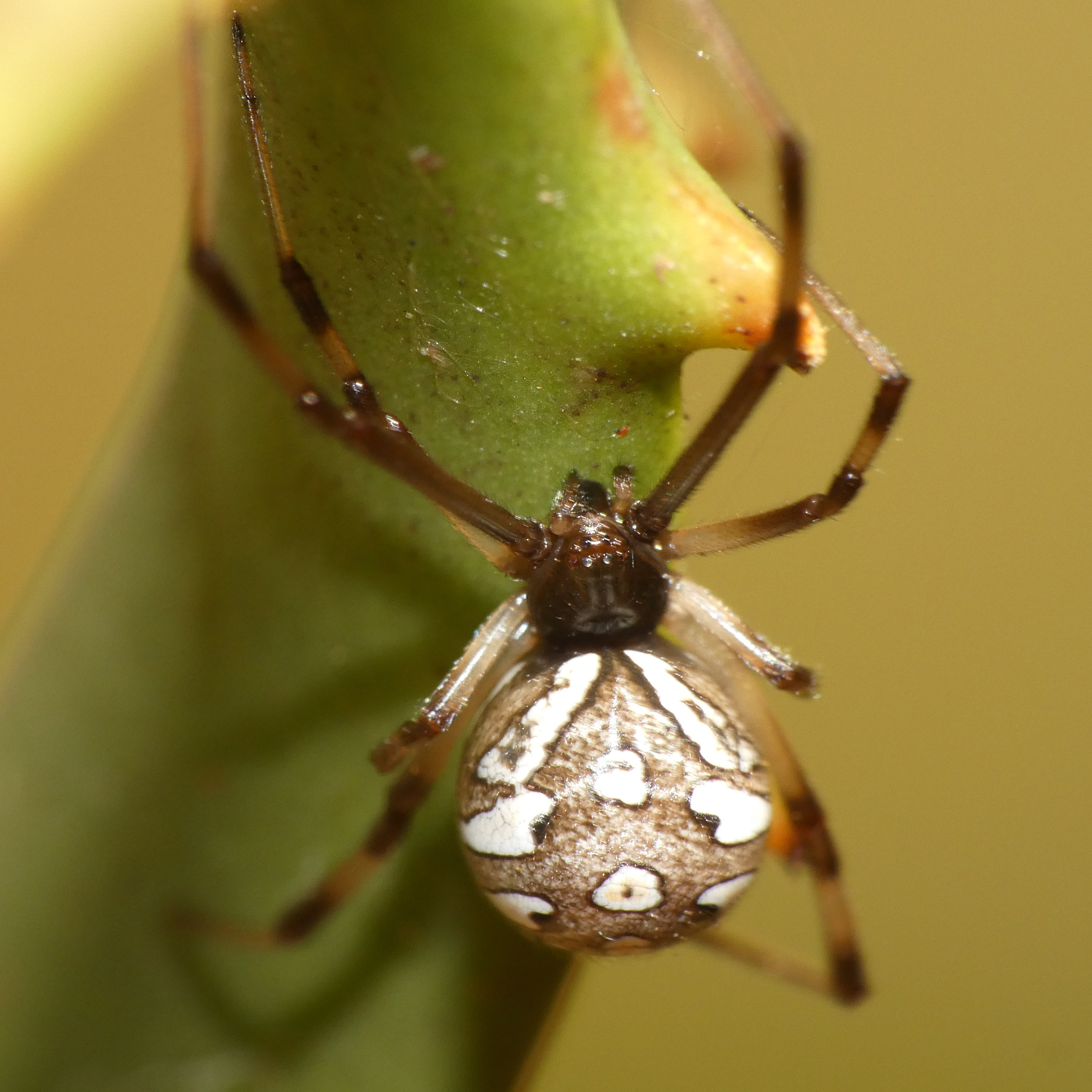
- Female from Zimbabwe
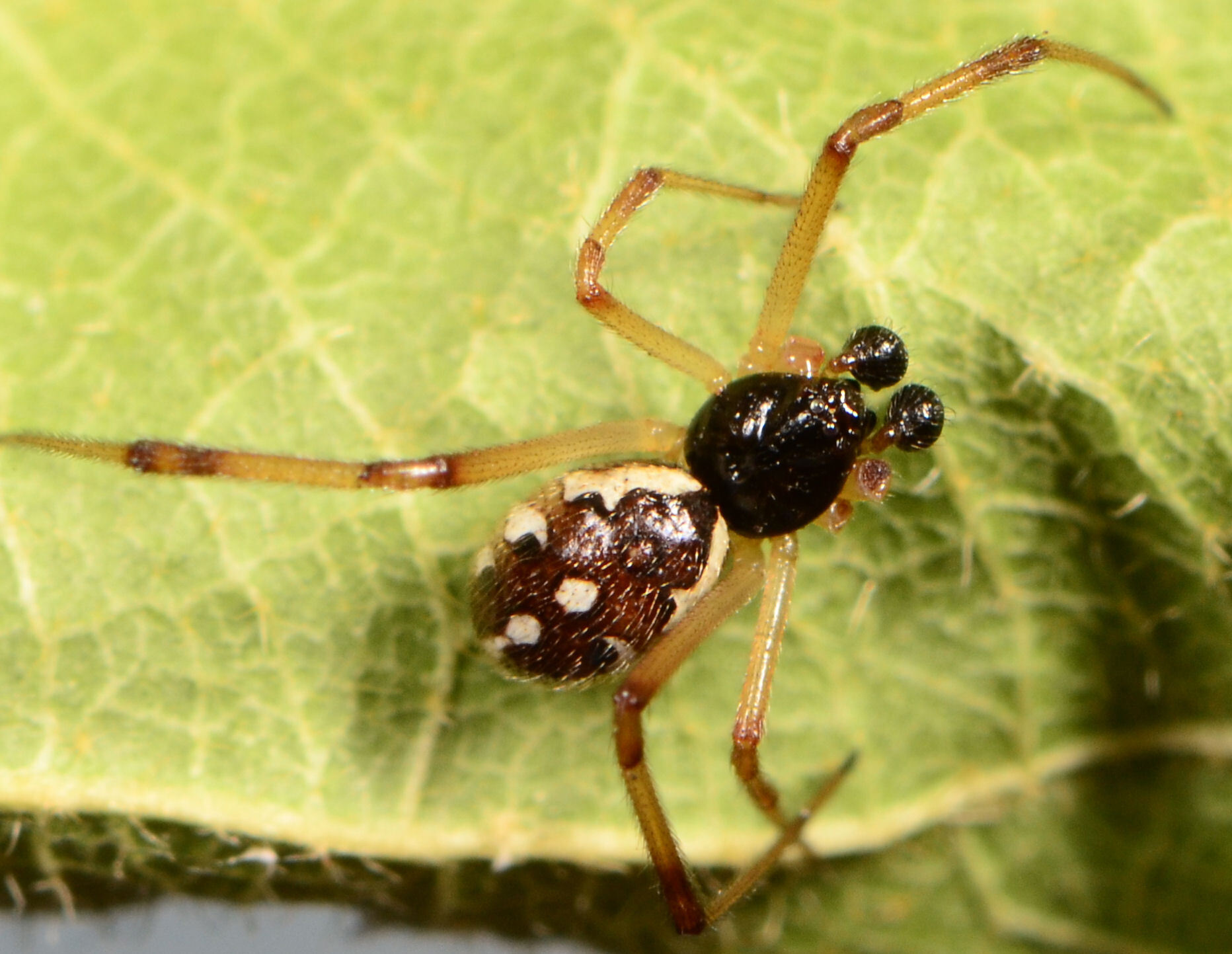
- Male from South Africa

Scientific classification
- Kingdom: Animalia
- Phylum: Arthropoda
- Subphylum: Chelicerata
- Class: Arachnida
- Order: Araneae
- Infraorder: Araneomorphae
- Family: Theridiidae
- Genus: Latrodectus
- Species: L. rhodesiensis

Binomial name
- Latrodectus rhodesiensis Mackay, 1972

= Latrodectus rhodesiensis =

Species of spider

Latrodectus rhodesiensis is a species of spider in the family Theridiidae, found in southern Africa. It is one of six species of Latrodectus found in southern Africa, two of which, including L. rhodesiensis, are known as brown button or brown widow spiders.

== Distribution ==
Latrodectus rhodesiensis is found in Namibia, Botswana, Zimbabwe, and South Africa.

In South Africa, the species has been recorded from the provinces Free State, Gauteng, Limpopo, and Western Cape. Notable locations include Roodeplaatdam Nature Reserve and Stellenbosch.

== Habitat and ecology ==
This species lives in a web constructed low in vegetation similar to Latrodectus geometricus. The egg sac of L. rhodesiensis differs from that of other African species. It is smooth, spherical, and dirty white in colour, pure white when first constructed. The smooth egg sac consists of an inner pear-shaped thin-walled sac approximately half the diameter of the complete structure, surrounded by a layer of fluffy threads.

Latrodectus rhodesiensis inhabits areas at altitudes from 982 to 1651 m above sea level. The species has been sampled from the Grassland and Savanna biomes.

== Venom ==
Like all Latrodectus species, L. rhodesiensis has a neurotoxic venom. It acts on nerve endings, causing the very unpleasant symptoms of latrodectism when humans are bitten, although brown button spiders are not generally as venomous as black button or black widow spiders, such as L. indistinctus.

== Description ==
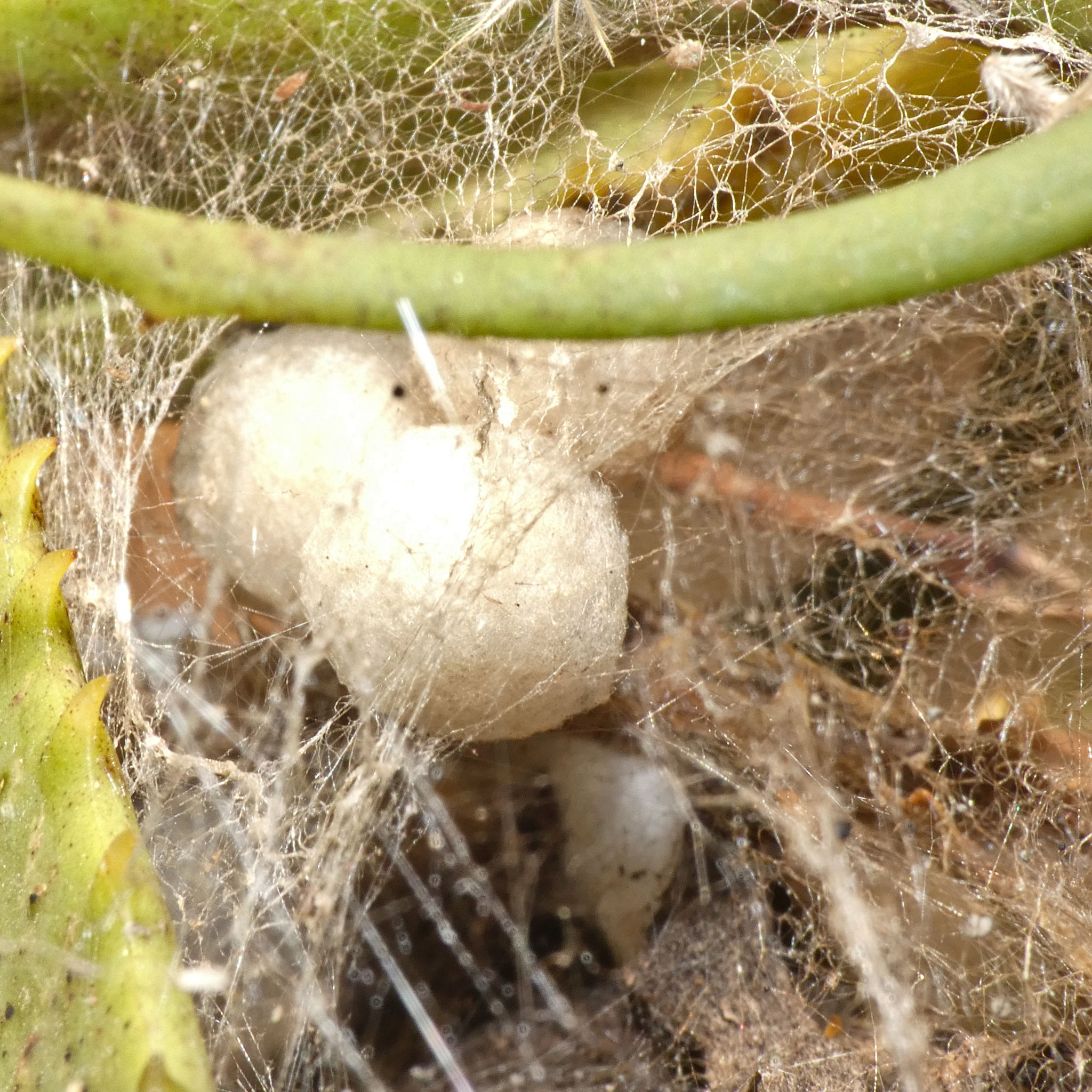
egg sacs

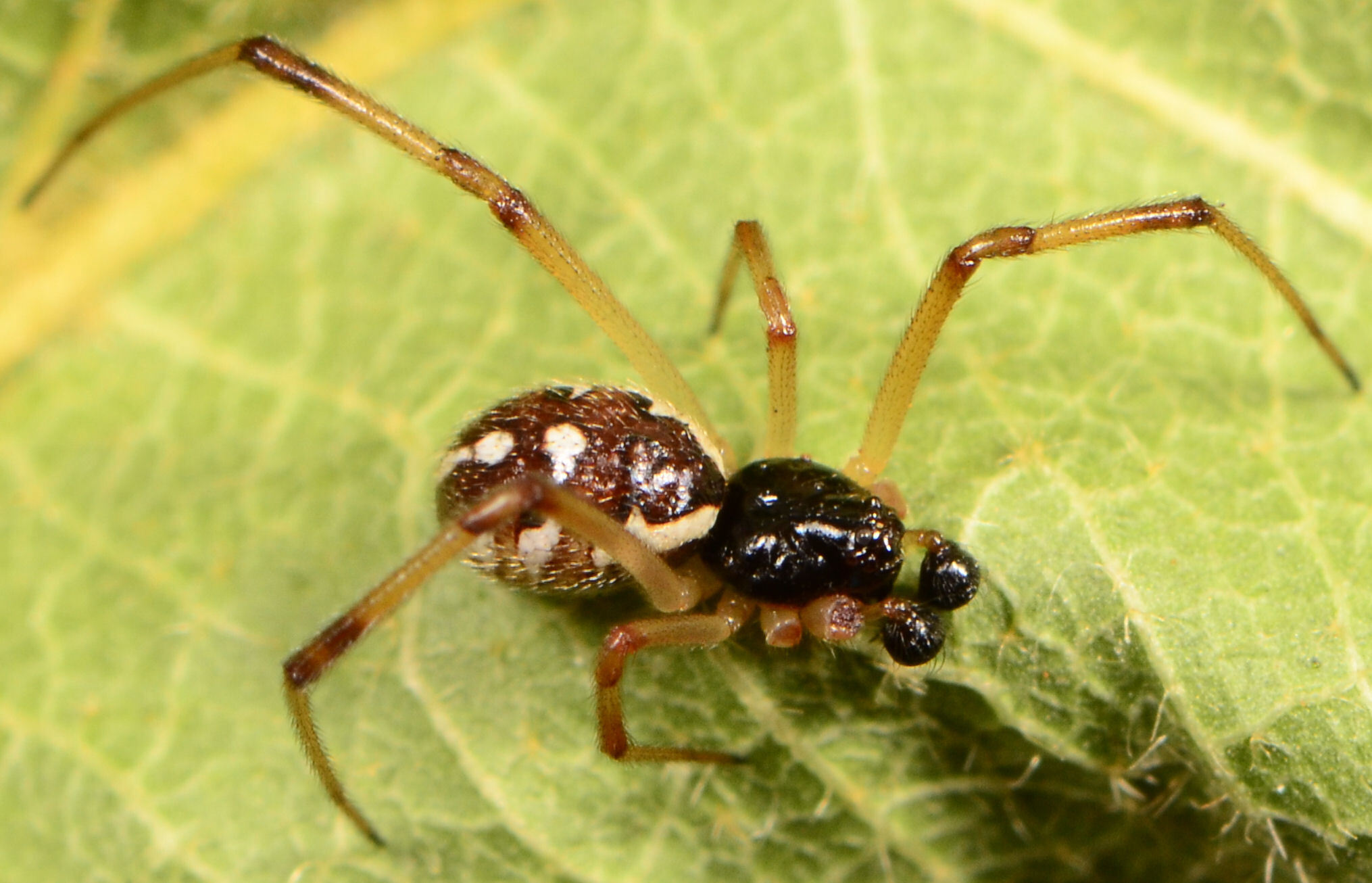
male

== Conservation ==
Latrodectus rhodesiensis is listed as Least Concern by the South African National Biodiversity Institute due to its wide geographical range. The species is protected in Roodeplaatdam Nature Reserve.

== Taxonomy ==
The species was revised by Lotz in 1994.
