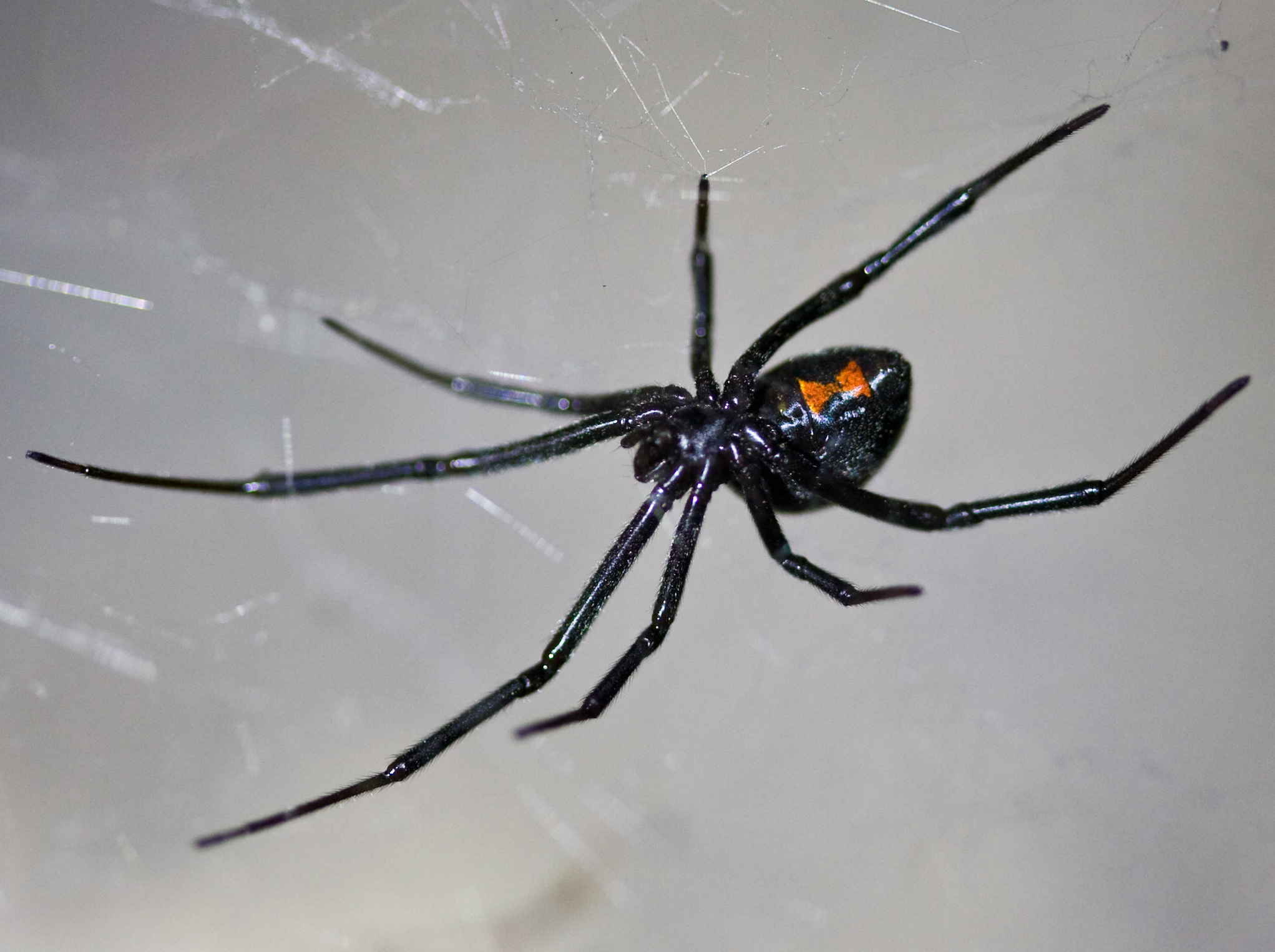
- Female Latrodectus hesperus, or western black widow

Scientific classification
- Kingdom: Animalia
- Phylum: Arthropoda
- Subphylum: Chelicerata
- Class: Arachnida
- Order: Araneae
- Infraorder: Araneomorphae
- Family: Theridiidae
- Genus: Latrodectus; Walckenaer, 1805

Type species
- L. tredecimguttatus (Rossi, 1790)

Species
- 35, see text

Synonyms
- Chacoca Badcock, 1932

= Latrodectus =

Genus of spiders

Latrodectus is a broadly distributed genus of spiders informally called the widow spiders, with several species that are commonly known as the true widows. This group is composed of those often called black widow spiders, brown widow spiders, and similar spiders.

== Diversity ==
A member of the family Theridiidae, this genus contains 34 species, which include several North American "black widows" (southern black widow Latrodectus mactans, western black widow Latrodectus hesperus, and northern black widow Latrodectus variolus). Besides these, North America also has the red widow Latrodectus bishopi and the brown widow Latrodectus geometricus, which, in addition to North America, has a much wider geographic distribution.

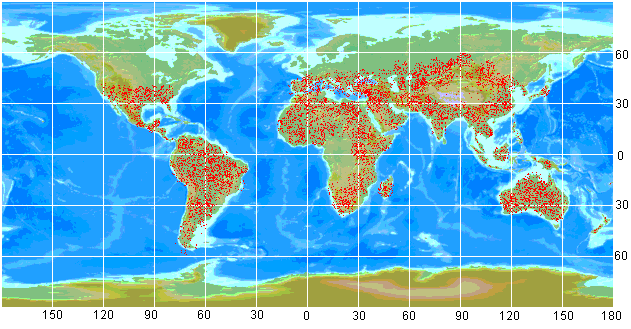
Latrodectus map

Elsewhere, others include the European black widow (Latrodectus tredecimguttatus), the Australian redback spider (Latrodectus hasseltii) and the closely related New Zealand katipō (Latrodectus katipo), several different species in Southern Africa that can be called button spiders, and the South American black widow spiders (Latrodectus corallinus and Latrodectus curacaviensis). Species vary widely in size. In most cases, the females are dark-coloured and can be readily identified by reddish markings on the central underside (ventral) abdomen, which are often hourglass-shaped.

== Venom ==
These small spiders have an unusually potent venom containing the neurotoxin latrotoxin, which causes the condition latrodectism, both named after the genus. Female widow spiders have unusually large venom glands, and their bite can be particularly harmful to large vertebrates, including humans. However, despite their notoriety, Latrodectus bites rarely cause death or produce serious complications. Only the bites of the females are dangerous to humans.

Due to the presence of latrotoxin in their venom, black widow bites are potentially dangerous and may result in systemic effects (latrodectism) including severe muscle pain, abdominal cramps, diaphoresis, tachycardia, and muscle spasms. Symptoms usually last for 3–7 days, but may persist for several weeks. In 1933, a member of the University of Alabama medical faculty, Allan Blair, conducted an experiment on himself to document the symptoms of a black widow bite, and to test whether someone can build immunity after being bitten. The effects of the bite were so painful and harsh that Blair failed to complete the experiment and did not follow through with being bitten a second time.

In the United States each year, about 2,500 people report being bitten by a black widow, but most do not need medical treatment. Some bites have no venom injected—a "dry" bite. In the United States, a 2012 review by the American Association of Poison Control Centers found no deaths from black widows since 1983. Black widows are not especially aggressive spiders, and they rarely bite humans unless startled or otherwise threatened.

Contrary to popular assumptions, most people who are bitten suffer no serious damage, let alone death. Fatal bites were reported in the early 20th century mostly with Latrodectus tredecimguttatus, the Mediterranean black widow.

Since the venom is not usually life-threatening, antivenom has been used as pain relief and not to save lives. However, a study demonstrated that standardized pain medication, when combined with either antivenom or a placebo, had similar improvements in pain and resolution of symptoms.

== Description ==
The eye arrangement of spiders in the genus Latrodectus

Female widow spiders are typically dark brown or a shiny black in colour when they are full grown, usually exhibiting a red or orange hourglass on the ventral surface (underside) of the abdomen; some may have a pair of red spots or have no marking at all. The male widow spiders often exhibit various red or red and white markings on the dorsal surface (upper side) of the abdomen, ranging from a single stripe to bars or spots, and juveniles are often similar to the male pattern. Females of a few species are paler brown and some have no bright markings. The bodies of black widow spiders range from 3–10 mm (0.12–0.39 in) in size; some females can measure 13 mm (0.51 in) in their body length (not including legs). Including legs, female adult black widows generally measure 25–38 mm (1–1.5 in).

== Behaviour ==
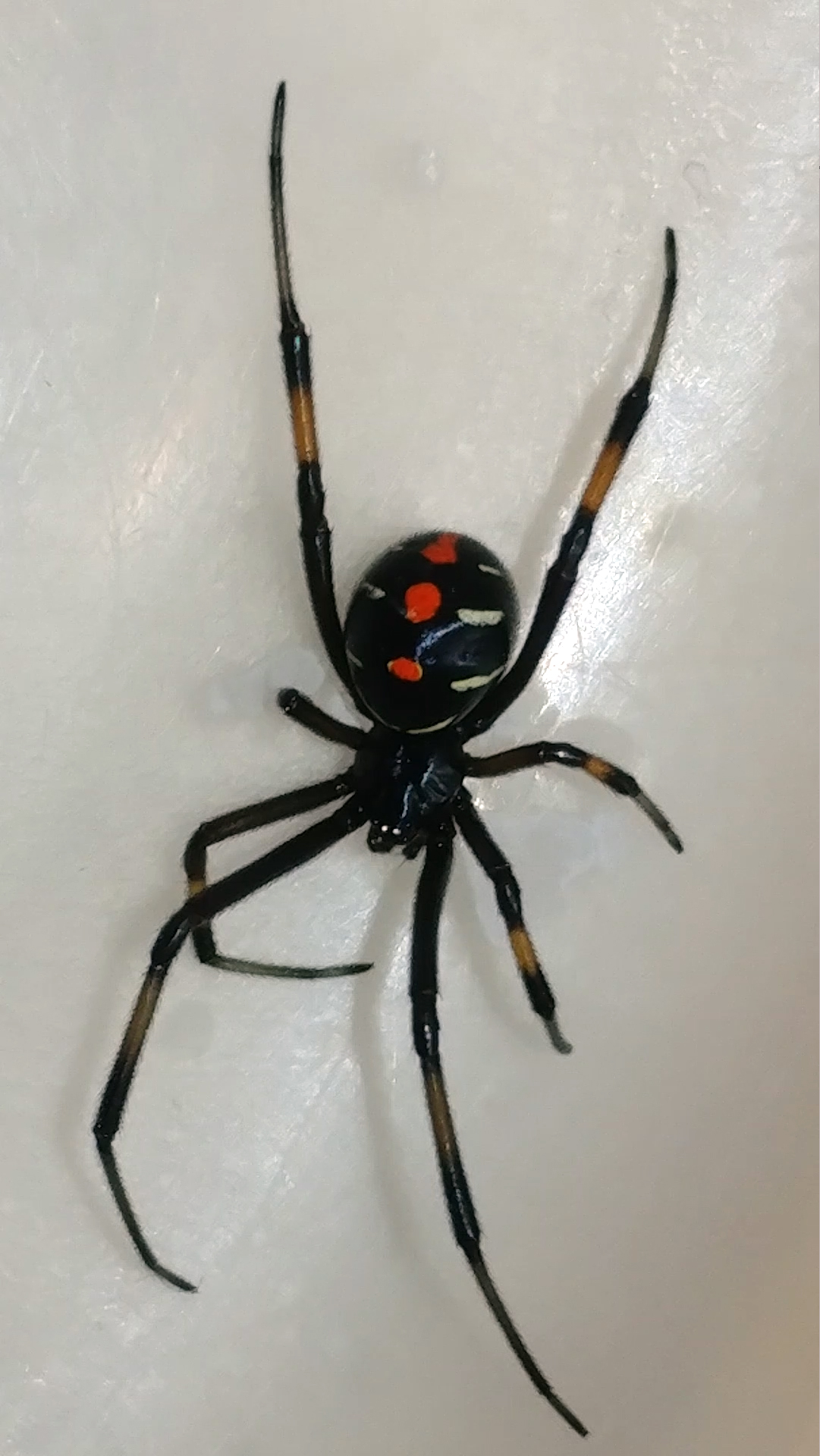
This is a spider crawling on the corner at the Metrolink station at the city of Upland.

The prevalence of sexual cannibalism, a behaviour in which the female eats the male after mating, has inspired the common name "widow spiders". This behaviour may promote the survival odds of the offspring; however, females of some species only rarely show this behaviour, and much of the documented evidence for sexual cannibalism has been observed in laboratory cages where the males could not escape. Male black widow spiders tend to select their mates by determining if the female has eaten already to avoid being eaten themselves. They are able to tell if the female has fed by sensing chemicals in the web. Latrodectus hesperus is referred to as an "opportunistic cannibal" because in dire situations it will resort to cannibalism. In addition to sexual cannibalism, Latrodectus hesperus are also known to engage in sibling cannibalism.

Like other members of the Theridiidae, widow spiders construct a web of irregular, tangled, sticky silken fibres. Black widow spiders prefer to nest near the ground in dark and undisturbed areas, usually in small holes produced by animals, or around construction openings or woodpiles. Indoor nests are in dark, undisturbed places such as under desks or furniture or in a basement. The spider frequently hangs upside down near the centre of its web and waits for insects to blunder in and get stuck. Then, before the insect can extricate itself, the spider rushes over to envenomate and wrap it in silk. To feed, the spider's mouth pulses digestive juices over the prey, which liquifies, which the spider internalizes by capillary action, sucking the slurry into its mouth. Their prey consists of small insects such as flies, mosquitoes, grasshoppers, beetles, and caterpillars. If the spider perceives a threat, it quickly lets itself down to the ground on a safety line of silk.

As with other web-weavers, these spiders have very poor eyesight and depend on vibrations reaching them through their webs to find trapped prey or warn them of larger threats. When a widow spider is trapped, it is unlikely to bite, preferring to play dead or flick silk at the potential threat; bites occur when they cannot escape. Many injuries to humans are due to defensive bites delivered when a spider gets unintentionally squeezed or pinched. The blue mud dauber species, Chalybion californicum, is a wasp that, in western North America, is the primary predator of black widow spiders.

The ultimate tensile strength and other physical properties of Latrodectus hesperus (western black widow) silk are similar to the properties of silk from orb-weaving spiders that had been tested in other studies. The tensile strength for the three kinds of silk measured in the Blackledge study was about 1,000 MPa. The ultimate strength reported in a previous study for Trichonephila edulis was 1,290 ± 160 MPa. The tensile strength of spider silk is comparable to that of steel wire of the same thickness. However, as the density of steel is about six times that of silk, silk is correspondingly stronger than steel wire of the same weight.

Spiders of the genus Steatoda (also of the Theridiidae) are often mistaken for widow spiders, and are known as "false widow spiders"; while their bite can be painful, they are significantly less harmful to humans.

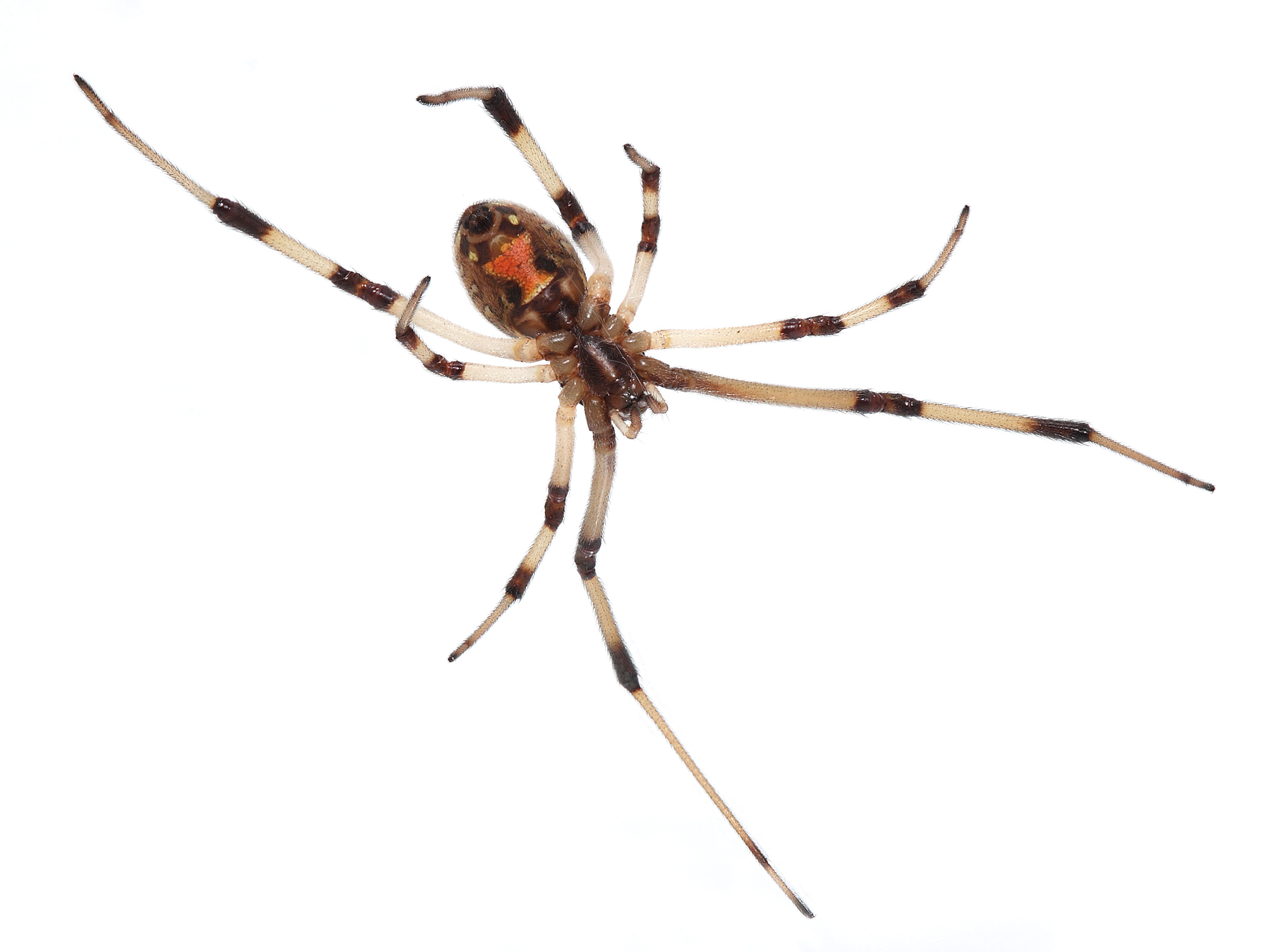
Ventral side of a L. geometricus displaying the hourglass marking

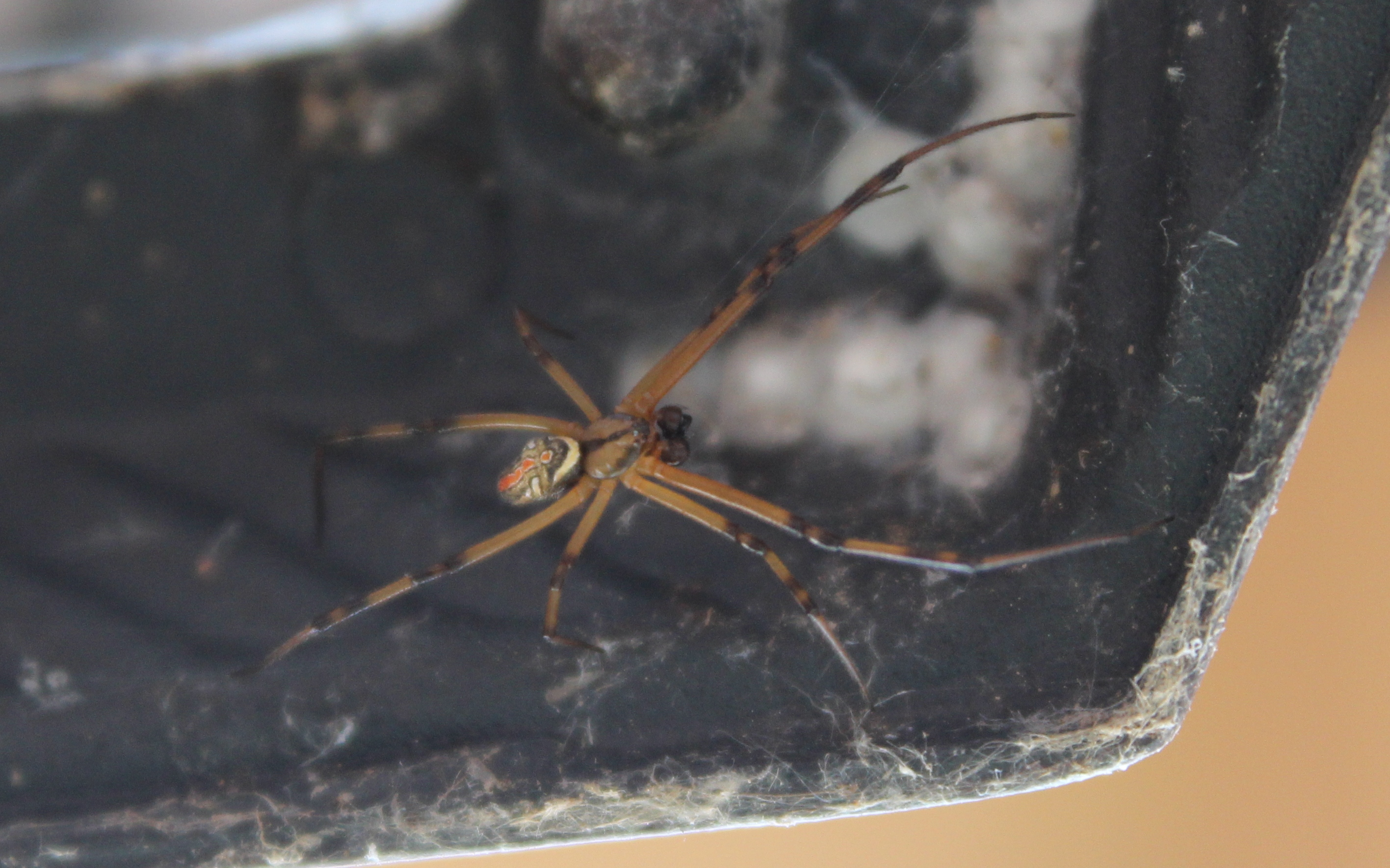
Dorsal side of a mature male L. hesperus in Colorado, United States

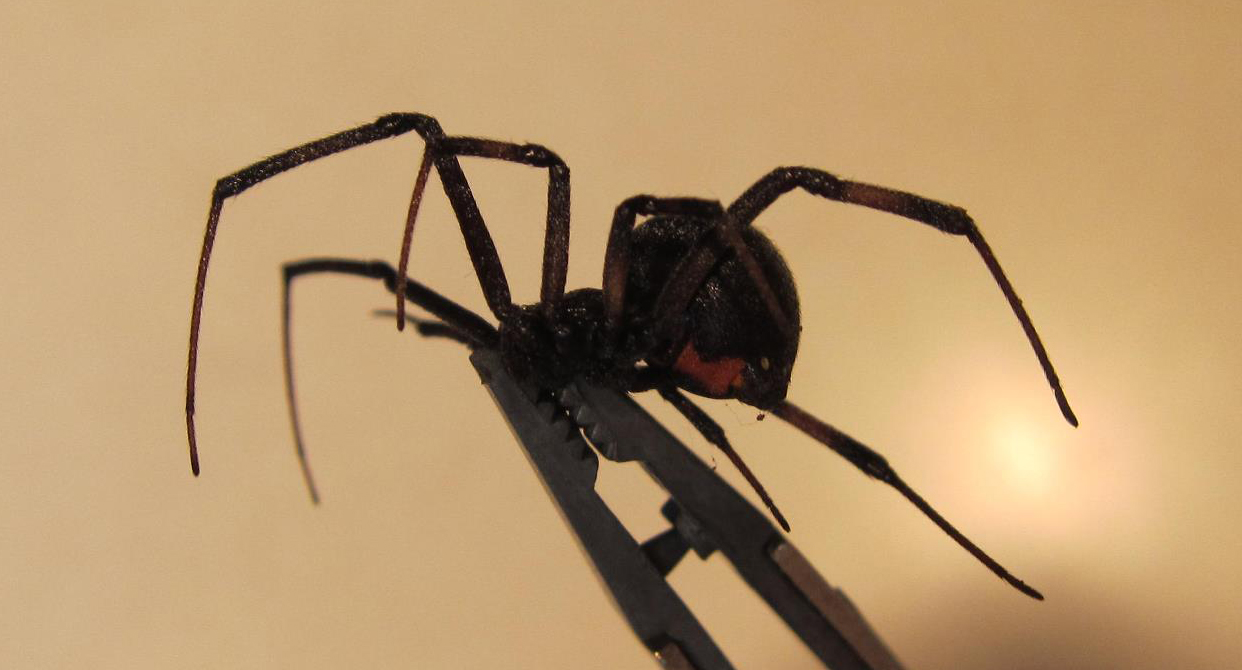
L. hesperus profile

== Taxonomy ==
The genus Latrodectus was erected by Charles Athanase Walckenaer in 1805, for the species Latrodectus tredecimguttatus and Latrodectus mactans. Arachnologist Herbert Walter Levi revised the genus in 1959, studying the female sexual organs and noting their similarity across described species. He concluded the colour variations were variable across the world and were not sufficient to warrant species status, and reclassified the redback and several other species as subspecies of the black widow spider.

Levi also noted that study of the genus had been contentious; in 1902, both F. O. Pickard-Cambridge and Friedrich Dahl had revised the genus, with each criticising the other. Cambridge questioned Dahl's separating species on what he considered minor anatomical details, and the latter dismissed the former as an "ignoramus".

== Species ==
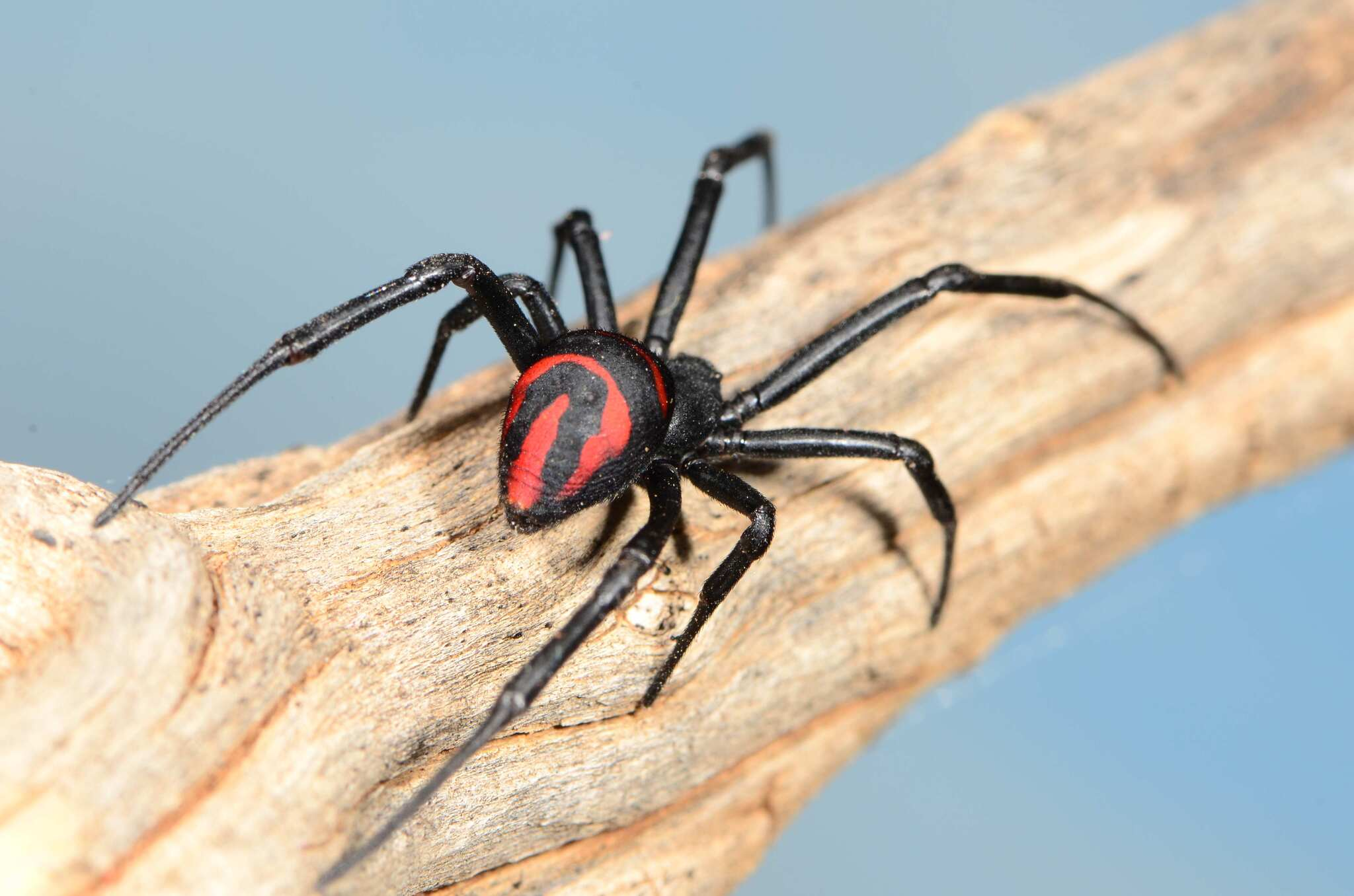
Female L. cinctus from South Africa

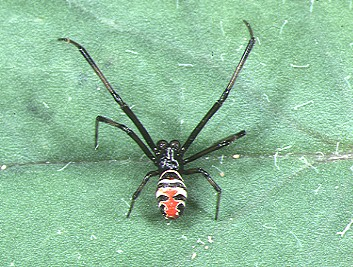
Male L. elegans from Japan

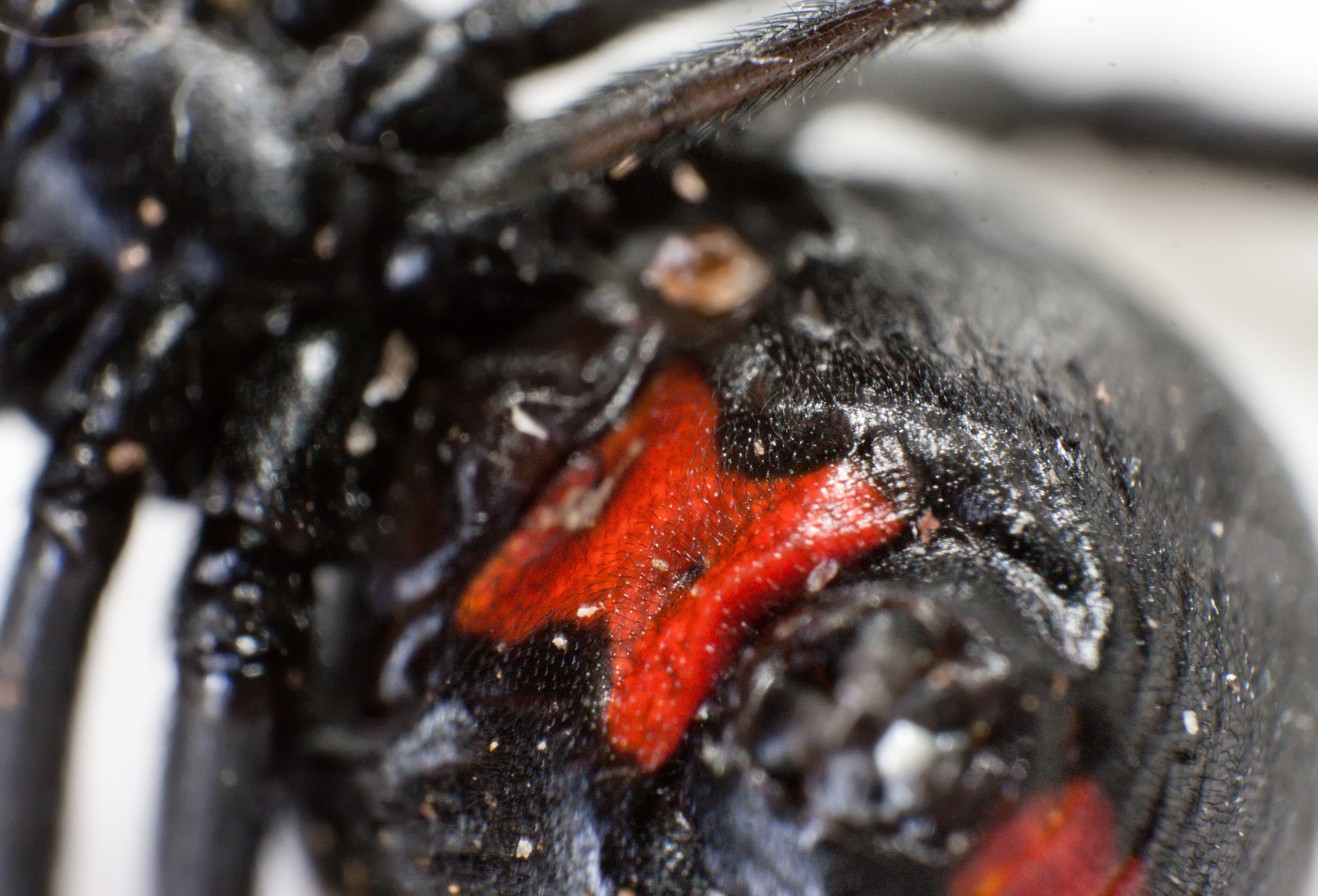
L. hesperus hair and markings

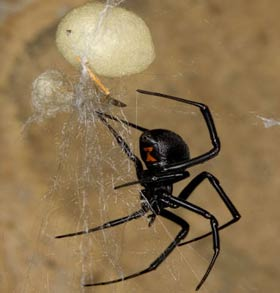
L. hesperus with egg sac

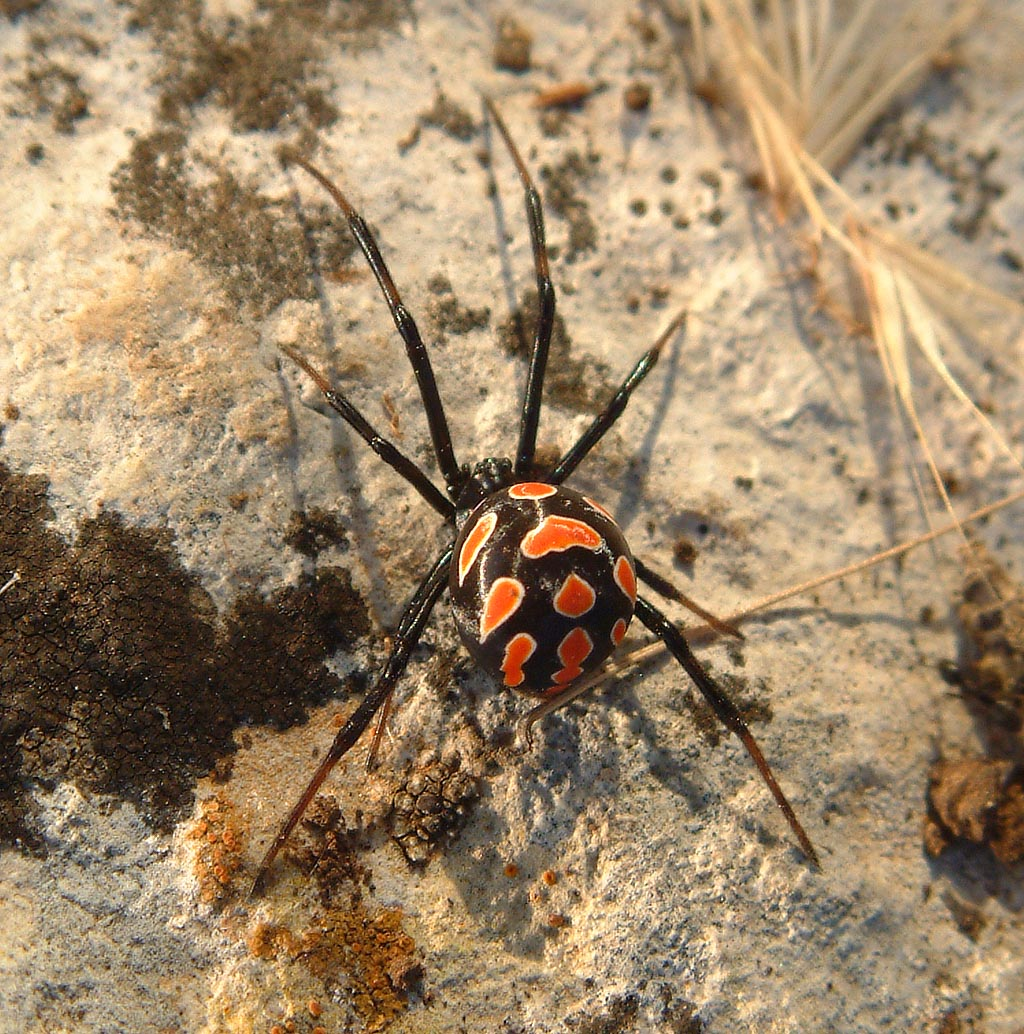
L. tredecimguttatus (female swollen with eggs)

As of October 2025, this genus includes 35 species:

- Latrodectus antheratus (Badcock, 1932) – Paraguay, Argentina
- Latrodectus apicalis Butler, 1877 – Galapagos
- Latrodectus bishopi Kaston, 1938 – United States
- Latrodectus cinctus Blackwall, 1865 – Cape Verde, Africa, Oman, Kuwait, Iraq, Iran
- Latrodectus corallinus Abalos, 1980 – Brazil, Argentina
- Latrodectus curacaviensis (Müller, 1776) – Caribbean, South America
- Latrodectus dahli Levi, 1959 – North Africa, Cyprus, Turkey, Azerbaijan, Kazakhstan, Middle East, Iran, Central Asia
- Latrodectus diaguita Carcavallo, 1960 – Argentina
- Latrodectus elegans Thorell, 1898 – India, Nepal, Myanmar, China, Japan
- Latrodectus erythromelas Schmidt & Klaas, 1991 – India, Sri Lanka
- Latrodectus garbae Rueda & Realpe, 2021 – Colombia
- Latrodectus geometricus C. L. Koch, 1841 – Africa. Introduced to both Americas, St. Helena, Middle East, Pakistan, India, China, Japan, Thailand, Malaysia, Papua New Guinea, Australia, Hawaii
- Latrodectus hasselti Thorell, 1870 – Southeast Asia to Australia. Introduced to Pakistan, India, Japan, New Zealand
- Latrodectus hesperus Chamberlin & Ivie, 1935 – Canada, United States, Mexico. Introduced to Israel, Korea
- Latrodectus hurtadoi Rueda & Realpe, 2021 – Colombia
- Latrodectus hystrix Simon, 1890 – Yemen (mainland, Socotra)
- Latrodectus indistinctus O. Pickard-Cambridge, 1904 – Namibia, South Africa
- Latrodectus karrooensis Smithers, 1944 – South Africa
- Latrodectus katipo Powell, 1871 – New Zealand
- Latrodectus lilianae Melic, 2000 – Spain
- Latrodectus mactans (Fabricius, 1775) – Probably native to North America only. Introduced to South America, Asia
- Latrodectus menavodi Vinson, 1863 – Madagascar, Comoros, Seychelles (Aldabra)
- Latrodectus mirabilis (Holmberg, 1876) – Brazil, Argentina
- Latrodectus obscurior Dahl, 1902 – Cape Verde, Madagascar
- Latrodectus occidentalis Valdez-Mondragón, 2023 – Mexico
- Latrodectus pallidus O. Pickard-Cambridge, 1872 – Cape Verde to Libya, South Africa, Turkey, Georgia, Kazakhstan, Iran, Central Asia
- Latrodectus quartus Abalos, 1980 – Argentina
- Latrodectus renivulvatus Dahl, 1902 – St. Helena, Africa, Yemen, Saudi Arabia, Iraq
- Latrodectus revivensis Shulov, 1948 – Israel, Iran, Canary Islands?
- Latrodectus rhodesiensis Mackay, 1973 – Namibia, Botswana, Zimbabwe, South Africa
- Latrodectus thoracicus Nicolet, 1849 – Chile
- Latrodectus tredecimguttatus (Rossi, 1790) – Mediterranean, Ukraine, Caucasus, Russia (Europe to South Siberia), Kazakhstan, Middle East, Iran, Central Asia, China (type species)
- Latrodectus umbukwane B. M. O. G. Wright, C. D. Wright, Lyle & Engelbrecht, 2019 – South Africa
- Latrodectus variegatus Nicolet, 1849 – Chile, Argentina
- Latrodectus variolus Walckenaer, 1837 – Canada, United States

Nomina dubia

- L. dotatus C. L. Koch, 1841
- L. limacidus Cantor, 1842
- L. pallidus Caporiacco, 1933

== Distribution ==
Widow spiders are found on every continent of the world except Antarctica. In North America, the black widows commonly known as southern (Latrodectus mactans), western (Latrodectus hesperus), and northern (Latrodectus variolus) are found in the United States, equally in western Mexico (Latrodectus occidentalis), as well as parts of southern Canada – particularly in the Okanagan Valley of British Columbia, as are the "grey" or "brown widow spiders" (Latrodectus geometricus) and the "red widow spiders" (Latrodectus bishopi).

The most prevalent species occurring in eastern Asia and Australia is commonly called the redback (Latrodectus hasselti).

They are often confused with spiders in the genus Steatoda, known as false widow spiders, due to their similar appearance.

== See also ==
- List of medically significant spider bites
- Steatoda, the false widow spiders
