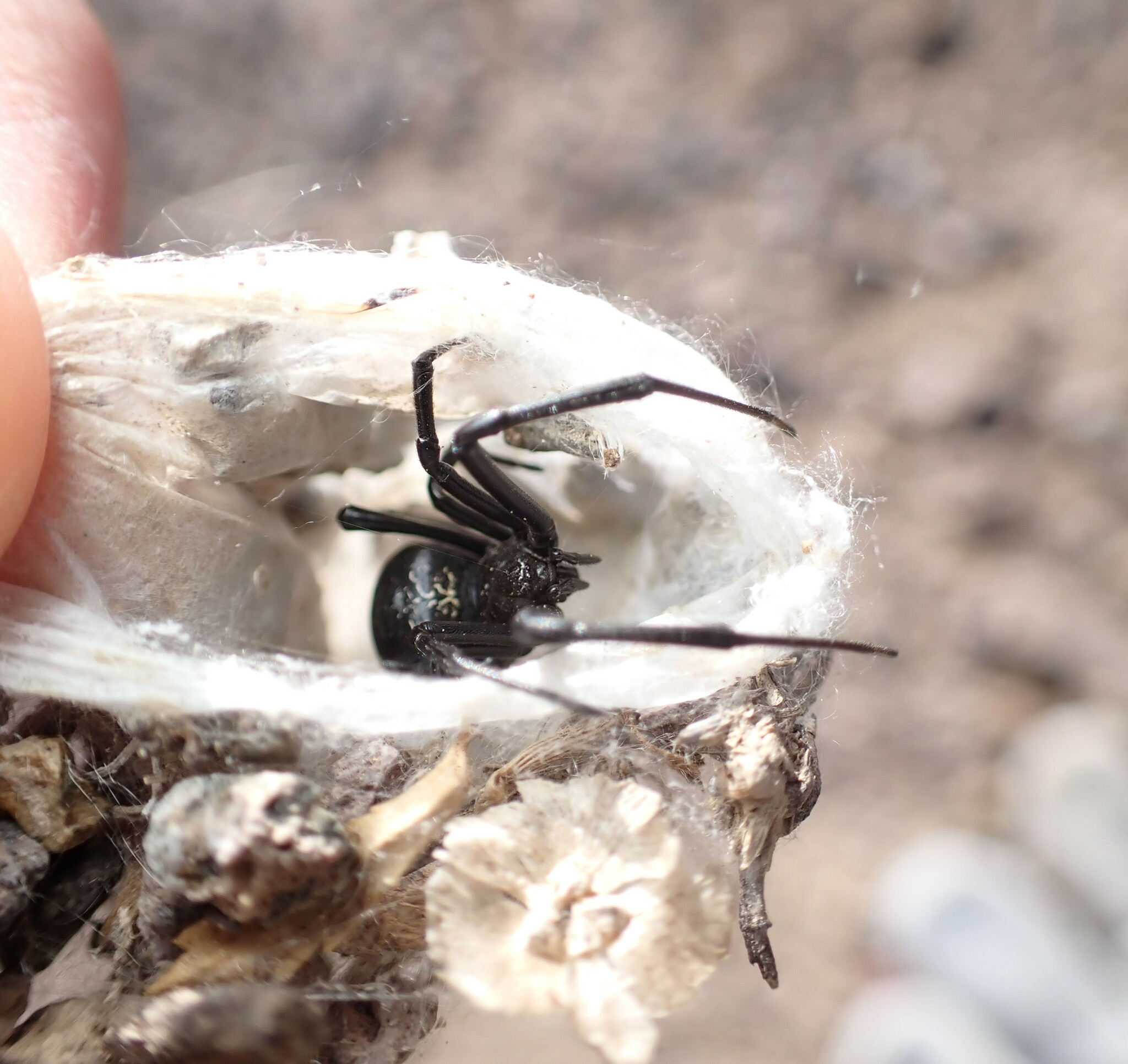
- Female in Iran

Scientific classification
- Kingdom: Animalia
- Phylum: Arthropoda
- Subphylum: Chelicerata
- Class: Arachnida
- Order: Araneae
- Infraorder: Araneomorphae
- Family: Theridiidae
- Genus: Latrodectus
- Species: L. revivensis

Binomial name
- Latrodectus revivensis Shulov, 1948

= Latrodectus revivensis =

Species of spider

Latrodectus revivensis, also known as the desert widow, is a species of venomous spider belonging to the Latrodectus genus and located in the Negev desert and the Arava valley (Arabah).

As with most members of its genus, it contains venom that can cause latrodectism through bites in various organisms. It has been reported that its potency is around the same relative strength to that found in Latrodectus tredecimguttatus. Several adaptations are found L. revivensis which enables it to take advantage of some of features of the natural ecology of the areas where it dwells. Mainly of interest is its complex web structure which features several mechanisms for prey capture and predator deterrence. These elaborate webs are formed mainly in sparse brush and typically contain sections that reach the ground as well as the upper canopies.

== Description ==
As with several species in Latrodectus, phenotype and morphology vary between male and females. The females themselves can range from 9-19 millimeters long and around 7 millimeters in height. Males can range from 3-7 millimeters in length. Coloration can vary depending on gender and statues of the individual. Typically, females are very dark brown but pregnant females display a light brown pigment with a pale golden hue. Males are typically brown with a patterned abdomen containing various shades of brown. Males can present with grey-white spots and stripes along their abdomens. Hairs and setae are present and short on the cephalothorax and legs while being longer in the chelicerae in females. In terms of relative size, males have a longer length to body size ratio than females. As for coloration of limbs, legs tend to see the same dark coloration as the main body, however the pigment starts becoming lighter near the ends of legs at the tarsi. Coloration is not consistent across the life cycle, typically pigmentation continues to darken after each instar.

=== Web ===
Webs of this species are relatively complex featuring many different areas with various functions. There are functional spaces for general nesting and separate spaces for prey capture. It features a funnel or cone made of tightly woven silk near the top of the nest which rests in upper canopy of the various bushes and brush the spiders are found in. This funnel is more narrow near the top of the bush and contains densely woven silk. In this silk can be found various debris such as fallen parts of the bush, dead organisms and their carcasses, shells, sand, rocks, and shells of snails. This is thought to be in part to obscure vision from predators which are above the bush such as birds. Adjacent to the nest area is a capture area or platform. This part of the web is much less densely woven with silk. The platform is connected by silks of strand to the ground and to the nest. The silk strands that reach the ground function in capturing terrestrial prey. The other strands that reach the nest are for relocation and structural support. The webs complex nature serves more than one function. In addition to utility and predator avoidance it also functions as a temperature regulator by providing shade during the summer months. The structure of the nest also functions to increase airflow without sacrificing its obscurity from predators. Lastly, they also function in reproduction as the silk that spans the web typically contains pheromones that allow males to find and locate female nests.

=== Prey and predators ===
The primary food source of L. revivensis is terrestrial insects captured in the silk strands hanging from the capture area of the web. These insects include various beetles, ants, and it also feasts on other arachnids such as scorpions. Due to the nature of the local ecology in which they reside, L. revivensis is also itself prey. The main predators are various birds which can spot the spiders in brush while flying overhead, thus the need for a webbed and covered canopy. Other predators include lizards and mantises.

== Behaviors ==
Latrodectus revivensis are nocturnal and mainly active during the night. During they day they shield themselves from sight in their webs under the densely silk lined nest area of their webs. Much like many species under the genus Latrodectus, they exhibit sexual dimorphism not only in morphology but also their behaviors.

=== Courtship behaviors ===
Males undergo courtship rituals with the females. These rituals can be drawn out and complex and typically start at maturation in males. Webs of female L. revivensis typically contain pheromones which can attract males to the area. At maturation males leave their nests and attempt to locate female nest with the help of pheromones from the females’ silk. Once located males begin attempting courtship rituals by climbing into the web and manipulating the silk fibers. These manipulations can range from tugging, pulling and even cutting the fibers. This is believed to be an attempt to cause vibrations and gain recognition from the female. One key aspect of courtship is cutting the females web and wrapping the females’ silk in the males’ silk. Several hypotheses have been proposed for this including reducing the pheromones present to dissuade other male competitors and reducing the effective area of vibratory generation to ensure the female does not get alarmed by the presence of the male or other extraneous factors. The male while performing these behaviors slowly makes his way to the female to begin copulation, at several points the female may become agitated at which point the male will have to leave or repeat his courtship. Female over aggression and attacks on males prior to copulation is rare and suggests that females recognize and differentiate male courtship from prey capture or attack by predators.

=== Sexual cannibalization ===
Like many other species within Latrodectus sexual cannibalism has been witnessed in L. revivensis typically after copulation. In many cases the male can avoid being consumed by the female and lives in the nest with her for a period of time. In other cases, the female will cannibalize the male. Several hypotheses have been proposed at to what mediates the female’s decision or ability to cannibalize her mate. Factors such as the male’s ability to escape and the female’s overall aggression appear to play a role in the decision.

== Habitat and ecology ==
Latrodectus revivensis has been typically found in the arid deserts of Negev and the Arava valley. Unlike some other species of Latrodectus which can be more reclusive in nest building and preferring secluded spaces, members of this species make large webs in bushes and other brush in large open areas of land. Species of brush they are typically found in ranges from Zygophyllum, and Artemisia, among others and tend to prefer individual plants which are taller in height. They forage mainly by preying on terrestrial insects such as beetles, ants and other arachnids. Due to their sparse environment they are exposed to predators themselves such as birds and larger terrestrial insects and vertebrates. The climate with which they reside is hot and dry especially in the summer seasons and as such have adapted their lifestyle and web design around this. Nocturnal activity combined with a web that promotes good airflow has allowed the species to stay cool during extreme heat as well as avoid predation in their more open environment.

=== See also ===
- Latrodectism
