= Latrodectus apicalis =

Scientific classification
- Domain: Eukaryota
- Kingdom: Animalia
- Phylum: Arthropoda
- Subphylum: Chelicerata
- Class: Arachnida
- Order: Araneae
- Infraorder: Araneomorphae
- Family: Theridiidae
- Genus: Latrodectus
- Species: L. apicalis

Binomial name
- Latrodectus apicalis Butler, 1877

Species of spider

Latrodectus apicalis, known as the Galapagos black widow, is endemic to the Galápagos Islands. Like many black widow spiders, it has a red or orange hourglass-shaped spot on the underside of the abdomen. It is venomous and sometimes hard to find.
