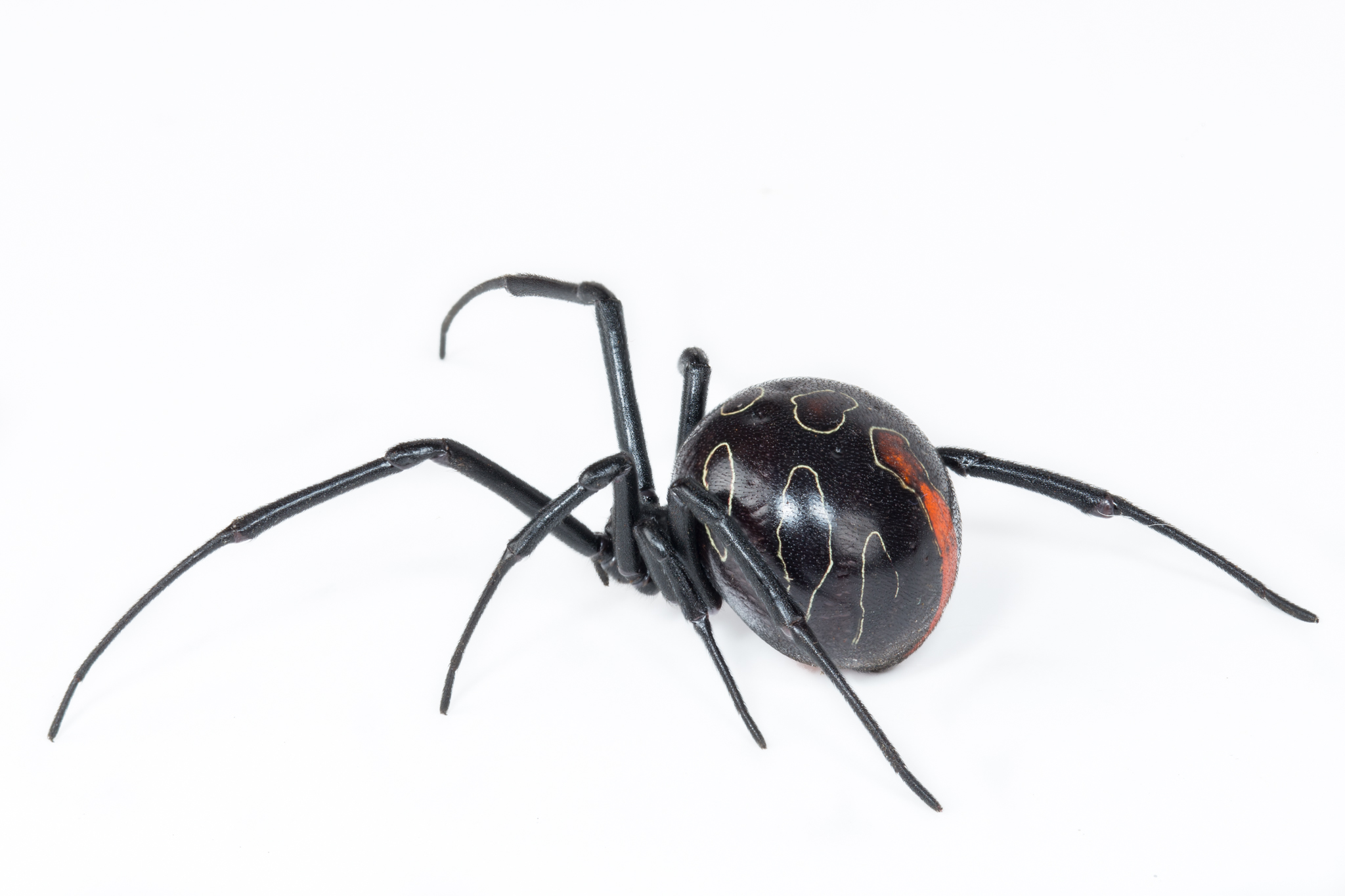
- Adult female, showing dorsal markings
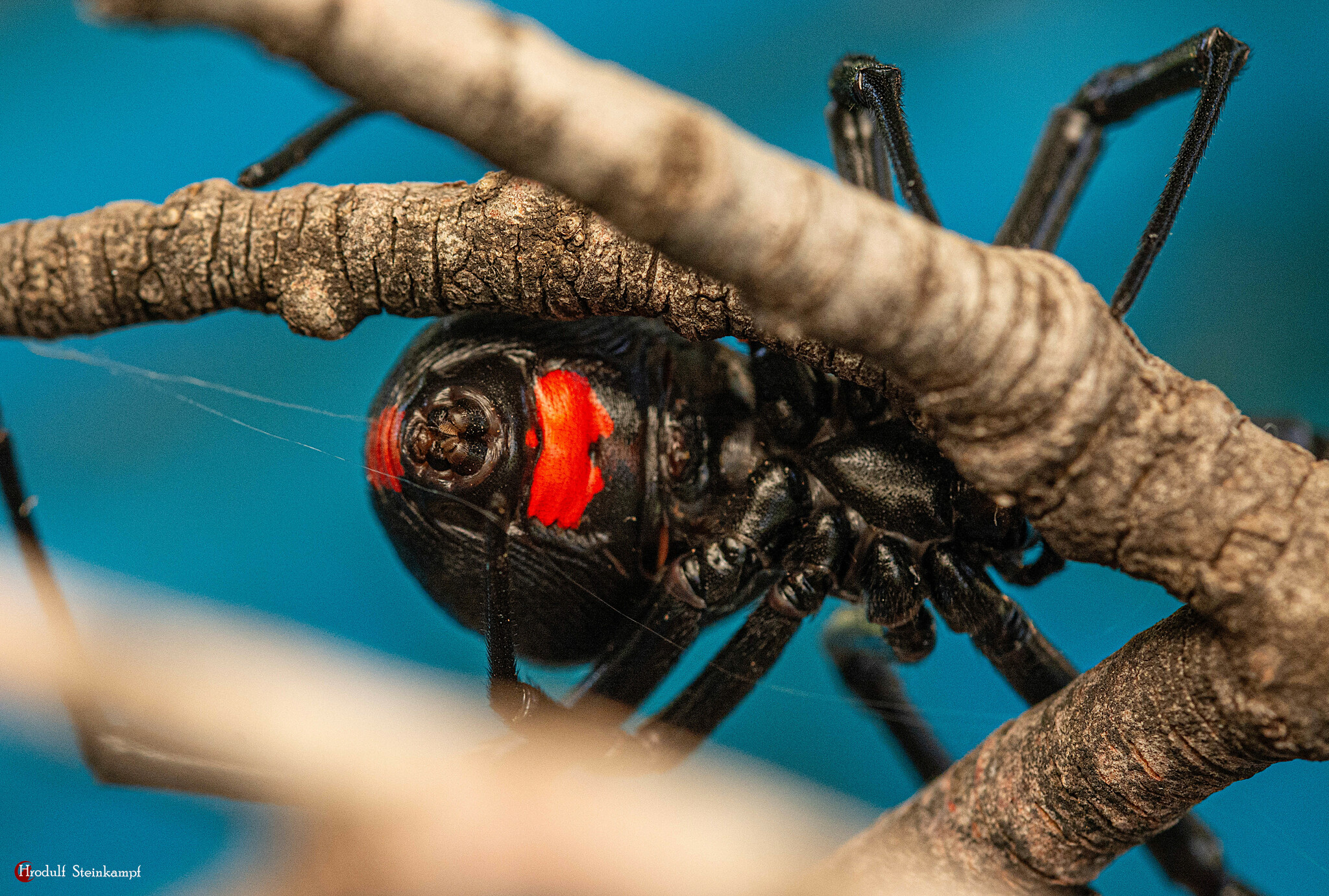
- Ventral markings

Scientific classification
- Kingdom: Animalia
- Phylum: Arthropoda
- Subphylum: Chelicerata
- Class: Arachnida
- Order: Araneae
- Infraorder: Araneomorphae
- Family: Theridiidae
- Genus: Latrodectus
- Species: L. umbukwane

Binomial name
- Latrodectus umbukwane B.M.O.G. Wright, C.D. Wright, Lyle & Engelbrecht, 2019

= Latrodectus umbukwane =

Species of spider

Latrodectus umbukwane, commonly known as the Phinda button spider, is a species of the spider in the genus Latrodectus described in 2019, named after the Phinda Private Game Reserve where research specimens were collected. As of 2019, it is known only from critically endangered sand forest environments in northern Zululand, KwaZulu-Natal, South Africa. It is believed to be the largest member of its genus.

== Discovery ==
A single female was found in 2014 in the Tembe Elephant Park. It was observed in a laboratory until its natural death two years. In 2017 a professional entomologist joined the study and a number of live specimens were collected from the Phinda reserve. They and their offspring were studied and in 2019 it was confirmed to be a new species. The first addition in 28 years to the 31 previously known button, or widow, spiders in the genus Latrodectus; eight were found in Africa.

== Life style ==
All known localities for the new species fall within sand forest habitats. Of the seven wild female specimens recorded, six were found in pristine, tall sand forest with predominantly bare ground below the canopy, on Phinda Private Game Reserve, which is part of the larger Munyawana Conservancy. A single specimen was found in the garden of the manager’s house on Tembe Elephant Park, at the edge of disturbed sand forest. The spiders were found more than 50 cm above the ground, with a silk retreat in a tree hollow. Webs were not generally present outside the hollow, but when they were recorded, they were typical hackle webs radiating outward from the hollow, and can be extensive (M.Wright et al. 2019).

== Description ==
Females have red markings on both the ventral and dorsal surfaces of the abdomen, unlike any other African Latrodectus species. They have parallel spermathecae and the copulatory ducts have three loops. The embolus of males has four loops and there are white markings on the ventral surface of the abdomen that darken with age. The large smooth egg sacs are bright purple when freshly laid, fading to shiny grey as they dry.

External anatomy

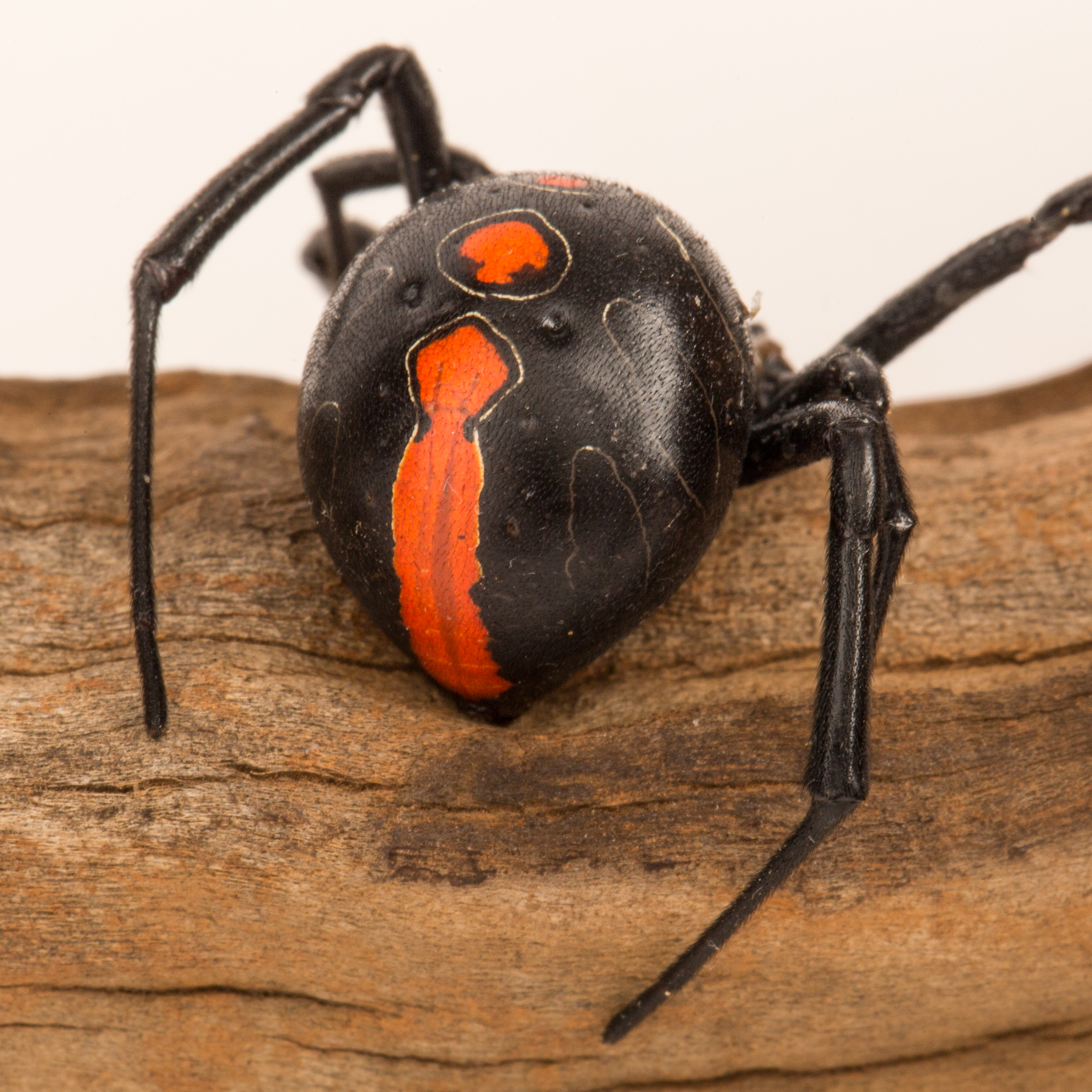
Female, showing dorsal markings

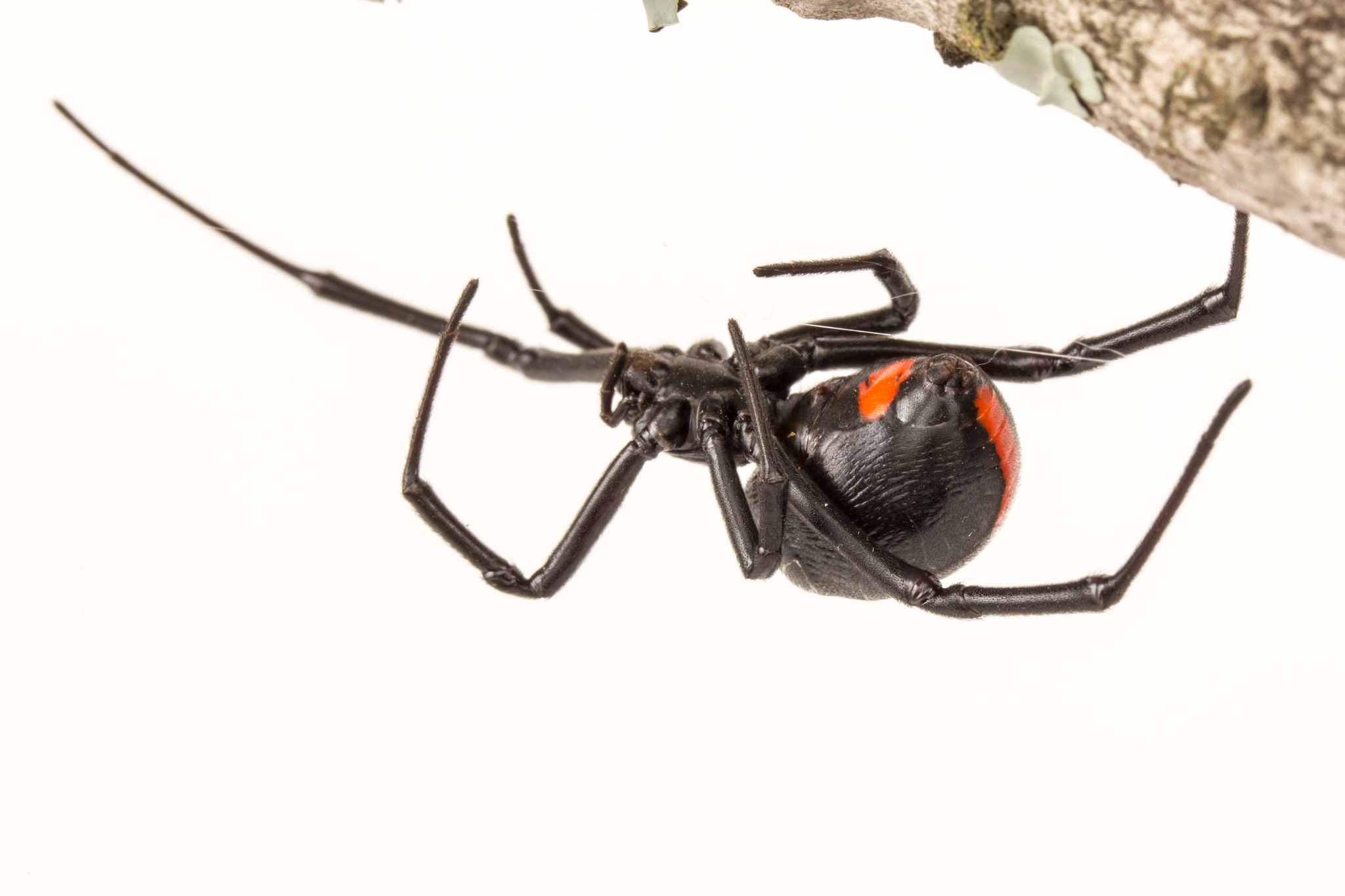
Adult female, ventral markings

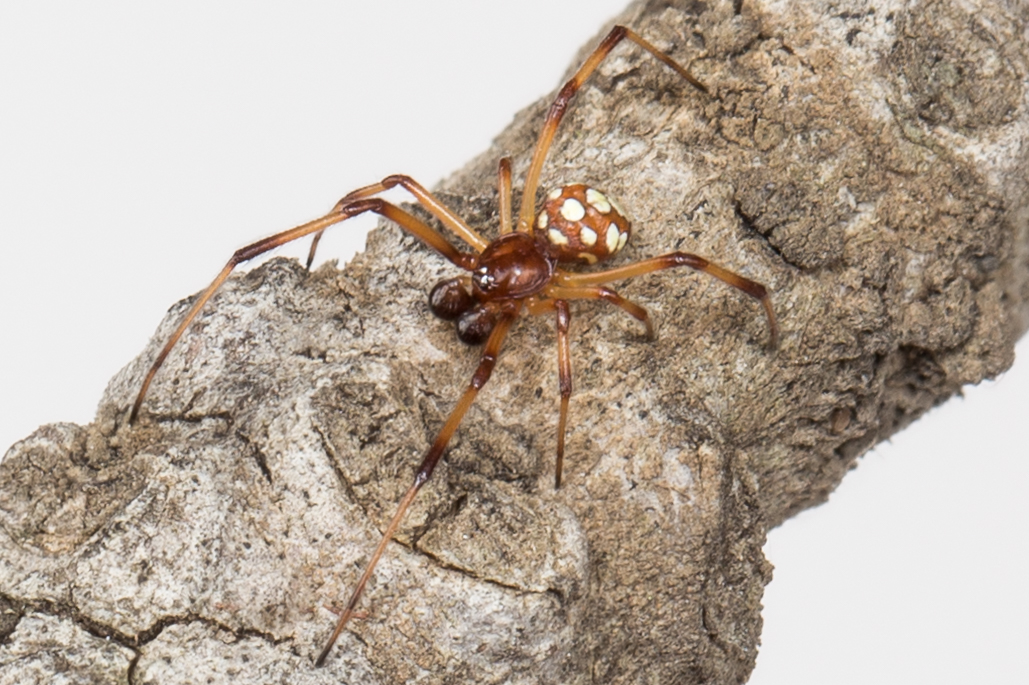
Adult male (not to scale)

== Habitat ==
The species is only known to occur in the critically endangered lowland sand forest biome of northern KwaZulu-Natal. These forests are threatened by illegal clearing for farming as well as wood collection. The females build nests in trees and stumps more than 50 centimetres above ground, which is higher than most other members of the genus.
