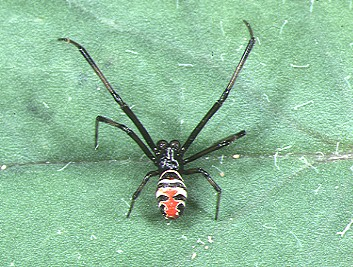
- Male
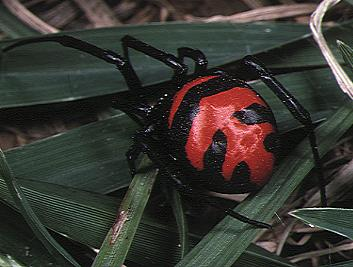
- Female

Scientific classification
- Kingdom: Animalia
- Phylum: Arthropoda
- Subphylum: Chelicerata
- Class: Arachnida
- Order: Araneae
- Infraorder: Araneomorphae
- Family: Theridiidae
- Genus: Latrodectus
- Species: L. elegans

Binomial name
- Latrodectus elegans Thorell, 1898

= Latrodectus elegans =

Species of spider

Latrodectus elegans is a species of black widow spider, found in South Asia, Southeast Asia and East Asia. It was first collected by the Swedish arachnologist Tamerlan Thorell in the Karen Hills in Myanmar, but is also found in Thailand, India, Nepal, Vietnam, China and Japan. As of July 2022, the World Spider Catalog lists only India, Nepal, Myanmar, China and Japan. This species has been recorded in India and Nepal only since 2012, and Indochina in 2015, which is thought to reflect historical under-surveying of arachnids in this region.

In 2022 a chromosome-scale reference genome was sequenced from specimens from Yunnan, producing a 1.57 Gb sized genome with 14 chromosomes. Annotating this there were found to be 20,167 protein-coding genes, including 55 toxin and 26 spidroin (spider silk) genes.
