= Latrodectus hystrix =

Scientific classification
- Kingdom: Animalia
- Phylum: Arthropoda
- Subphylum: Chelicerata
- Class: Arachnida
- Order: Araneae
- Infraorder: Araneomorphae
- Family: Theridiidae
- Genus: Latrodectus
- Species: L. hystrix

Binomial name
- Latrodectus hystrix Simon, 1890

Species of spider

Latrodectus hystrix is a species of spider in the family Theridiidae.

It is native to mainland Yemen and Socotra.
