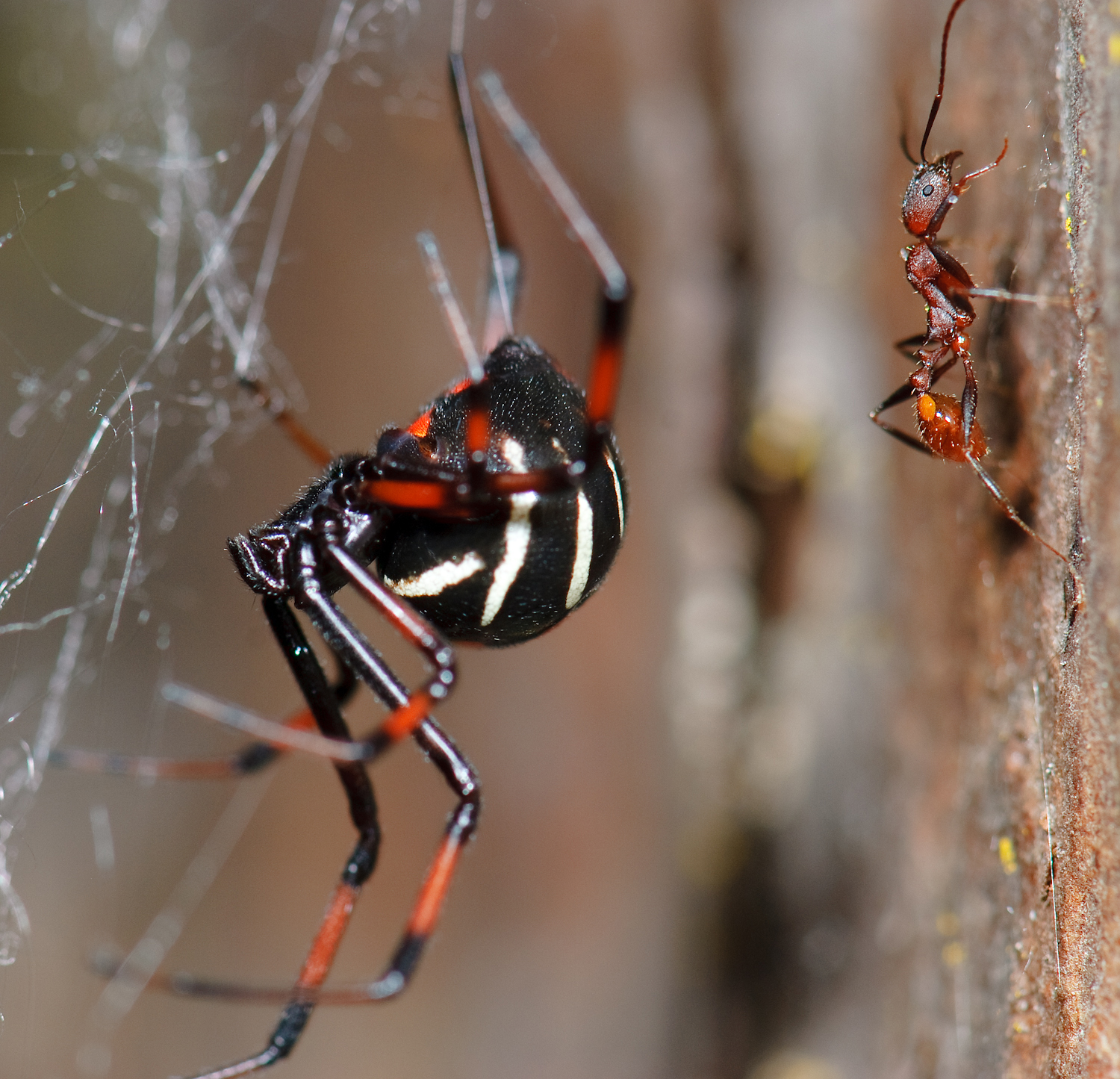
- Female
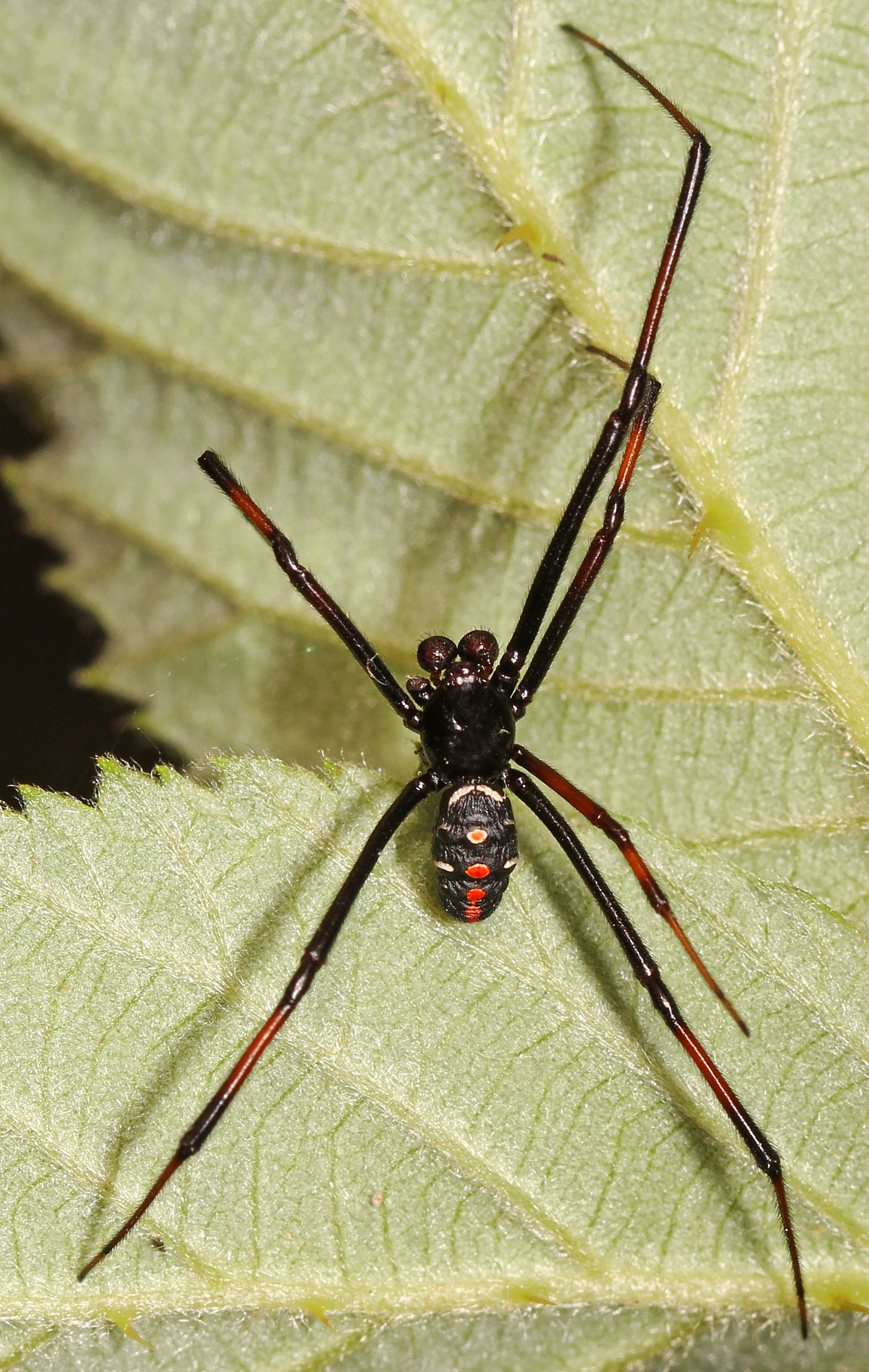
- Male (with damaged legs)

Scientific classification
- Kingdom: Animalia
- Phylum: Arthropoda
- Subphylum: Chelicerata
- Class: Arachnida
- Order: Araneae
- Infraorder: Araneomorphae
- Family: Theridiidae
- Genus: Latrodectus
- Species: L. variolus

Binomial name
- Latrodectus variolus Walckenaer, 1837

= Latrodectus variolus =

Species of spider

Latrodectus variolus, the northern black widow spider or northern widow, is a venomous species of spider in the genus Latrodectus of the family Theridiidae. The population is closely related to the red widow, Latrodectus bishopi.

In North America, the species is commonly found in Middle Atlantic states (New Jersey, Delaware, Connecticut, Maryland). During the April–May mating season, it can travel north along the coast as far as Massachusetts in summer, and rarely, in southern Ontario and southern Quebec, Michigan, and at least as far northwest as parts of Wisconsin.

A bite may cause latrodectism, and requires medical attention in the case of increasingly severe discomfort or spreading local redness accompanied by severe pain. Other symptoms, which can last up to a week, may include body aches, severe pain, fever, inflammation, nausea, and vomiting. Bites to humans are not typically deadly except in infants and the elderly. The LD-50 has been measured in mice as 1.20–2.70 mg (0.019–0.042 gr); each spider contains about 0.254 mg (0.0039 gr) of venom.

Unlike for the related Latrodectus mactans, as of 2015 no antivenom was available.
