= Latrodectus hurtadoi =

Scientific classification
- Kingdom: Animalia
- Phylum: Arthropoda
- Subphylum: Chelicerata
- Class: Arachnida
- Order: Araneae
- Infraorder: Araneomorphae
- Family: Theridiidae
- Genus: Latrodectus
- Species: L. hurtadoi

Binomial name
- Latrodectus hurtadoi Rueda & Realpe, 2021

Species of widow spider

Latrodectus hurtadoi is a species of black widow spider that is native to Colombia.

The appearance of this species changes as it ages. Spiderlings show a light brownish coloration (similar to Latrodectus geometricus) with thee lateral orange, red or white stripes surrounded by a dark border surrounding the hour glass shape. For adults, female members are black or dark brown and have a color pattern similar to Laterodectus heperus. Males are much smaller than females which are large spiders and have a lighter brown color.
