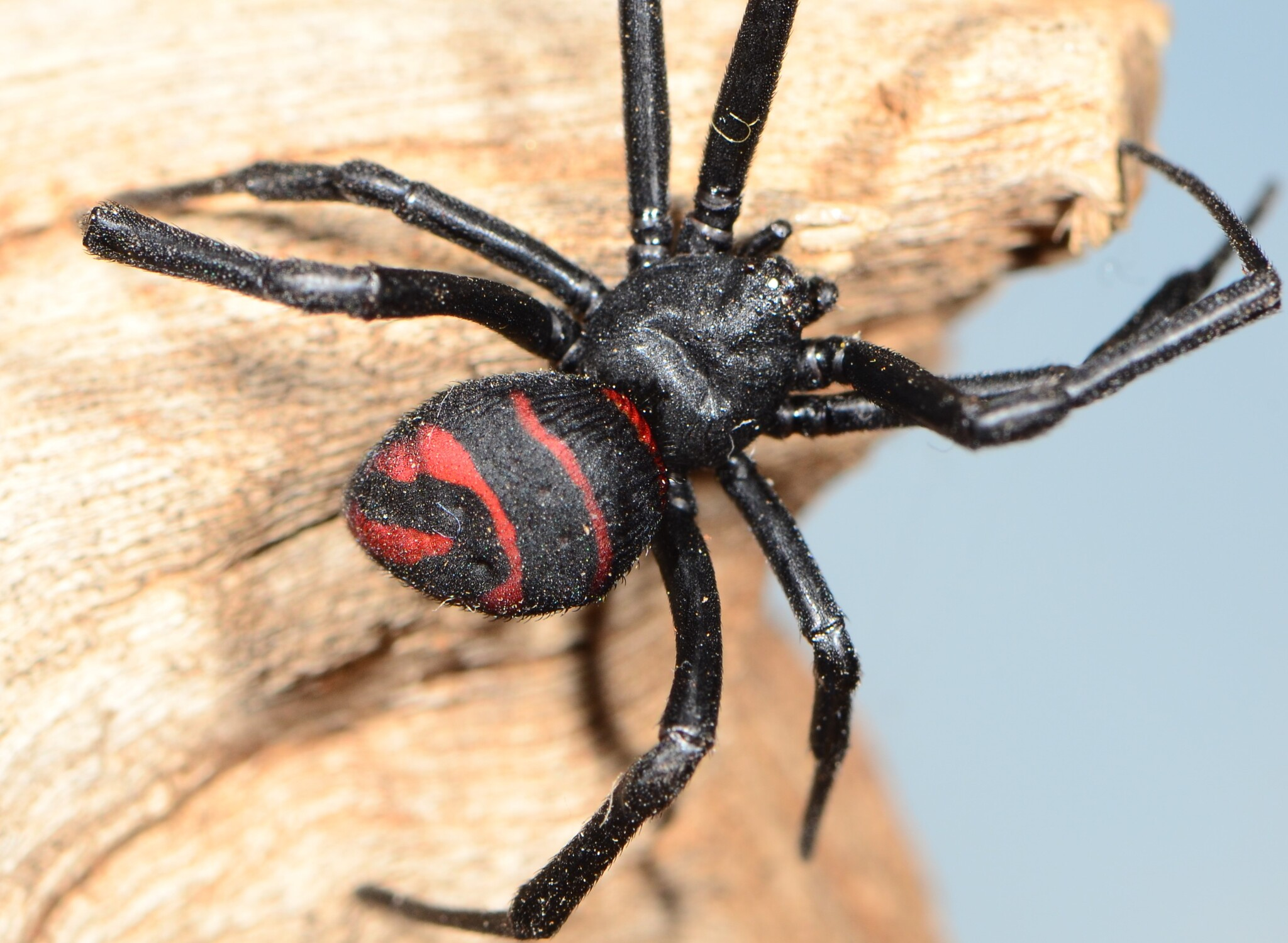
- Female
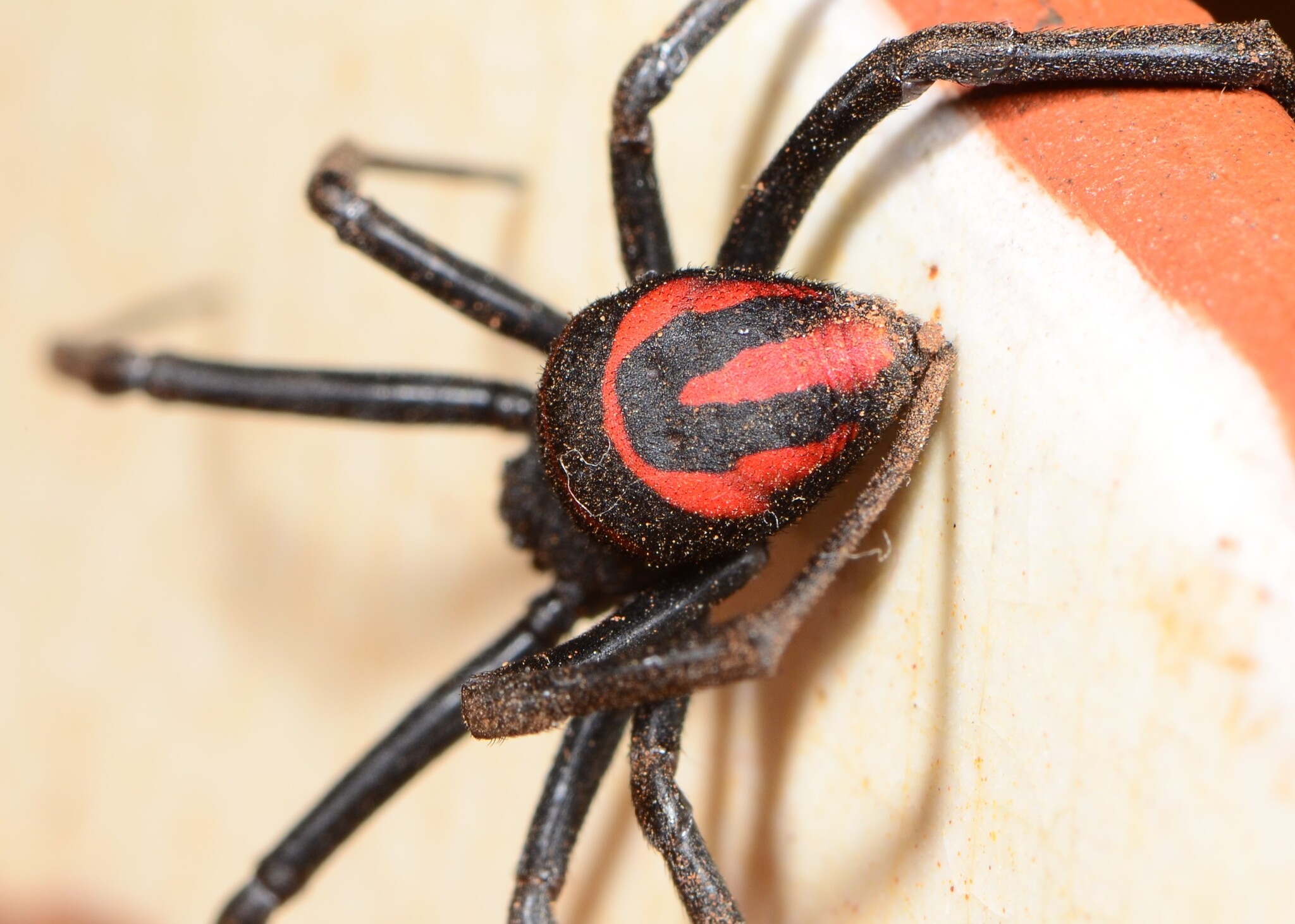
- Female

Scientific classification
- Kingdom: Animalia
- Phylum: Arthropoda
- Subphylum: Chelicerata
- Class: Arachnida
- Order: Araneae
- Infraorder: Araneomorphae
- Family: Theridiidae
- Genus: Latrodectus
- Species: L. cinctus

Binomial name
- Latrodectus cinctus Blackwall, 1865

Synonyms
- Latrodectus stuhlmanni Dahl, 1902

= Latrodectus cinctus =

East Coast Button Spider

Species of spider

Latrodectus cinctus is a species of spider in the family Theridiidae, found in Cape Verde Islands, Africa, Kuwait and Iran. It is one of six species of Latrodectus found in southern Africa, four of which, including L. cinctus, are known as black button or black widow spiders. Like all Latrodectus species, L. cinctus has a neurotoxic venom. It acts on nerve endings, causing the very unpleasant symptoms of latrodectism when humans are bitten.

== Distribution ==
Latrodectus cinctus is found in Cape Verde, Kuwait, Iraq, Iran, and throughout Africa including Ghana, Morocco, Mozambique, Kenya, Rwanda, Zimbabwe, Togo, Eswatini, and South Africa.

In South Africa, the species has been sampled from the provinces Eastern Cape, KwaZulu-Natal, Limpopo, and Western Cape. Notable locations include Mountain Zebra National Park and Ithala Nature Reserve.

== Habitat and ecology ==
This species constructs three-dimensional webs in dark corners in a variety of microhabitats and is more common in the eastern parts of South Africa.

Latrodectus cinctus inhabits a large range at altitudes from 10 to 1513 m above sea level. It has been sampled from the Grassland, Indian Ocean Coastal Belt, Nama Karoo, Savanna, and Thicket biomes. The species is also found in crops such as citrus and tomatoes.

== Conservation ==
Latrodectus cinctus is listed as Least Concern by the South African National Biodiversity Institute due to its wide geographical range.
