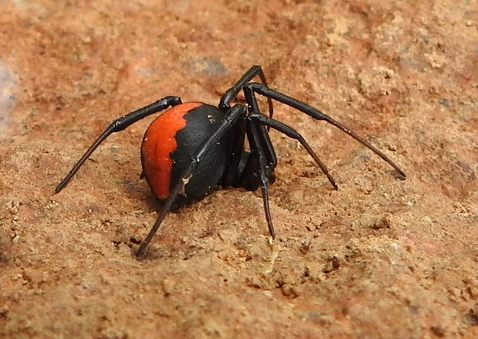

Scientific classification
- Kingdom: Animalia
- Phylum: Arthropoda
- Subphylum: Chelicerata
- Class: Arachnida
- Order: Araneae
- Infraorder: Araneomorphae
- Family: Theridiidae
- Genus: Latrodectus
- Species: L. erythromelas

Binomial name
- Latrodectus erythromelas Schmidt & Klaas, 1991

= Latrodectus erythromelas =

Species of spider

Latrodectus erythromelas is a species of venomous spider of the genus Latrodectus, commonly called widow spiders. It is native to India and Sri Lanka.

== Description ==
Female is larger than male, and the average total length is about 8.8 mm (0.35 in). Eyes are black, where eye region dark with blackish-red margins. The blackish carapace is much rounded and covered with fine hairs. The cephalothorax is also black and also covered with fine hair. On the dorsal surface of the cephalothorax, there is a prominent red stripe.
