= Latrodectus diaguita =

Scientific classification
- Kingdom: Animalia
- Phylum: Arthropoda
- Subphylum: Chelicerata
- Class: Arachnida
- Order: Araneae
- Infraorder: Araneomorphae
- Family: Theridiidae
- Genus: Latrodectus
- Species: L. diaguita

Binomial name
- Latrodectus diaguita Carcavallo, 1960

Black widow spider

Latrodectus diaguita is a species of black widow spider that is native to Argentina.
