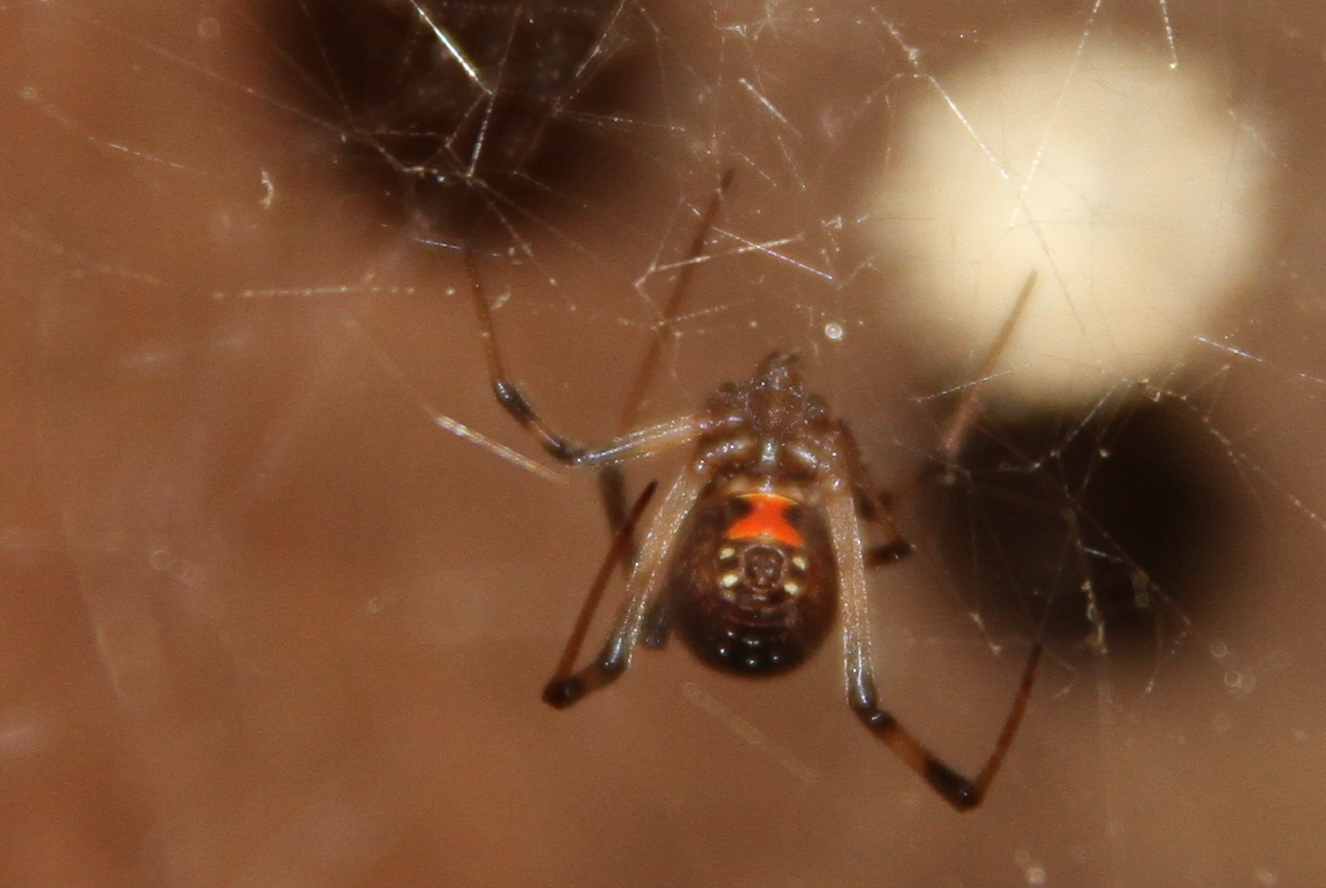

Scientific classification
- Domain: Eukaryota
- Kingdom: Animalia
- Phylum: Arthropoda
- Subphylum: Chelicerata
- Class: Arachnida
- Order: Araneae
- Infraorder: Araneomorphae
- Family: Theridiidae
- Genus: Latrodectus
- Species: L. antheratus

Binomial name
- Latrodectus antheratus (Badcock, 1932)

= Latrodectus antheratus =

Species of spider

Latrodectus antheratus is a venomous spider in the genus Latrodectus, native to Paraguay and Argentina. It can have some red on the back and has the red hourglass marking.
