= Latrodectus dahli =

Scientific classification
- Kingdom: Animalia
- Phylum: Arthropoda
- Subphylum: Chelicerata
- Class: Arachnida
- Order: Araneae
- Infraorder: Araneomorphae
- Family: Theridiidae
- Genus: Latrodectus
- Species: L. dahli

Binomial name
- Latrodectus dahli Levi, 1959

Species of venomous spider

Latrodectus dahli, also known as Dahl's widow spider, is a species of venomous widow spider.

This species has a wide distribution native to southern Europe, North Africa, Central Asia, and southwestern Asia. This includes countries like Turkey, Cyprus, Morocco, Turkmenistan, Azerbaijan, Kazakhstan, Iran and the UAE.
