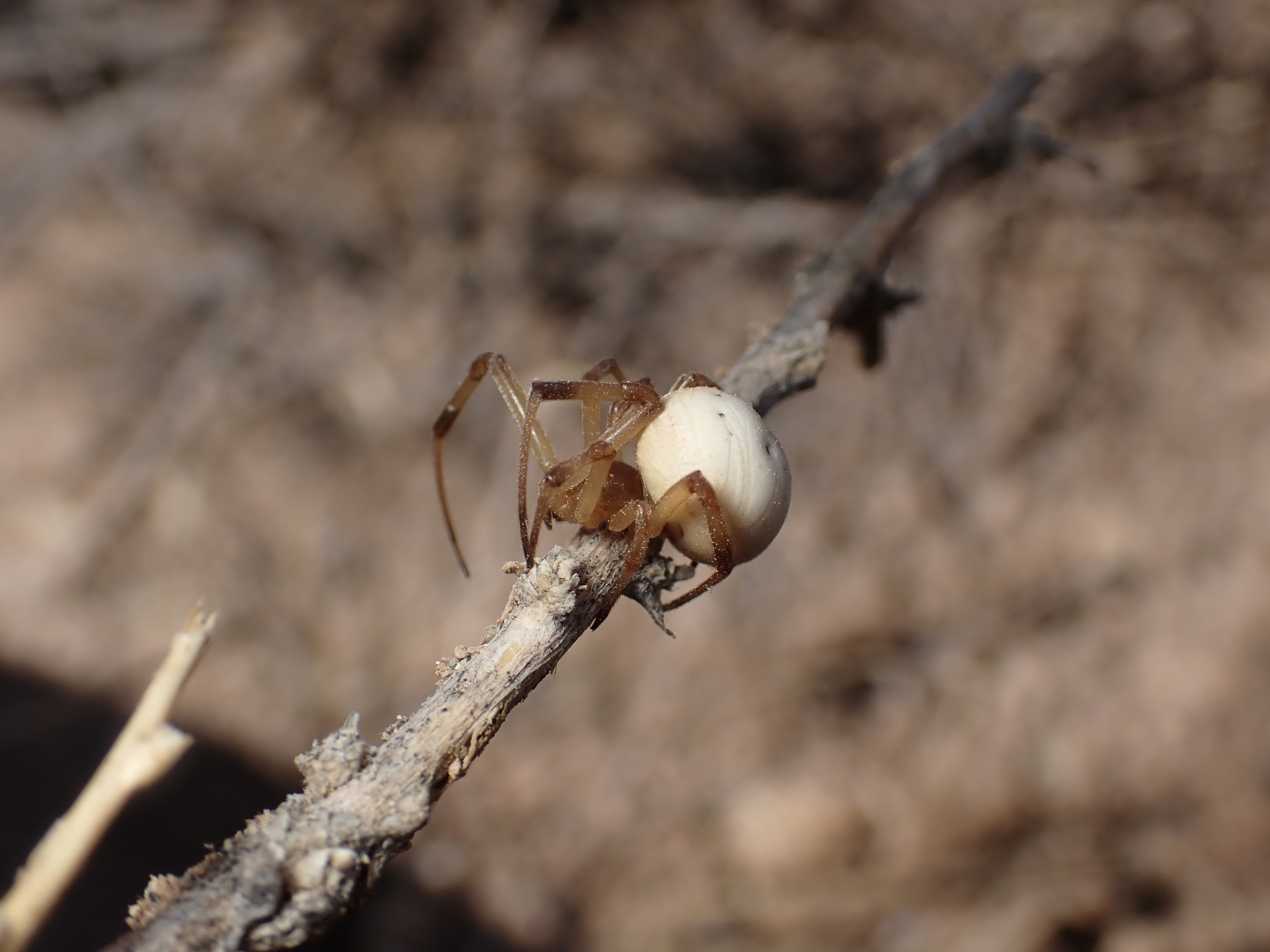

Scientific classification
- Kingdom: Animalia
- Phylum: Arthropoda
- Subphylum: Chelicerata
- Class: Arachnida
- Order: Araneae
- Infraorder: Araneomorphae
- Family: Theridiidae
- Genus: Latrodectus
- Species: L. pallidus

Binomial name
- Latrodectus pallidus O. P.-Cambridge, 1872

= Latrodectus pallidus =

Species of spider

Latrodectus pallidus is a species of spider commonly found throughout North Africa, the Middle East, and central Asia. A common name in English is the white widow spider, and it is known in Russian as белый каракурт, or white steppe spider. It is a member of the genus Latrodectus, which includes species known as widow spiders, which is placed in the family Theridiidae. It occurs both in the steppes of southern Russia, Kazakhstan, and other southwest Asian countries, as well as in the desert regions of the Middle East. Compared to other widow spiders in the region, the white widow spider is comparatively rare.

== Description ==
Unlike most species of widow spider, which are dark in colouration; the white widow spider is, as its name implies, light-coloured, with colouration ranging from beige to white, though with darker legs. The spider lacks the bright red markings found on other widow spiders such as the black widow, the redback spider, or L. tredecimguttatus. Other than colouration, the white widow is similar in appearance to other spiders of the genus.

When it comes to mating, widow spiders are a good example of high investment of males in a single mating. Males generally cohabit with a female for a long period of time, provide energy demanding courtship displays, and at times are cannibalized by the female after mating. Males are generally smaller than females because after they reach maturity, they do not feed and spend most of their lives searching for females.

== Medical significance ==
Like all Latrodectus species, L. pallidus has a bite which is venomous and can injure humans. While not nearly as toxic as the bite of L. mactans or L. hasselti, the white widow's bite is medically significant and can kill children and the infirm. Toxicology studies have reported that the venom of the white widow is similar in structure to that of L. tredecimguttatus. However, a poster published by the Egyptian Society of Natural Toxins describes L. pallidus venom as "moderately venomous", whereas L. tredecimguttatus is described as the most venomous spider in southern Europe.
