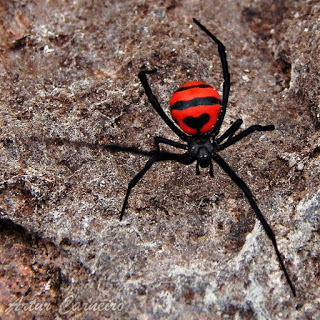

Scientific classification
- Kingdom: Animalia
- Phylum: Arthropoda
- Subphylum: Chelicerata
- Class: Arachnida
- Order: Araneae
- Infraorder: Araneomorphae
- Family: Theridiidae
- Genus: Latrodectus
- Species: L. curacaviensis

Binomial name
- Latrodectus curacaviensis (Müller, 1776)

= Latrodectus curacaviensis =

Species of spider

Latrodectus curacaviensis is a species of black widow spider, that belongs to the genus Latrodectus. It is known as the South American black widow, Brazilian black widow or Araña del trigo.

== Description ==
Like many black widow species, females are larger than males, growing up to 11–17 mm, with their body and legs black and red. Males are much smaller, known by their long legs, and white or brown color. Latrodectus curacaviensis is mainly nocturnal. It is not aggressive to humans, but females will attack to defend their egg sacs. It feeds on small insects. They have a distinct hourglass mark with a black diamond shape and four red triangles in a square.

== Distribution and habitat ==
It has been reported in the Lesser Antilles and South America. It is usually found under logs, in sheds, stone fireplaces, near trash and debris.

== Venom ==
The venom contains excitatory neurotoxins (alpha-latrotoxins). Bites usually deliver only small amounts of venom, which may result in dangerous symptoms mostly in children, old people and people with cardiovascular and respiratory problems. Reported symptoms include intense local pain. Systemic symptoms include sweating, rapid breathing, increased heart rate, eyelids swelling, salivation, rigid and painful abdominal muscles, nausea, vomiting and impaired sight. In a case that occurred in the state of Amazonas, Brazil, other symptoms were reported, such as muscle spasms, fever, chills and intense sweating – common symptoms of latrodectism, There are some reports of priapism.
