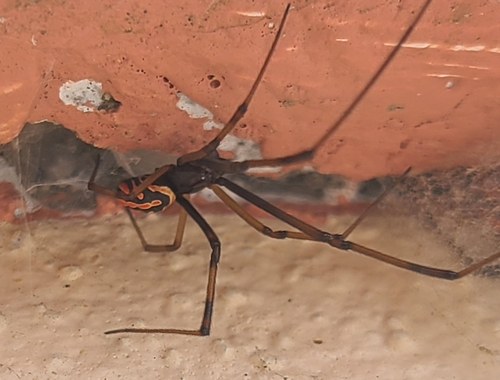
- L. occidentalis found in Manzanillo, Colima, Mexico

Scientific classification
- Kingdom: Animalia
- Phylum: Arthropoda
- Subphylum: Chelicerata
- Class: Arachnida
- Order: Araneae
- Infraorder: Araneomorphae
- Family: Theridiidae
- Genus: Latrodectus
- Species: L. occidentalis

Binomial name
- Latrodectus occidentalis Valdez-Mondragón, 2023

= Latrodectus occidentalis =

Newly described species of spider

Latrodectus occidentalis, the western black widow spider, is endemic to western Mexico, where it lives primarily in jungles and forests.

== Description ==
The western black widow spider, L. occidentalis, has a black cephalothorax and a globular abdomen. It is identified by its unique dorsal red stripes bordered by white and a ventral hourglass, mainly in females but also in males, which are smaller in size.

== Distribution and habitat ==
L. occidentalis is native to the lowland jungles or dry tropical forests of western Mexico, mainly in the states of Jalisco, Colima, Michoacán, Guerrero, Oaxaca, Morelos, and Guanajuato.

== Taxonomy ==
This species was first described in 2023 by Alejandro Valdez-Mondragón and Luis A. Cabrera-Espinosa. The holotype was a female collected in Cocula, Jalisco. This species was named because of its distribution in the western states of Mexico. It can be distinguished from the three other black widow spider species in Mexico (Latrodectus mactans, Latrodectus hesperus, and Latrodectus geometricus) by the ventral hourglass pattern, unlike in the other species, where it is divided or absent. The embolus of L. occidentalis has 3 coils located distally on the cynbium with the last coil extending medially, curving downwards along the retrolateral part of the palp, continuing ventrally, ending in a long, thin tip. In L. mactans and L. hesperus, the other native black widow spider species of Mexico, the embolus has 2 coils.

== Etymology ==
The species name occidentalis is a Latin adjective meaning 'western' and refers to the distribution of the species in western Mexico.

== Culture ==
It is commonly thought that seeing several of these spiders or finding them constantly assumes there is a plague. However, finding or seeing these spiders does not represent an invasion or plague, only that it's most likely the reproductive season of the spiders, which coincides with the rainy season, that multiple individuals could be observed.
