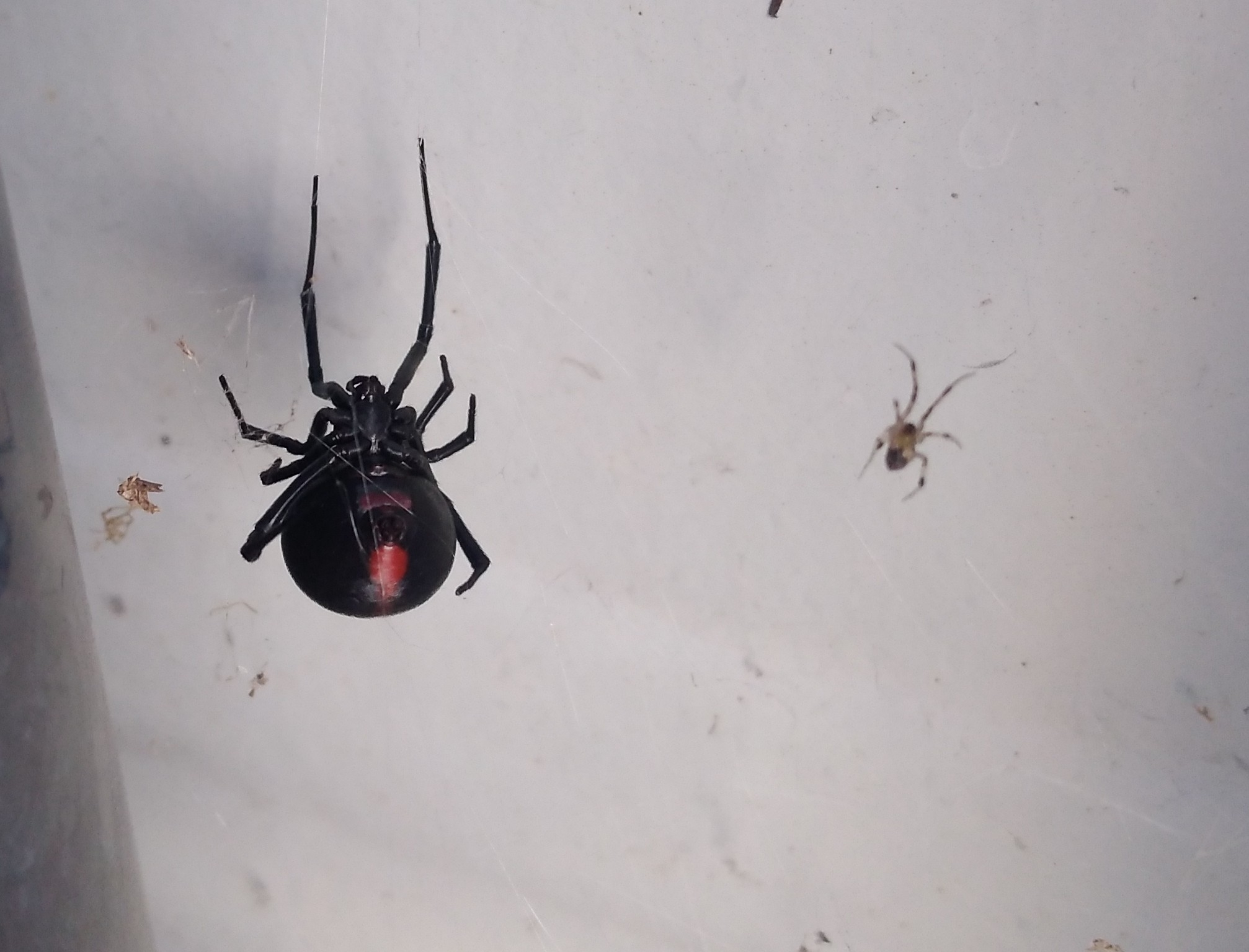
- Latrodectus mirabilis female with possibly Nephilingis cruentata of unknown gender

Scientific classification
- Kingdom: Animalia
- Phylum: Arthropoda
- Subphylum: Chelicerata
- Class: Arachnida
- Order: Araneae
- Infraorder: Araneomorphae
- Family: Theridiidae
- Genus: Latrodectus
- Species: L. mirabilis

Binomial name
- Latrodectus mirabilis (Holmberg, 1876, Argentina)

= Latrodectus mirabilis =

Species of spider

Latrodectus mirabilis (Spanish: cuyucha), sometimes (but rarely) known as black widow is a spider species that is native to most of South America in the genus Latrodectus of the family Theridiidae.

== Description ==
Instead of an "hourglass" pattern on the ventral side of this species, this spider has a red rectangle on its ventral side.

== Venom ==
This spider's bite has never been recorded but as with other Latrodectus species most people think the bites are venomous and causes latrodectism.

== Look-alikes ==
The False Black Widow looks more like this species than any other in Latrodectus except the Brown Widow.
