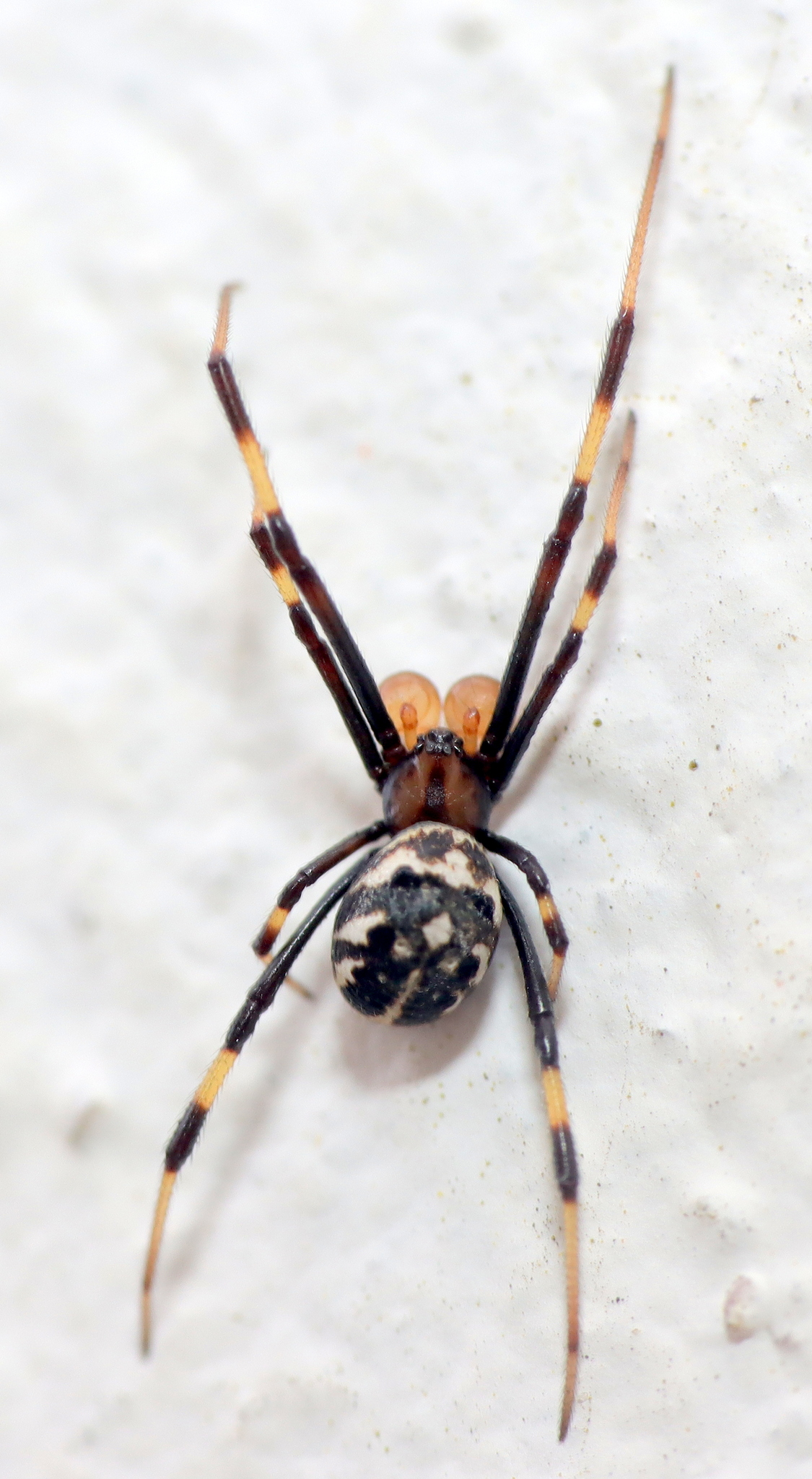
- male

Scientific classification
- Kingdom: Animalia
- Phylum: Arthropoda
- Subphylum: Chelicerata
- Class: Arachnida
- Order: Araneae
- Infraorder: Araneomorphae
- Family: Theridiidae
- Genus: Latrodectus
- Species: L. karrooensis

Binomial name
- Latrodectus karrooensis Smithers, 1944
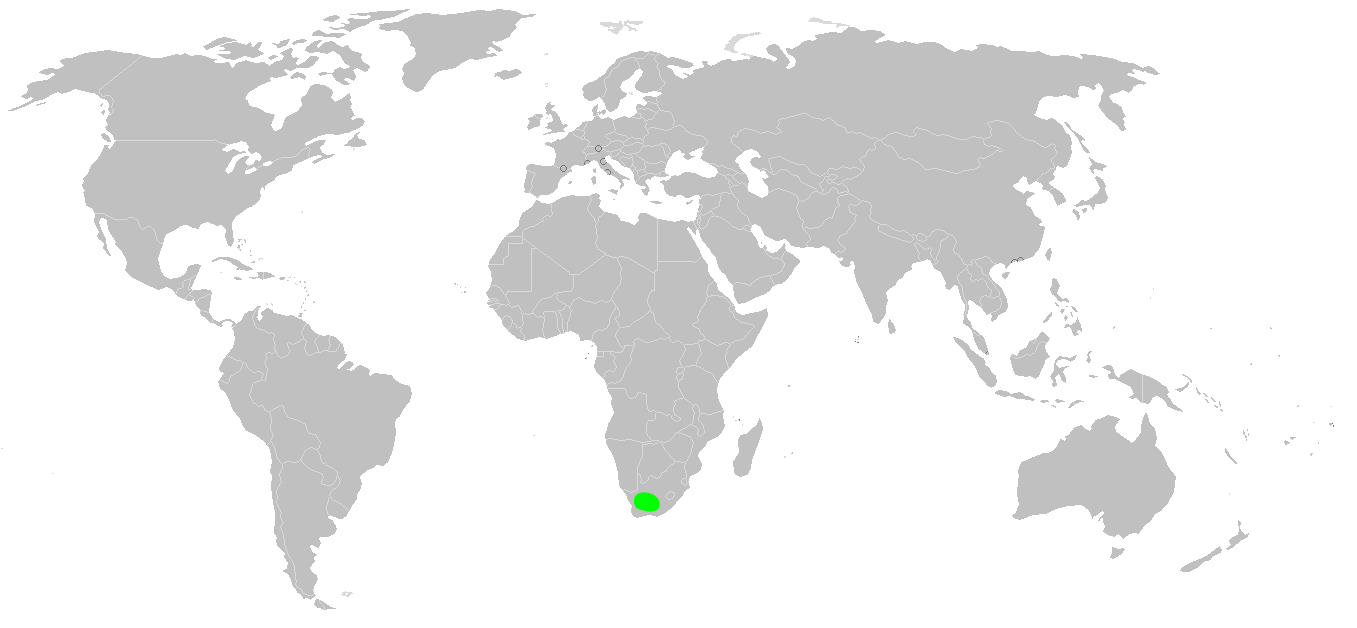

Synonyms
- Latrodectus mactans Levi, 1959

= Latrodectus karrooensis =

Species of spider

Latrodectus karrooensis is a species of spider in the family Theridiidae, endemic to South Africa. It is one of six species of Latrodectus found in southern Africa, four of which, including L. karrooensis, are known as black button or black widow spiders. Like all Latrodectus species, L. karrooensis has a neurotoxic venom. It acts on nerve endings, causing the very unpleasant symptoms of latrodectism when humans are bitten.

== Distribution ==
Latrodectus karrooensis is endemic to South Africa, where it is known from the Northern Cape and Western Cape provinces. Notable locations include Karoo National Park, Swartberg Nature Reserve, and the town of Hanover.

== Habitat and ecology ==
This species constructs three-dimensional webs in dark corners in a variety of microhabitats. The web and retreat are distinctive, with an inverted cup-shaped retreat having pebbles incorporated in the dome. The web is suspended in mid-air and has the basic structure of loose interconnected threads leading to the tightly woven retreat.

Latrodectus karrooensis inhabits a large range at altitudes from 648 to 1358 m above sea level. The species has been sampled from the Fynbos and Nama Karoo biomes.

== Conservation ==
Latrodectus karrooensis is listed as Least Concern by the South African National Biodiversity Institute due to its wide geographical range. The species is protected in Karoo National Park.

== Taxonomy ==
The species was originally described as a subspecies of L. indistinctus in 1944. In his 1994 revision, Lotz gave the subspecies species status and elected a new lectotype from Hanover in the Northern Cape.
