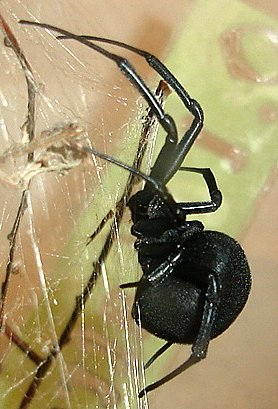
- Latrodectus liliane female preying upon Berberomeloe majalis

Scientific classification
- Kingdom: Animalia
- Phylum: Arthropoda
- Subphylum: Chelicerata
- Class: Arachnida
- Order: Araneae
- Infraorder: Araneomorphae
- Family: Theridiidae
- Genus: Latrodectus
- Species: L. lilianae

Binomial name
- Latrodectus lilianae Melic, 2000

= Latrodectus lilianae =

Species of spider

Latrodectus lilianae is a species of widow spider commonly found in Portugal, Morocco and Spain. It is marked with small, white and orange markings on its abdomen near its cephalothorax. It is primarily found in the steppes of the Iberian Peninsula, unlike its American cousins who reside closer to humans.

Like all Latrodectus species, the venom of L. lilianae is considered medically significant. Venom injection can lead to systemic symptoms such as severe pain, a fever or other health complications. There are no recorded deaths caused by a bite from this species. The LD-50 of L. lilianae venom is currently unknown.
