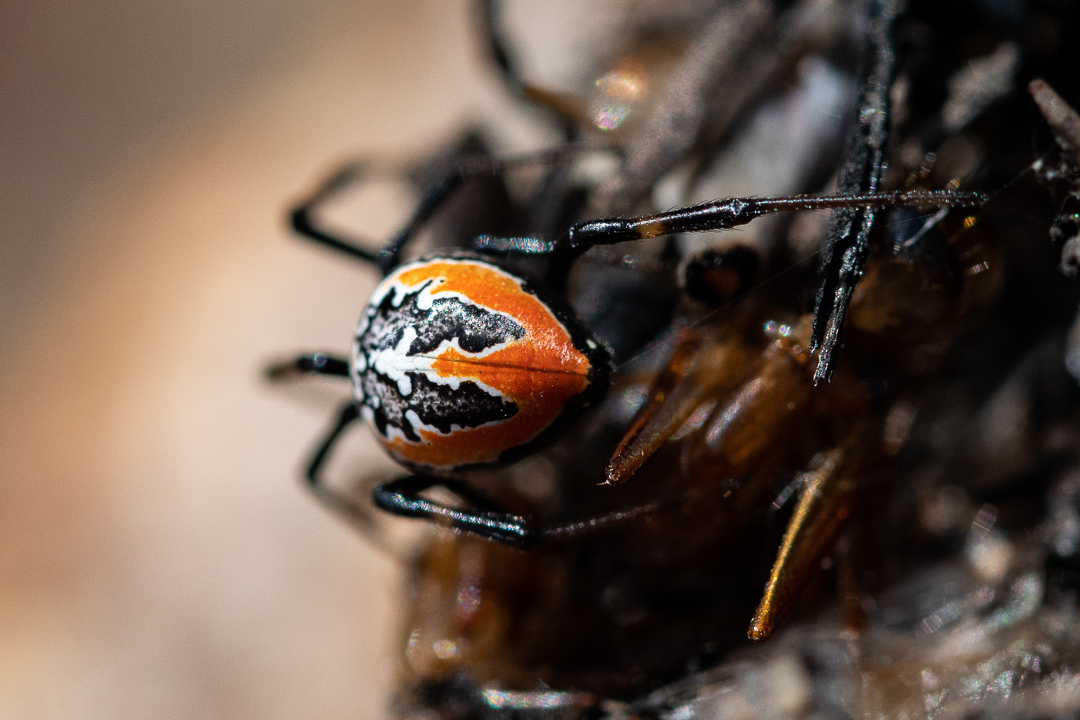
- Female
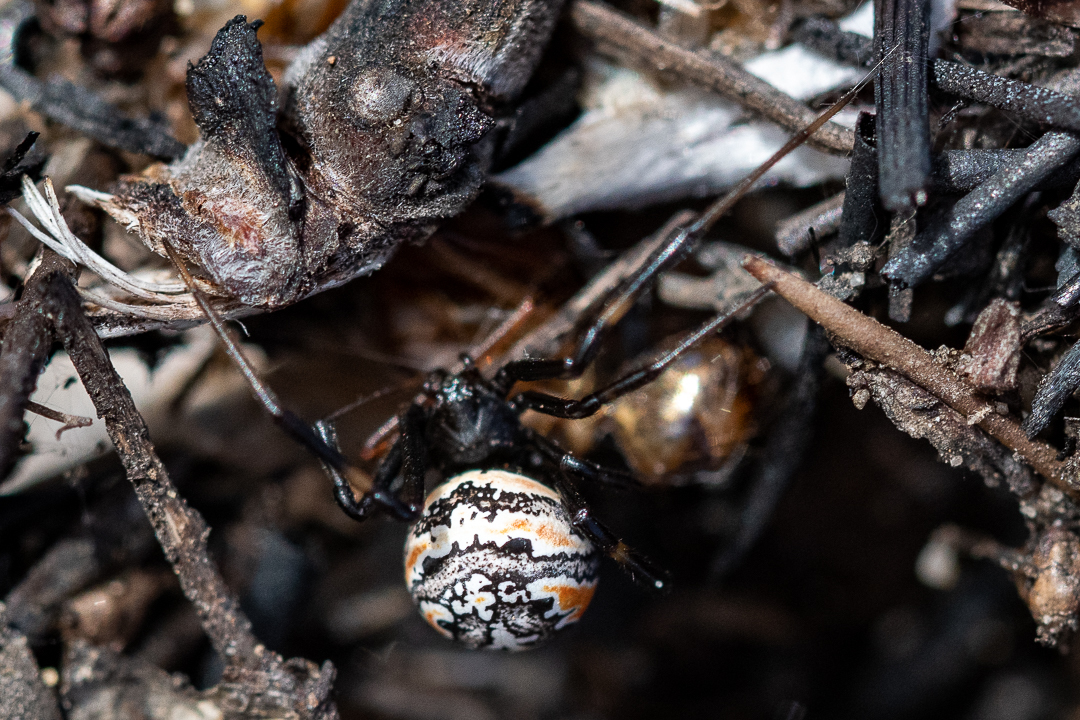
- Female

Scientific classification
- Kingdom: Animalia
- Phylum: Arthropoda
- Subphylum: Chelicerata
- Class: Arachnida
- Order: Araneae
- Infraorder: Araneomorphae
- Family: Theridiidae
- Genus: Latrodectus
- Species: L. indistinctus

Binomial name
- Latrodectus indistinctus O. P-Cambridge, 1904

= Latrodectus indistinctus =

Species of spider

Latrodectus indistinctus is a species of spider in the family Theridiidae, found in Namibia and South Africa. It is one of six species of Latrodectus found in southern Africa, four of which, including L. indistinctus, are known as black button or black widow spiders. Like all Latrodectus species, L. indistinctus has a neurotoxic venom. It acts on nerve endings, causing the very unpleasant symptoms of latrodectism when humans are bitten.

== Distribution ==
Latrodectus indistinctus is found in Namibia and South Africa.

In South Africa, the species is known from the Northern Cape and Western Cape provinces. Notable locations include Richtersveld Transfrontier National Park, De Hoop Nature Reserve, Table Mountain National Park, and Swartberg Nature Reserve.

== Habitat and ecology ==
This species constructs three-dimensional webs in dark corners in a variety of microhabitats. Females are sedentary by nature. The web consists of three distinct portions: the nest, the tunnel, and the delaying threads. The nest is constructed at the base of small bushes, tufts of grass or stubble, or among heaps of loose debris, situated low down, often on the ground, and usually in the centre of such cover or at least well concealed. Unlike L. geometricus, no nest of L. indistinctus has been recorded from the immediate vicinity of a building.

Latrodectus indistinctus inhabits a large range at altitudes from 7 to 1405 m above sea level. The species has been sampled from the Desert, Grassland, and Fynbos biomes and has been recorded from pistachio orchards.

Found in habitats such as tangled bushes, uncut grass, tall vegetation in dry places, agricultural areas and forests.

== Description and behavior ==
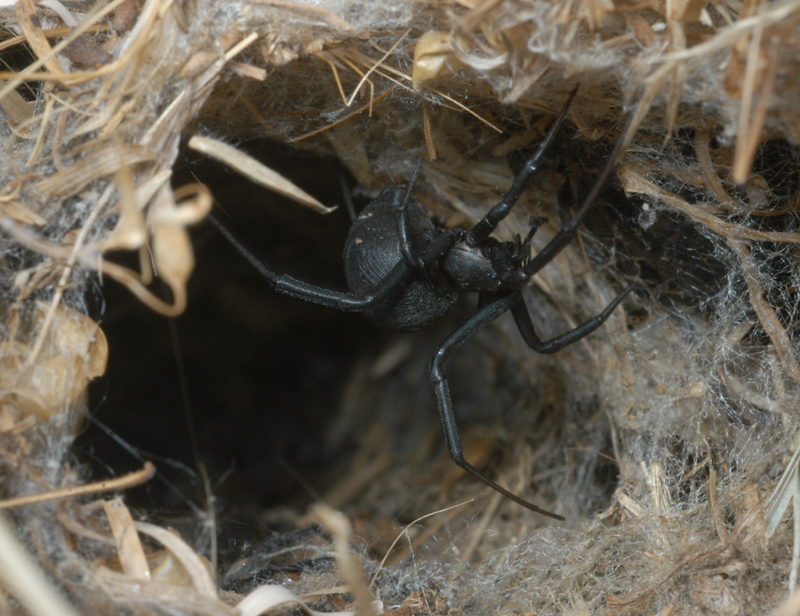

Like all spiders in the genus Latrodectus, females are larger than males. Females range from 7 to 16 mm, and the males 2.5 to 5 mm. In maturity, most retain at least short red stripes radiating upward from the tip of the dorsal abdomen.

Like many black widows, it is not aggressive. Its defense method when it feels threatened is to drop to the ground and play dead. Their egg sacks are usually hung in bush vegetation, where prey, which includes insects and arthropods, is available nearby. Females will occasionally attack to defend their eggs.

== Venom ==
They have neurotoxins known as latrotoxins. Within 15 minutes after a bite there is intense pain, burning sensation, and swelling. Systemic effects, such as intense muscle pain and cramps, can occur hour later. Other symptoms include anxiety, slurred speech, feeling sick, headaches, sweating, and fever. Rapid pulse, increased blood pressure, and tightness in the chest together with difficulty breathing are important symptoms, which are usually more dangerous for children and elderly people with cardiovascular and respiratory diseases.

In a case that occurred in 2016, in South Africa, in a 38-year-old man reported symptoms such as intense muscle pain, erythema, stiffness at the location of the bite that radiated to the trunk, arm and neck, muscle spasms, and mild tachycardia.

== Conservation ==
Latrodectus indistinctus is listed as Least Concern by the South African National Biodiversity Institute due to its wide geographical range. The species is protected in Richtersveld Transfrontier National Park, Table Mountain National Park, Swartberg National Park, and Karoo National Park.

== Taxonomy ==
The species was revised by Lotz in 1994.
