= Latrodectus garbae =

Scientific classification
- Kingdom: Animalia
- Phylum: Arthropoda
- Subphylum: Chelicerata
- Class: Arachnida
- Order: Araneae
- Infraorder: Araneomorphae
- Family: Theridiidae
- Genus: Latrodectus
- Species: L. garbae

Binomial name
- Latrodectus garbae Rueda & Realpe, 2021

Species of widow spider

Latrodectus garbae is a species of venomous widow spider native to Colombia.

This species has a dark brown to shiny black color across its entire body with its joints and legs showing no color variation. The abdomen has a intense red color.
