= Button spider =

Various spiders found in South Africa

Button spider is a common name used in Southern Africa to refer to local members of the spider genus Latrodectus in the family Theridiidae. There are both black and brown button spiders in Southern Africa, known elsewhere as widow spiders. Seven Latrodectus species can be found in Southern Africa; six of them are native, one is possibly imported.

== Venom ==
All species of Latrodectus are venomous to humans, and their bite constitutes a medical emergency. Envenomation by these spiders can be fatal to children and ill or infirm adults but there has never been a documented fatality from any button spider species in Southern Africa. Ordinarily, the body mass of a healthy adult is sufficient to dilute the venom to less than a fatal concentration. In most species, only the female spider is capable of effectively delivering the venom to humans as the males have much smaller chelicerae.

Although rarely fatal, the symptoms of the bite are often incredibly painful and medical attention is recommended following any Latrodectus species bite, as complications relating to the bite can arise. Treatment of bites is usually supportive, administering opiates for pain and benzodiazepines for spasms. An antidote is available in South Africa for the bites of both L. indistinctus and L. geometricus, however it is only used for severe cases of envenomation due to its potentially severe side effects. Individuals who are allergic to the venom may also require epinephrine (adrenaline) or diphenhydramine to treat subsequent anaphylaxis.

== Button spider species ==
The species are informally divided into two groups, based on their color:

The black button spiders are black or brown in color, and include the following species:

- L. cinctus (east coast button spider)
- L. indistinctus (west coast button spider)
- L. karooensis (Karoo button spider)
- L. renivulvatus (inland button spider)

All of these spiders are native to Southern Africa.

The brown button spiders are lighter in color than the black button spiders and have a red hourglass marking under the abdomen (not above) with exception of the L. umbukwane which has both red markings above and below the opisthosoma (abdomen); there are three brown button species:

- L. geometricus (brown button spider)
- L. rhodesienses (Zimbabwe button spider)
- L. umbukwane (Phinda button spider)

L. geometricus is found in many parts of the world,(including in the United States) and it is known as the brown widow spider. it is unknown where this species' origins are. L. rhodesienses is native to Africa. Both brown button species have the famed hourglass markings of the black widow from other countries on their abdomens, but are generally lighter in colour. The brown button spiders' venom is less toxic to humans than the venom of the black buttons.
