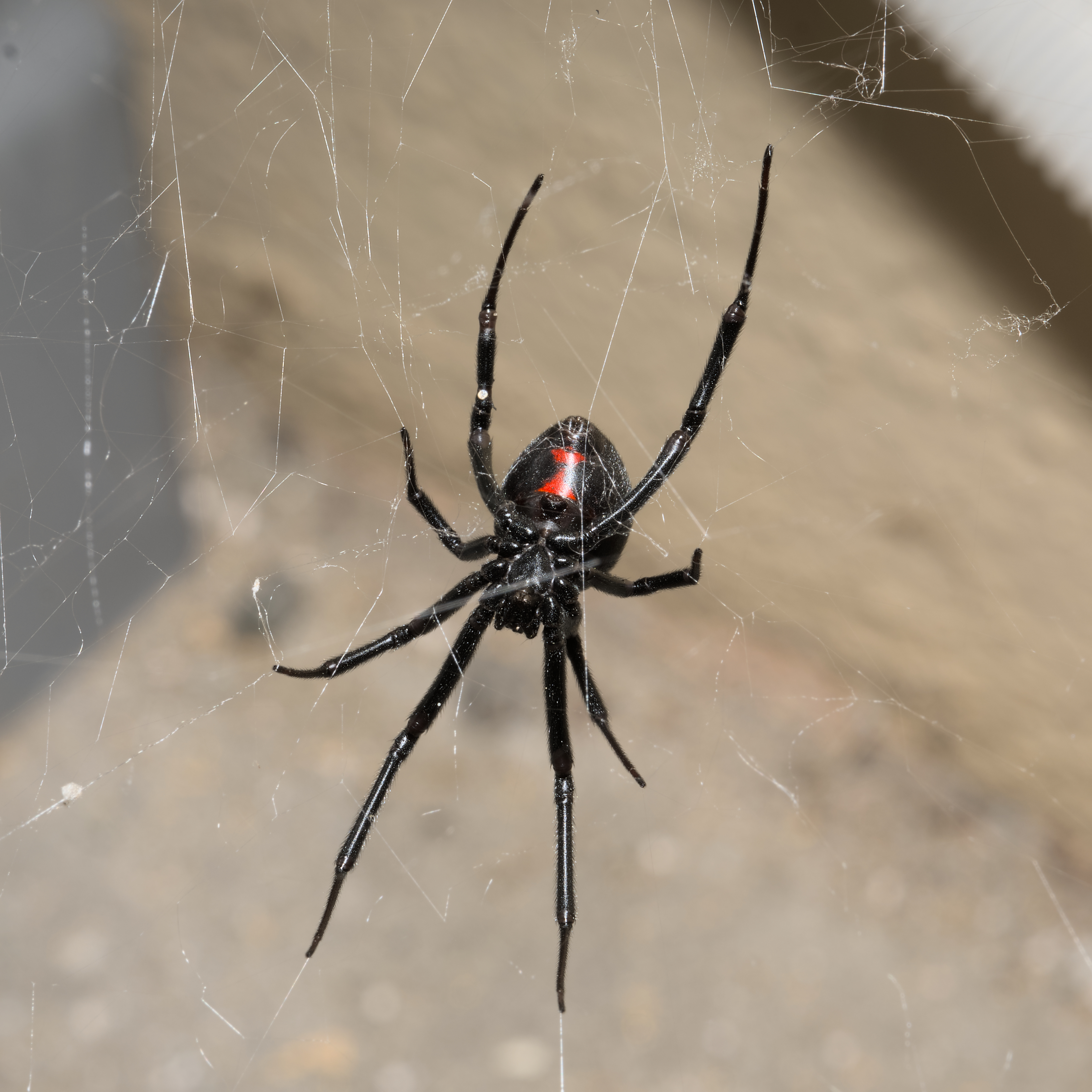
- Latrodectus hesperus female

Scientific classification
- Kingdom: Animalia
- Phylum: Arthropoda
- Subphylum: Chelicerata
- Class: Arachnida
- Order: Araneae
- Infraorder: Araneomorphae
- Family: Theridiidae
- Genus: Latrodectus
- Species: L. hesperus

Binomial name
- Latrodectus hesperus Chamberlin & Ivie, 1935

= Latrodectus hesperus =

Species of spider

Latrodectus hesperus, the western black widow spider or western widow, is a venomous spider species found in western regions of North America. The female's body is 14–16 mm (1/2 in) in length and is black, often with an hourglass-shaped red mark on the lower abdomen. This "hourglass" mark can be red, yellow, and on rare occasions, white. The male of the species is around half this length, and generally a beige color with lighter striping on the abdomen. The population was previously described as a subspecies of Latrodectus mactans, and it is closely related to the northern species Latrodectus variolus. The species, as with others of the genus, build irregular or tangled webs. Unlike the spiral webs or the funnel-shaped webs of some other spiders, the strands of a Latrodectus' web have no obvious overall organization.

Female black widows have potent venom containing a neurotoxin (α-latrotoxin) active against a range of organisms. In humans, symptoms of this venom include pain, nausea, vomiting, goosebumps, and localized sweating.

In historical literature, fatalities were reported at anywhere between 0.5% and 12%, but studies within the past several decades have been unable to confirm any fatalities from any of the U.S. species of Latrodectus (e.g. zero fatalities among 23,409 documented Latrodectus bites from 2000 through 2008). The female's consumption of the male after courtship, a cannibalistic and suicidal behavior observed in Latrodectus hasseltii, is rare in this species. Male western widows may breed several times during their relatively short lifespans. Males are known to show preference for mating with well-fed females over starved ones, taking cues from the females' webs.

== Range ==
Latrodectus hesperus can be found in the South-western regions of Canada, from British Columbia to Manitoba, along the Pacific Coast and throughout Texas, Oklahoma and Kansas in the U.S., and in Mexico. They are commonly found near the Canada-US border, as well as less commonly throughout the grasslands of the Canadian Prairies in Western Canada.

== Mating ==
=== Courtship behavior ===
The female is stimulated upon contact of a male's web, and vice versa. Male and female L. hesperus produce sexually-specific scents that are combined with their silk; each sex responds by initiating mating when it comes in contact with a web of the opposite sex. On initiating courting, the male L. hesperus will utilize its tarsi to tap the threads of the female's web. The male will continue this tapping gesture with its pedipalps as it actively begins to explore the web. This exploration is intermixed with resting bouts. The male's body spasms, producing a high frequency vibration throughout its abdomen. In many instances, the female will not accept the male's sexual display and will scare the male away. In some instances, the females will violently jerk their abdomen, similar to courting male displays, which ultimately leads to a positive reaction from the males and a more successful insemination.

One strategy performed by the male L. hesperus to ensure a successful courtship is to minimize the female's escape route options within its own web. This is accomplished by the male severing the female's web at various locations that it believes could provide the female with a course of action to avoid the male. Once the male has successfully made contact with the female's body, it swoons the female by gently stroking various parts of its body. The male then creates what is known as the "bridal veil", which is simply silk thrown onto the female.

The time spent on courting varies tremendously and can be as short as ten minutes or as long as two hours. A male's pedipalps may get injured or partially destroyed in the act of copulation, which leaves it unable to mate again in the future. This may be the reason that many male mates are found dead in the female's web after copulation. Females can consume these dead males for nutrients to improve their own reproductive success.

=== Female choosiness ===
Female choosiness can be both evolutionarily advantageous and disadvantageous, depending on whether the risk of delaying copulation will inevitably pay off with a better mate, or if it will instead cost the female its whole potential of producing offspring. The female L. hesperus has the potential to possess more than one mate during their lifespan. This is in part due to the male-bias within the sexually active population of the spider. This sex-bias allows the males to engage in what is known as "scramble competition". Scramble competition means that no male possesses a monopoly over the resource, which in this case is the female spider, because there is a finite amount of this resource; those who exploit it faster will come out on top. There are multiple ways in which the female L. hesperus can guarantee its right to choose, one of which is eating the male before copulation. However, as mentioned, this is an extremely rare behaviour in L. hesperus. The female receives chemical cues given off by other nearby L. hesperus that indicate the population density, and therefore give them a notion as to whether their choosiness will pay off or not.

== Hunting and diet ==
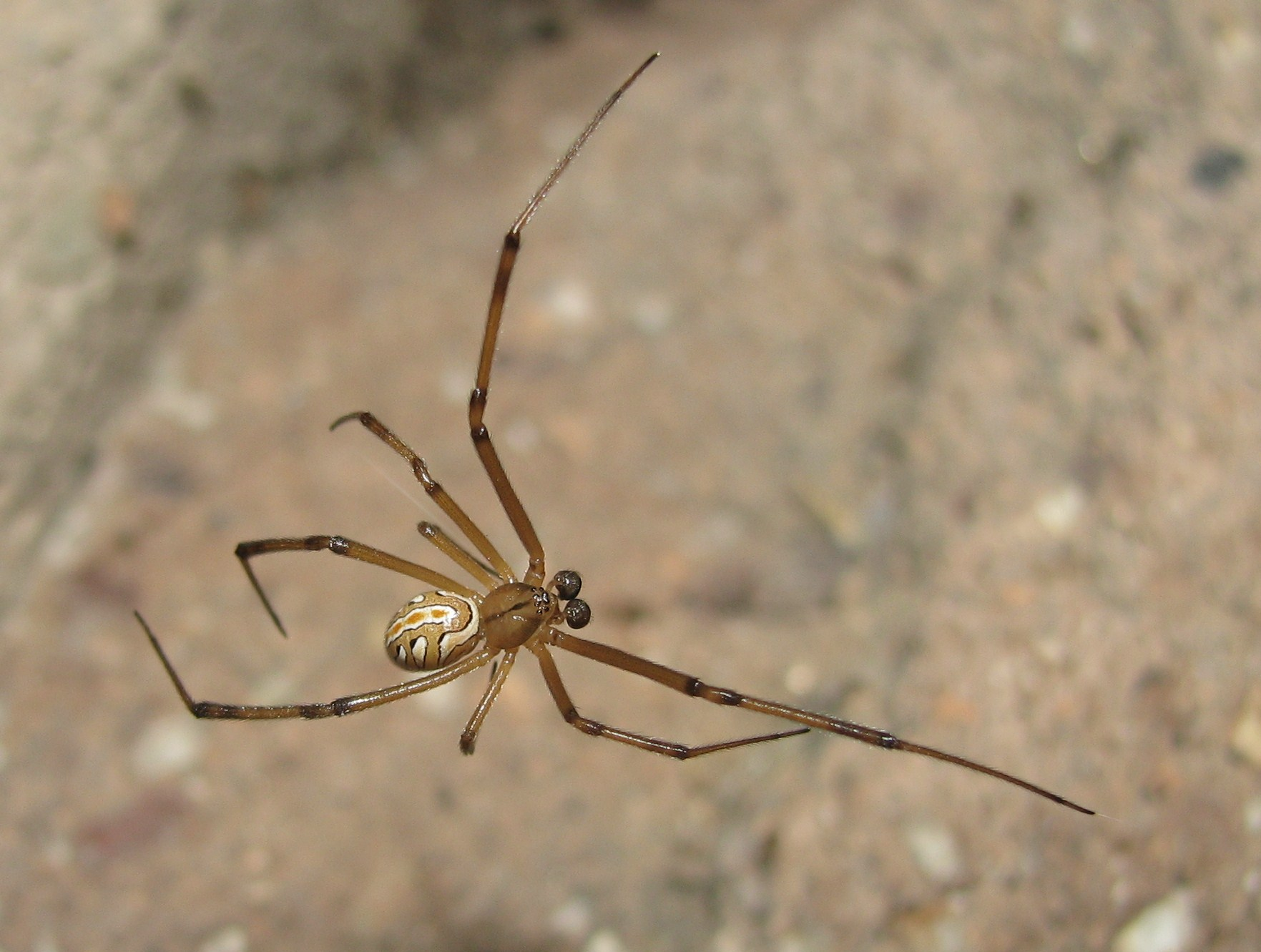
Male western black widow: This image shows the enlarged palpal organs (large dark disks) at the tip of the pedipalps and the spider's eight eyes when the image is expanded.

=== Hunting ===
Latrodectus hesperus frequently hangs upside down near the center of the web and waits for any insects to enter the web to attack. It bites its victim, injecting the venom, then wraps it in silk. There are multiple aspects of this spider's web that serve the purpose of capturing prey. The web incorporates hanging threads that have a very sticky substance on them, called gumfoot threads. The thread will break once prey catches on it, creating a tensile force within the web that pulls the line along with the prey up to the spider. L. hesperus seeks refuge in the location from which the web originates and emerges. The web of L. hesperus also allows for locomotive action by the spider when attacking prey through a sheet of silk. In the months of May through October, there is a significant increase in the amount of prey caught by L. hesperus, presumably because these are the months in which the female produces its egg sacs, and in which the offspring are born and their survival is dependent on their mother's ability to feed them.

=== Prey cues ===
Latrodectus hesperus follows prey cues when determining where to settle down. The female L. hesperus is able to detect chemical cues from their prey. As a by-product of this detection, L. hesperus is more likely to build a home in an area that is expressing a high degree of chemical prey cues. This finding may grant us the ability of controlling L. hesperus infestations. By killing off the prey of L. hesperus, there will be a correlated side-effect that pushes L. hesperus to relocate to a location where there are more available prey.

=== Diet ===
Like other web-building spiders, L. hesperus are polyphagous and feed on prey from eight different arthropod orders. In one study in British Columbia, the orders Coleoptera and Hymenoptera accounted for the majority of the spiders' prey; the majority of prey within Coleoptera were darkling beetles, weevils, and ground beetles, and the most common Hymenoptera were ants, wasps, and bumblebees. The peak activity of hymenopterans in this study was May through September in British Columbia, paralleling a spike in consumption by L. hesperus during these months.

Latrodectus hesperus is an "opportunistic cannibal". There are three circumstances under which L. hesperus may feed on conspecifics: when alternative prey options are scarce; when a spider is very hungry; in self-defense during antagonistic bouts.

=== Sibling cannibalism ===
As previously discussed, L. hesperus is an opportunistic cannibal. There of course is variation amongst L. hesperus in terms of how dire a situation must become, or how hungry the spider must be, to resort to cannibalism. Specifically, within siblingships, the range of time lapsed before the spider siblings fell victim to cannibalism varied from two days to three weeks. There appears to be a direct relationship between the length of time a L. hesperus will last before falling back on sibling cannibalism and the amount of maternal investment put into their egg sac. In other words, the more investment a mother puts into its egg sac, the longer its offspring will go before engaging in sibling cannibalism as their source of prey and nutrition.

== Webs and silks ==
=== Silks ===
The silk produced by L. hesperus is strongly adhesive. The silk has a fiber at the center covered by some droplets of liquid adhesive protein. When rubbing against one's fingers, it feels like the texture of rubber. The droplets are about twenty times larger than the center fiber's diameter, and are visible to the naked eye.

The ultimate strength and other physical properties of L. hesperus silk were found to be similar to the properties of silk from orb-weaving spiders. The ultimate strength for the three kinds of silk measured in the study was about 1000 MPa (145,000 psi). The ultimate strength reported in a previous study for Trichonephila edulis was 1290±160 MPa (188,000 psi). The ultimate strength of mild steel is about 800 MPa (116,000 psi).

Latrodectus hesperus produces three different types of silk: dragline silk, inner egg case silk, and scaffolding silk. Analysis of the amino acid composition of the various silks produced by L. hesperus show that both dragline silk and scaffolding silk are primarily composed of alanine and glycine, in fact neither cysteine nor methionine were detected at all in these silks. In the inner egg case silk, although alanine remained an abundant amino acid, its abundance was less so in this silk than the others.

Latrodectus hesperus' silk contains sexual pheromones which are perceived by the opposite sex upon contact with the web. The males are able to locate the female and begin courting behavior in response to female pheromones. The female curtails its predatory reflexes against the male in response to male pheromones.

=== Web architecture ===
L. hesperus produces cobwebs. Cobwebs differ from orb webs, and their architecture can be broken down into three sections. Two sections are utilized to capture prey, the gumfoot threads and the mesh region. The third section provides the structural support for the web and is known as the scaffold threads.

=== Web behavior ===
Latrodectus hesperus reacts to changes in prey capture by altering its web-spinning behavior. When the spider reaches satiety, it will decrease its energy expenditure on building the features of the web specifically purposed for prey capture. This is evolutionarily advantageous for the spider because it is already satiated; it would be a waste of energy to seek out more nutrients. Although there is a decrease in prey-capturing aspects of the web, the overall silk production remains steady, or in some cases will increase. L. hesperus also decrease silk investment into webs when preparing for offspring by alternatively increasing silk investment into egg sac production.

== Defensive behavior ==
The black widow spiders face some predators, like mice, which are omnivorous and larger than the black widow. Juveniles and female adult L. hesperus can eject a chunk of viscid silk toward potential predators. This silk is not toxic, but its mechanical irritation can thwart most predators. However, adult males are unable to produce this defensive silk, presumably because they need to conserve energy for reproduction during their relatively short life span. However, this defensive behavior is very important to females, which are under heavy predation pressure. Black widow spiders spend much time on web construction at night, which is also an active time for ground mice. If the webs are low above ground, it is easy for mice and other predators to attack from below. Since the spider will stay largely stationary at the web hub, such attacks are mostly successful if there is no defensive behavior.

== Venom ==
Latrodectus hesperus' bite is similar to that of other Latrodectus species because of their relatedness. The venom is exuded from the spiders' fangs and injected into the predator or prey. The spiders' prey is paralyzed by the venom, which enables their future digestion. For humans, the venom behaves like a neurotoxin (α-latrotoxin), affecting the neurotransmitter acetylcholine. This causes a condition known as latrodectism, with symptoms such as nausea, vomiting, pain at the bite, stomach pain, and goosebumps. The female is more of a threat than the male in this species, however it is only aggressive when it is protecting its eggs. Not only are the females fangs larger than the males, but their venomous glands are also more distinct. The venom is composed of proteins, peptides, and proteases. The venom causes an excess release of neurotransmitters which can cause a slew of symptoms. Treatments include painkillers and antivenom if the toxicity is severe enough.

== Gallery ==
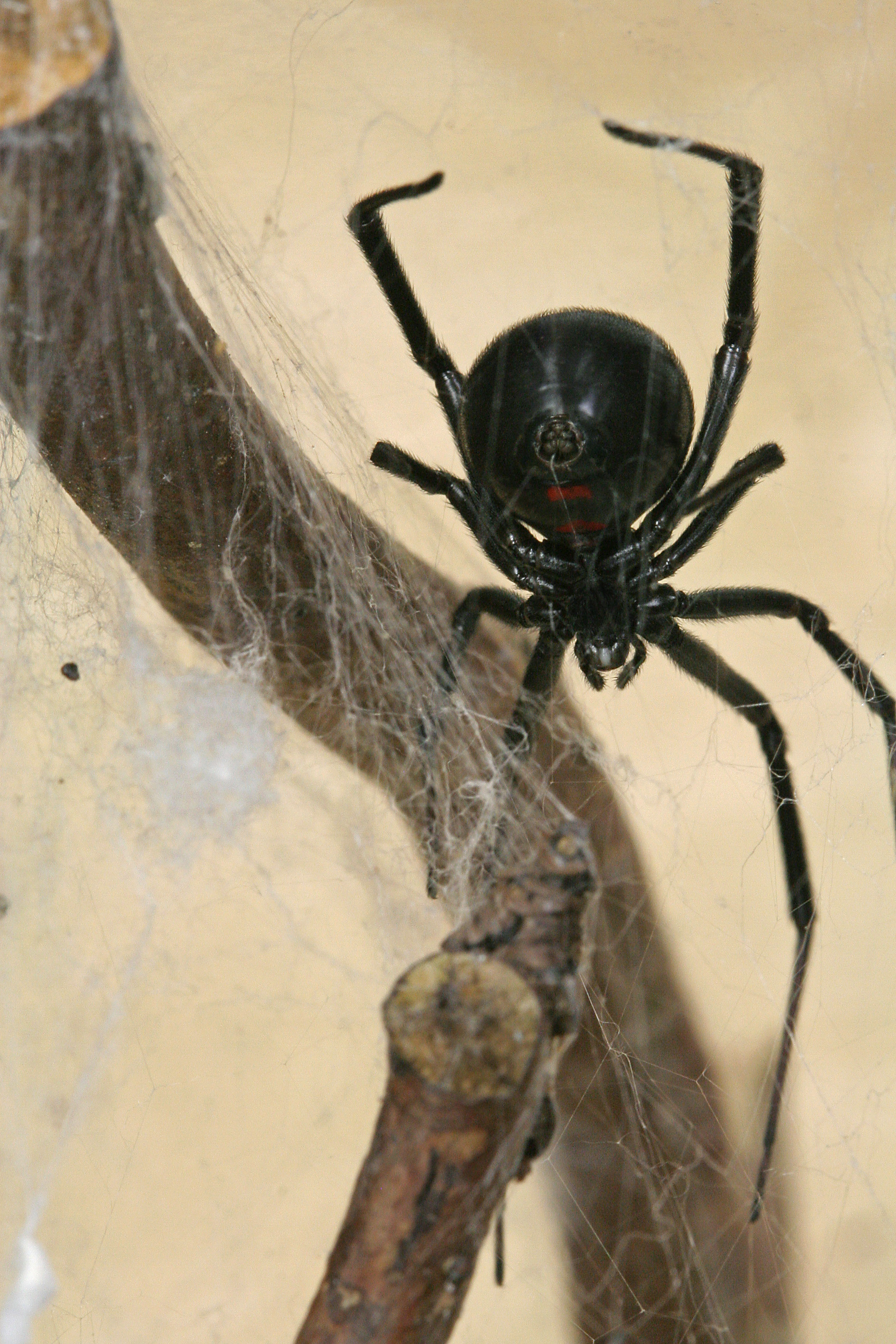
Female

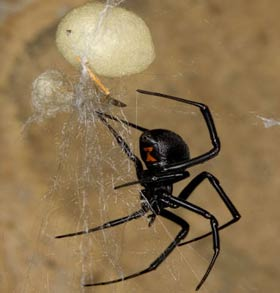
Female with egg sac

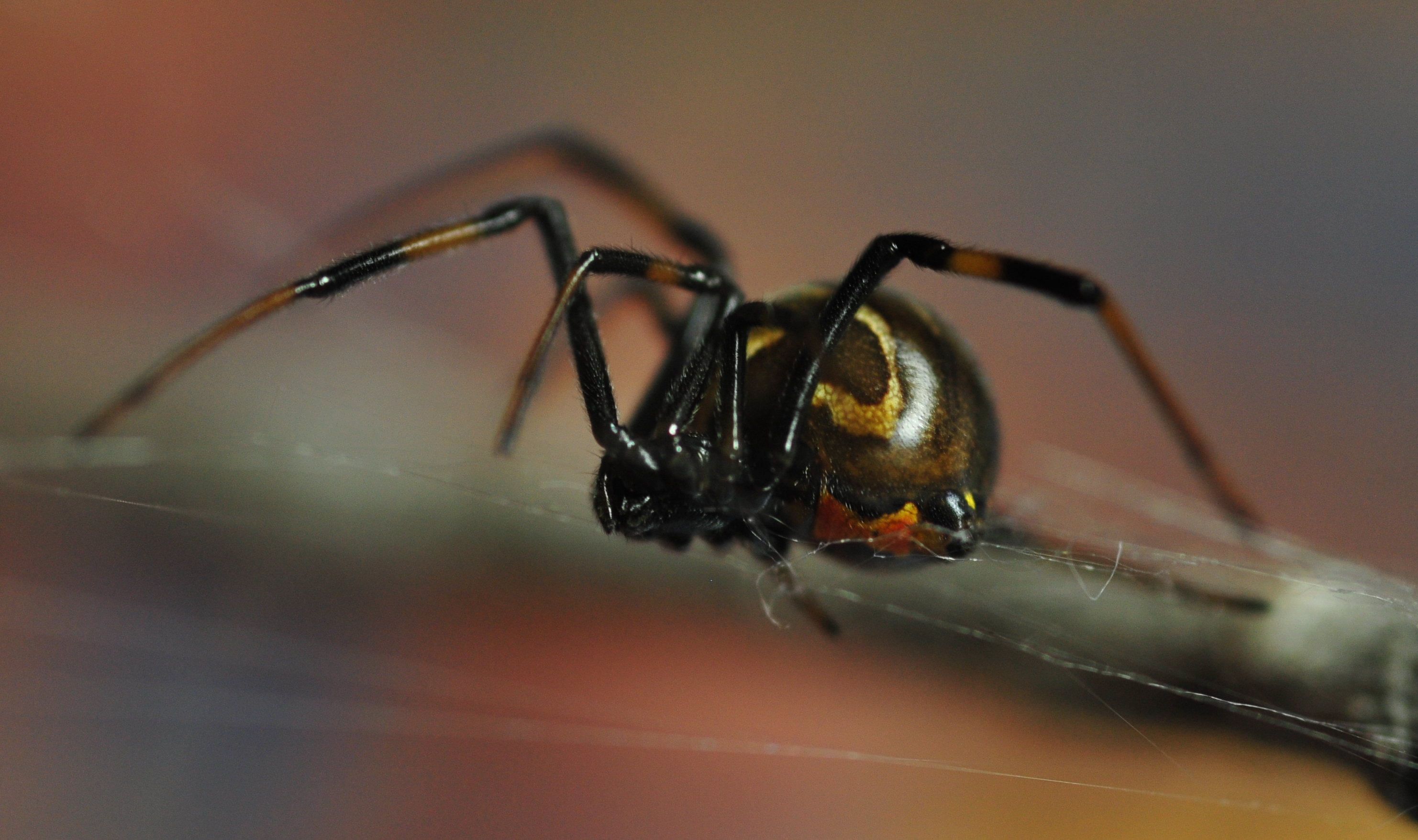
Immature female

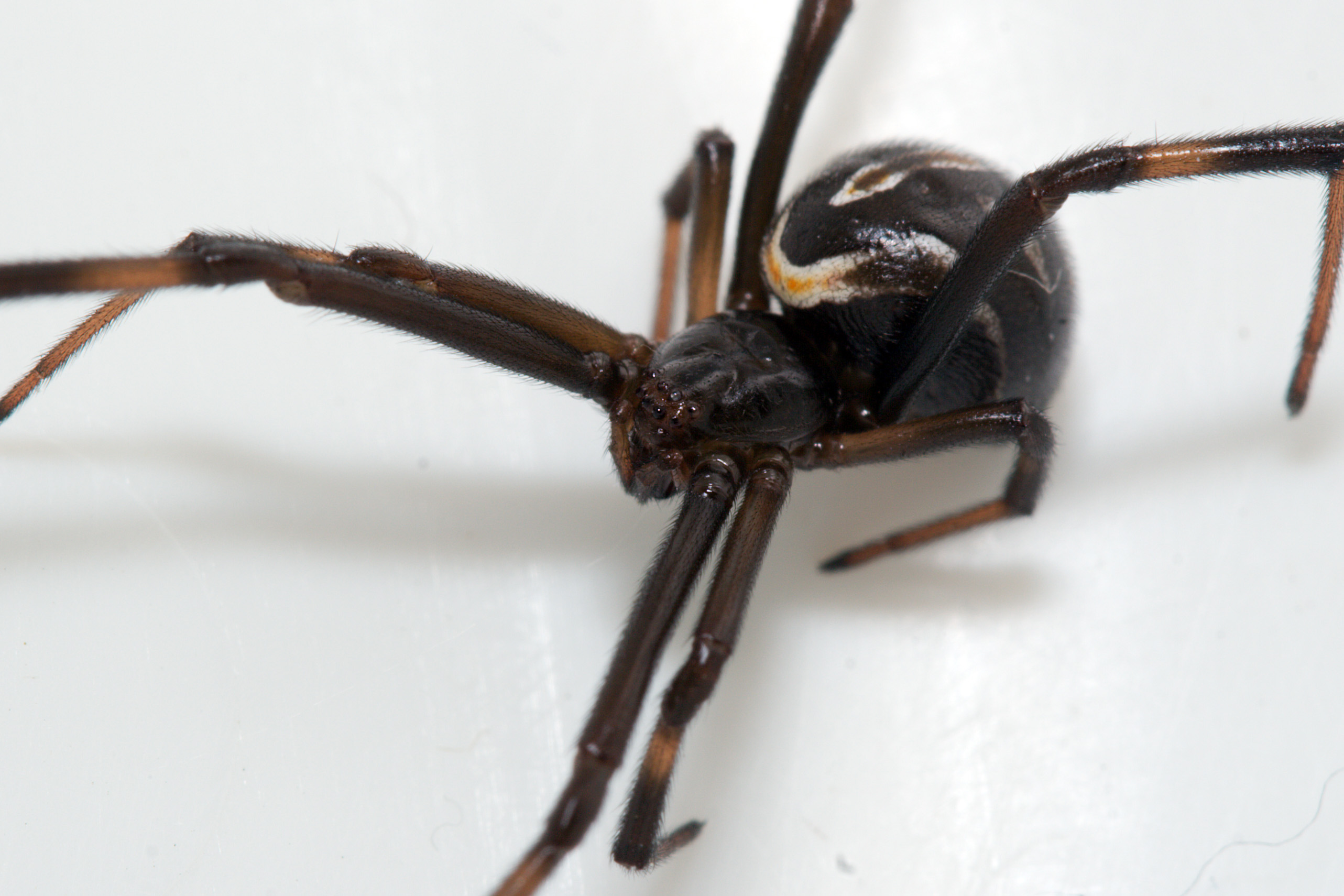
Immature female

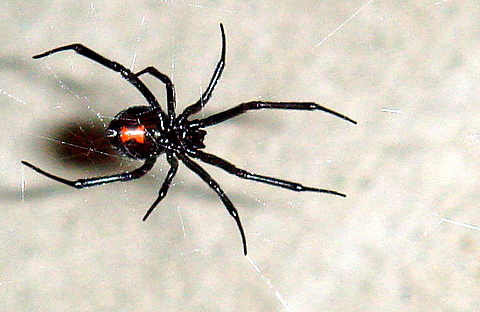
Female with typical red hourglass on abdomen

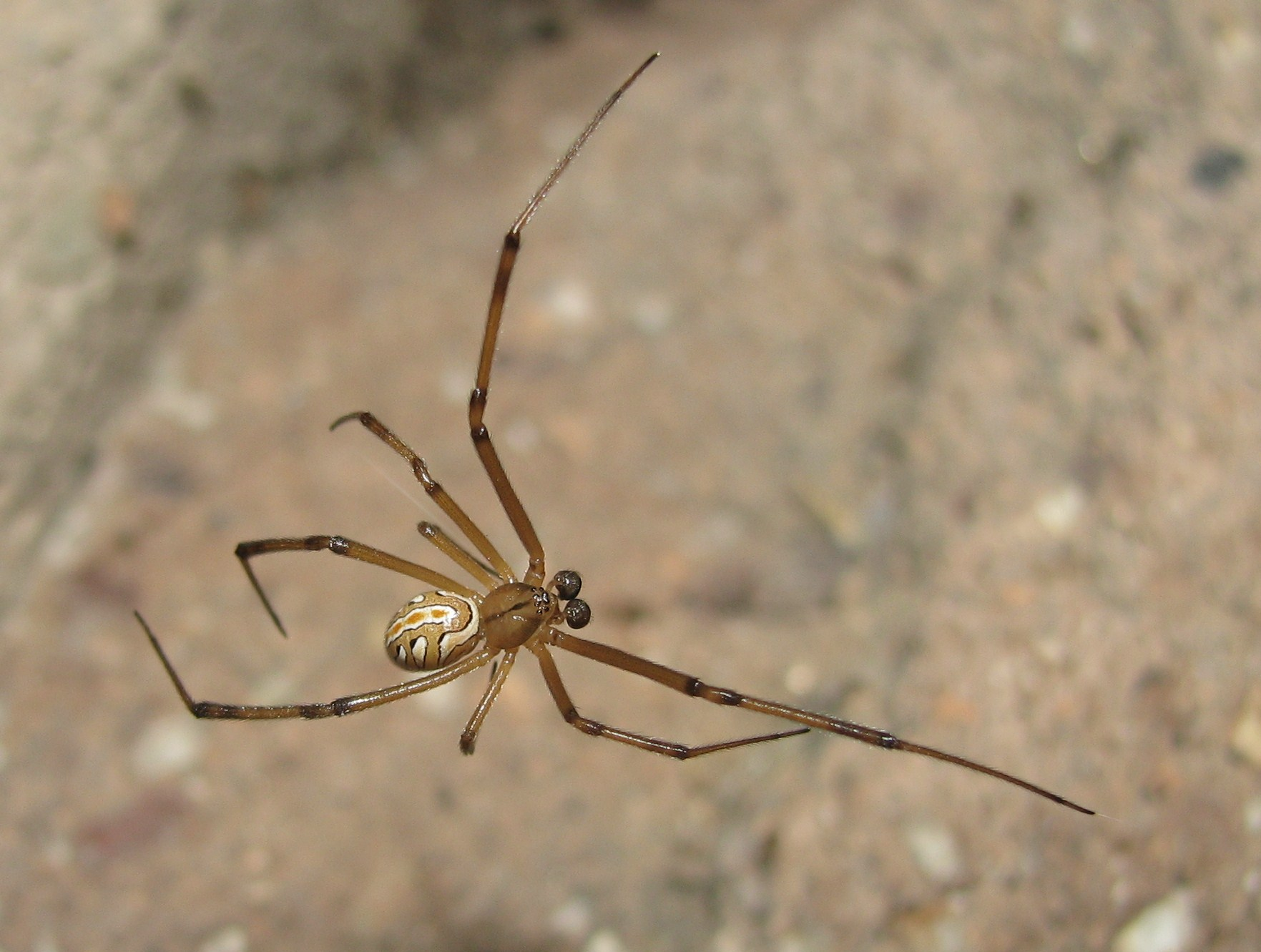
Male, dorsal view (light coloration)

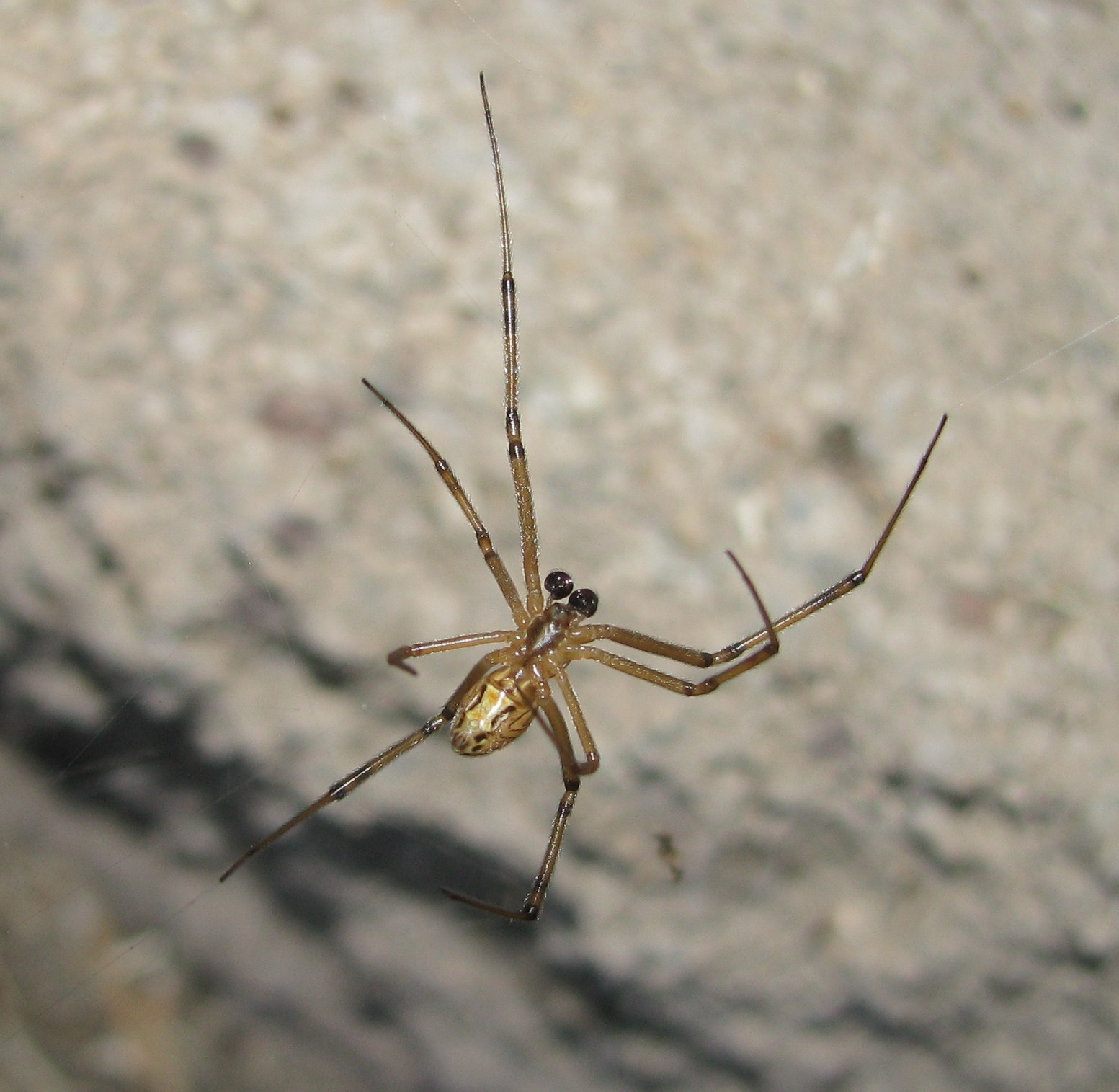
Male, ventral view (light coloration)

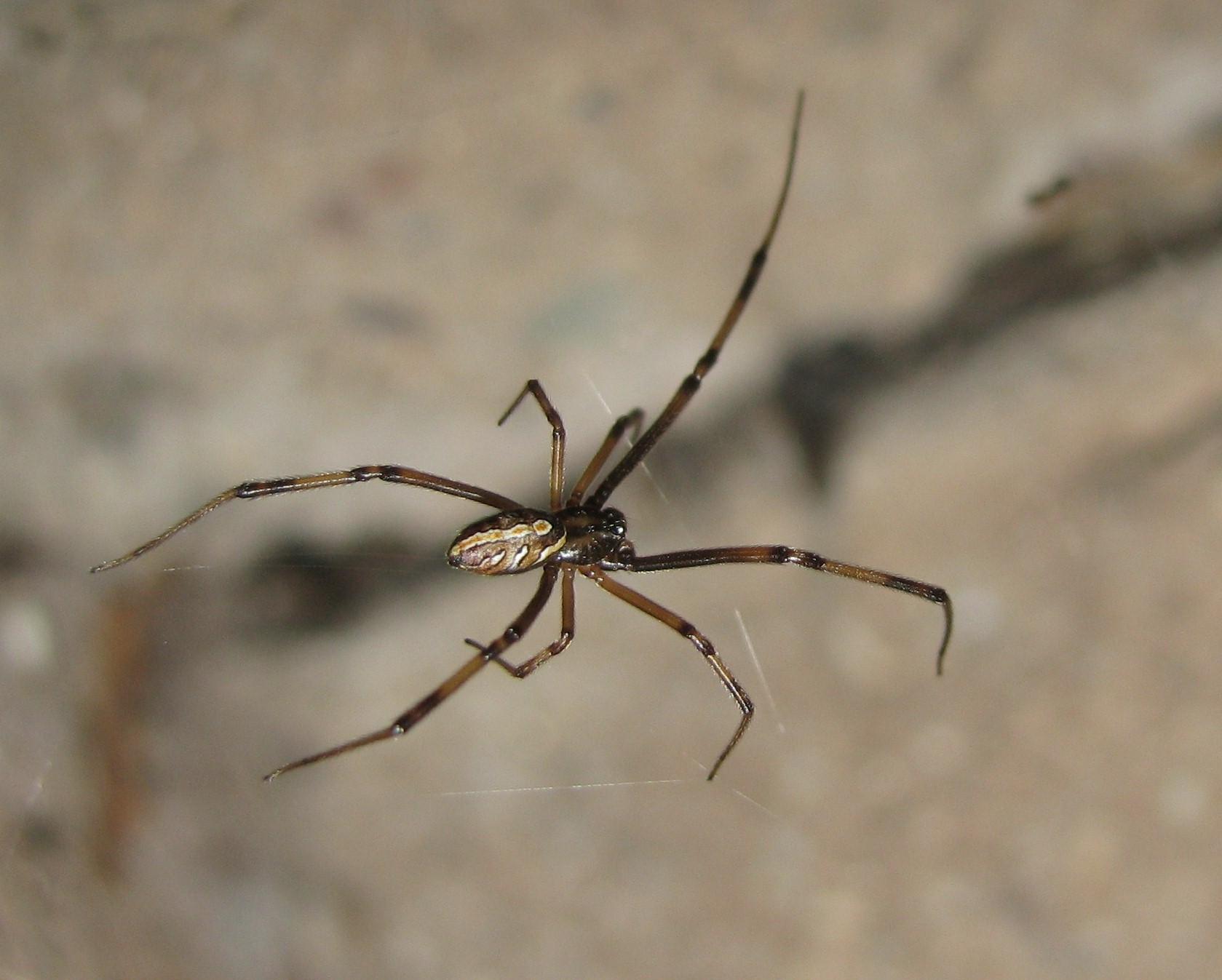
Male, dorsal view (dark coloration)

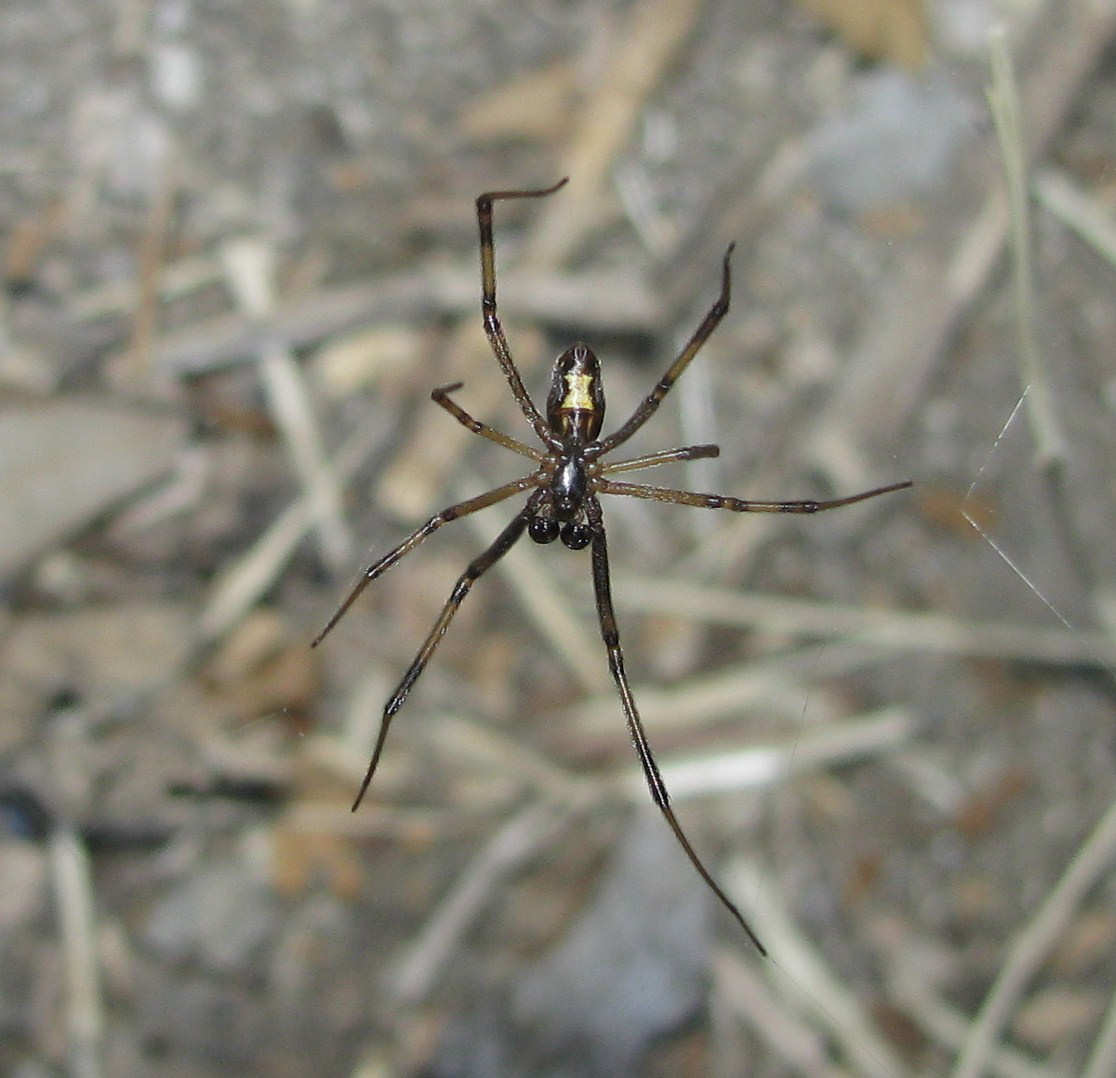
Male, ventral view (dark coloration)

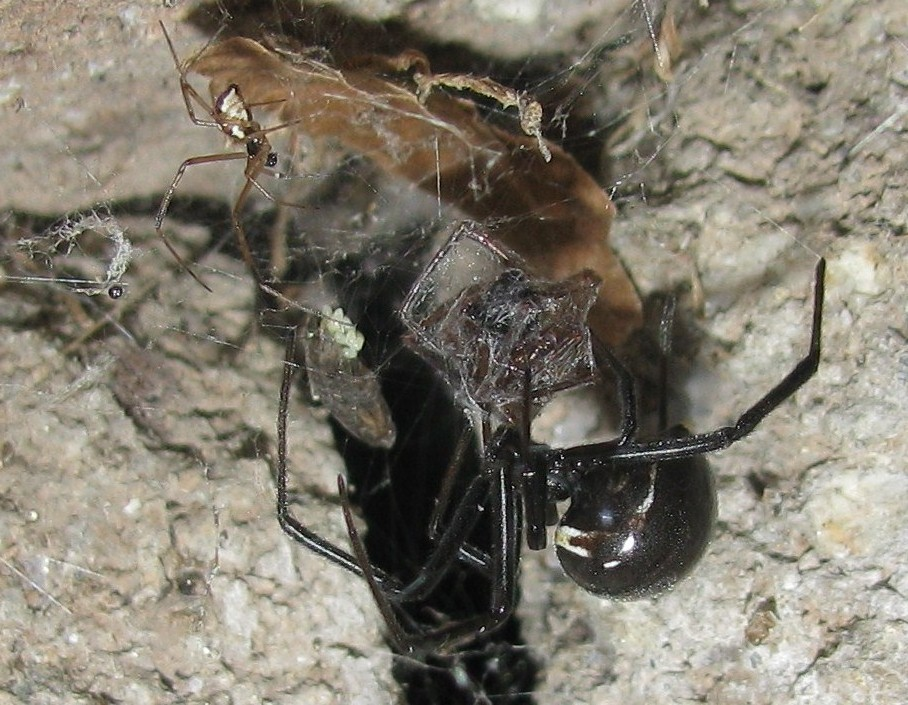
Female, front view, with moth and funnel web spider prey

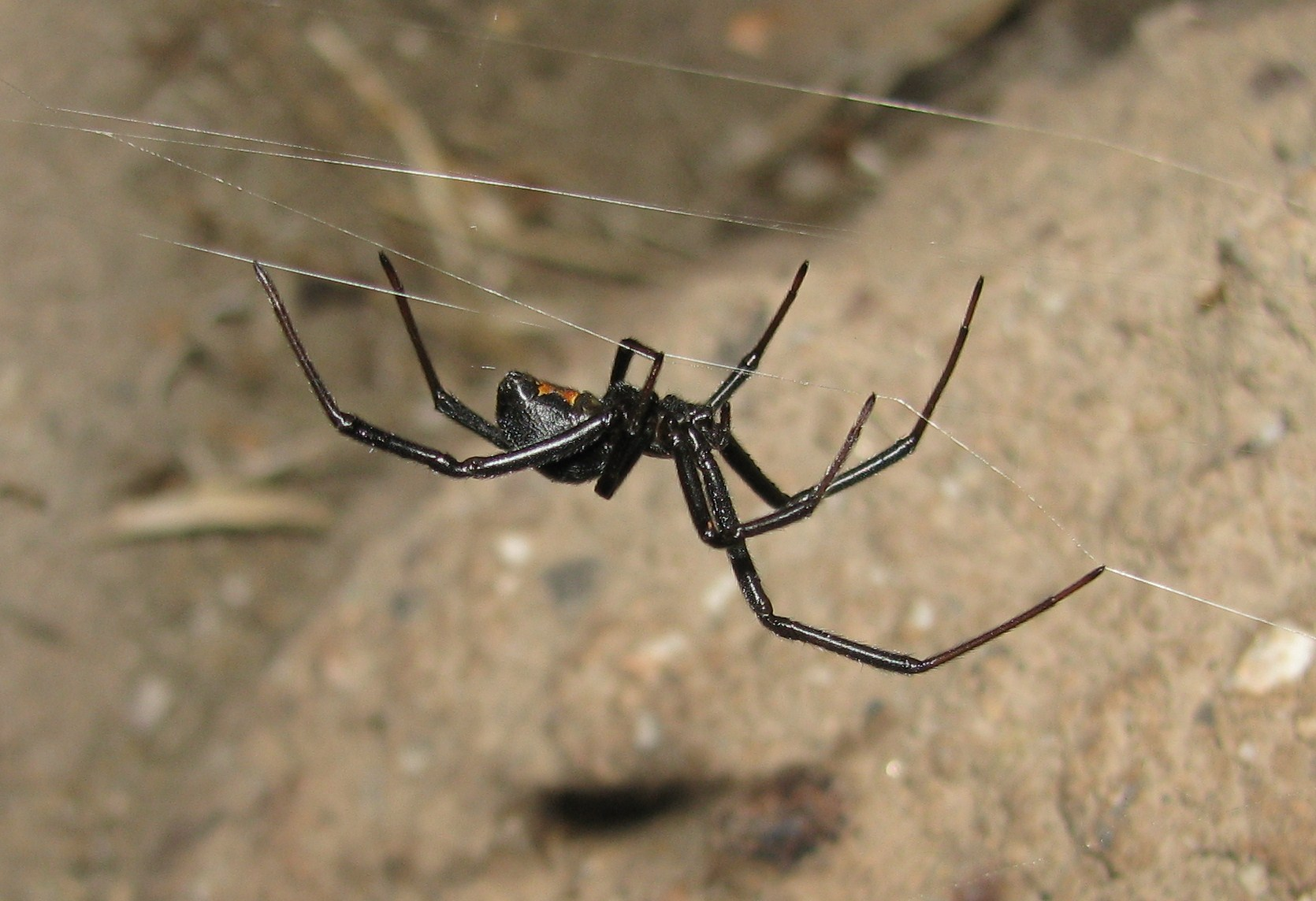
Female, side view

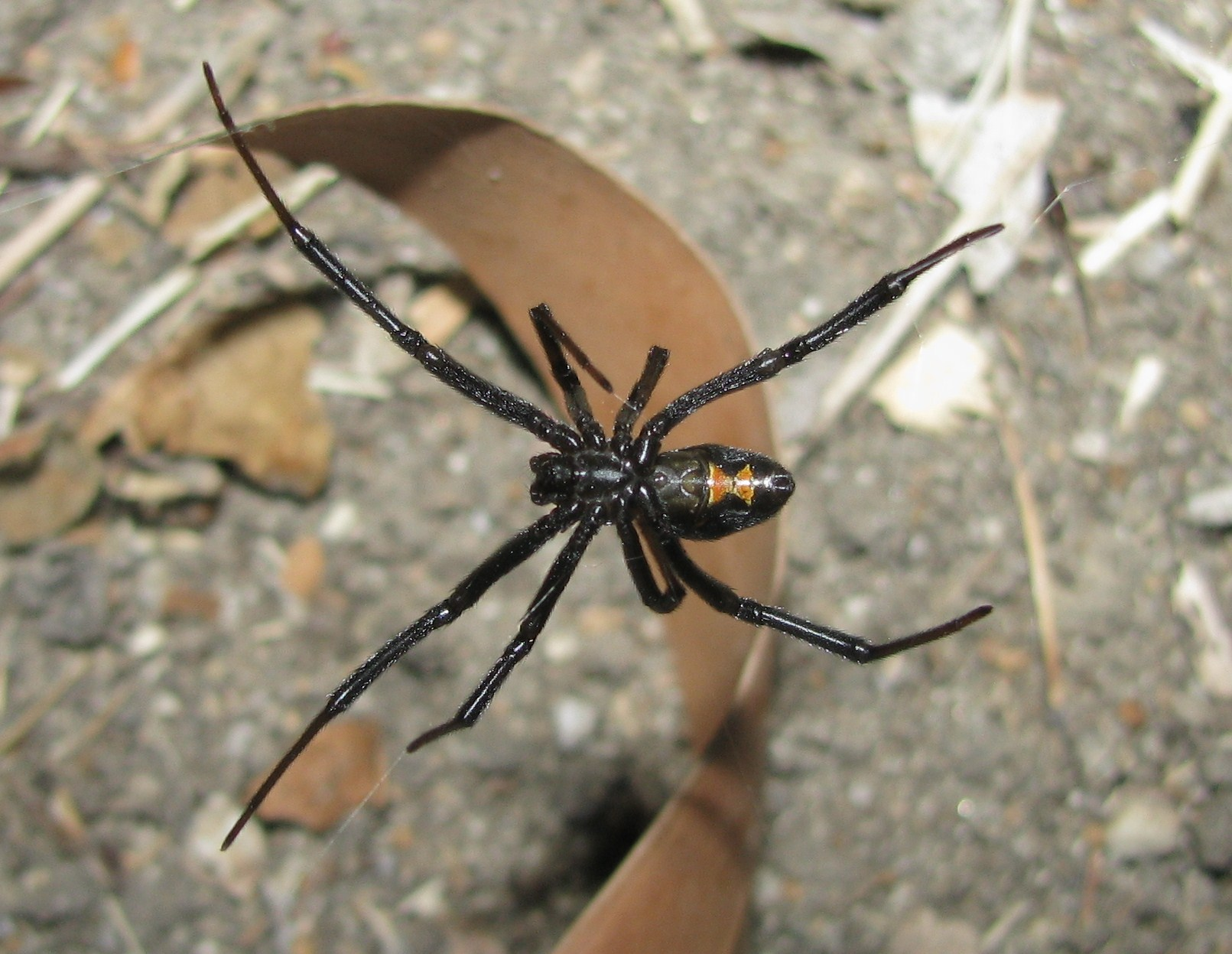
Female, ventral view

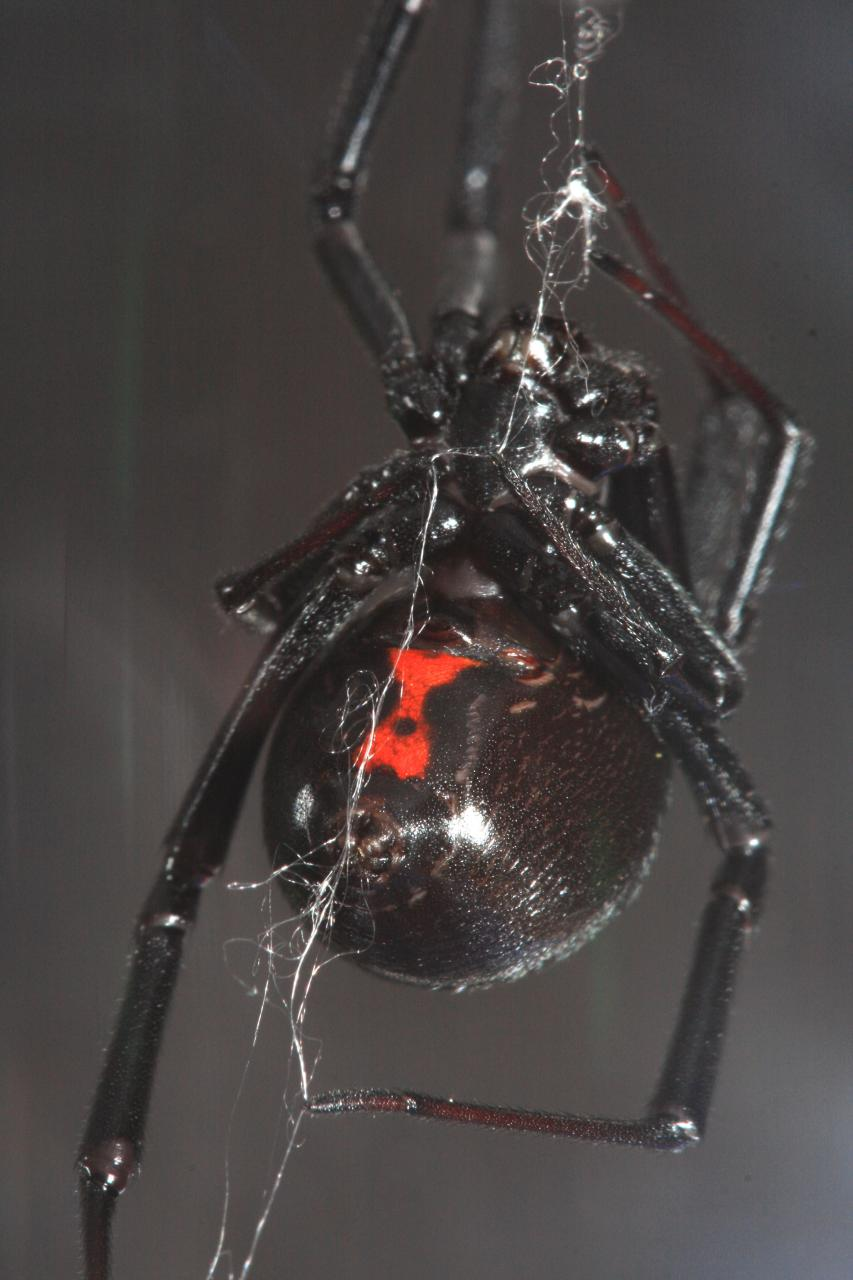
Typical female from California
