= Latrodectism =

Illness from a Latrodectus spider bite

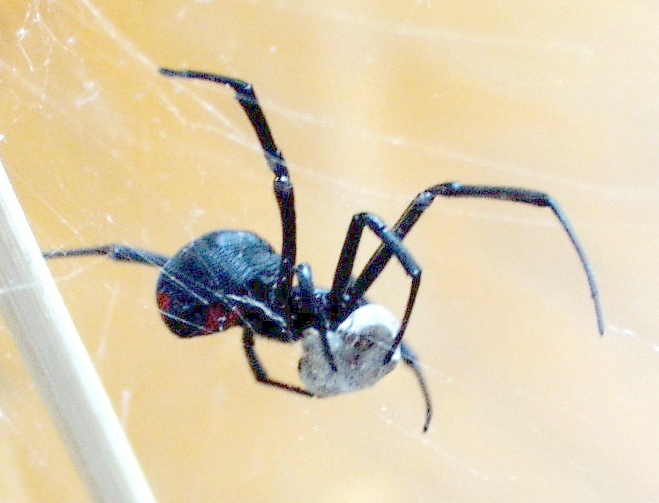
- The southern black widow spider (Latrodectus mactans), a cause of latrodectism.
- Specialty: Emergency medicine

Latrodectism (/lætrəˈdɛktɪzəm/) is the illness caused by the bite of Latrodectus spiders (the black widow spider and related species). Pain, muscle rigidity, vomiting, and sweating are the symptoms of latrodectism.

There are several spider species all named black widow: southern black widow spider (L. mactans), the European black widow (L. tredecimguttatus), Western black widow spider (L. hesperus), Northern black widow spider (L. variolus). Other Latrodectus that cause latrodectism are the Australian redback spider (L. hasselti), the New Zealand katipō spider (L. katipo) and the South American Latrodectus corallinus and Latrodectus curacaviensis. Several other members of the genus Latrodectus are not commonly associated with latrodectism, including the cosmopolitan brown widow (L. geometricus).

== Signs and symptoms ==
Symptoms of a bite depend on the amount of venom injected. A bite of Latrodectus may not inject any venom (known as a dry bite), and so no illness occurs. About 75% of "wet" bites will have localized pain and little more. If, however, there is a substantial dose, a bite can cause latrodectism. The main symptoms are generalized muscle pain, stomach cramps, nausea and vomiting. Initially, a pinprick or burning sensation can be felt when bitten by widow spiders. If there was enough venom injected, pain worsens over the next hour, and the area will develop localized sweating and goosebumps. The pain may spread and become generalized. The typical duration is three to six days. Rarely, some people who do not receive antivenom may have muscle weakness that lasts for weeks.

=== Classic course ===
- Intense local pain develops 5–10 minutes after the bite and is followed by sweating and piloerection (goosebumps) within an hour. Neither puncture marks nor redness are necessarily seen.
- A few people go on to have widespread symptoms. Pain typically starts at the bite site then travels up (e.g., from foot to thigh to trunk), followed by generalized pain (in back, trunk, chest, or shoulder). The venom directly affects nerves, leading to the unusual feature of severe sweating, which may be regional (e.g., one leg). Changes in adrenaline can lead to a mild increase in blood pressure and pulse.
- Non-specific features of latrodectism include headache, nausea, vomiting, and feeling ill and weak.
- Symptoms may wax and wane over the next one to four days. Rarely, patients may feel unwell for up to a week. Very rarely, untreated patients report ongoing bite site pain that lasts weeks or months.

=== Special circumstances ===
- During pregnancy, the pain and abdominal cramps may be confused with or even precipitate uterine contractions. A case of preterm labor initiated by a redback spider was relieved by antivenom.
- Early medical reports of latrodectism were described in men using outhouses; the genitals were often the site of the bite. No direct injury to site is reported.
- Myocarditis (inflammation of the heart muscle) has been associated with one medically reported death in the last 50 years.
- Rhabdomyolysis (rapid skeletal muscle tissue breakdown) is an uncommon complication.

== Pathophysiology ==
Spider venoms are a complex collection of toxic agents. Unique to the widows is latrotoxin. The venom acts on nerves causing the massive release of the neurotransmitters acetylcholine, norepinephrine, and GABA. The release of these neurotransmitters leads to pain, cramps, sweating, and fast pulse. Latrotoxin acts on presynaptic nerve membranes (See Chemical synapse) and through the cell's signalling protein (calcium-independent receptor of alpha-latrotoxin CIRL). Thus initial pain is often followed by severe muscle cramps. Contraction of musculature may extend throughout the body, though cramping in the abdomen is frequently the most severe. Latrotoxin may act on muscles directly preventing relaxation, promoting tetany—constant, strong, and painful muscle contractions.

== Diagnosis ==
There are no tests required to diagnose widow spider bites or latrodectism symptoms. The diagnosis is clinical and based on historic evidence of widow spider bites. Pathognomonic symptoms, such as localized sweating and piloerection, provide evidence of envenomation. Diagnosis in most people includes reporting contact with a Latrodectus spider. Overdiagnosis is a risk without a spider to identify. However, without a history of contact, the diagnosis may be missed, as symptoms overlap with a variety of other serious clinical syndromes such as tetanus or acute abdomen. Blood values are typically unimportant but may be needed to show myocarditis or dehydration from vomiting.

== Treatment ==
People who have been bitten by a black widow spider are recommended to seek professional medical assistance for symptoms. Symptoms self-resolve in hours to days in a majority of bites without medical intervention.

Medical treatments have varied over the years. Some treatments (e.g., calcium gluconate) have been discovered to be useless. Currently, treatment usually involves symptomatic therapy with pain medication, muscle relaxants, and antivenom. When the pain becomes unbearable, antivenom is administered. Antivenom historically completely resolves pain in a short time. Antivenom is made by injecting horses with latrodectus venom over a period of time. The horse develops antibodies against the venom, then the horse is bled and the antibodies purified for later use. Doctors recommend the use of anti-inflammatory medications before antivenom administration, because antivenom can induce allergic reactions to the horse proteins. The efficacy of antivenom has come under scrutiny, as patients receiving placebos have also recovered quickly. Antivenom is used widely in Australia for redback bites; however, in the United States it is less commonly used. Antivenom made from spider bite survivors has been used since the 1920s. Opioids such as morphine relieve pain, and benzodiazepines ease muscle spasm in most patients.

== Prognosis ==
The vast majority of victims fully recover without significant lasting problems. Death from latrodectism is rare and series of 11 and 60 patients had no deaths. In the United States, where antivenom is rarely used, there have been no deaths reported for decades.

Despite a frequent reference to youth and old age being predisposing factors, it has been demonstrated that young children appear to be at the lowest risk for a serious bite, perhaps owing to the rapid use of antivenom. Bite victims who are very young, old, hypotensive, pregnant, or who have existing heart problems are reported to be the most likely to develop complications.

== Epidemiology ==
Bites from Latrodectus occur usually because of accidental contact with the spiders. The species is not aggressive to humans naturally, but may bite when trapped. As such, bite incidents may be described as accidents. Reports of epidemics were associated with agricultural areas in Europe in the last two centuries. However, the European spider is associated with fields, and humans come in contact only during harvest. For example, in the 1950s, researchers believed that three bites happened each year, and with an epidemic up to 180 each year.

Conversely, redback and North American black widows live in proximity with people, and several hundred black widow bites are reported to Poison Control in the United States each year. Of the bites reported in the United States from 2001 to 2005, approximately 31% were treated in a health care facility, 0.5% had major complications, and none were fatal.

In Perth, Australia, for example, there were 156 bites in children from redback spiders over 20 years. Twice as many boys were bitten as girls, mostly toddlers. A third of the children developed latrodectism and there were no deaths.

== See also ==
- Loxoscelism
