= Latrotoxin =

Group of neurotoxins in spider venom

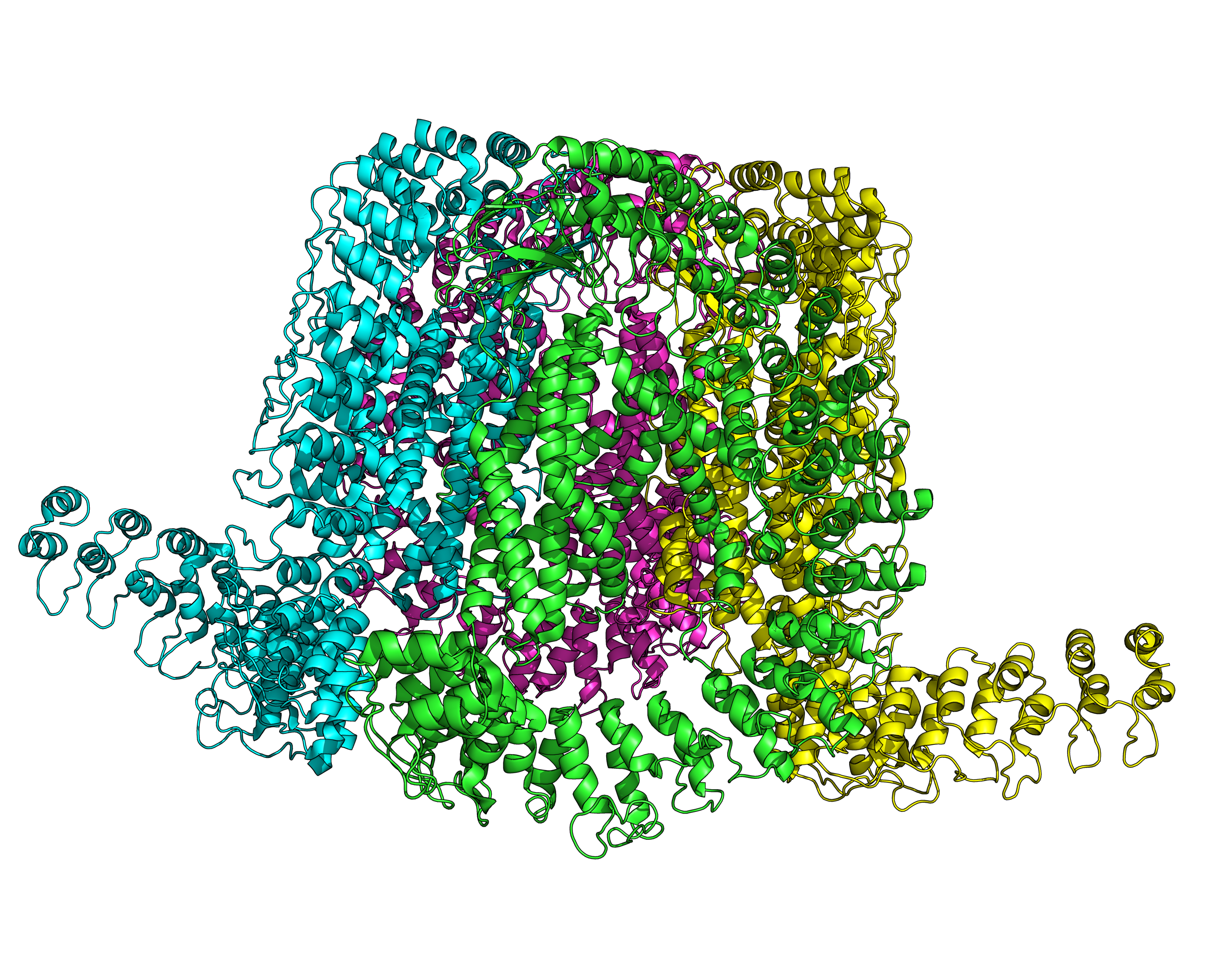
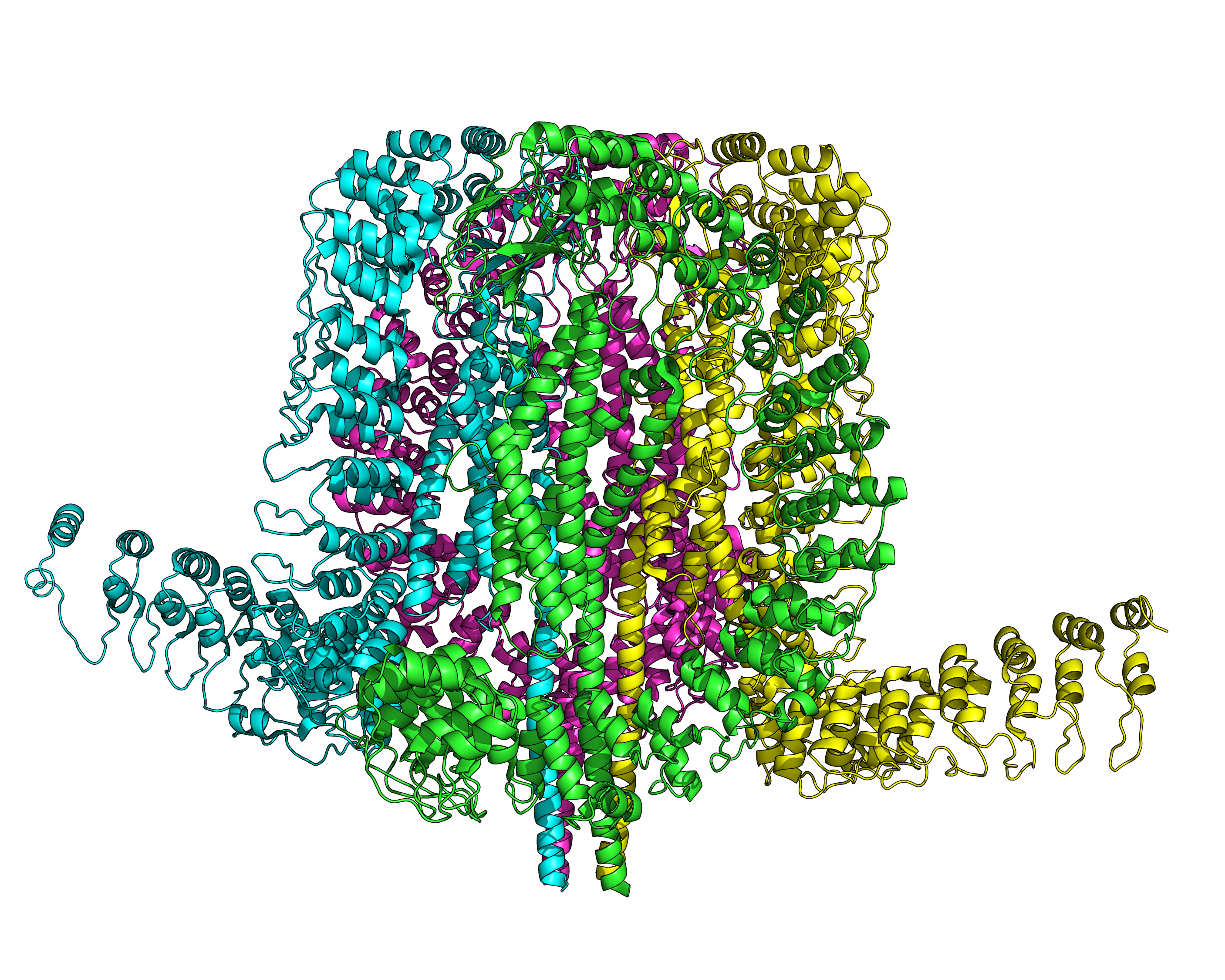
Prepore (top) and pore (bottom) structure of α-latrotoxin.

A latrotoxin is a high-molecular mass neurotoxin found in the venom of spiders of the genus Latrodectus (widow spiders) as well as at least one species of another genus in the same family, Steatoda nobilis. Latrotoxins are the main active components of the venom and are responsible for the symptoms of latrodectism.

The following latrotoxins have been described: five insecticidal toxins, termed α, β, γ, δ and ε-latroinsectotoxins, one vertebrate-specific neurotoxin, α-latrotoxin, and one toxin affecting crustaceans, α-latrocrustatoxin.

== α-latrotoxin ==
The best-studied latrotoxin is α-latrotoxin, which acts presynaptically to release neurotransmitters (including acetylcholine) from sensory and motor neurons, as well as on endocrine cells (to release insulin, for example). It is a ~130 kDa protein that exists mainly in its dimerized or tetramerized forms.

α-latrotoxin (α-LTX) can naturally be found in widow spiders of the genus Latrodectus. The most widely known of those spiders are the black widows, Latrodectus mactans. The venom of widow spiders (Latrodectus) contains several protein toxins, called latrotoxins, which selectively target either vertebrates, insects or crustaceans. One of these toxins is α-latrotoxin and targets selectively against vertebrates; it is ineffective in insects and crustaceans. α-LTX has a high affinity for receptors that are specific for neuronal and endocrine cells of vertebrates.

=== Biosynthesis ===
As the DNA sequence for α-LTX is transcribed and translated, an inactive precursor molecule of α-LTX (156.9 kDa) is formed. This precursor molecule undergoes post-translational processing where the eventual, active α-LTX protein (131.5 kDa) is formed.

The N-terminus of the α-LTX precursor molecule is preceded by short hydrophilic sequences ending with a cluster of basic amino acids. These clusters are recognized by proteolytic enzymes (furin-like proteases), which cleave and activate the α-LTX precursor molecules by means of hydrolysis. The C-terminus too is recognized by these furin-like proteases and is also cleaved.

α-LTX precursor molecules are synthesized by free ribosomes in the cytosol and are therefore cytosolic in the secretory epithelial cells of the venom glands., They can, however, associate with secretory granules although they are not taken up in the lumen of the granules. The cytosolic α-LTX precursor molecule is released from the cell by means of holocrine secretion where it ends up in the venom gland of the spider. This gland contains the several proteases involved in the cleavage of the precursor α-LTX molecule.

The α-LTX protein tertiary structure can be divided in three parts: the N-terminal wing (36 kDa), the body (76 kDa), and the C-terminal head (18.5 kDa). Because of C-terminal ankyrin repeats, which mediate protein-protein interactions, the α-LTX monomer forms a dimer with another α-LTX monomer under normal conditions. Tetramer formation activates toxicity.

=== Toxicokinetics ===
α-LTX affects motor nerve endings and endocrine cells. No major enzymatic activities are associated. Instead, the toxin can form pores in the lipid membranes and induce Ca^{2+} ion flow. The onset of effects by intoxication can occur with a lag-period of 1 to 10 minutes, even at subnanomolar concentration levels. At nanomolar concentrations, bursts of neurotransmitter release occur. After the bursts, prolonged periods of steady-state release take effect.

Stimulation of small end-plate action potentials are initially induced by the neurotoxin, while later on the neurotransmission is blocked at the neuromuscular junction. This is due to depletion of synaptic vesicle contents.

=== Toxicodynamics ===
α-LTX in its tetrameric form interacts with receptors (neurexins and latrophilins) on the neuronal membrane, which causes insertion of α-LTX into the membrane.

Once the tetramer is inserted into the cell membrane, two mechanisms of action can occur. First, insertion may lead to pore formation and possibly other effects, and second, the receptor may be activated, which leads to intracellular signaling. The four heads of the tetramer form a bowl surrounding the pore, which is restricted at one point to 10 Å. Millimolar concentrations of Ca^{2+} and Mg^{2+} strongly catalyze tetramer formation, suggesting that the tetrametric state is divalent cation-dependent, while EDTA favours formation of the dimer. Research also shows that concentrations of La^{3+} higher than 100 μM also block tetramerisation. Pore formation can occur in pure lipid membranes, but reconstituted receptors greatly increase pore formation. Biological membranes block pore formation when no α-LTX receptors are present (neurexin, latrophilin, PTPσ). It is also known that the three highly conserved cysteine residues are involved with α-LTX receptor binding, because mutants containing serine instead of cysteine residues did not induce toxicity. The N-terminal domain needs to fold properly, in which the disulfide bonds need to be functional. The α-LTX toxin is bound by a small protein, LMWP or latrodectin. It has been observed that pore formation in lipid bi-layers is impossible when latrodectin is unavailable. Lactrodectin has no effect on α-LTX toxicity.

==== Pore formation ====
The pores formed by α-LTX in the membrane are permeable to Ca^{2+} and therefore allow an influx of Ca^{2+} into the cell. This influx into an excitable cell stimulates exocytosis directly and efficiently. The cation influx is proportional to the amount of pores and hence the amount of involved receptors expressed on the cell membrane. Also Ca^{2+} strongly facilitates the forming of the tetramers and so its pore formation. The pore is also permeable to neurotransmitters, which causes massive leakage of the neurotransmitter pool in the cytosol.

Alongside the influx of Ca^{2+}, the channel is not very selective, allowing Na^{+}, K^{+}, Ba^{2+}, Sr^{2+}, Mg^{2+}, Li^{+} and Cs^{+} to pass the membrane too. The pore is open most of the time, with an open probability of 0.8. Most trivalent cations block channels at 50-100 μM, such as Yb^{3+}, Gd^{3+}, Y^{3+}, La^{3+} and Al^{3+}.

The pore is not only permeable for cations, but also for water. This causes nerve terminal swelling. Further membrane potential disturbances occur due to permeability of small molecules, such as neurotransmitters and ATP to pass through the α-LTX pore.

Membrane penetration

Although tetrameric pore formation of α-latrotoxin has been shown conclusively, some authors still dispute whether this is the main mode of action of α-latrotoxin. When inserted into the membrane α-latrotoxin has both extracellular and intracellular domains and the latter could interact directly with the intracellular neurotransmitter release machinery.

==== Receptors ====
The following mechanism is suggested for receptor-mediated effects. Three receptors for α-latrotoxin have been described:

- neurexin
- latrophilin (CIRL, calcium-independent receptor for latrophilin)
- protein tyrosine phosphatase sigma (PTPσ).

The toxin stimulates a receptor, most likely latrophilin, which is a G-protein coupled receptor linked to Gαq/11. The downstream effector of Gαq/11 is phospholipase C (PLC).When activated PLC increases the cytosolic concentration of IP3, which in turn induces release of Ca^{2+} from intracellular stores. This rise in cytosolic Ca^{2+} may increase the probability of release and the rate of spontaneous exocytosis. Latrophilin with α-LTX can induce the activation of Protein Kinase C (PKC). PKC is responsible for the phosphorylation of SNARE proteins. Thus latrophilin with α-LTX induces the effect of exocytosis of transport vesicles. The exact mechanism has to be discovered.

Signaling

As well as the major effects of α-latrotoxin pore formation, other effects of α-latrotoxin are mediated by interaction with latrophilin and intracellular signalling (see signal transduction).

=== Structure activity relationship (SAR) ===
The natural occurring α-LTX dimer has to form a tetramer to be toxic. Tetramerisation occurs only in the presence of bivalent cations (such as Ca^{2+} or Mg^{2+}) or amphipathic molecules. The four monomers that form this tetramer are symmetrically arranged around a central axis, resembling a four-blade propeller with a diameter of 250 Å and a thickness of 100 Å. The head domains form the compact, central mass brought together and surrounded by the body domains. The wings stand perpendicular towards the axis of the tetramer. Because of this form the tetramer contains a pear-shaped channel in the central mass. At the lower end the diameter of this channel is 25 Å, then widens to 36 Å to be constricted to 10 Å at the top.

The base of the tetramer (below the wings) is 45 Å deep and is hydrophobic, which mediates insertion into the cell membrane. Also insertion of the tetramer is only possible in presence of certain receptors (mainly neurexin Iα and latrophilin and PTPσ in a minor extent) on the membrane. Neurexin Iα only mediates insertion under presence of Ca^{2+}, whereas latrophilin and PTPσ can mediate insertion without presence of Ca^{2+}. So because of the channel and the insertion in the cell membrane the protein makes the cell more permeable to substances that can pass through the channel. These substances are mono- and bivalent cations, neurotransmitters, fluorescent dyes and ATP.

=== Toxicity ===
The median lethal dose (LD_{50}) of α-LTX in mice is 20–40 μg/kg of body weight.

The LD_{50} of Latrodectus venom in mg/kg for various species: frog = 145, blackbird = 5.9, canary = 4.7, cockroach = 2.7, chick = 2.1, mouse = 0.9, housefly = 0.6, pigeon = 0.4, guinea pig = 0.1.

=== Scientific contribution ===
αLTX has helped confirm the vesicular transport hypothesis of transmitter release, establish the requirement of Ca^{2+} for vesicular exocytosis, and characterize individual transmitter release sites in the central nervous system. It helped identify two families of important neuronal cell-surface receptors.

The mutant form of αLTX, which is called αLTXN4C and does not form pores, has contributed to research. It helped the approach to deciphering the intracellular signaling transduction mechanism stimulated by αLTX. The mutant toxin can also be used to study the nature and properties of intracellular Ca^{2+} stores implicated in the toxin receptor transduction pathway and their effect on evoked postsynaptic potentials. The mutant toxin can also be an instrument to elucidate the endogenous functions of αLTX.

== Other venom components ==
The natural prey of widow spiders are insects, and several insectotoxins are found in its venom. The latroinsectotoxins appear to have similar structures.

High-molecular-weight proteins that have been isolated from the Mediterranean black widow (L. tredecimguttatus) include the insect-specific neurotoxins α-latroinsectotoxin and δ-latroinsectotoxin, a neurotoxin affecting crustaceans known as latrocrustatoxin, and small peptides that inhibit angiotensin-1-converting enzyme.

Apart from the high molecular weight latrotoxins described above, Latrodectus venom also contains low molecular weight proteins whose function has not been explored fully yet, but may be involved in facilitating membrane insertion of latrotoxins.
