= Allan Blair =

Canadian university professor (1900–1948)

Allan Walker Blair (1900–1948) was a professor at the University of Alabama's medical school who is best known for allowing himself to be bitten by a black widow spider in order to investigate the toxicity of its venom in humans. As a result of the experiment he was hospitalized for two days, but later made a full recovery. The test was an attempt to convince skeptics who thought that the black widow's venom might not be dangerous to humans.

He ultimately developed a treatment protocol for black widow spider bites.

== Early life and career ==
An Encyclopedia of Saskatchewan article notes that Allan Walker Blair was born in Brussels, Ontario. His family moved to Regina when he was 11. He earned a BA from the University of Saskatchewan and an MD CM degree from McGill University in Montreal, Canada, in 1928.

After teaching pathology at the University of Alabama [1929-34], he studied surgery at the Winnipeg General Hospital in Manitoba, Canada [1934-35].

Blair was the first Canadian awarded a Rockefeller Fellowship to study cancer at New York Memorial Hospital, in 1935–36.

The Allan Blair Cancer Centre in Regina, Saskatchewan, Canada is named in honor of him.

== Envenomation experiment ==
In 1933, many disagreed as to whether a black widow spider bite actually caused the symptoms reported. Until then, only a few similar tests had been completed and they lacked scientific validity for various reasons.

On November 12, 1933 Blair allowed himself to be bitten by a female black widow spider to observe the effects of the spider's venom upon a human male. Blair chronicled the bite's effects on his body for two hours, until he could write no more and his assistants took over recording observations for the remaining two days. Approximately two hours after the bite, Allan was driven to a nearby hospital where the physicians who attended to him praised him for his courage but also for his persistence and skill in carrying on his investigation so long to such a successful conclusion. Blair also developed a protocol for treatment of patients bitten by a black widow spider.

Blair conducted the experiment, "with a view to providing an opportunity for complete scientific observation."

Blair initially hoped to determine whether being bitten provided victims with any protection from the effects of a second bite. However, the first bite proved so painful he chose not to place himself in the same position again. The physician in attendance was quoted as having never before witnessed "more abject pain manifested in any other medical or surgical condition."
