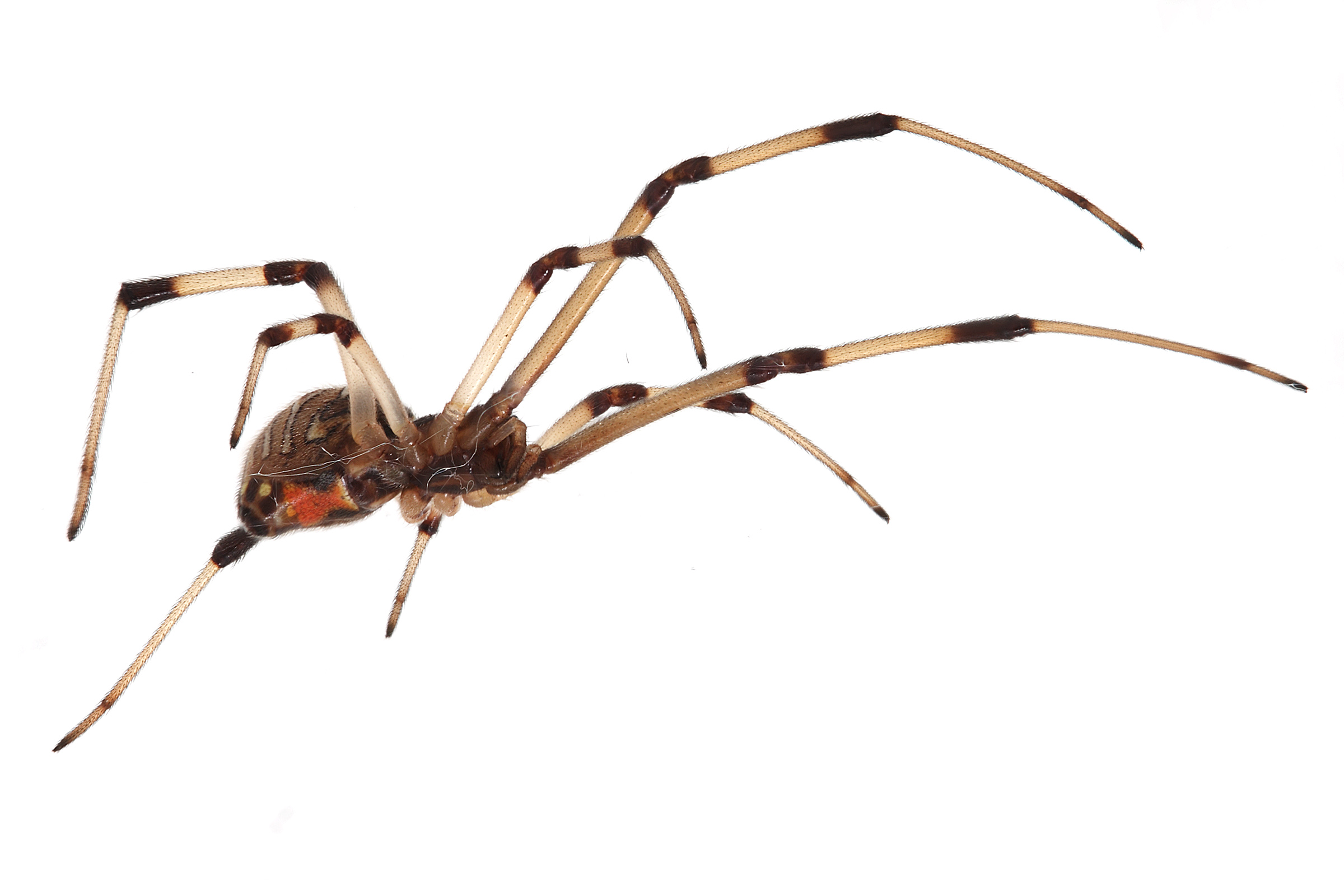

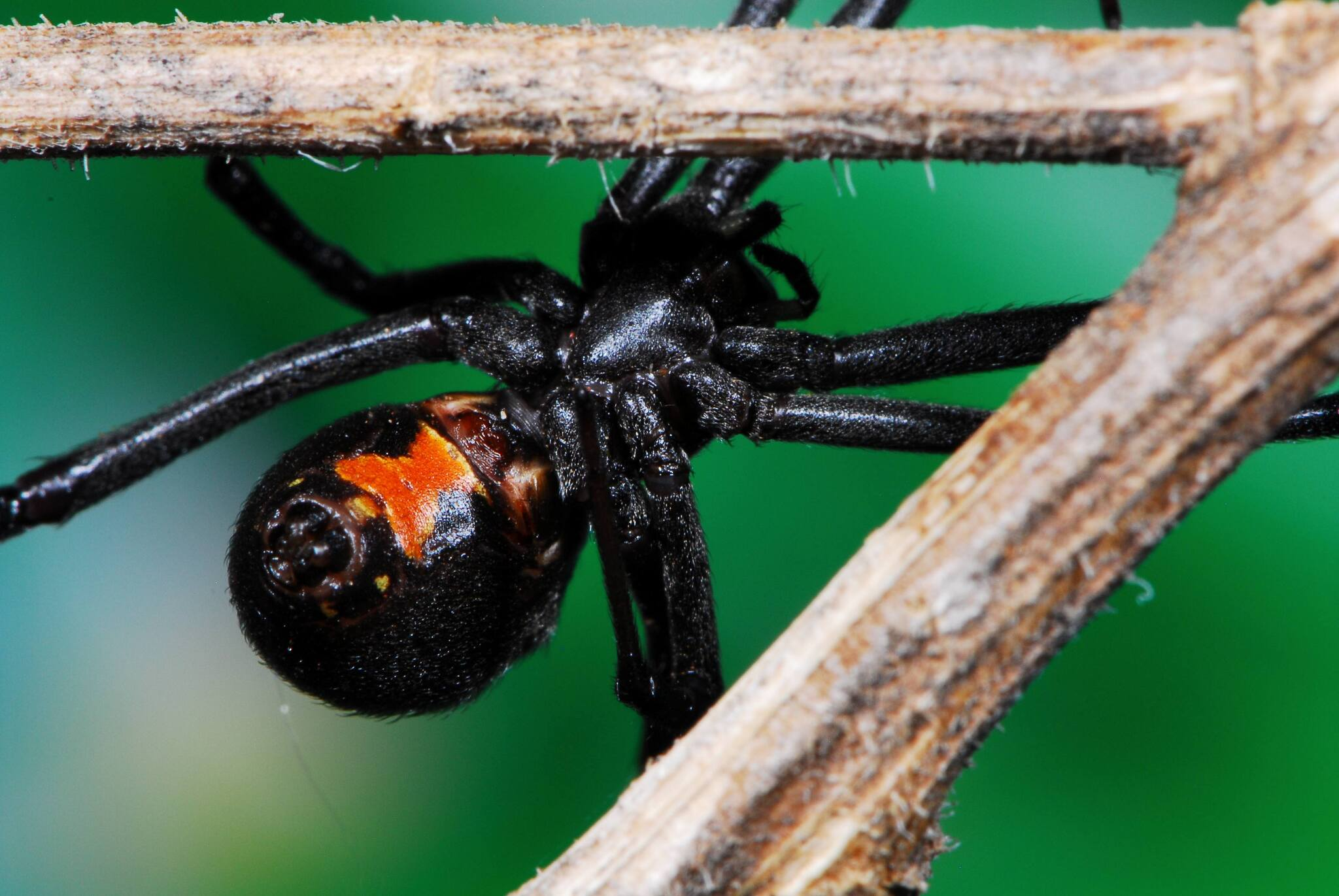
- Female from South Africa

Scientific classification
- Kingdom: Animalia
- Phylum: Arthropoda
- Subphylum: Chelicerata
- Class: Arachnida
- Order: Araneae
- Infraorder: Araneomorphae
- Family: Theridiidae
- Genus: Latrodectus
- Species: L. geometricus

Binomial name
- Latrodectus geometricus Koch, 1841

Synonyms
- Theridium zickzack Karsch, 1878; Theridion zickzack O. Pickard-Cambridge, 1904; Latrodectus concinnus O. Pickard-Cambridge, 1904; Chacoca distincta Badcock, 1932; Latrodectus distinctus Levy & Amitai, 1983; Latrodectus geometoricus Yoshida, 2003

= Latrodectus geometricus =

Species of spider

Latrodectus geometricus, commonly known as the brown widow, brown button spider, grey widow, brown black widow, house button spider or geometric button spider, is one of the widow spiders in the genus Latrodectus. As such, it is a 'cousin' to the more infamous Latrodectus mactans (black widow).

L. geometricus has black and white patterns on the sides of its abdomen as well as an orange-yellow colored hourglass shape marking. Their eggs are easily identified by points that project from all over the egg sacs. L. geometricus are found all over the world, but are believed to originate in Africa or South America. Their bites, though painful, are not considered to be dangerous.

== Habitat and ecology ==
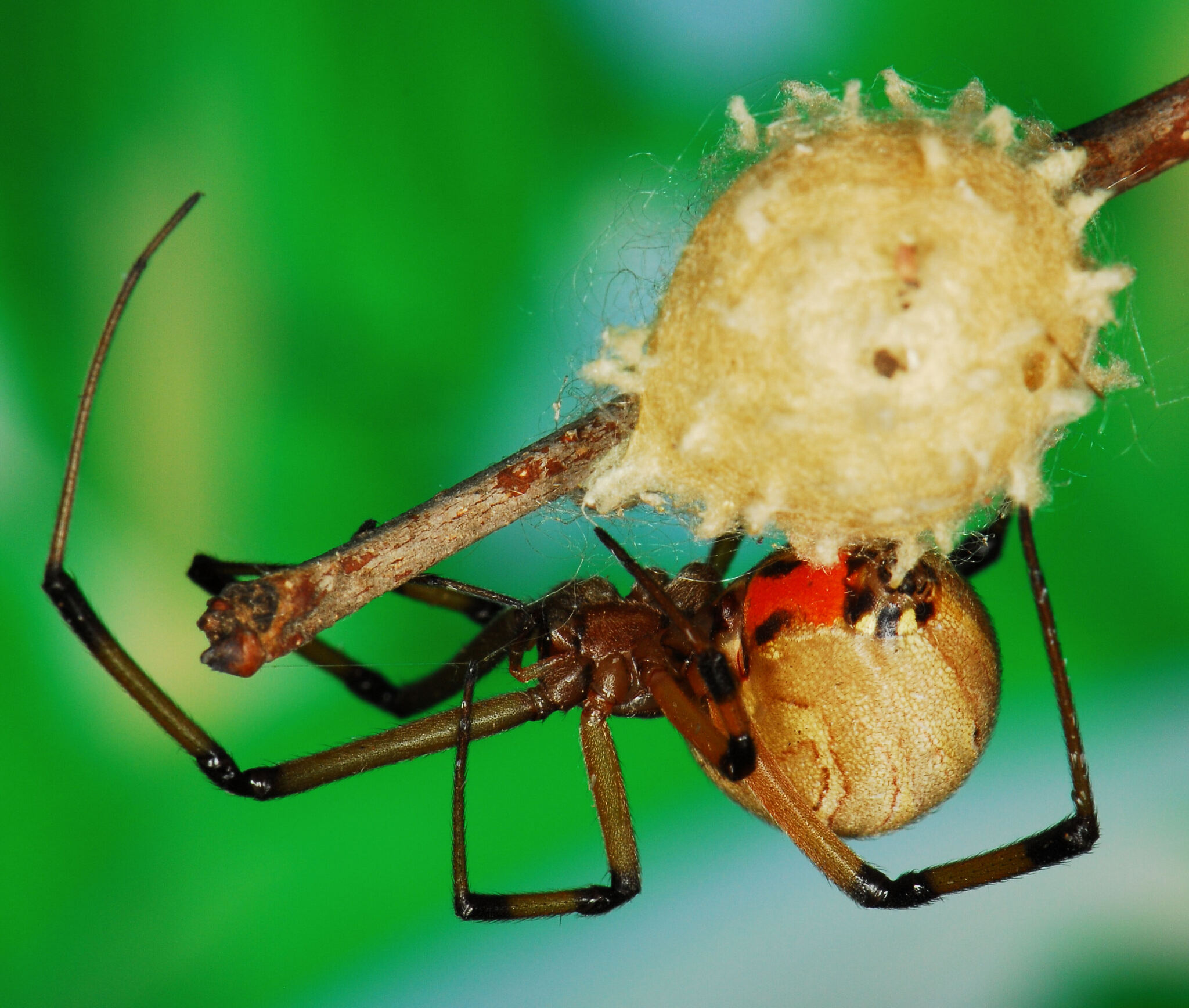
female with egg sac

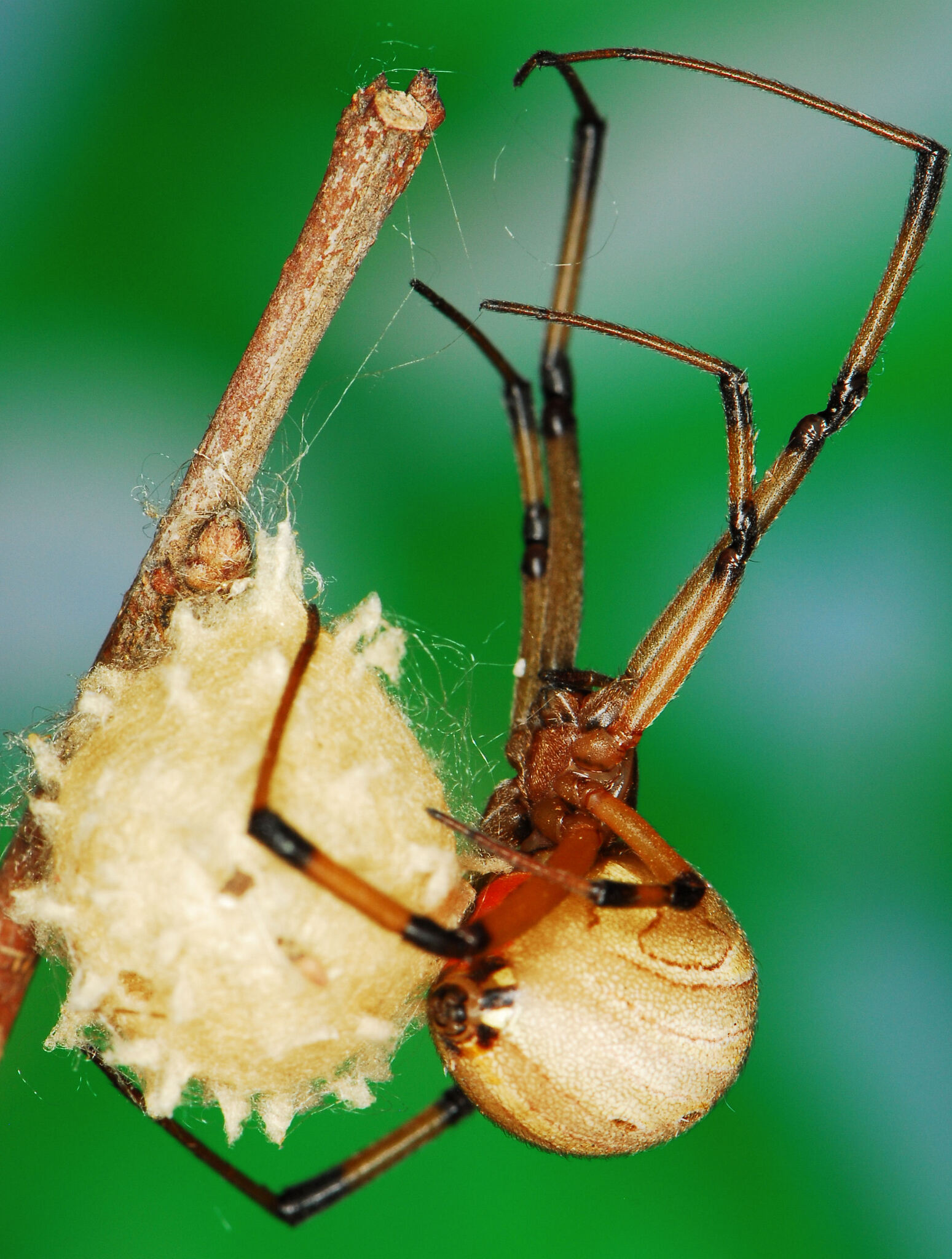

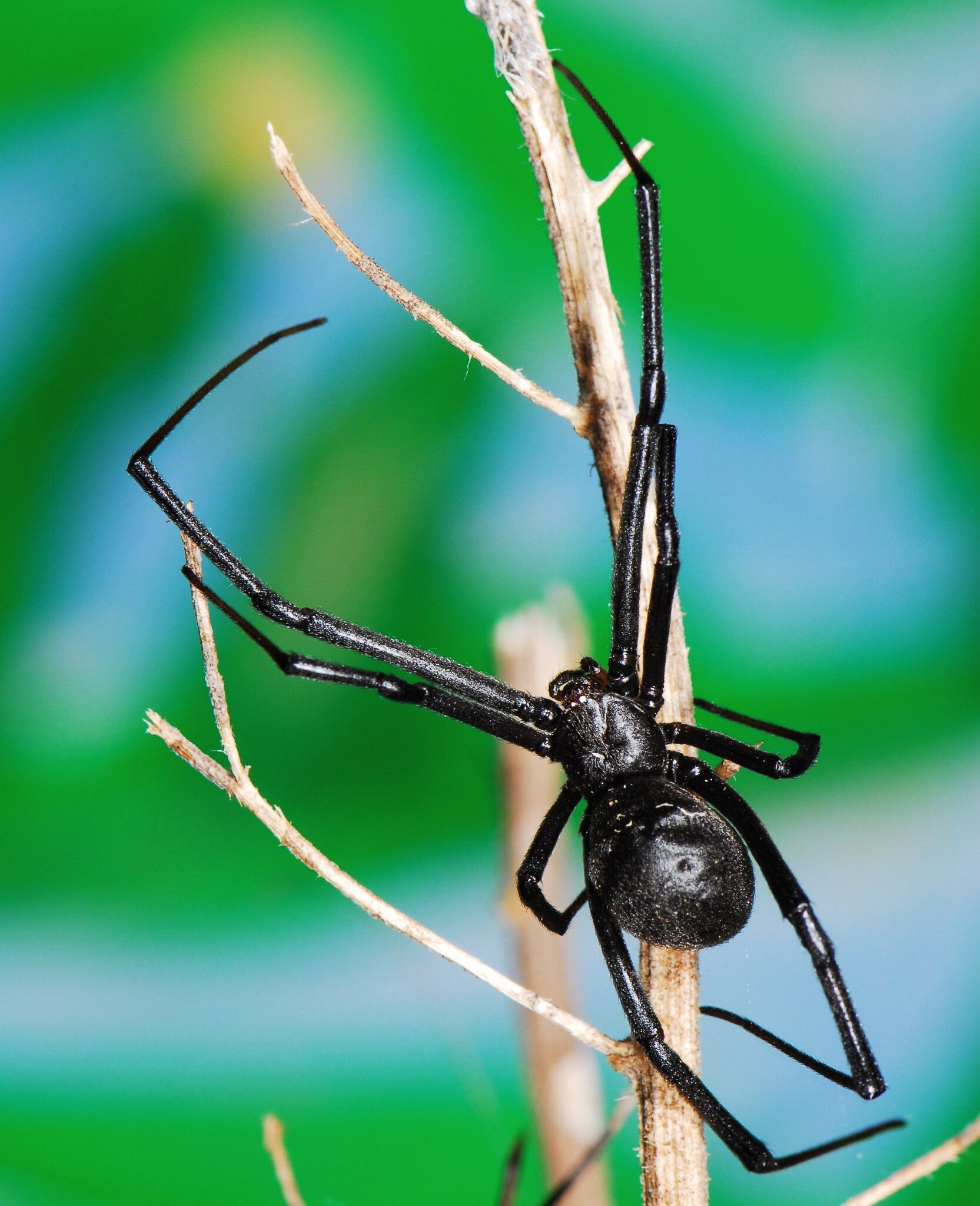
dark female

This species constructs three-dimensional webs in dark corners in a variety of microhabitats and is commonly found around houses. The egg sac is distinctive with spikes.

L. geometricus builds webs with a retreat from which delaying retreats radiate. From the delaying threads to the ground, sticky threads are laid down. The retreat has either one or two openings, with the main one opening onto the delaying threads. Webs are built at varying heights above the ground in vegetation and around buildings.

In South Africa, Latrodectus geometricus inhabits a large range at altitudes from 0 to 1941 m above sea level. It has been sampled from all floral biomes in South Africa and is commonly found in crops including avocado, citrus, cotton, maize, pistachio, prickly pears, and vineyards.

== Geographic distribution ==
The brown widow has a cosmopolitan distribution. The World Spider Catalog gives its native distribution as Africa, with introductions to the Americas, Poland, the Middle East, Pakistan, India, Thailand, Japan, China, Papua New Guinea, Australia and Hawaii. It is thought by some researchers to originate in South Africa, although this is uncertain, as specimens were discovered in both Africa and South America. They are usually found around buildings in tropical areas. They can compete with populations of the black widow spider. It is found in many areas of South Africa, the United States (including Hawaii), Australia, Japan, the Dominican Republic, Costa Rica, and Cyprus.

=== Threat to native species ===
As of 2012, researchers at the University of California, Riverside, suggested that the brown widow spider, newly established in Southern California, may in fact be displacing black widow spiders from the region, competing and/or fighting for territory. While certainly not definitive, this evidence does suggest that the brown widow is likely to be more hostile and aggressive towards its relative, the black widow, than the black widow is towards it. If that proves to be true, humans may be positively affected since brown widow bites are less toxic than those of black widows, thus posing less of a threat as they displace black widows over time.

== Description ==
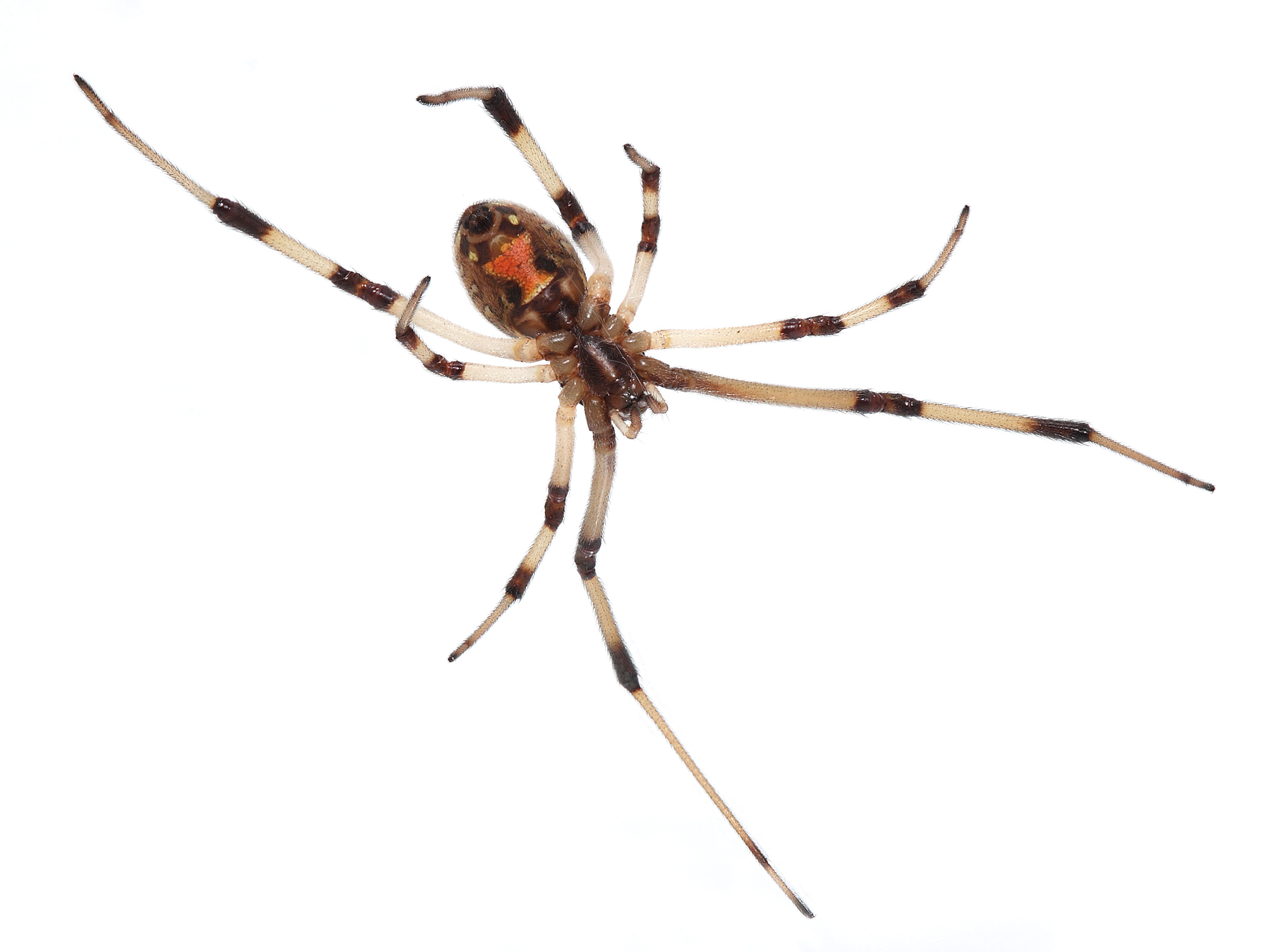
Orange hourglass marking

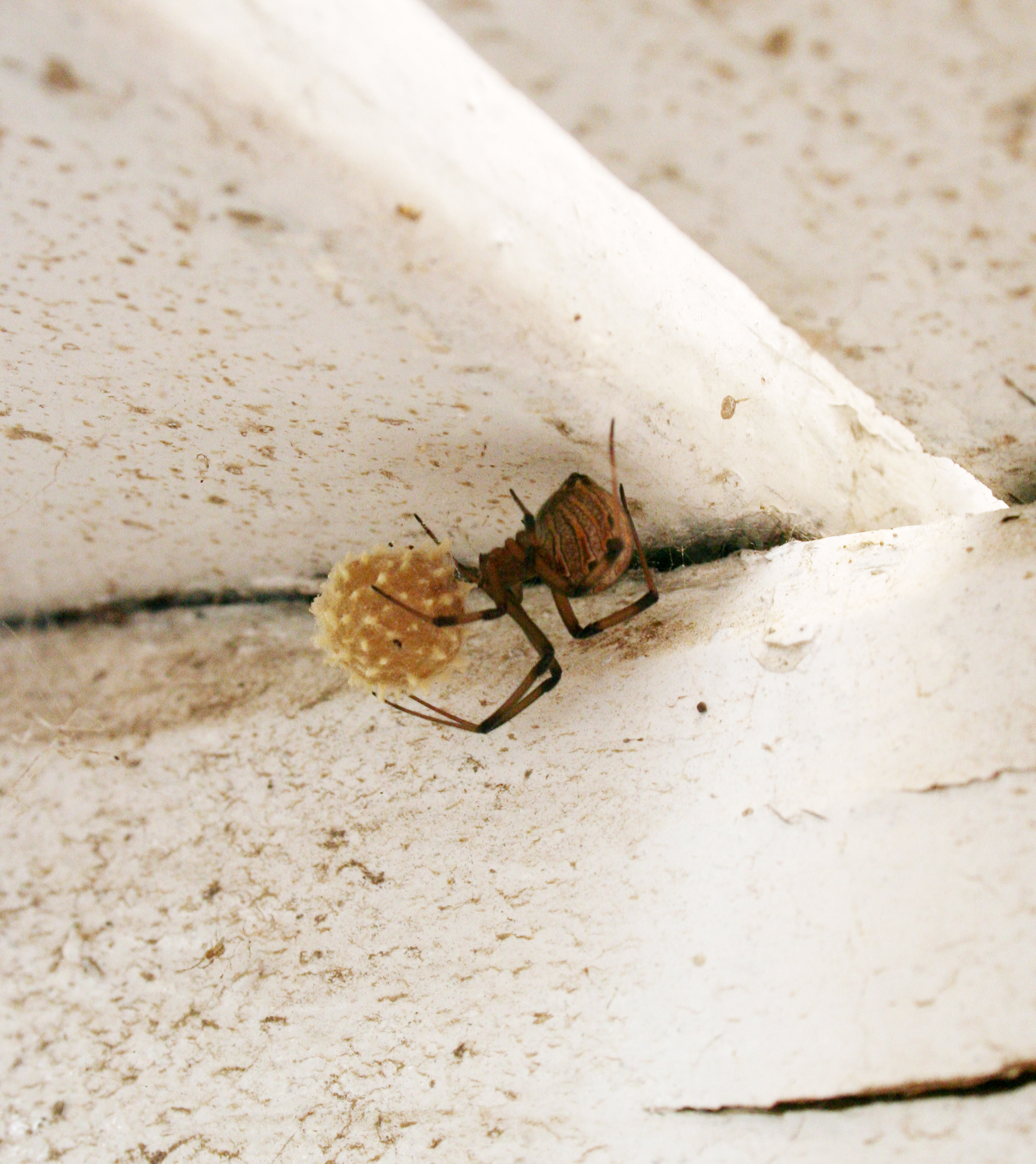
egg sac

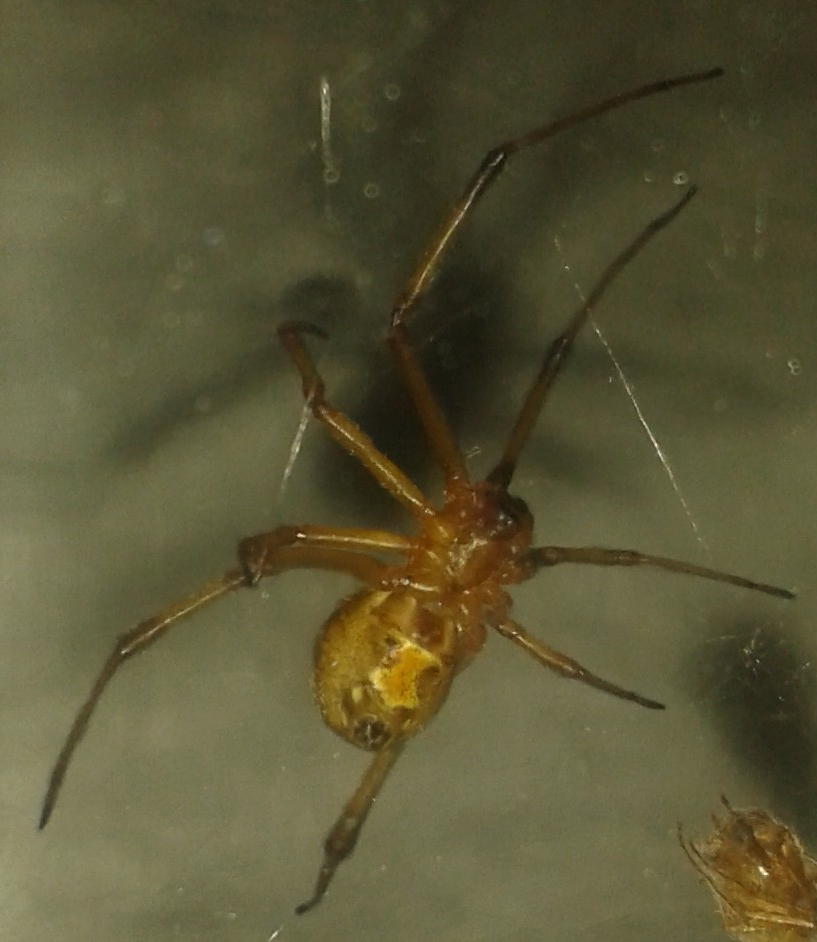
Cairo, Egypt

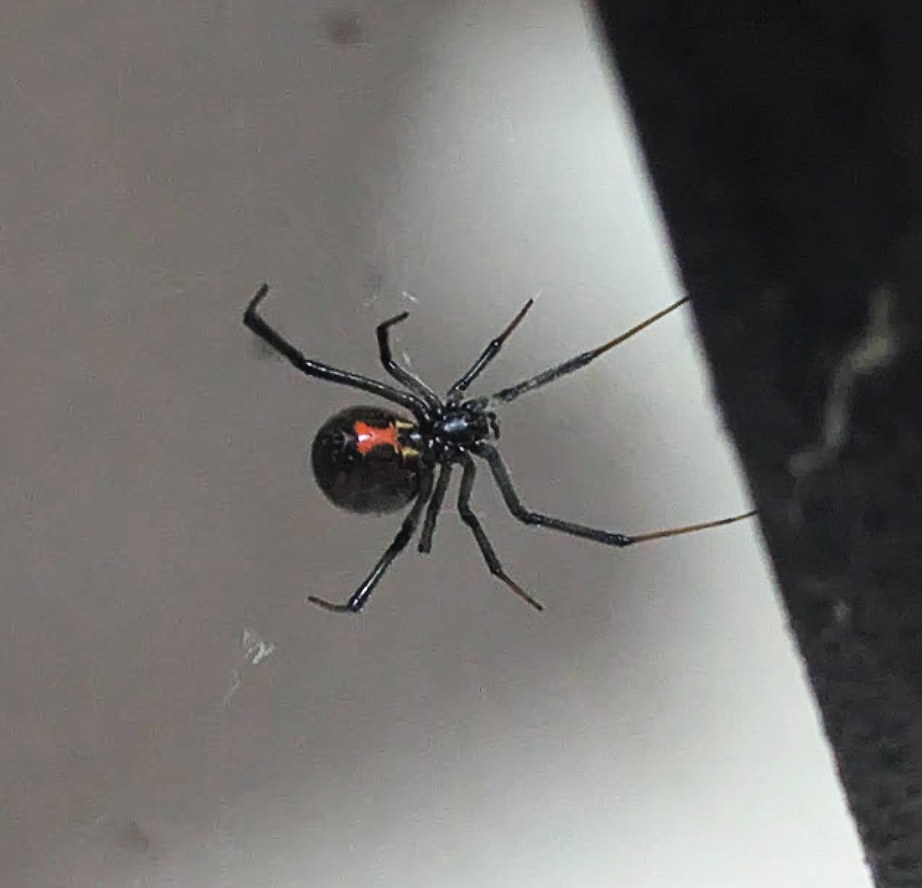
dark color variation Costa Rica

L. geometricus is slightly smaller and generally lighter in color than the black widow species; the color can range from tan to dark brown to black, with shades of grey also possible. Like the black widow species in the United States, L. geometricus has a prominent hourglass-shaped marking on the underside of the abdomen; the brown widow's hourglass, however, is usually a vivid orange or a yellowish color. Unlike the black widow, L. geometricus has a black-and-white geometric pattern on the dorsal side of its abdomen. They also have stripes on their legs.

Brown widows can be located by finding their egg sacs, which are easily identifiable. They resemble a sandspur, having pointed projections all over, and they are sometimes described as "tufted", "fluffy", or "spiky" in appearance. Eggs hatch in approximately 20 days. Female brown widows lay about 120–150 eggs per sac and can make 20 egg sacs over a lifetime.

== Taxonomy ==
L. geometricus derives its name from the geometric patterning on its abdomen. However, the spider's coloring can and does darken over time and the pattern may become obscured.

Similar widows include the L. rhodesiensis, a brown-colored relative of L. geometricus which is native to Zimbabwe. Both species are collectively known as brown button spiders throughout southern Africa.

== Predators ==
Because L. geometricus is dispersed all around the globe, they have many predators. Brown widows are commonly preyed upon by different types of wasps, including blue mud-dauber wasps and digger wasps.

== Toxicology ==
Like all Latrodectus species, L. geometricus has a neurotoxic venom. The venom acts on nerve endings causing the very unpleasant symptoms of latrodectism. However, brown widow bites are usually not very dangerous; usually much less dangerous than those of L. mactans, the black widow. The effects of the toxin are usually confined to the bite area and surrounding tissue, unlike the black widow's. Mere toxicity of the venom is not the only factor in dangerousness. Brown widow bites are minor compared to black widow bites because they cannot deliver the same amount of venom as the black widow. The LD_{50} of L. geometricus venom has been measured in mice as 0.43 mg/kg,

== Conservation ==
Latrodectus geometricus is listed as Least Concern by the South African National Biodiversity Institute due to its wide geographical range. The species is well protected in more than ten reserves and parks.

== Taxonomy ==
The genus was revised by Lotz in 1994.
