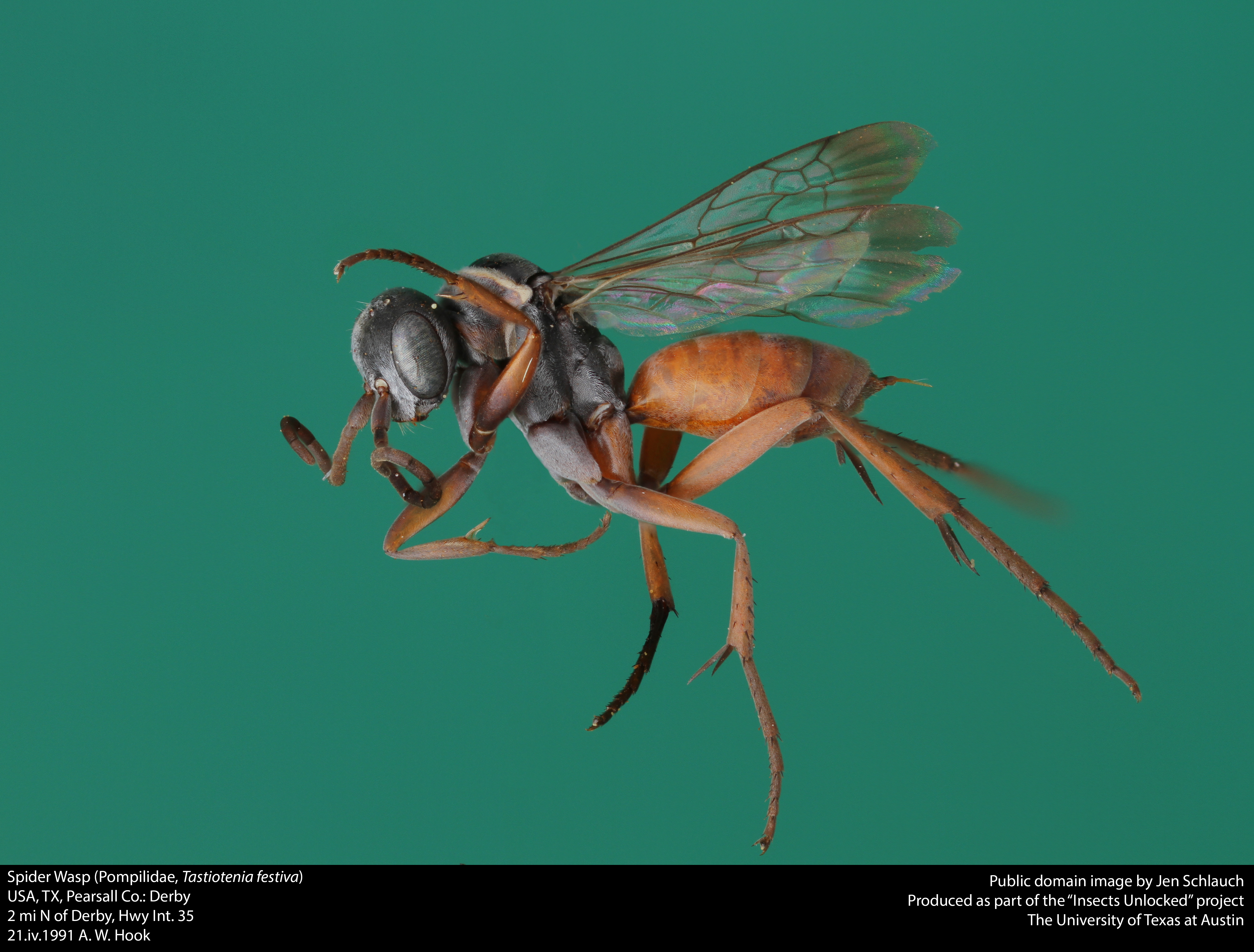

Scientific classification
- Domain: Eukaryota
- Kingdom: Animalia
- Phylum: Arthropoda
- Class: Insecta
- Order: Hymenoptera
- Family: Pompilidae
- Genus: Tastiotenia
- Species: T. festiva

Binomial name
- Tastiotenia festiva Evans, 1950

= Tastiotenia festiva =

Species of wasp

Tastiotenia festiva is a species of spider wasp in the subfamily Pompilinae. It was first described by its discoverer, Howard Ensign Evans, in 1950. It is a rather small spider wasp species, growing from 3–6.5 mm in length and has only been observed rarely. It lives in the desert regions of the south-western United States (southern California to western Texas) as well as northern Mexico (Sonora and Baja California). Based on Evans' biological observation in 1961, it is assumed that Tastiotenia festiva consumes black widow spiders as part of its diet and that it utilizes burrows made by other wasps for nesting.
