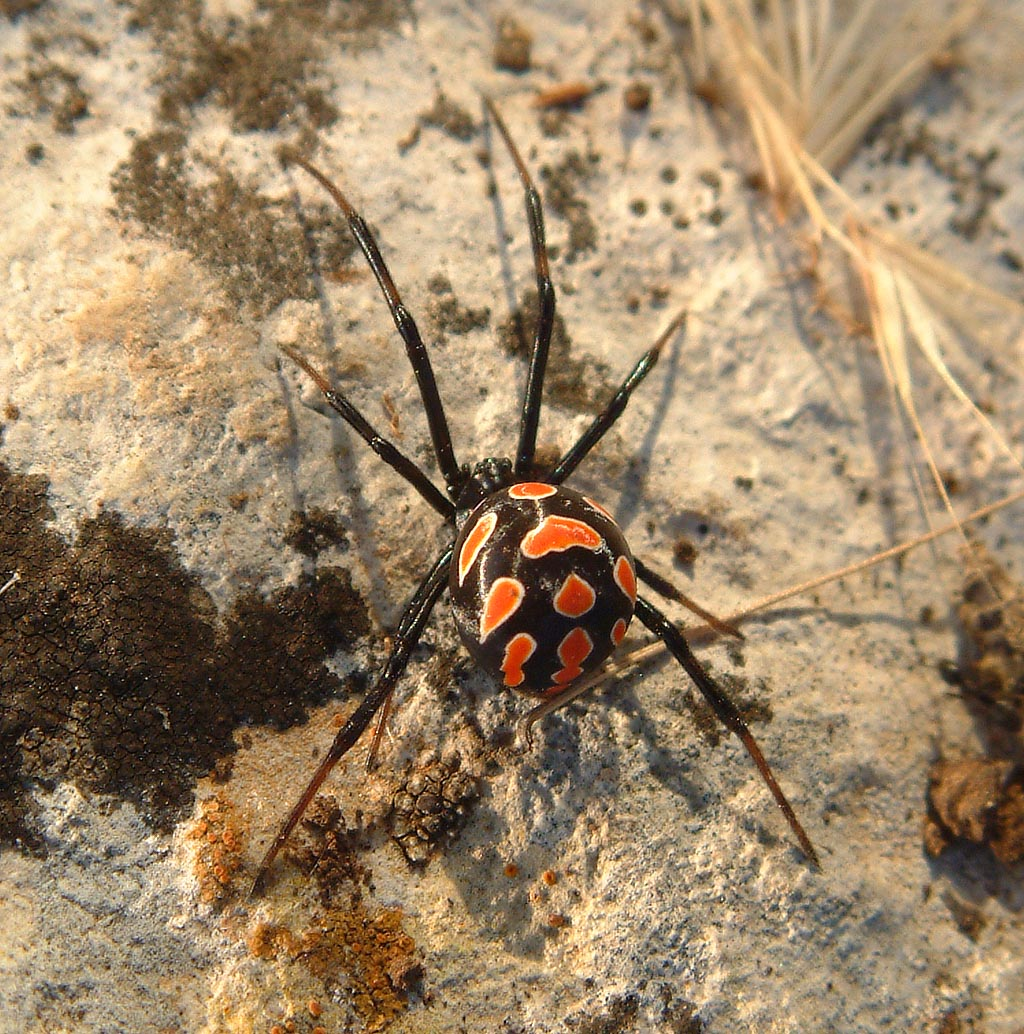
- Female L. tredecimguttatus, swollen with eggs

Scientific classification
- Kingdom: Animalia
- Phylum: Arthropoda
- Subphylum: Chelicerata
- Class: Arachnida
- Order: Araneae
- Infraorder: Araneomorphae
- Family: Theridiidae
- Genus: Latrodectus
- Species: L. tredecimguttatus

Binomial name
- Latrodectus tredecimguttatus (Rossi, 1790)
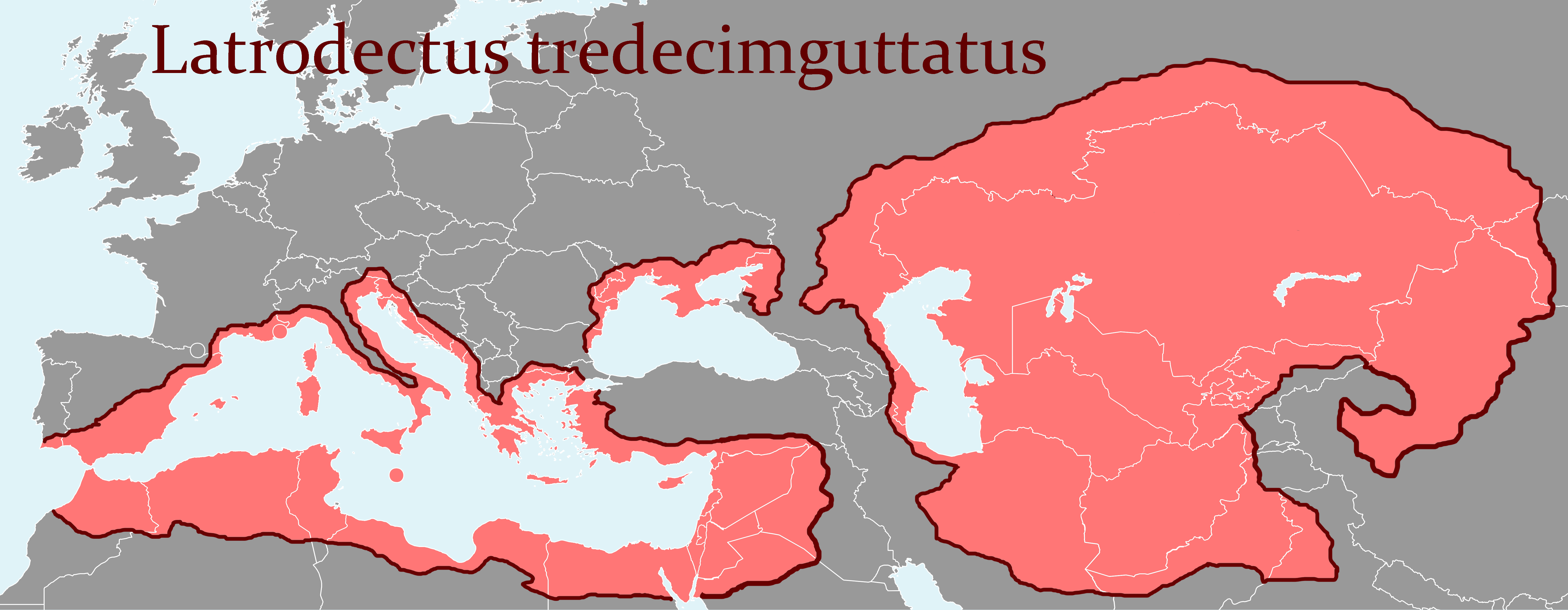
- Range of L. tredecimguttatus

Synonyms
- Aranea tredecimguttatus Rossi, 1790

= Latrodectus tredecimguttatus =

Species of spider

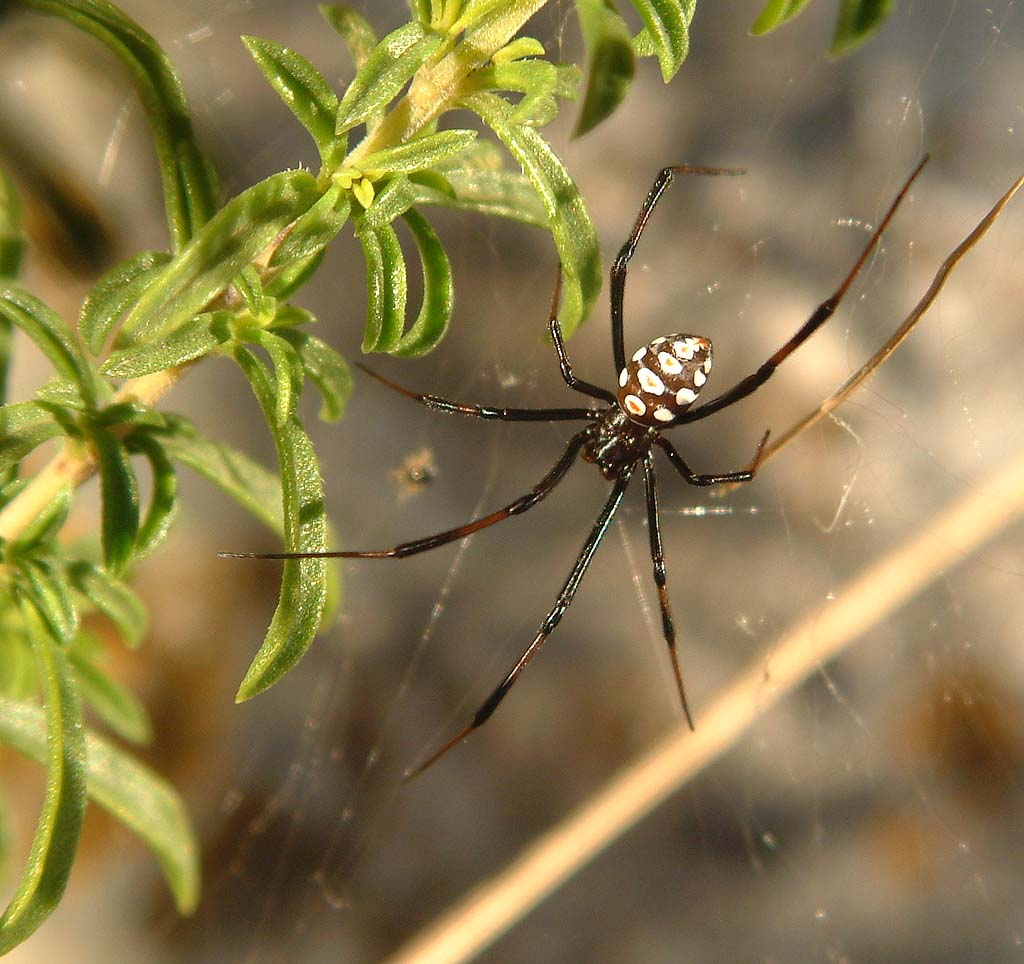
Male L. tredecimguttatus

Latrodectus tredecimguttatus, also known as the Mediterranean black widow or the European black widow, is a species in the genus Latrodectus of the widow spiders. It is commonly found throughout the Mediterranean region and central Asia, hence the name. Specimens from central Asia are also known by the binomial name Latrodectus lugubris; that name, however, is now considered improper, though it is still commonly found in the literature. Latrodectus tredecimguttatus was previously considered a subspecies of Latrodectus mactans.

== Description ==
L. tredecimguttatus is black in color, similar to most other widow species, and is identified by the thirteen spots which are found on its dorsal abdomen (the species name is Latin for "with thirteen spots"). These spots are usually red in colour, but may also be yellow or orange. It is otherwise similar to other species in the genus Latrodectus. The Mediterranean widow primarily lives in steppes and other grasslands, and can be a significant problem in areas where grain is harvested by hand. The female of the species has a body length of about 7–15 mm (0.28–0.59 in), while the male is smaller and reaches 4–7 mm (0.16–0.28 in) at best. Only the female spider's bite is dangerous (either for humans or cattle) as the male cannot penetrate the relatively thick epidermis.

== Toxicity ==
Like all Latrodectus species, L. tredecimguttatus has a painful bite that is fatal in rare cases. They are not in close association with humans generally, although epidemics of bites have been reported. There are many reports of Ukrainian farm workers receiving bites while working in the fields. The LD-50 of L. tredecimguttatus venom has been measured as 0.59 mg/kg, and separately again as 0.59 mg/kg (with a confidence interval of 0.33–1.06).

In Kazakhstan – where it has the common name karakurt (literally "black bug"; from the Turkic kara (black) and kurt (wolf)) – there are reports of this species biting and killing camels. The Turkic name karakurt also occurs in Russian (каракурт), Belarusian (каракурт) and Ukrainian (каракурт), as well as in Polish. Pioneering entomologist Jean Henri Fabre (1823-1915) wrote of the spider's fearsome reputation in Corsica, where it is known as the malmignatte:

I have seen her settle in the furrows, lay out her web and rush boldly at insects larger than herself; I have admired her garb of black velvet speckled with carmine-red; above all, I have heard most disquieting stories told about her. Around Ajaccio and Bonifacio, her bite is reputed very dangerous, sometimes mortal. The countryman declares this for a fact and the doctor does not always dare deny it.

One crustacean-specific and two insect-specific neurotoxins have been recovered from L. tredecimguttatus, as have small peptides that inhibit angiotensin-1-converting enzyme.
