= List of Gradungulidae species =

This page lists all described species of the spider family Gradungulidae accepted by the World Spider Catalog as of January 2021:

== Gradungula ==
Gradungula

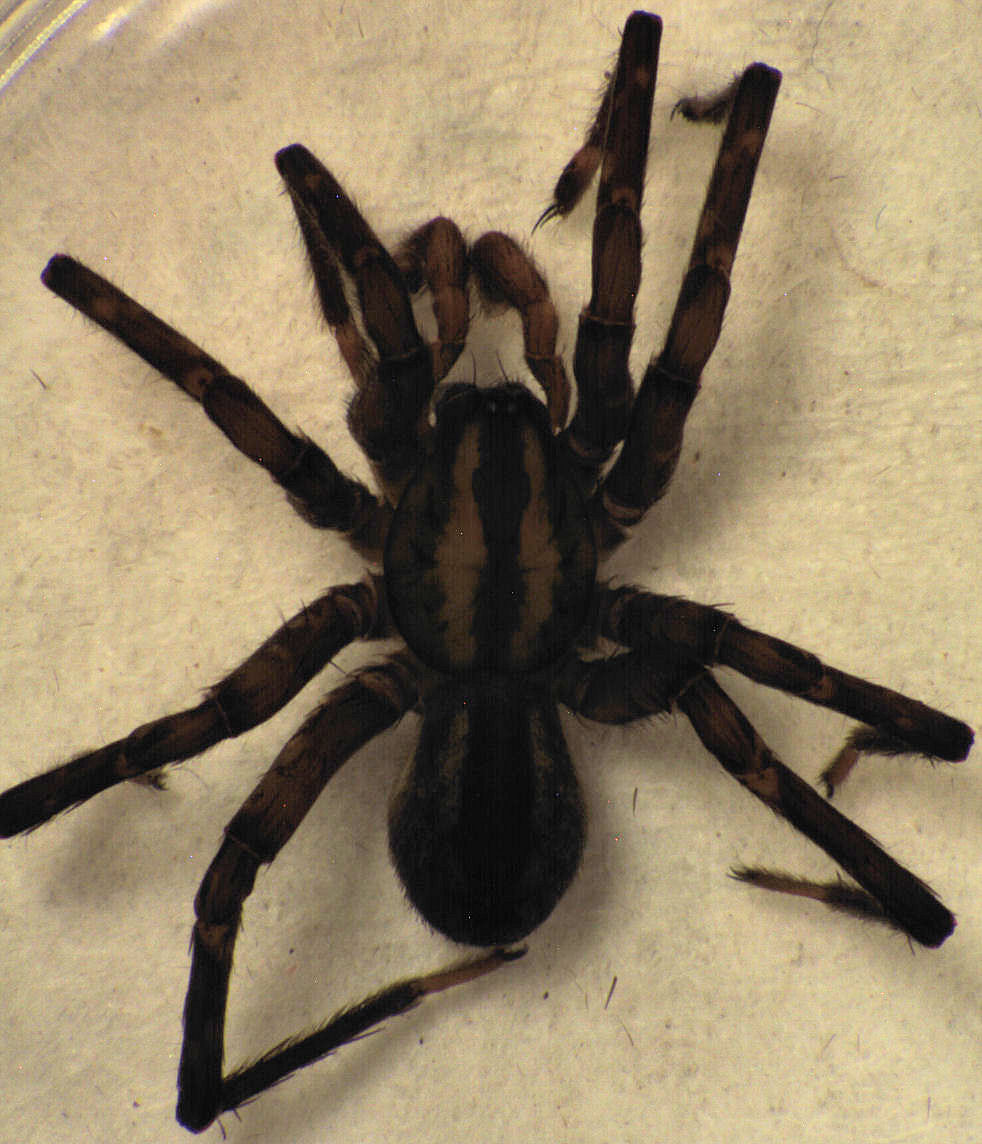
Gradungula sorenseni

Gradungula Forster, 1955

- G. sorenseni Forster, 1955 (type) — New Zealand

== Kaiya ==
Kaiya Gray, 1987

- K. bemboka Gray, 1987 — Australia (New South Wales)
- K. brindabella (Moran, 1985) — Australian Capital Territory
- K. parnabyi Gray, 1987 — Australia (Victoria)
- K. terama Gray, 1987 (type) — Australia (New South Wales)

== Macrogradungula ==
Macrogradungula Gray, 1987

- M. moonya Gray, 1987 (type) — Australia (Queensland)

== Pianoa ==
Pianoa Forster, 1987

- P. isolata Forster, 1987 (type) — New Zealand

== Progradungula ==
Progradungula Forster & Gray, 1979

- P. carraiensis Forster & Gray, 1979 (type) — Australia (New South Wales)
- P. otwayensis Milledge, 1997 — Australia (Victoria)

== Spelungula ==
Spelungula

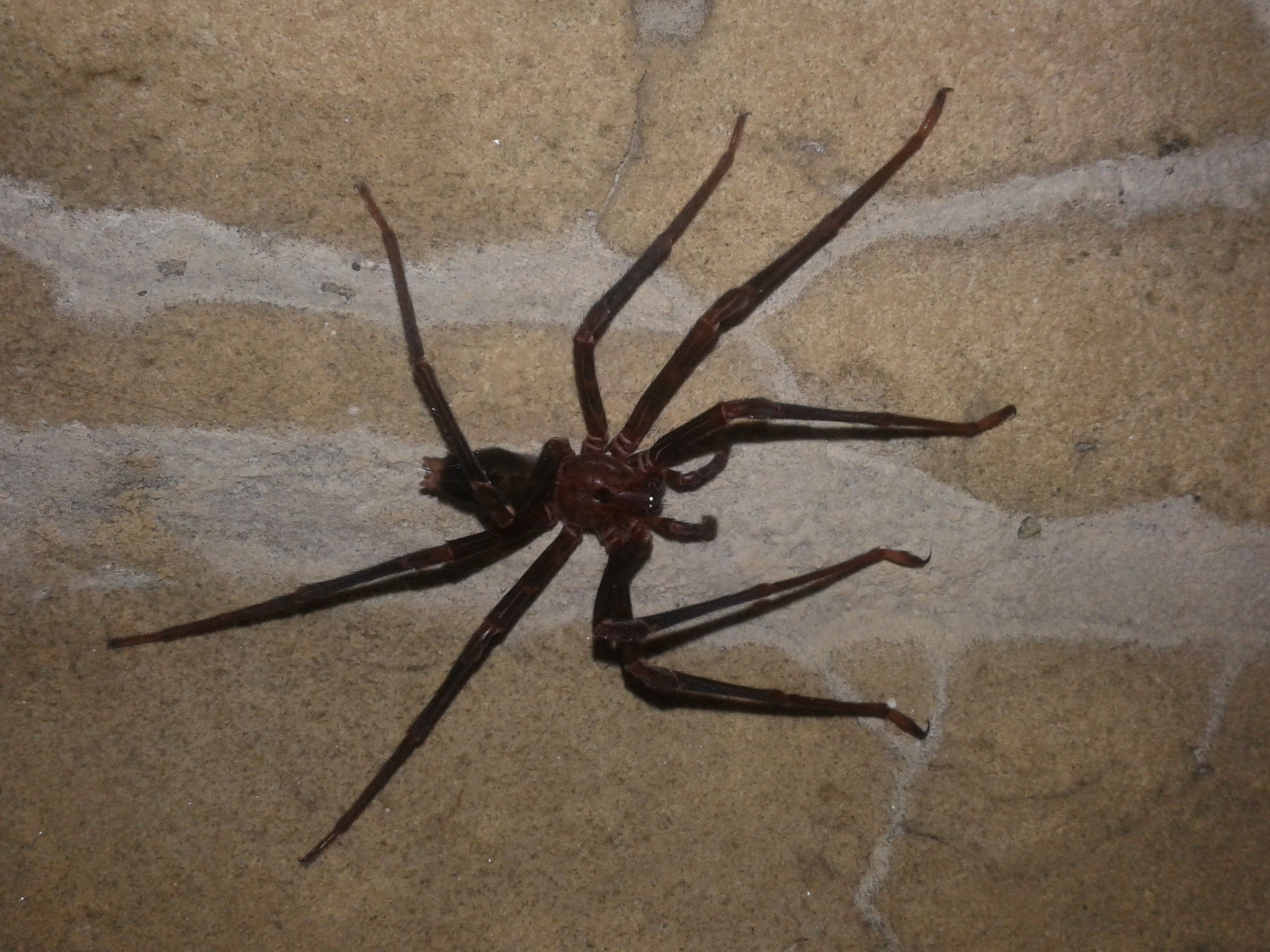
Spelungula cavernicola

Spelungula Forster, 1987

- S. cavernicola Forster, 1987 (type) — New Zealand

== Tarlina ==
Tarlina Gray, 1987

- T. daviesae Gray, 1987 — Australia (Queensland)
- T. milledgei Gray, 1987 — Australia (New South Wales)
- T. noorundi Gray, 1987 (type) — Australia (New South Wales)
- T. simipes Gray, 1987 — Australia (Queensland)
- T. smithersi Gray, 1987 — Australia (New South Wales)
- T. woodwardi (Forster, 1955) — Australia (Queensland)
