= Spiders of New Zealand =

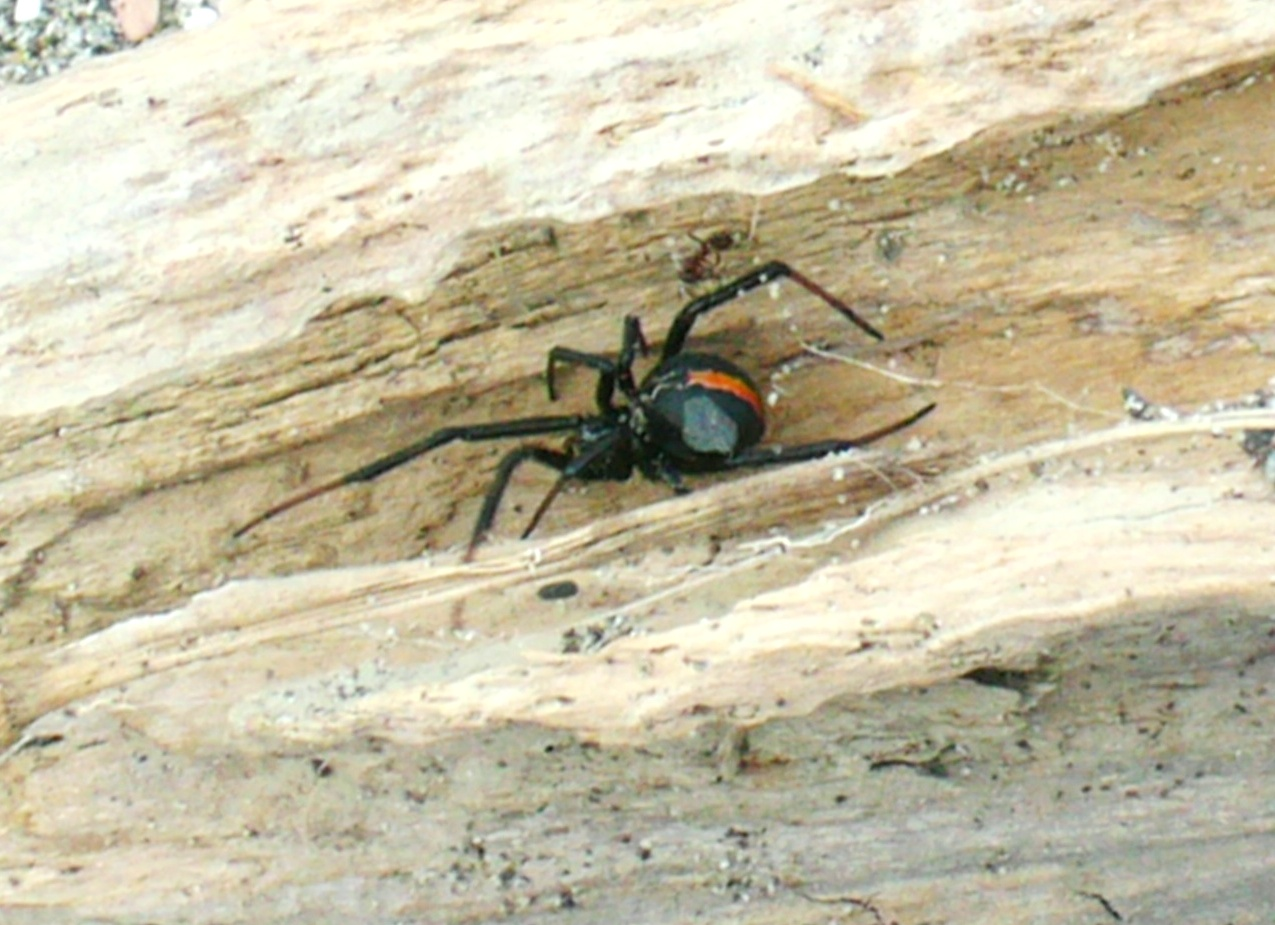
A katipō spider under a piece of driftwood

New Zealand has an estimated 2,000 species of spiders, with over 1,100 species described scientifically. Over 90% are endemic, with the approximately 70 non-endemic species being introduced through association with humans or by natural processes such as ballooning.

The New Zealand spider with the largest leg span is the Nelson cave spider (Spelungula cavernicola), with a leg span of up to 13 centimetres (5.1 in) and a body length of about 3 centimetres (1.2 in).

The flat huntsman spider (Delena cancerides), called the Avondale spider in New Zealand, was accidentally introduced from Australia in the early 1920s, possibly in shipments of hardwood logs used for railway sleepers. It is considered harmless to humans, and individuals have been collected for use in at least two films.

Very few New Zealand spiders have bites that can cause significant injury to humans, and, of these, only one – the katipō – is endemic. Katipō bites have been known to cause systemic effects, such as hypertension, seizure, or coma, though no deaths as a result of katipō bites have been recorded for over 200 years. Its more dangerous close relative, the venomous Australian redback spider, has established a foothold in some parts of New Zealand, notably in Taranaki and Central Otago. The Australian white-tailed spider, first recorded in New Zealand in 1886, has been falsely attributed as the cause of many necrotising spider bites.

== Fishing spiders ==
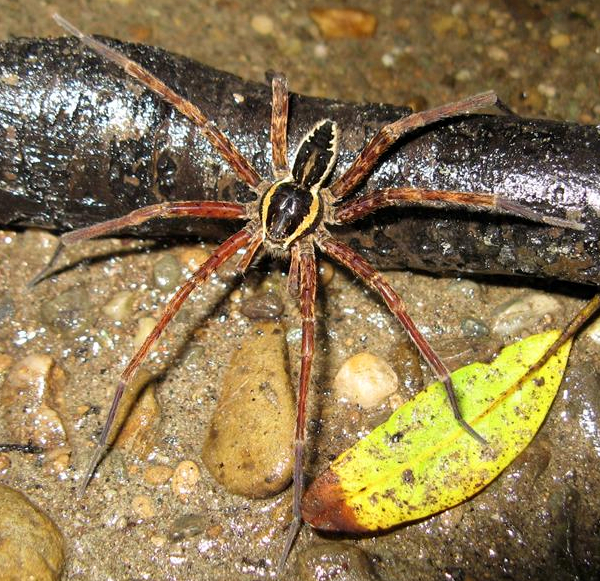
Male Dolomedes dondalei

There are four spiders in the genus Dolomedes (the fishing spiders), species which have adapted to hunt on the surface of water.

Three of the fishing spiders are widespread on the two main islands of New Zealand. Dolomedes aquaticus grows up to 7 centimetres (2.8 in) across and specialises in open, unforested riverbanks, and lives under rocks within 5 metres (16 ft) of the river. A species of similar size, Dolomedes dondalei, specialises in forested riverbanks and is also widespread on the mainland. The third and most common species, Dolomedes minor, is not restricted to rivers. Known as the nursery web spider, it makes white nursery webs on shrubs, but is still capable of fishing behaviour. The largest of the New Zealand fishing spiders is Dolomedes schauinslandi and occurs on South East and Mangere islands in the Chatham Islands.

== List of taxa ==
Spider taxa in New Zealand include:

- Anoteropsis (wolf spiders)
- Cambridgea spp. (sheetweb spider)
- Celaenia spp.
- Cryptachaea veruculata
- Delena cancerides (Avondale spider)
- Dolomedes aquaticus
- Dolomedes dondalei
- Dolomedes minor
- Gradungula
- Gradungulidae
- Haurokoa
- Hexathele hochstetteri (banded tunnelweb spider)
- Lamponidae (white-tailed spiders)
- Latrodectus hasselti (redback spider)
- Latrodectus katipo (katipō)
- Paradictyna spp.
- Paradictyna rufoflava
- Pholcus phalangioides (daddy long-legs)
- Poecilopachys australasia (two-spined spider)
- Porrhothele antipodiana (black tunnelweb spider)
- Spelungula cavernicola (Nelson cave spider)
- Steatoda capensis (black cobweb spider or false katipō)
- Trite parvula (house hopper spider)
- Trite planiceps (black-headed jumping spider)
- Uliodon spp. (vagrant spiders)
