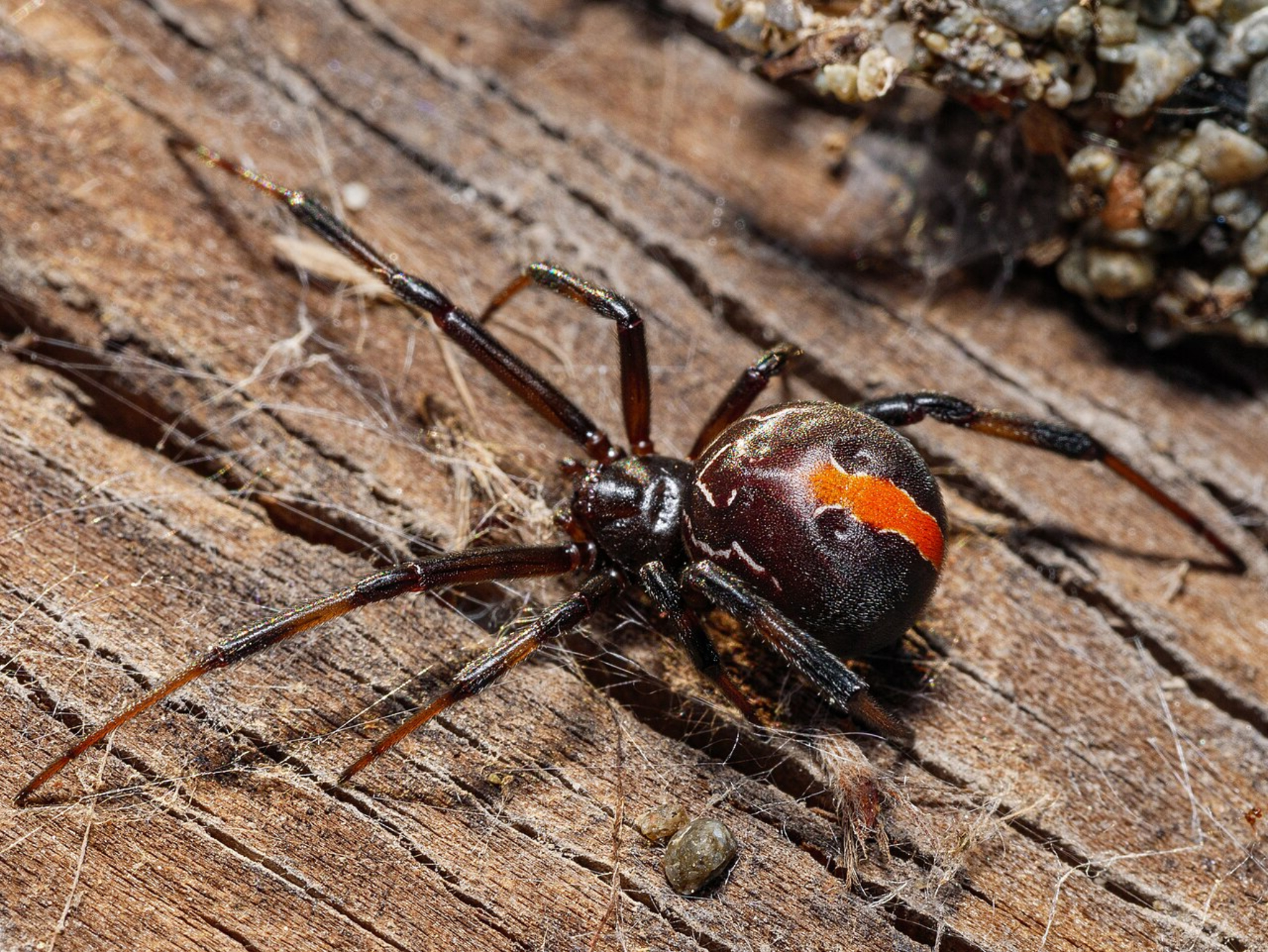
- Female katipō

Conservation status
- Declining (NZ TCS)

Scientific classification
- Kingdom: Animalia
- Phylum: Arthropoda
- Subphylum: Chelicerata
- Class: Arachnida
- Order: Araneae
- Infraorder: Araneomorphae
- Family: Theridiidae
- Genus: Latrodectus
- Species: L. katipo

Binomial name
- Latrodectus katipo Powell, 1871

Synonyms
- Theridium melanozantha Urquhart, 1887; Theridium zebrinia Urquhart, 1890; Latrodectus katipo atritus Urquhart, 1890; Latrodectus hasseltii atritus Parrott, 1948; Latrodectus atritus Forster, 1995

= Katipō =

Species of spider

Katipō (pronounced /kɑːtɪˈpɔː/ kah-tih-PAW or /ˈkɑːtəpoʊ/ KAH-tə-poh; Latrodectus katipo) is a species of cobweb spider found only in New Zealand. It is one of many species in the genus Latrodectus and is most closely related to the Australian redback (L. hasseltii). It is venomous to humans, its bite being capable of producing the toxic syndrome latrodectism; symptoms include extreme pain and, potentially, hypertension or seizure. Bites are rare and antivenom is available in some hospitals. The female is 8–10 millimetres (0.31–0.39 in) in length; the male is 4–5 millimetres (0.16–0.20 in). In the South Island and the lower half of the North Island, the female has a distinct red stripe bordered in white on its abdomen; in more northern populations this stripe is absent, pale, yellow, or replaced with cream-coloured blotches. These two forms were previously thought to be separate species. The male is white with black stripes and red hourglass-shaped markings.

The katipō is mainly found living in sand dunes close to the seashore. It is found throughout most of coastal New Zealand except the far south and the West Coast. It feeds mainly on ground-dwelling insects, caught in an irregular tangled web spun among dune plants or other debris. After mating, the female katipō produces five or six egg sacs in November or December. The juveniles hatch after 20–25 days, and during January and February they disperse into surrounding plants. The common name is from Māori for "night stinger", which is derived from the words kakati (to sting) and pō (the night). Due to habitat loss, colonisation of their natural habitat by invasive spiders and hybridisation with L. hasseltii, the katipō is listed as "in serious decline" by the New Zealand Threat Classification System.

== Taxonomy ==
The katipō was reported as early as 1855 as the kātĕpo, but was not formally described in taxonomic literature until 1870, when New Zealand doctor Llewellyn Powell described it as Latrodectus katipo. Swedish arachnologist Tamerlan Thorell later placed it in Latrodectus scelio, a previous name for Latrodectus hasseltii (redback spider). Later, New Zealand arachnologist Arthur Urquhart unknowingly described it again as two species: Theridium melanozantha in 1887 and Theridium zebrinia in 1890. He also described Latrodectus katipo var. atritus, a subspecies of katipō that was fully black in colour. In 1933, Urquhart's two species were later recognised to be the same as L. katipo by American arachnologist Elizabeth Bryant and thus were synonymised. Several taxonomic studies have disagreed over whether to treat L. katipo as a separate species or as a synonym of L. hasseltii with L. atritus as a subspecies. Eventually, it was concluded that L. katipo, together with L. katipo var. atritus, are separate from L. hasseltii.

There was further confusion over whether L. katipo and L. katipo var. atritus should be considered separate species due to their very similar morphology but notably different distributions. Although they were designated as separate species for a time, this was clarified when the species was revised again in 2008. In this revision, L. atritus was formally recognised to be the same as L. katipo on the basis of genetic data and thus was synonymised. It was proposed that the colour variation seen between these two groups is a cline, or gradual continuous variation over latitude, and is correlated with mean annual temperature.

The katipō is a member of the genus Latrodectus. This genus has a worldwide distribution with notable members such as Latrodectus mactans (black widow spider), Latrodectus geometricus (brown widow spider) and Latrodectus hasseltii (redback spider), to the latter of which the katipō is most closely related. It is a member of the family Theridiidae, which are commonly known as cobweb spiders or comb-footed spiders.

=== Etymology ===
Phylogenetic tree of Latrodectus

- - - Latrodectus geometricus
    - Latrodectus rhodesiensis
  - - Latrodectus tredecimguttatus
    - - - Latrodectus tredecimguttatus
        - Latrodectus renivulvatus
      - - - Latrodectus hasselti
          - Latrodectus katipo
        - - Latrodectus menavodi
          - - - Latrodectus revivensis
              - Latrodectus pallidus
            - - - - Latrodectus mactans
                  - Latrodectus hesperus
                - - Latrodectus variolus
                  - Latrodectus bishopi
              - - - Latrodectus antheratus
                  - - Latrodectus corallinus
                    - Latrodectus diaguita
                - Latrodectus mirabilis
              - Latrodectus variegatus
- Steatoda grossa

The common name and specific name katipō (singular and plural), often spelt "katipo", is Māori for "night stinger", derived from the words kakati (to sting) and pō (the night). It is one of the few Māori words that refers to a specific species of spider. The fully black variant is referred to as black katipō.

=== Phylogeny ===
A 2004 study examined the genetic relationships of Latrodectus spiders using sequences from part of the cytochrome c oxidase subunit I gene. The study found that the katipō are most closely related to the Australian Latrodectus hasseltii (redback spider). The katipō are so closely related to the redback that the katipō was thought to be a subspecies of the redback. Further research has shown that the katipō is genetically and morphologically distinct from the redback, having slight structural differences and striking differences in habitat preference.

== Description ==
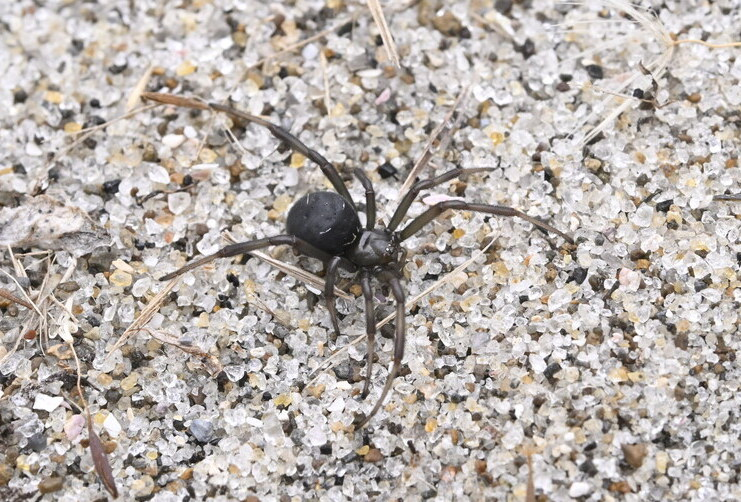
Black katipō variant that occurs in the northern half of the North Island

As an adult, the female has a body size of 8–10 millimetres (0.31–0.39 in) or 35–41 millimetres (1.4–1.6 in) if leg span is included. The red katipō, found in the South Island and the lower North Island, has a large black globular abdomen with a silky appearance and a distinctive white-bordered orange or red stripe on its upper surface that runs from the beginning of the abdomen back to the spinnerets. The underside of the abdomen is black and has a red patch or partial red hourglass-shaped marking. For the black katipō, found in the upper North Island, the abdomen differs in not having the upper red/orange stripe and is overall somewhat lighter in colour. The hourglass pattern on the underside of the abdomen may also be less distinct, losing the middle section. Rare variations in black katipō also exist where the abdomen, cephalothorax, or entire body is brown, sometimes with a dull red or yellow stripe, or cream-coloured spots on its upper side.

The katipō is most similar to its sister species Latrodectus hasselti. The katipō can be distinguished from L. hasselti by the short setae (hair-like spines) of the abdomen, whereas on the abdomen of L. hasselti it is a mix of long and short setae. There are also minor differences in the shape of the female and male genitalia structures. It may also be confused for Steatoda species, which are often present in the same habitat. One of the species, Steatoda capensis, is so similar that they are commonly referred to in New Zealand as "false katipō". The katipō has a less shiny and more tapered abdomen, and the lateral eyes (eyes at the side of the head) are further apart.

=== Males and juveniles ===
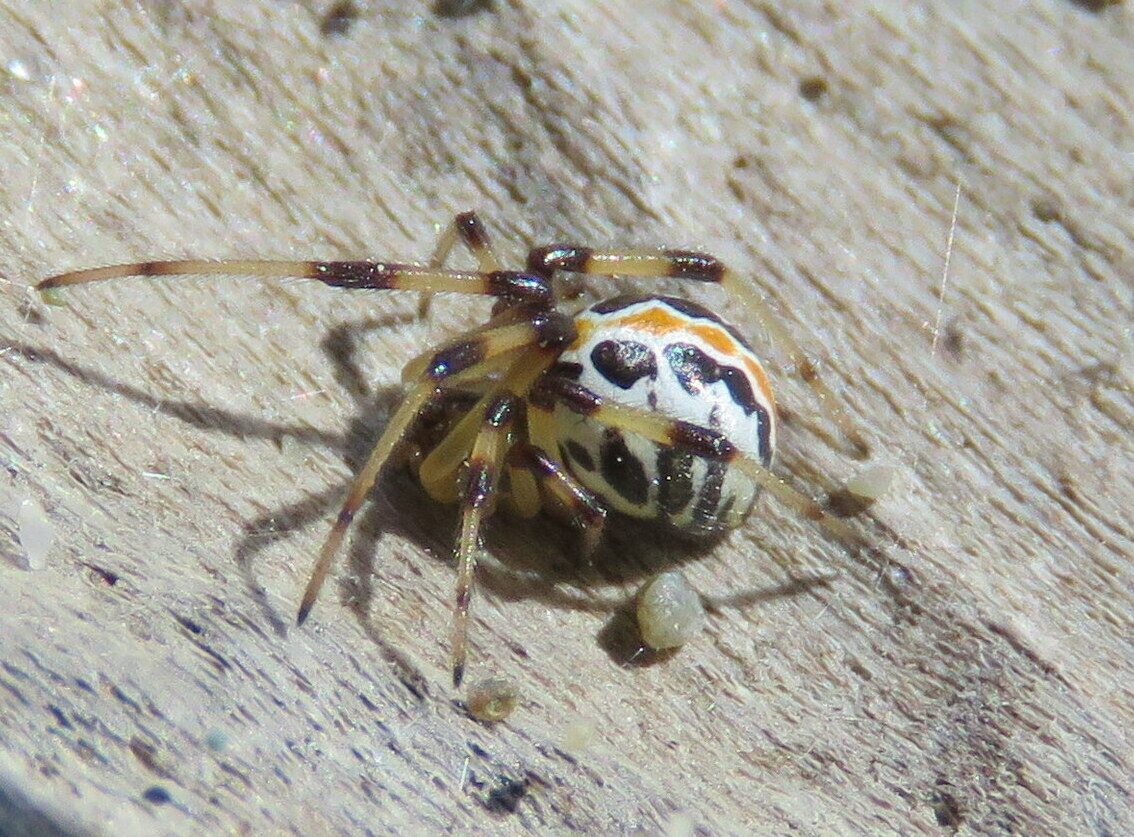
A juvenile katipō

As juveniles, the female and male are identical until their fourth instar, a developmental stage that occurs between moults. Before this, they are coloured whitish and have black markings running vertically down the abdomen. The abdomen also frequently has traces of red. The male, which is 4–5 millimetres (0.16–0.20 in) in length, keeps this juvenile colour pattern as an adult.

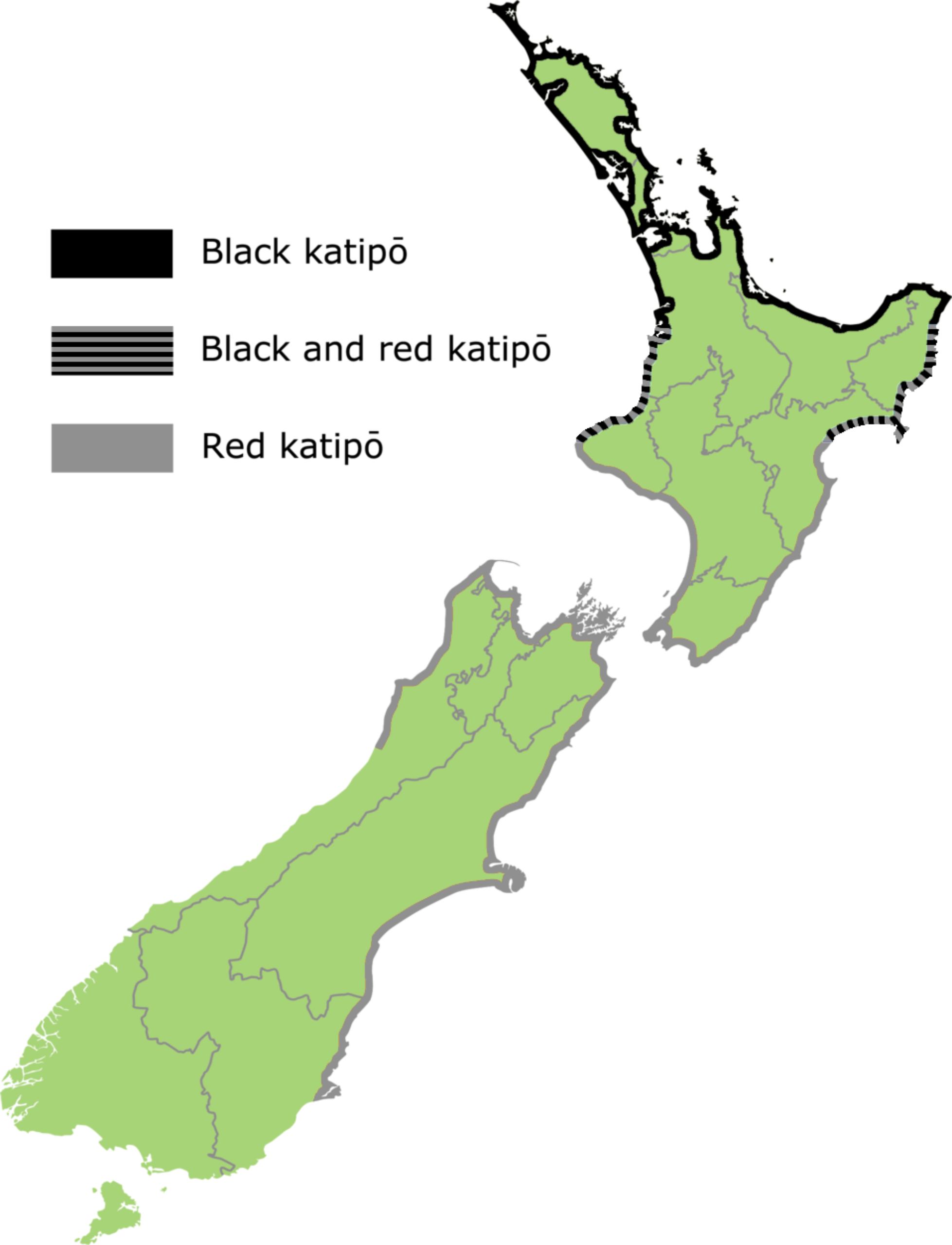
Distribution map of the katipō

== Distribution and habitat ==
The katipō is only found in New Zealand. In the North Island it is found throughout the West Coast from North Cape to Wellington. On the east coast of the North Island it occurs irregularly, but it is abundant on Great Barrier Island. In the South Island it is found in coastal regions south to Dunedin on the east coast and south to Greymouth on the west coast. It has been proposed that this southern limit is due to the katipō needing warmer temperatures to allow for the development of their eggs.

The red katipō is found south of the western tip of Taranaki on the west coast, and just north of Waipatiki Beach in Hawke's Bay on the east coast. The black katipō are found north of Aotea Harbour in the Waikato region on the west coast, and Waipiro Bay in the Gisbourne region on the east coast. Both forms are found in a transitionary area in between these aforementioned localities. These colour variants are strongly correlated with temperature, one study reporting that the red katipō is found in cooler areas with average temperatures of 11.24–13.85 °C (52.23–56.93 °F). In contrast, the black katipō is found in warmer areas with average temperatures of 13.64–16.23 °C (56.55–61.21 °F).

=== Habitat ===
The katipō is restricted to coastal sand dunes near the seashore. It generally resides on the landward side of dunes closest to the coast where it is most sheltered from storms and sand movement. It can sometimes be associated with dunes several kilometers from the sea when these dunes extend inland for long distances.

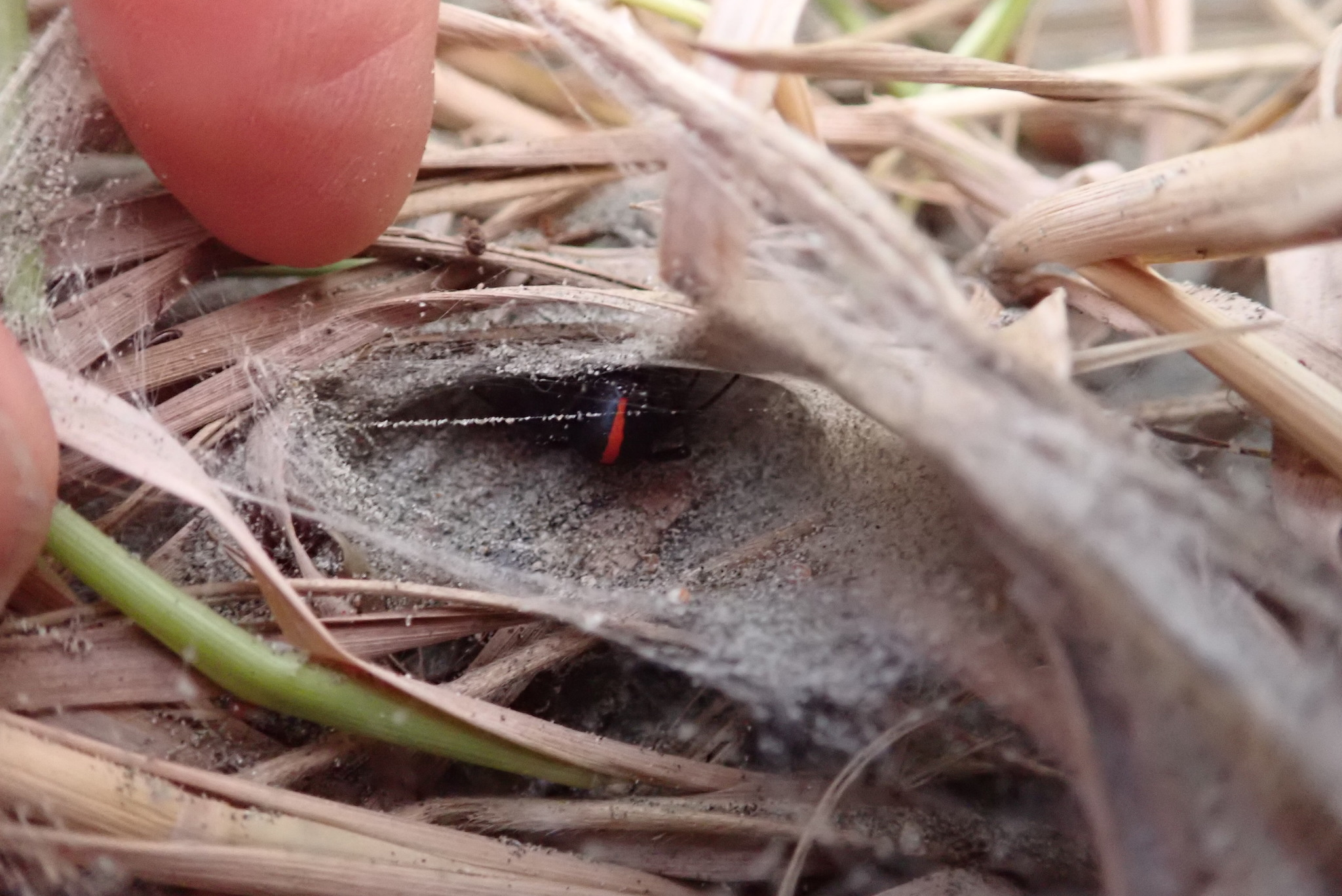
A katipō nest in plant vegetation

Webs are typically established in low-growing dune plants and other vegetation such as the native pīngao (Ficinia spiralis) or the introduced marram grass (Ammophila arenaria). The spider may also build its web under driftwood, stones, or other debris such as rubbish. This behaviour can be exploited by researchers and conservationists by placing plywood lids in katipō habitat, under which the spider hides, allowing its populations to be easily sampled. Webs are almost always constructed over open sand and near the ground so as to catch crawling insects for food. The katipō inhabiting dune grasses constructs its web in open spaces between the grass tufts; the katipō inhabiting areas of shrubbery does so on the underside of a plant overhanging open sand. It has been found that these patches of open sand are necessary for the katipō to build its web, as plants that envelop sand dunes in dense cover, such as invasive plants like kikuyu or buffalo grass, create an environment unsuitable for web construction. The katipō commonly spins its web among pīngao as this plant's growth pattern leaves patches of sand between each plant. Marram grass has been extensively planted in New Zealand to help stabilise sand dunes and has largely replaced pīngao in many areas. Because marram grass grows in a very tight formation only leaving small gaps between tuffs, this makes it difficult for the katipō to construct a suitable web for capturing prey. Due to this, it has been demonstrated that the katipō are less abundant in dunes dominated by marram grass than they are in dunes dominated by pīngao.

== Life history ==
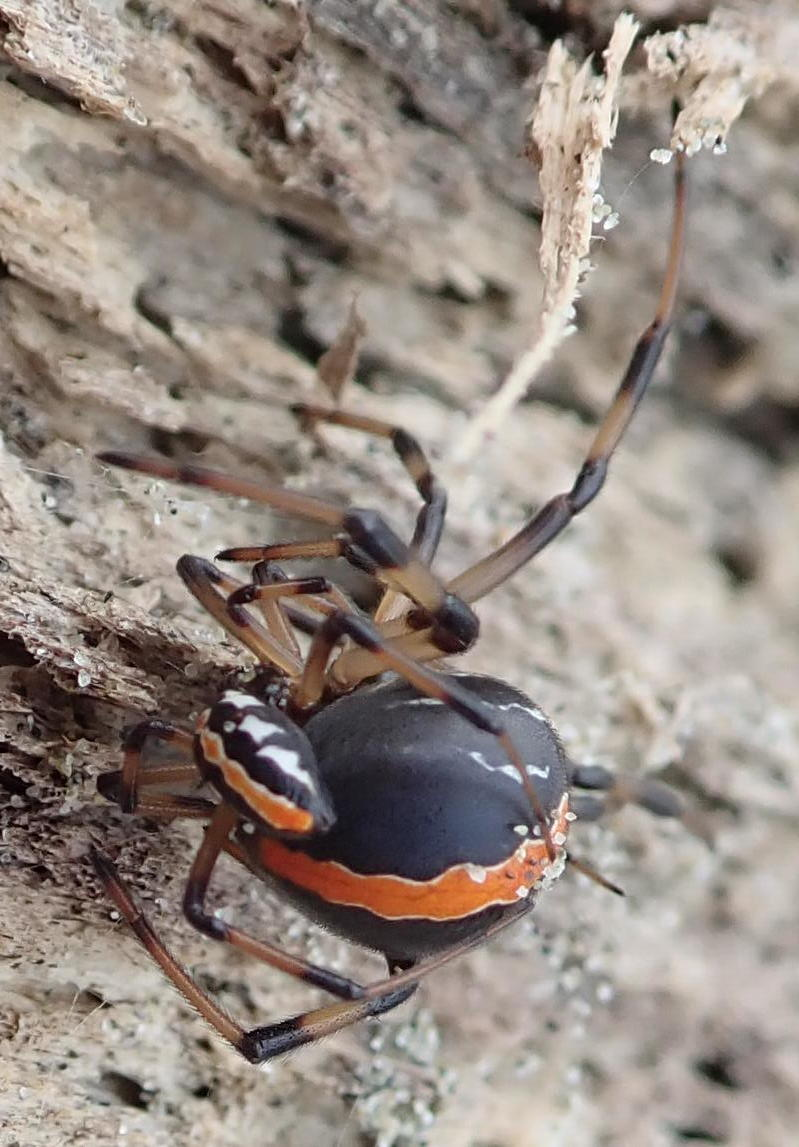
Male (left) and female (right) copulating

=== Reproduction ===
Once it becomes an adult, the male begins to search for a female with which to mate, possibly being guided by pheromones in female's silk. The male enters the female's web and gently vibrates the silk as he approaches her. The female is usually aggressive at first and will chase the male from the web. The courtship process consists of the male bobbing, plucking and tweaking the web along with periods of cautious approach and being chased by the female. Eventually, she becomes docile and allows him to approach. The male moves to the underside of her abdomen, tapping her rapidly until their abdomens are aligned in the same direction. He then inserts his palps (appendages modified for reproduction) into the female's reproductive tract one at a time. Copulation occurs over 10 to 30 minutes. After mating, the male retreats to groom, which is performed by running his palps and legs through his fangs and wiping them over his body. The male is not eaten by the female unlike some other widow spiders.

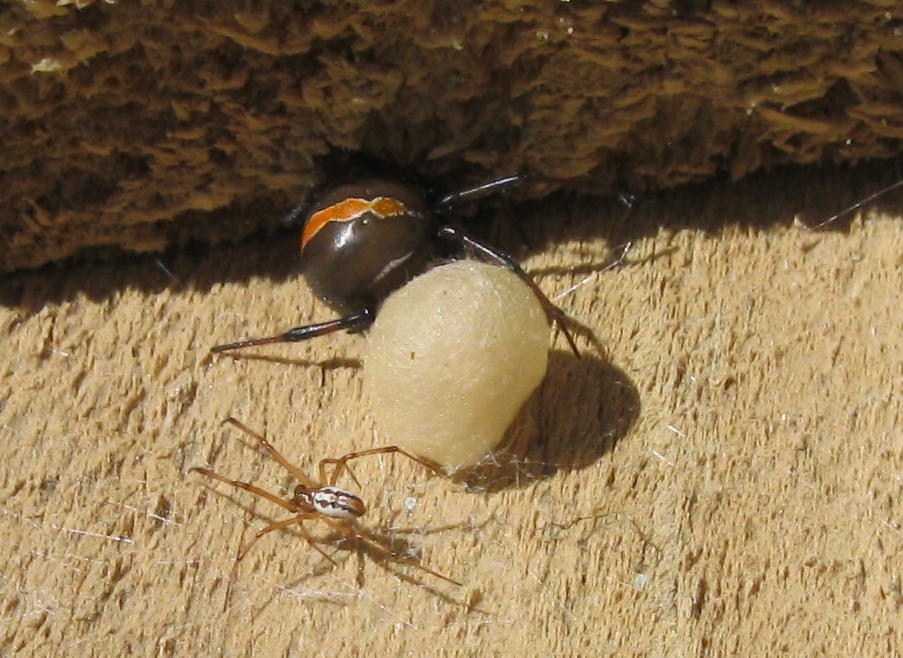
Female katipō with egg sac, and male, in a box on Rangaiika Beach

The female lays its eggs in November or December. The eggs are round, about the size of a mustard seed, and are a transparent, purplish red. They are held together in a cream-coloured, round, ball-shaped egg sac which is about 12 millimetres (0.47 in) in diameter. The female constructs five or six egg sacs over the next three to four weeks. Each egg sac contains about 70 to 90 fertilised eggs. The egg sacs are hung in the centre of the spider's web and the female spins more silk over them, which becomes covered in sand and conceals them somewhat.

The eggs hatch after 20–25 days and continue to develop within the egg sac where they remain until the second instar, at which stage they feed on the wall of the egg sac. After four to six weeks of incubation, during January and February, the juveniles chew their way out of the egg sac. The young spiders then disperse from the web. In one 24-hour study of juveniles, 28% dispersed from the web by ballooning—using air currents to carry themselves away from the nest on a single silk strand. The majority, 61%, used bridging, moving to nearby plants along silk threads, while 11% remained in the nest.

Because they are closely related, the male redback is able to successfully interbreed with a female katipō to produce hybrid offspring. However, a male katipō cannot mate with the female redback as the male katipō is heavier than the male redback, and when it approaches the web it triggers a predatory response in the female leading to the male usually being eaten before mating can occur. There is evidence of interbreeding between katipō and redbacks in the wild, one specimen reported to have redback DNA in its maternal lineage.

=== Population demographics ===
The proportion of females, males and juveniles in a population varies somewhat depending on site. As adults, the female is generally more abundant than the male, probably because the male lives on average 77 days whereas the female can live for two years. Along the Manawatū–Whanganui coastline, only adult females were found in some surveyed sites, whereas at other sites the juveniles were more common than the adults. It has been proposed that sites with few juveniles detected may be due to low reproductive output.

== Behaviour and ecology ==
=== Prey capture ===
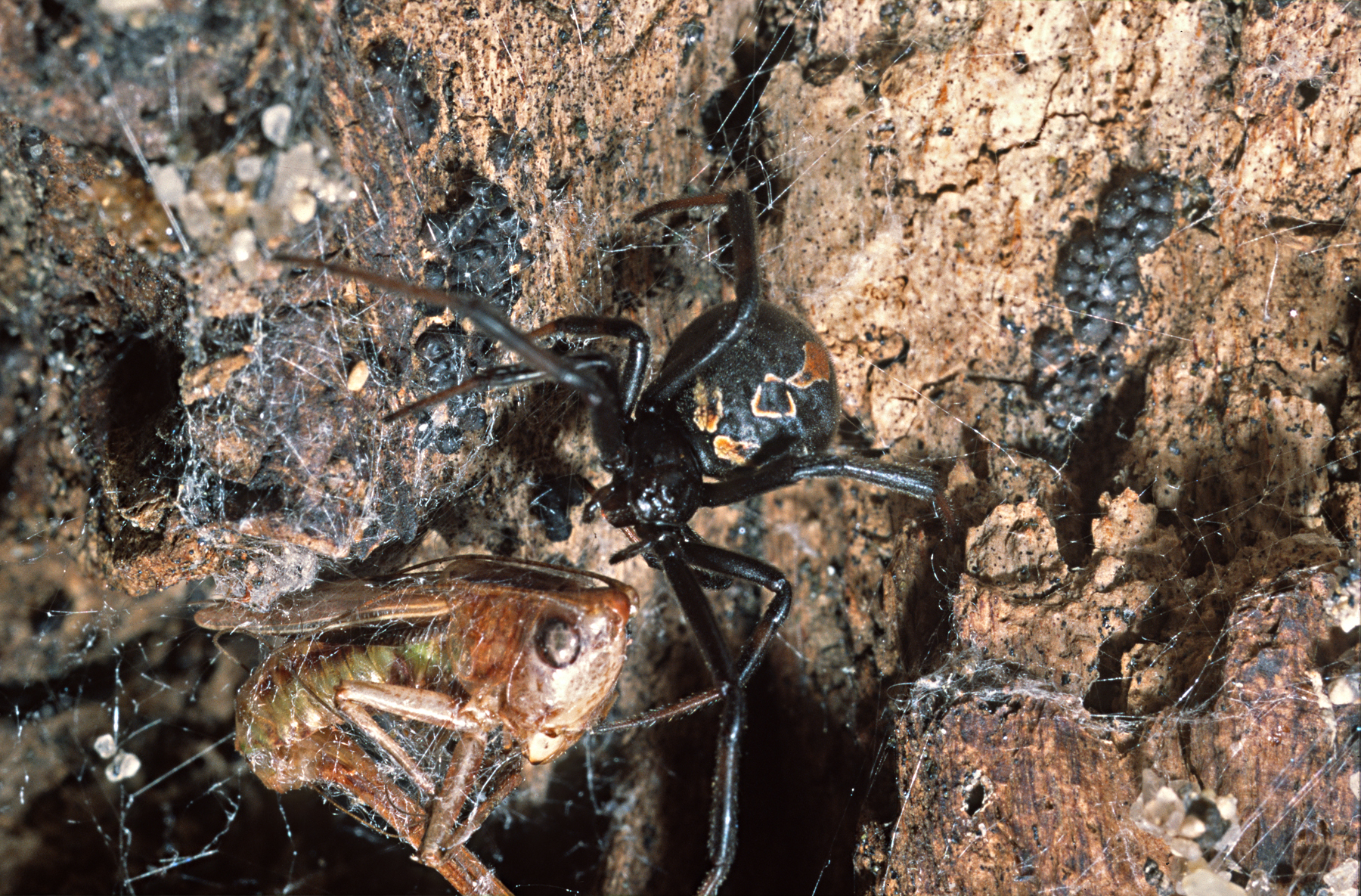
Katipō with captured prey

Katipō prey varies depending upon location, but it typically catches wandering ground invertebrates such as beetles (e.g. Cecyropa modesta) or amphipods (e.g. Bellorchestia quoyana), but it may occasionally catch moths, flies, and other spiders. The katipō can catch insects much larger than itself. These insects often become entangled in the web, and in the ensuing struggle the web's ground anchor line breaks. The silk's elasticity causes smaller prey to become suspended a few centimetres off the ground. Whether the prey is suspended, and how high, depends on how heavy the prey is. Earwigs caught in the web are not suspended at all whereas slaters, which are much lighter, can be suspended at varying heights. The katipō then moves to the prey, turns so that the spinnerets are facing it, and spins silk over it. Like most theridiids, the tarsi (last leg segment) of the hind legs have a row of strong curved bristles which are arranged as a comb. The katipō uses these to scoop sticky silk from its spinnerets and throws it over the insect with a series of rapid movements. After the insect is firmly immobilised, the spider bites it several times, usually at the joints, before spinning more silk to strengthen the web, and then administering a last long bite which ultimately kills the insect. The spider then moves the prey up into the web until it is ready to eat. If food is readily available then it is common to see five or six insects hanging in the web waiting to be ingested. The male's hunting behaviour is similar to the female's, although it may not be as powerful due to its smaller size.

=== Web structure ===
Like other theridiid spiders, the web is a seemingly disorganised tangle of silk. The structure consists of a retreat for the katipō to hide in and a catching web for obtaining prey. The retreat is loosely tube-shaped with an open end, and is generally formed inside the base of coastal tussocks or other debris. The walls of the retreat are interwoven and waterproof. The catching web extends out from the retreat and can be divided into three layers. The upper and middle layers are constructed horizontally. Of these, the upper layer is formed as a network of mesh that supports the middle layer, which forms a dense latticed sheet that extends in all directions. The lower layer is constructed vertically, with threads extending from the above layers to the ground. These threads have viscous droplets that can assist in capturing prey. The web is spun during the early morning and at night. If the web is destroyed, it can be rebuilt overnight rather quickly.

=== Predators ===
The eggs of the katipō have been observed being eaten by a small, undescribed native wasp from the family Ichneumonidae. It has also been proposed that house mice, which are not native to New Zealand, prey upon the katipō.

== Conservation status ==
Under the New Zealand Threat Classification System, the katipō is listed as "Declining", with the qualifiers of "Climate Impact", "Data Poor: Trend" and "Range Restricted". Several factors have contributed to its decline; the major factors appear to be habitat loss and the declining quality of the remaining habitat. Human interference with the katipō's natural habitat has been occurring for over a century following European settlement of New Zealand. Coastal dune modification resulting from agriculture, forestry, or urban development, along with recreational activities like the use of beach buggies, off-road vehicles, beach horse riding and driftwood collection, have destroyed or changed areas where the katipō lives. The introduction of many invasive plants may have also contributed to the decline of suitable habitat. It has been proposed that surfactants, which are used to improve herbicide efficiency, may pose an additional risk to the katipō.

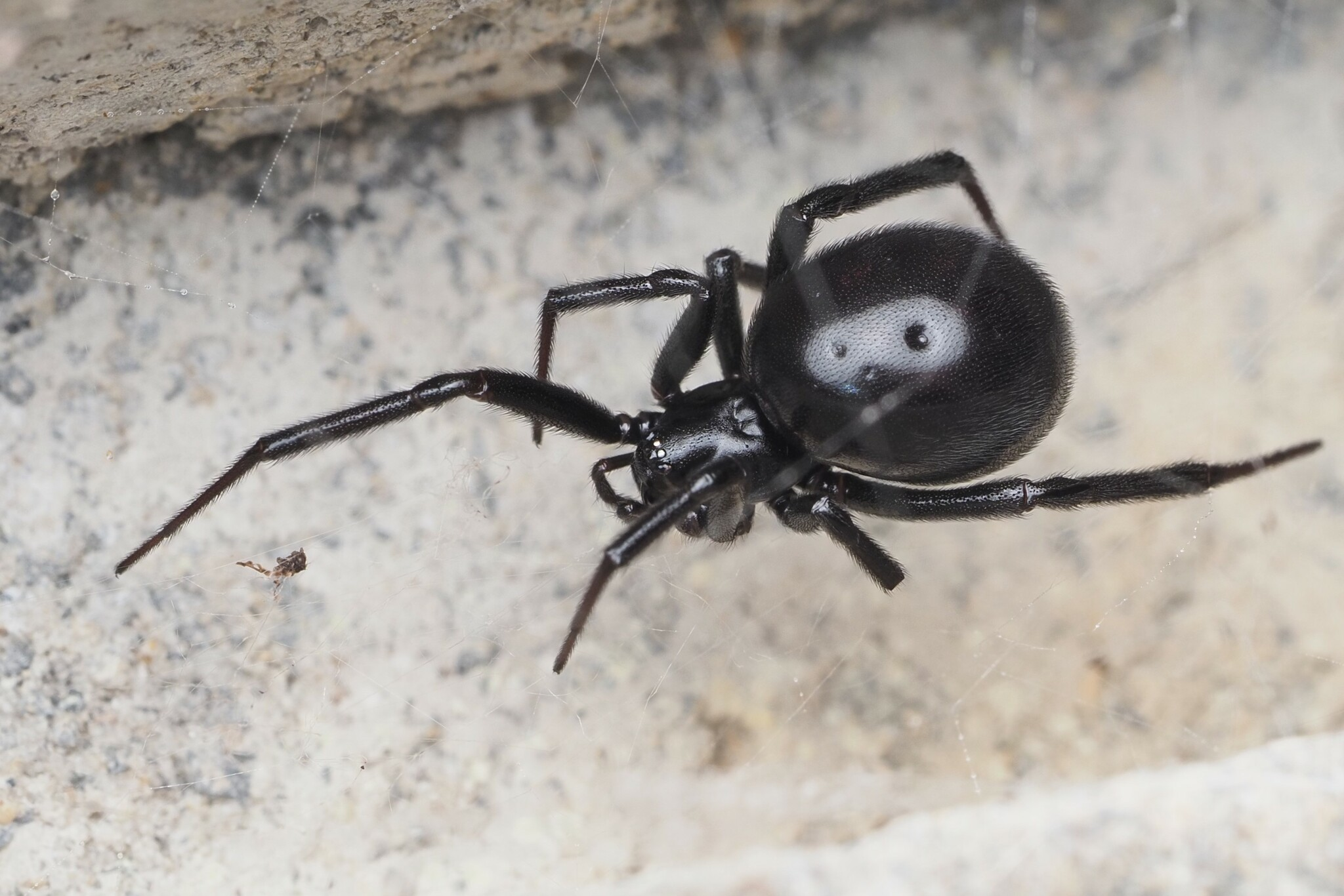
Steatoda capensis, the false katipō

Much of the katipō's habitat is occupied by the invasive spider Steatoda capensis (commonly known in New Zealand as "false katipō"), a South African species that became common in New Zealand during the 20th century. Both species can be found sharing the same dune systems or even co-existing under the same piece of driftwood. There is evidence that displacement of the katipō is occurring due to the ability of S. capensis to quickly recolonise areas from which the katipō has become displaced after storms or other dune modifications. Furthermore, S. capensis breeds year-round, produces more offspring, and lives in a greater range of habitats, leading to greater pressure on the katipō's survival.

A 2025 study comparing the movement ecology of adult male katipō and S. capensis from overlapping populations collected at Te Ariā Beach in Auckland found that male S. capensis were significantly more exploratory than katipō in laboratory conditions. S. capensis emerged more readily into a maze arena and explored a greater area, while katipō were more reclusive. In running tests, S. capensis completed the track faster and without stopping, whereas katipō would occasionally freeze — a behaviour consistent with an anti-predator crouching response. Both species showed similar climbing performance. The researchers concluded that the higher exploratory behaviour of S. capensis may facilitate their rapid recolonisation of vacant microhabitats in sand dunes left open by storm damage or human disturbance, potentially contributing to the displacement of katipō.

In 2010, the katipō was one of a dozen previously unprotected species of invertebrate given full protection under the 1953 Wildlife Act, noted as "iconic, vulnerable to harm, and in serious decline". Under the Act, killing an absolutely-protected species such as the katipō is punishable by a fine or even imprisonment. It has been proposed that restoration of sand dune habitat, including the replacing of marram grass (Ammophila arenaria) with native dune plants, would provide more suitable habitat for the katipō to conserve their populations. Reducing activities that damage sand dunes, such as off-road driving and rubbish dumping, may also protect the species.

== Toxicology ==
The katipō has venom that is medically significant in humans, meaning it has the potential to cause serious injury or death. Antivenom is available in some hospitals to treat bites. No deaths due to the bite have been recorded in medical settings. The incidence of bites is low as it is a shy, non-aggressive spider. Their narrow range, diminishing population, and human awareness of where they live means humans rarely encounter katipō. The katipō will only bite defensively. If the female is with an egg sac it will remain close by it and be more aggressive. Envenomation from bites of the katipō cause effects known as latrodectism. The venoms of all Latrodectus spiders are thought to contain similar components with the neurotoxin α-latrotoxin being the main agent responsible. One study reported that only the female is capable of biting humans.

Māori legends recall deaths due to bites. One legend states that a group of Māori camped out at the mouth of the Whanganui River were bitten overnight, and two died. In Māori tradition, katipō bite victims would be treated by bathing them in hot water or covering the bite wound in red ochre, which supposedly reduced swelling and pain. Alternatively they would also cover the victim in smoke. Bites are very rare, 23 of the 37 known hospitalisations for spider bites between 1967 and 1976 in New Zealand being attributed to katipō bites. The most recent reported katipō bites (as of 2026) were to a Canadian tourist in 2010 and a kayaker in 2012, both of whom survived.

=== Symptoms ===
The symptoms of a katipō bite are considered to be extremely similar to the bite of L. hasselti. The bite may be initially painful, but it sometimes only feels like a pin prick or mild burning sensation. Within an hour victims generally develop more severe local pain with local sweating and sometimes piloerection (goosebumps). Pain, swelling and redness spread away from the site. Less commonly, systemic envenoming is heralded by swollen or tender regional lymph nodes; associated features include malaise, nausea, vomiting, abdominal or chest pain, generalised sweating, headache, fever and hypertension. The duration of effects can range from a few hours to days, with severe pain persisting for over 24 hours after being bitten in some cases.

=== Treatment ===
Treatment is based on the severity of the bite; only oral analgesics being needed in less severe cases or parenteral analgesics being used in more severe cases. If symptoms do not resolve, then redback antivenom may be used, which can neutralise the katipō venom. Stocks of the antivenom are available in some New Zealand hospitals. Unlike some other antivenoms, it is not limited to patients with signs of severe, systemic envenoming. Opioids and benzodiazepines can be used as an initial treatment for latrodectism.
