= Wildlife Act 1953 =

Act of Parliament in New Zealand

New Zealand Parliament
- Long title: An Act to consolidate and amend the law relating to the protection and control of wild animals and birds, the regulation of game shooting seasons, and the constitution and powers of acclimatisation societies

Legislative history
- Passed: 1953
- Status: Current legislation

Wildlife Act 1953 is an Act of Parliament in New Zealand. Under the act, the majority of native New Zealand vertebrate species are protected by law, and may not be hunted, killed, eaten or possessed. Violations may be punished with fines of up to $100,000.

Wildlife are classified under a number of schedules; all vertebrate species not included in these lists are protected by default. The schedules are occasionally amended; for example the kea was granted full protection in 1984, whereas the spur-winged plover (masked lapwing), an Australian species which naturally established itself in New Zealand in the 1930s, had its protected status removed in 2012.

The Act also provides for wildlife sanctuaries, refuges and management reserves.

== Schedules ==
=== Schedule 1 – Wildlife declared to be game ===
This group comprises commonly hunted waterfowl (mallard, grey duck, Australasian shoveler, paradise shelduck, black swan and pūkeko) and introduced game birds, including pheasant, quail, chukar and partridge. These birds may be hunted during the open season, which begins in early May and lasts approximately four weeks.

=== Schedule 2 – Partially protected wildlife ===
This group comprises just the little owl, the silvereye and, on the Chatham Islands only, the brown skua (Catharacta antarctica lonnbergi). These birds may be shot by landowners if they pose a threat to crops or livestock, without any need for a permit from the Department of Conversation. This group formerly included the kea, which has been blamed for attacking sheep, but is now considered endangered.

=== Schedule 3 – Wildlife that may be hunted or killed subject to Minister's notification ===
These may be culled on application to the Department of Conservation, subject to whatever restrictions are imposed. This group includes the Australasian harrier, grey teal, grey-faced petrel, mute swan, black shag, little shag, pied shag and sooty shearwater.

=== Schedule 4 – Wildlife not protected, except in areas and during periods specified in Minister's notification ===
This group formerly consisted of feral horses, which had some degree of protection in the Kaimanawa range, but is now obsolete.

=== Schedule 5 – Wildlife not protected ===
This is a large group that includes many common domestic and introduced species, many of which are regarded as pests. It includes numerous land mammals and birds, three species of Australian Litoria tree frogs, the Australian rainbow skink (Lampropholis delicata) and the North American red-eared slider turtle (Trachemys scripta elegans). The only species on this list that occur naturally in New Zealand are the southern black-backed gull and the spur-winged plover (masked lapwing), both of which present a significant risk of bird strike.

=== Schedule 6 – Animals declared to be wild animals subject to the Wild Animal Control Act 1977 ===
This group consists of the chamois, Himalayan tahr, goats (the genus Capra), pigs (the genus Sus) and all species of deer (the family Cervidae). All are considered harmful to New Zealand's native forests and may be hunted without restriction.

=== Schedule 7 – Terrestrial and freshwater invertebrates declared to be animals ===
Under the original legislation, the word "animal" referred only to land-based vertebrates. Schedule 7 was added to give protected status to a number of native invertebrates, most of them endangered. The species include two native grasshoppers, many species of beetle, including the Cromwell chafer and the coxella weevil, all giant wētā, the katipō spider, the Nelson cave spider, and several kinds of native snails including all Powelliphanta and Placostylus.

=== Schedule 7A – Marine species declared to be animals ===
Similarly, this list gives protected status to a number of marine species, including some corals (notably black coral), several sharks, and two species of grouper.

== Enforcement ==
Leisure shark cage diving was authorized in New Zealand in 2008, but its disturbance to the marine ecosystem made its compliance with the Wildlife Act 1953 debatable.

In 2024, a fisherman in New Zealand was fined for killing a white shark and failing to notify the authorities, a direct violation of the Wildlife Act 1953.

== Critics ==
The Wildlife Act 1953 was designed as a protection mechanism, but not as an instrument for wildlife management. Despite its many amendments and revisions, New Zealand's Green Party has been campaigning for a new Wildlife Act. In a 2019 paper, the Department of Conservation described the Wildlife Act 1953 as “overlapping, contradictory, contested, ineffective”, “slow” and “outdated”, and the legislative regimes as being “not able to adapt well to the current and future pressures they need to respond to”.

== See also ==
- Conservation in New Zealand
- Endangered Species Act of 1973 (USA)
- Environment Protection and Biodiversity Conservation Act 1999 (Australia)
