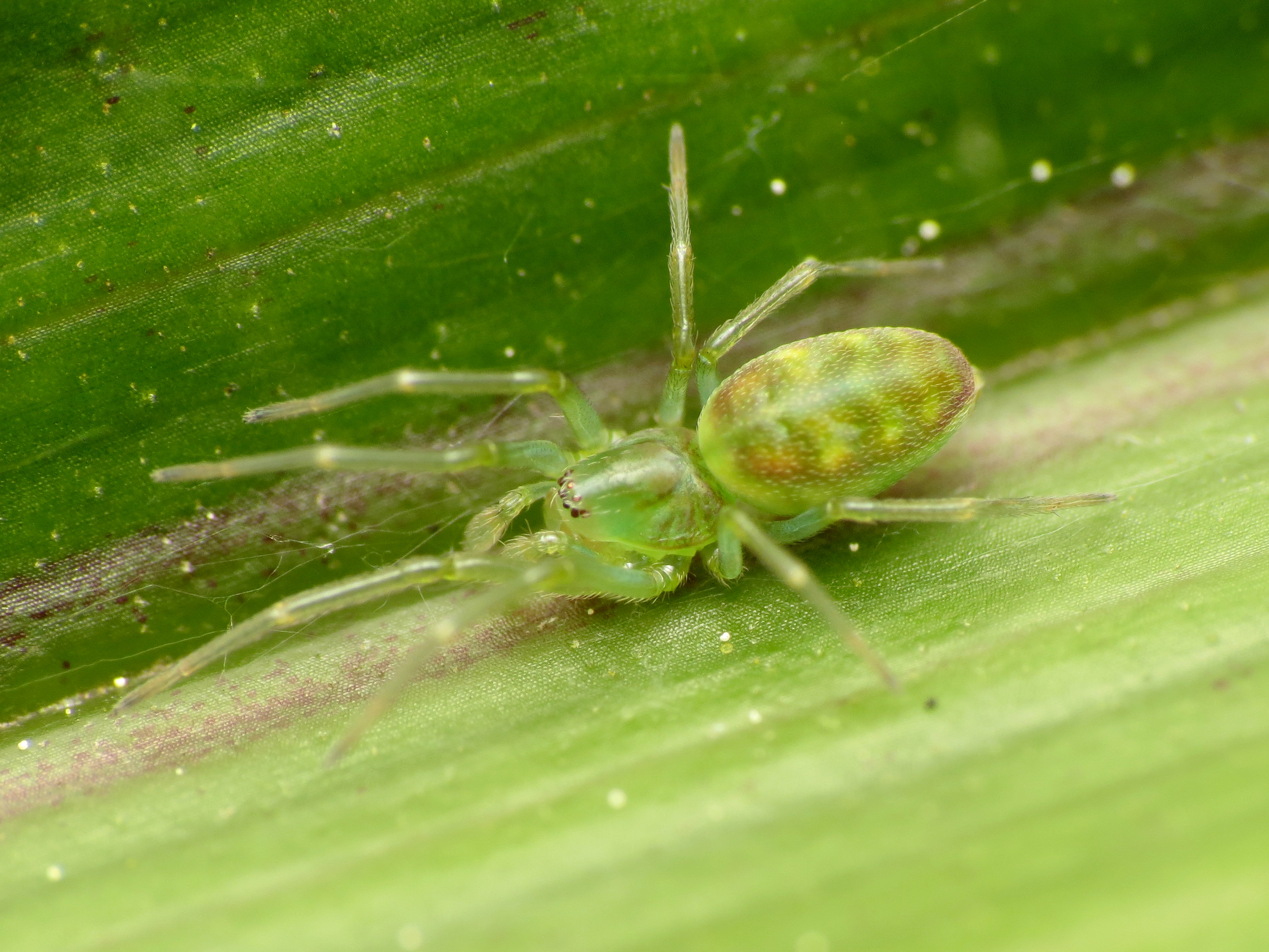

Conservation status
- Data Deficit (NZ TCS)

Scientific classification
- Kingdom: Animalia
- Phylum: Arthropoda
- Subphylum: Chelicerata
- Class: Arachnida
- Order: Araneae
- Infraorder: Araneomorphae
- Family: Dictynidae
- Genus: Paradictyna
- Species: P. ilamia

Binomial name
- Paradictyna ilamia Forster, 1970

= Paradictyna ilamia =

Species of spider

Paradictyna ilamia is a species of Dictynidae spider that is endemic to New Zealand.

== Taxonomy ==
This species was described in 1970 by Ray Forster from female specimens collected in Riccarton Bush. The holotype is stored in Otago Museum.

== Description ==
The female is recorded at 1.95mm in length. In life, the spider is green with a reddish brown patch on the dorsal surface of the abdomen.

== Distribution ==
This species is only known from Riccarton Bush in Christchurch, New Zealand.

== Conservation status ==
Under the New Zealand Threat Classification System, this species is listed as "Data Deficient" with the qualifiers of "Data Poor: Size", "Data Poor: Trend" and "One Location".
