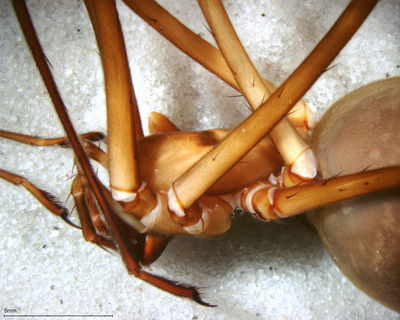

Scientific classification
- Kingdom: Animalia
- Phylum: Arthropoda
- Subphylum: Chelicerata
- Class: Arachnida
- Order: Araneae
- Infraorder: Araneomorphae
- Family: Gradungulidae
- Genus: Macrogradungula; Gray, 1987
- Species: M. moonya

Binomial name
- Macrogradungula moonya Gray, 1987

= Macrogradungula =

Genus of spiders

Macrogradungula is a monotypic genus of Australian large-clawed spiders containing the single species, Macrogradungula moonya. It was first described by Michael R. Gray in 1987, and has only been found in Australia. It is classified under the family Gradungulidae, superfamily Austrochiloidea, and suborder Araneomorphae.

== Distribution ==
Macrogradungula moonya is currently known from three disjunct localities in northeastern Queensland, Australia. The first specimens were recovered from rainforest sink holes in Boulder Creek, Walter Hill Range. Other specimens were reported from caves and cavities among boulder fields in the mountains of the Kalkajaka National Park and Mount Bartle Frere. It is unknown if these other populations may represent new species.
