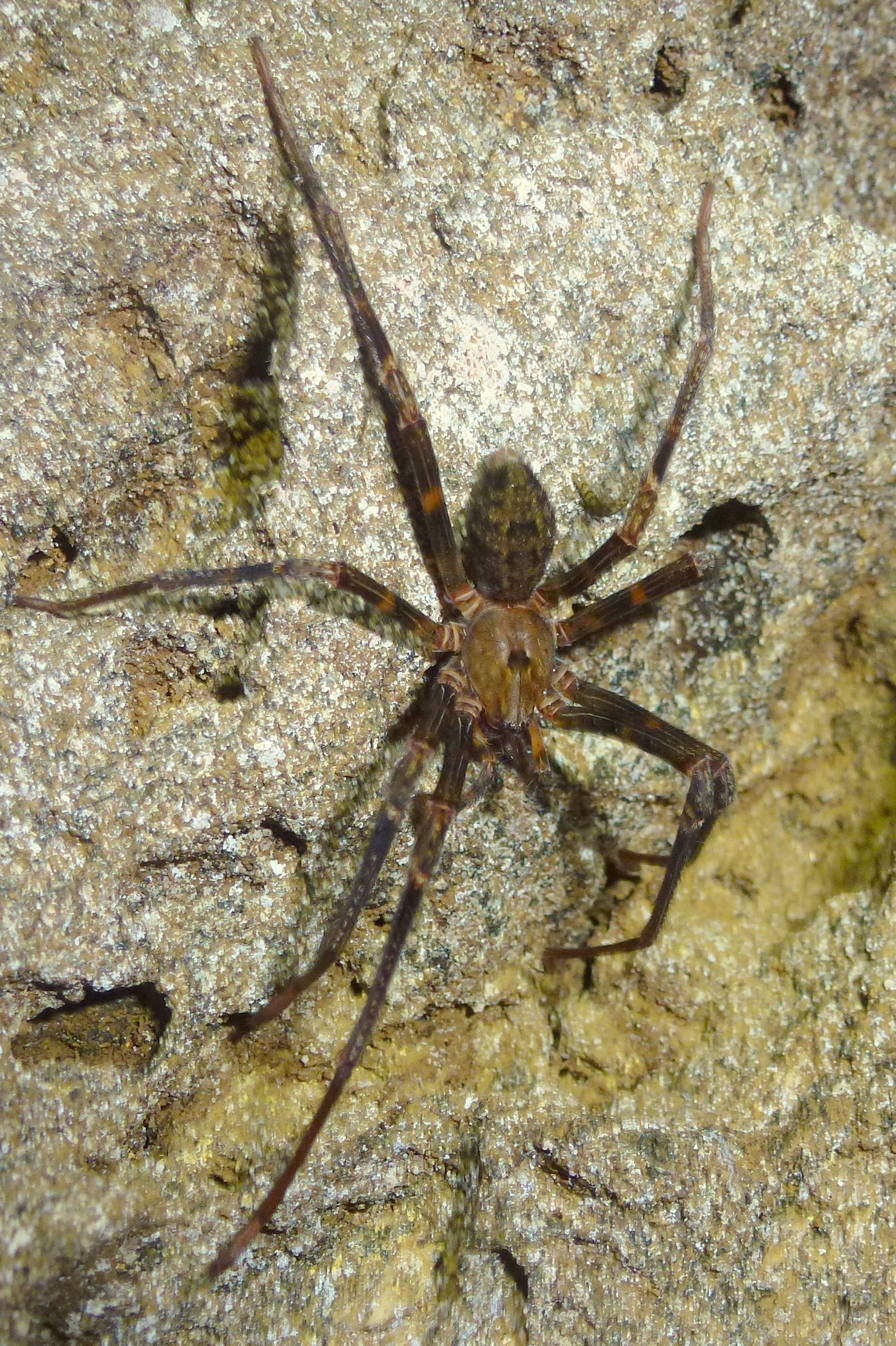
- Nelson cave spider, Oparara basin, Karamea, New Zealand

Conservation status
- Range Restricted (NZ TCS)

Scientific classification
- Kingdom: Animalia
- Phylum: Arthropoda
- Subphylum: Chelicerata
- Class: Arachnida
- Order: Araneae
- Infraorder: Araneomorphae
- Family: Gradungulidae
- Genus: Spelungula; Forster, 1987
- Species: S. cavernicola

Binomial name
- Spelungula cavernicola Forster, 1987

= Spelungula =

Genus of spiders

Spelungula is a monotypic genus of South Pacific large-clawed spiders containing the single species, Spelungula cavernicola, or the Nelson cave spider.

== Taxonomy ==
This species was described in 1987 by Ray Forster from specimens collected in caves around Nelson. The holotype is stored at Te Papa Museum under registration number AS.000014.

== Etymology ==
The genus name is derived from "spelunca", which is latin for cave and is feminine in gender. The species name "cavernicola" refers to the species restriction to caves.

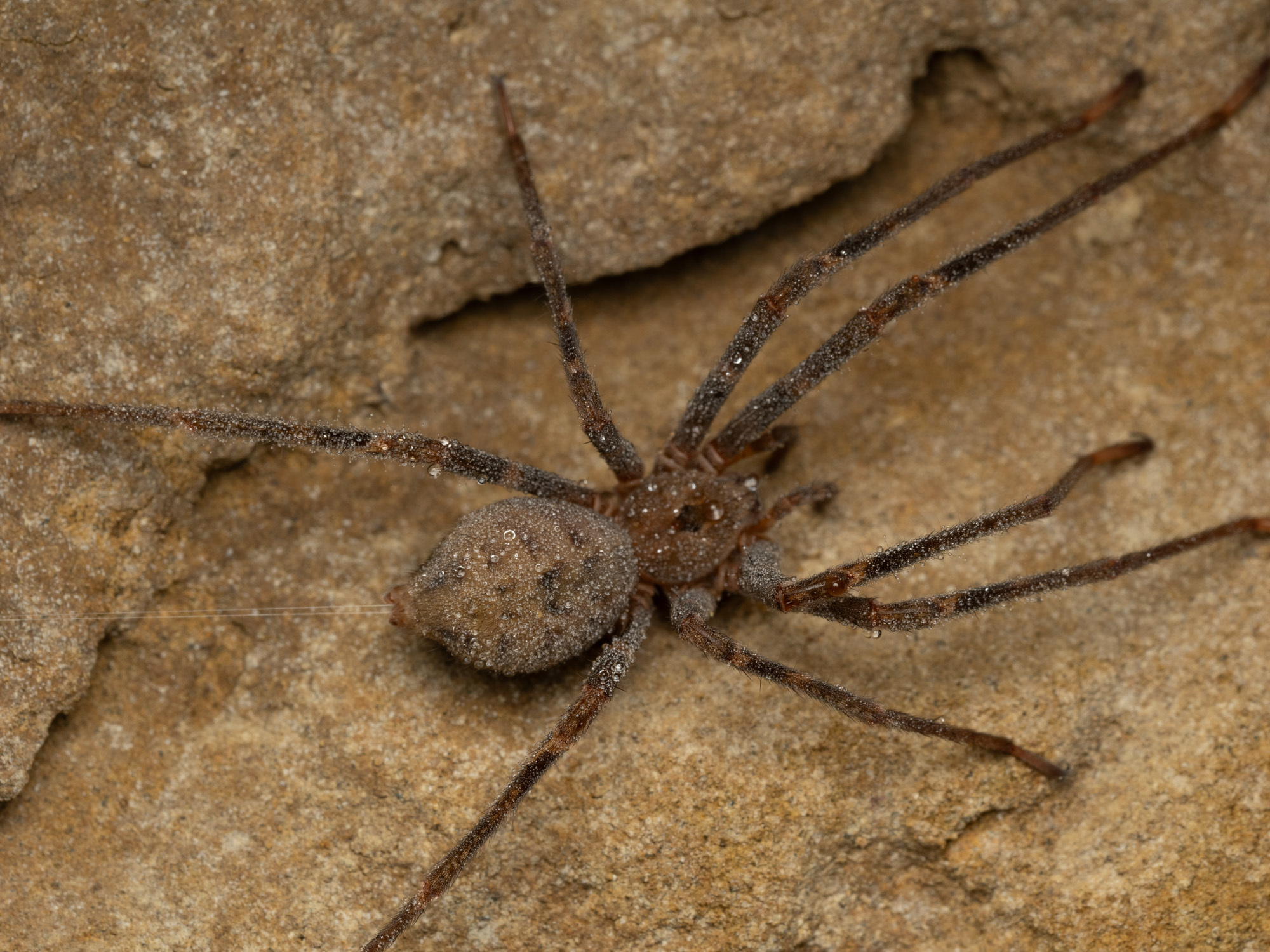

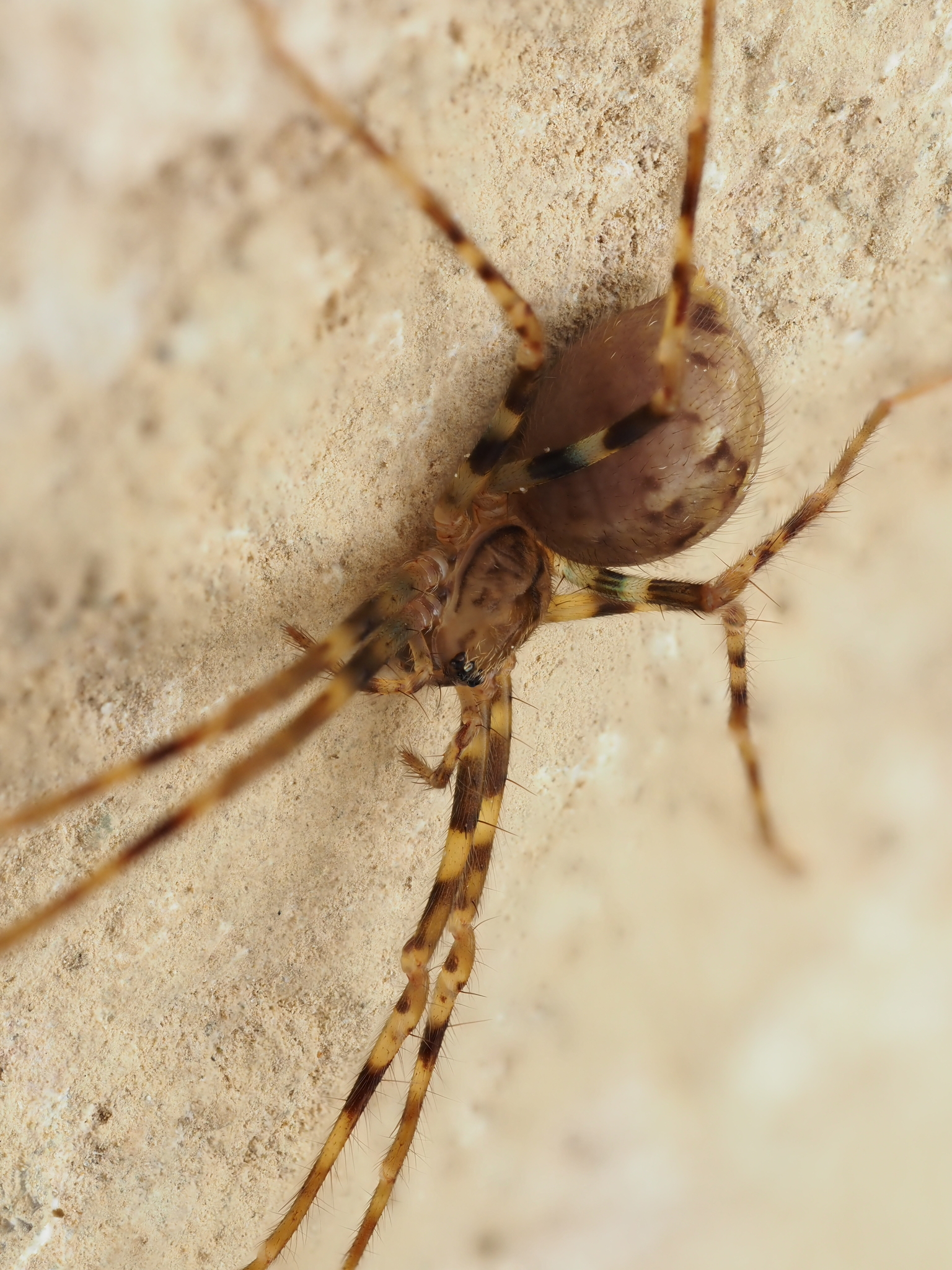

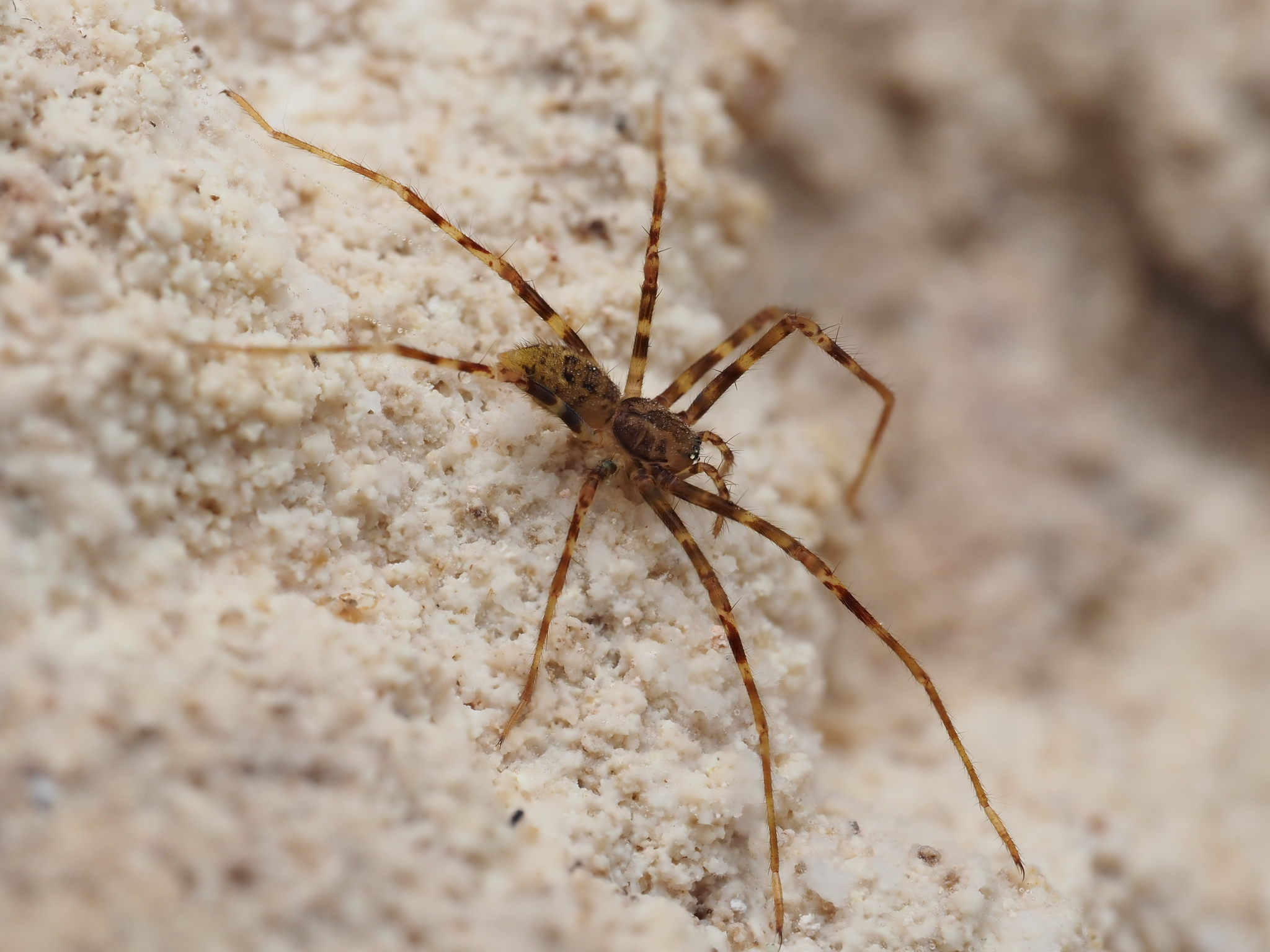

== Description ==
It is New Zealand's largest known spider, with a leg span of 13 to 15 centimetres (5.1 to 5.9 in) and a body length of 2.4 centimetres (0.94 in), and its main prey is cave weta.

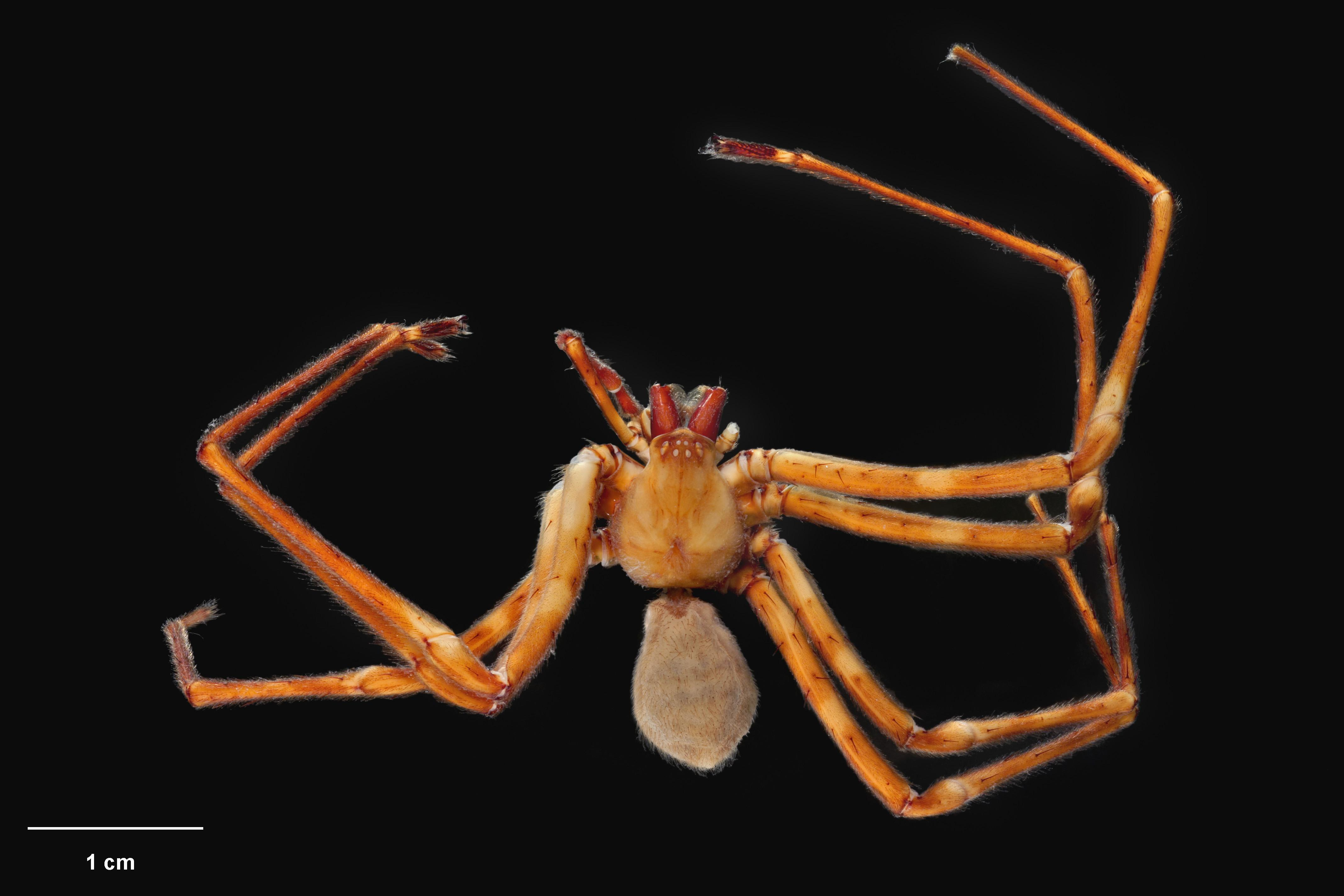
Holotype of Spelungula cavernicola

== Distribution/habitat ==
This species is only known from caves in northwestern Nelson, New Zealand.

== Conservation status ==
It is one of the few spider species afforded legal protection under the New Zealand Wildlife Act. It is classified as "Range Restricted" and stable in the New Zealand Threat Classification System.

In May 2022, the Crazy Paving Cave in Kahurangi National Park, where the spiders are known to breed, was closed for a year in an attempt to help the population to recover.

== See also ==
- Spiders of New Zealand
