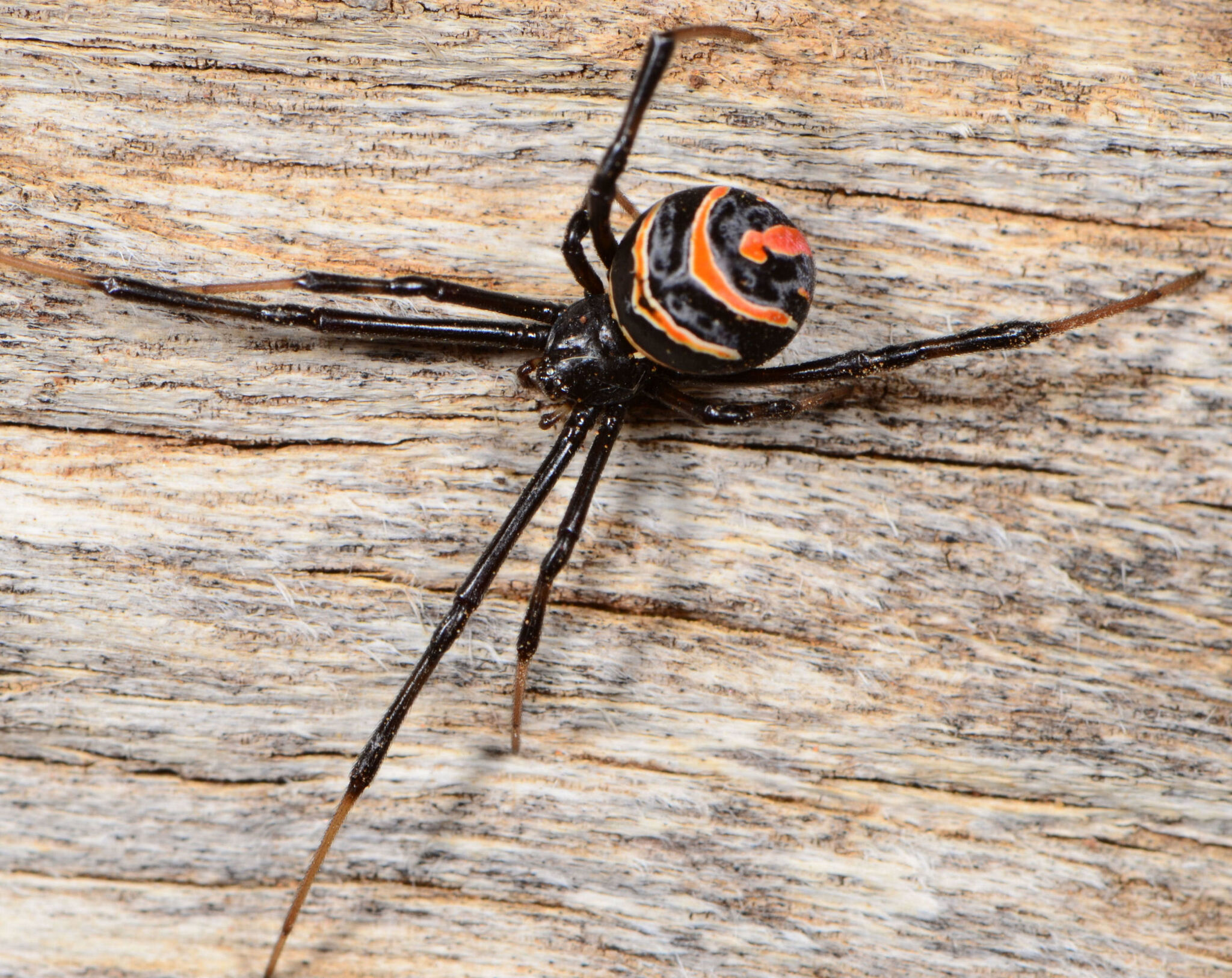
- Female
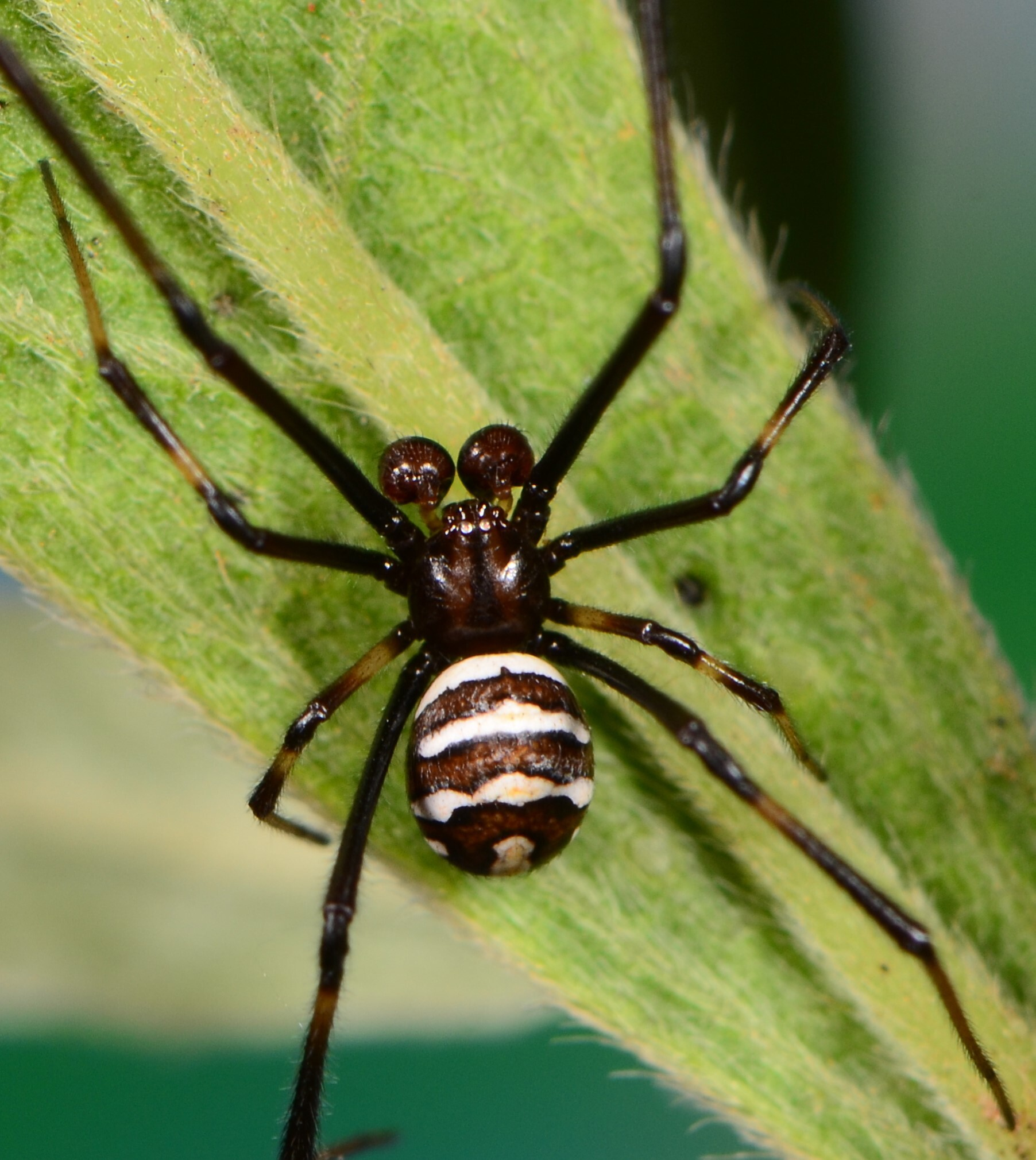
- Male

Scientific classification
- Kingdom: Animalia
- Phylum: Arthropoda
- Subphylum: Chelicerata
- Class: Arachnida
- Order: Araneae
- Infraorder: Araneomorphae
- Family: Theridiidae
- Genus: Latrodectus
- Species: L. renivulvatus

Binomial name
- Latrodectus renivulvatus Dahl, 1902

Synonyms
- Latrodectus incertus Lawrence, 1927; Latrodectus mactans Lotz, 1994; Latrodectus hasselti Al-Hadlak & Najim, 2015

= Latrodectus renivulvatus =

Central Button Spider

Species of spider

Latrodectus renivulvatus is a species of spider in the family Theridiidae, found in Africa, Saudi Arabia and Yemen. It is one of six species of Latrodectus found in southern Africa, four of which, including L. renivulvatus, are known as black button or black widow spiders. Like all Latrodectus species, L. renivulvatus has a neurotoxic venom. It acts on nerve endings, causing the very unpleasant symptoms of latrodectism when humans are bitten.

== Distribution ==
Latrodectus renivulvatus is found in Saint Helena, Saudi Arabia, Yemen, Iraq, and throughout Africa including Botswana, Ethiopia, Kenya, Lesotho, Namibia, Senegal, Rwanda, Tanzania, Zimbabwe, and South Africa.

In South Africa, the species has been sampled from all nine provinces. Notable locations include Golden Gate Highlands National Park, Kruger National Park, and Karoo National Park.

== Habitat and ecology ==
The web is usually constructed close to the ground, seldom higher than half a meter. The refuge is in a tuft of grass or in a low shrub, in an empty burrow, or under a loose stone. The species is sometimes found in houses in Gauteng and the Free State.

Latrodectus renivulvatus inhabits a large range at altitudes from 47 to 2020 m above sea level. The species has been sampled from the Grassland, Nama Karoo, Savanna, and Succulent Karoo biomes and is frequently sampled from crops including cotton, maize, strawberries, sugarcane, and vineyards.

== Description ==
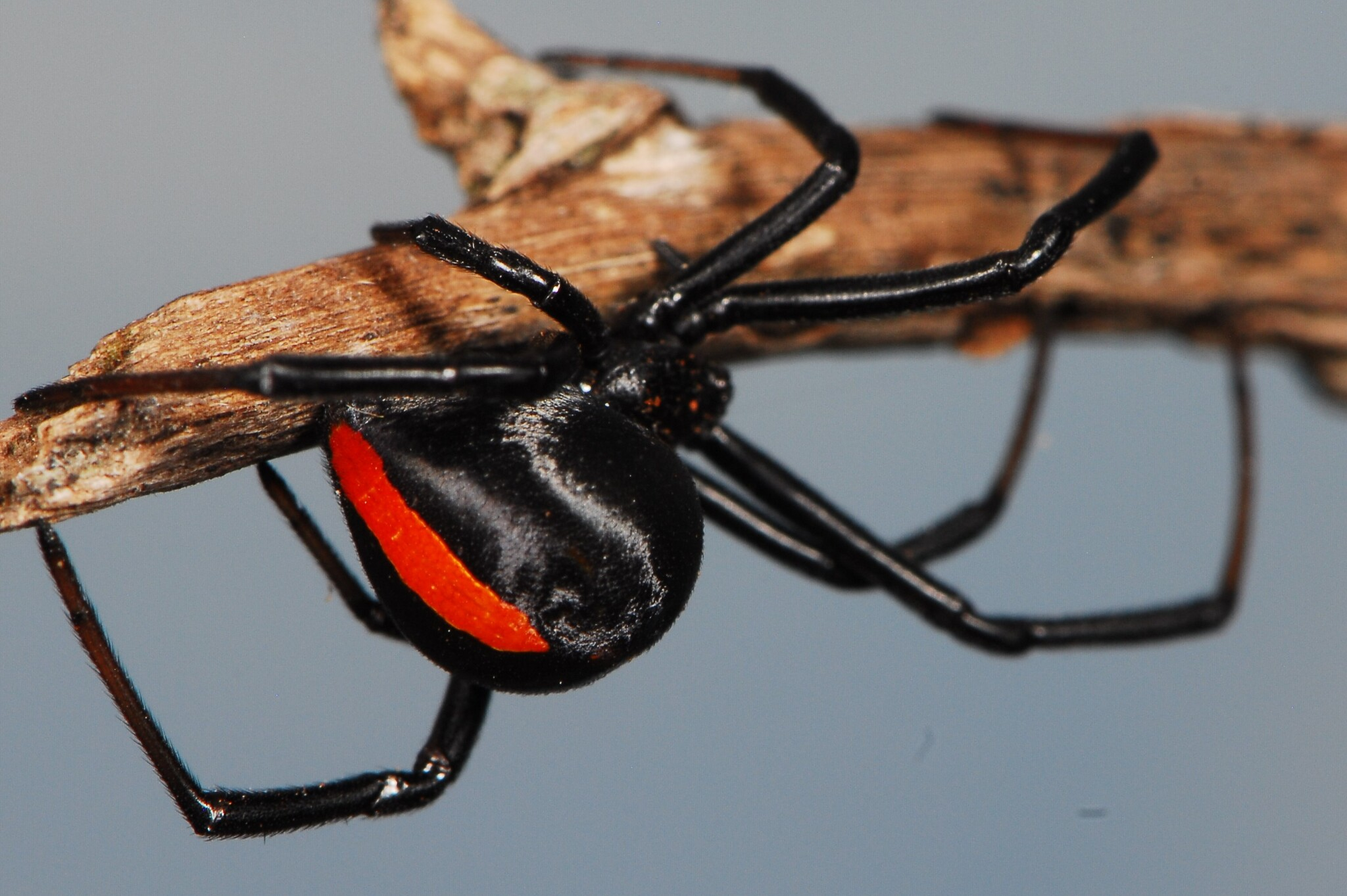
female

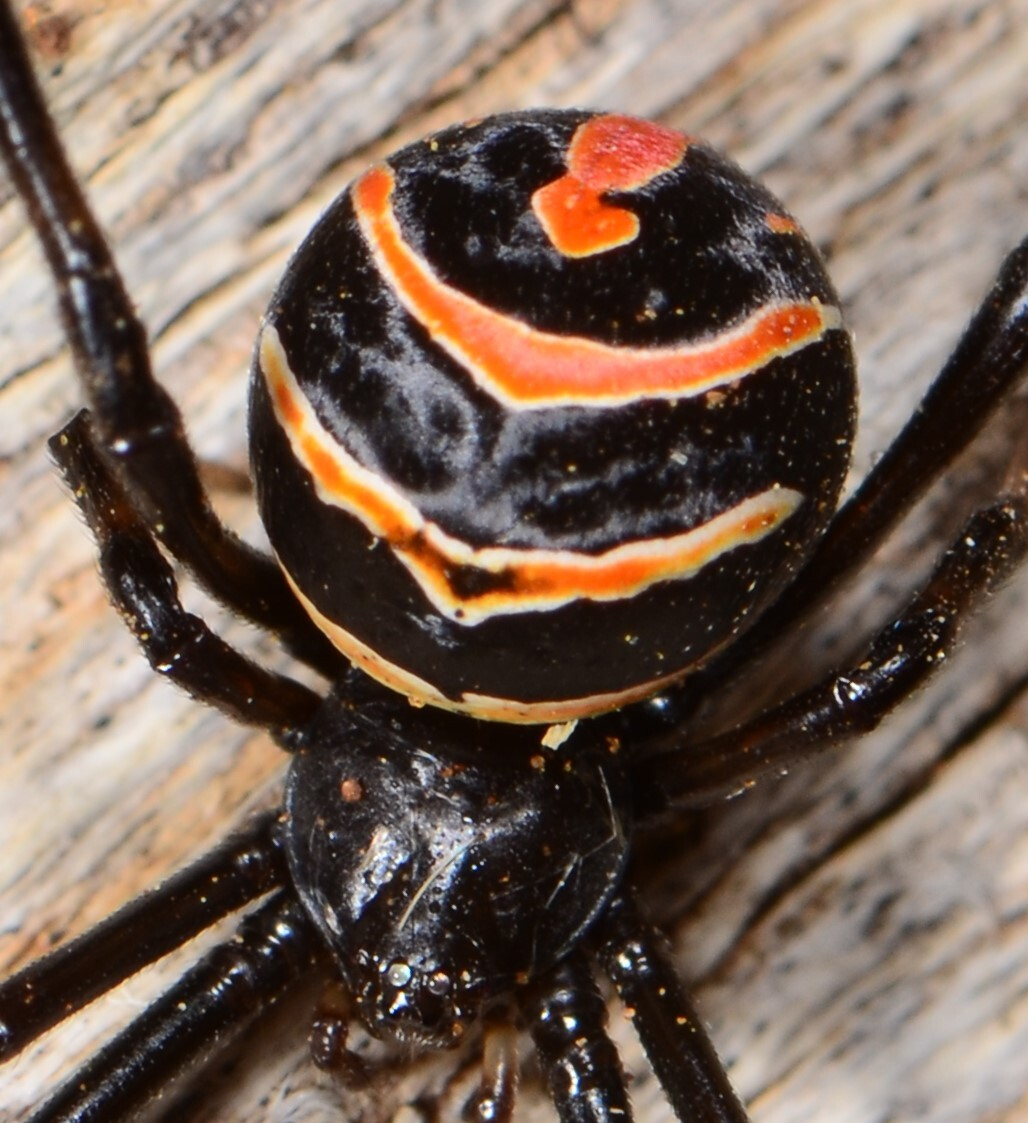
female

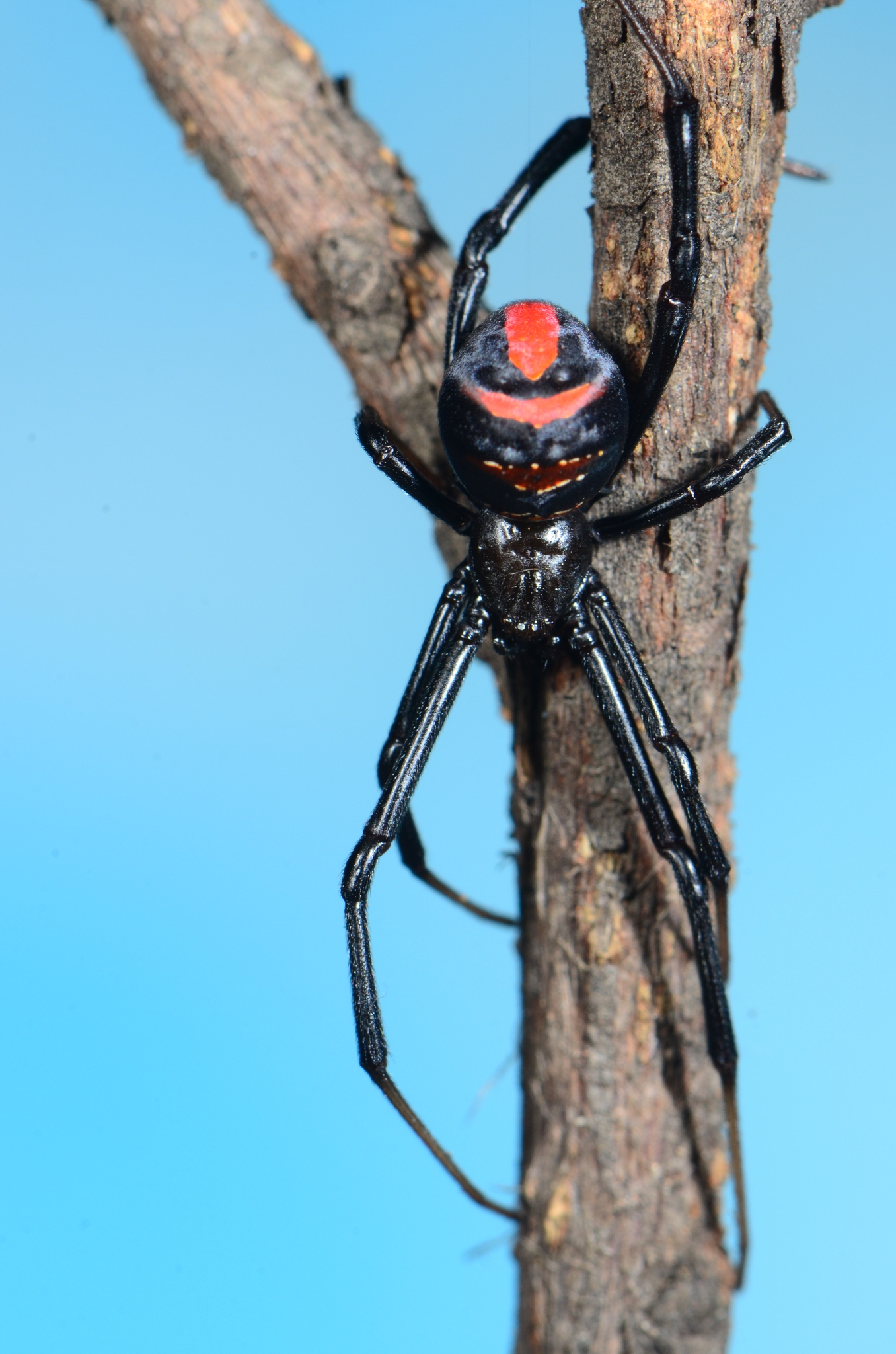
female

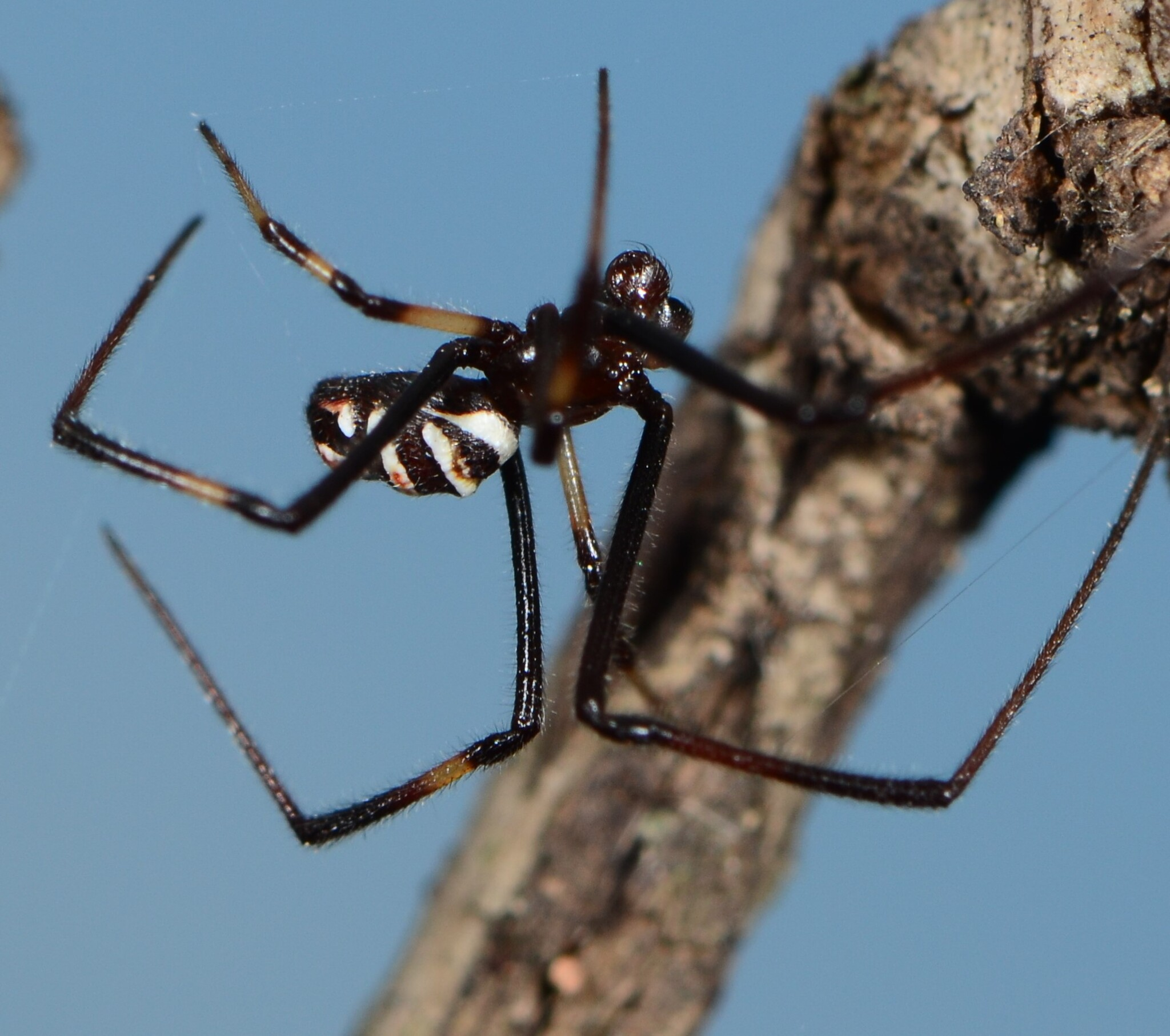
male

== Conservation ==
Latrodectus renivulvatus is listed as Least Concern by the South African National Biodiversity Institute due to its wide geographical range. The species has been sampled from more than ten protected areas.

== Taxonomy ==
The species was revised by Lotz in 1994.
