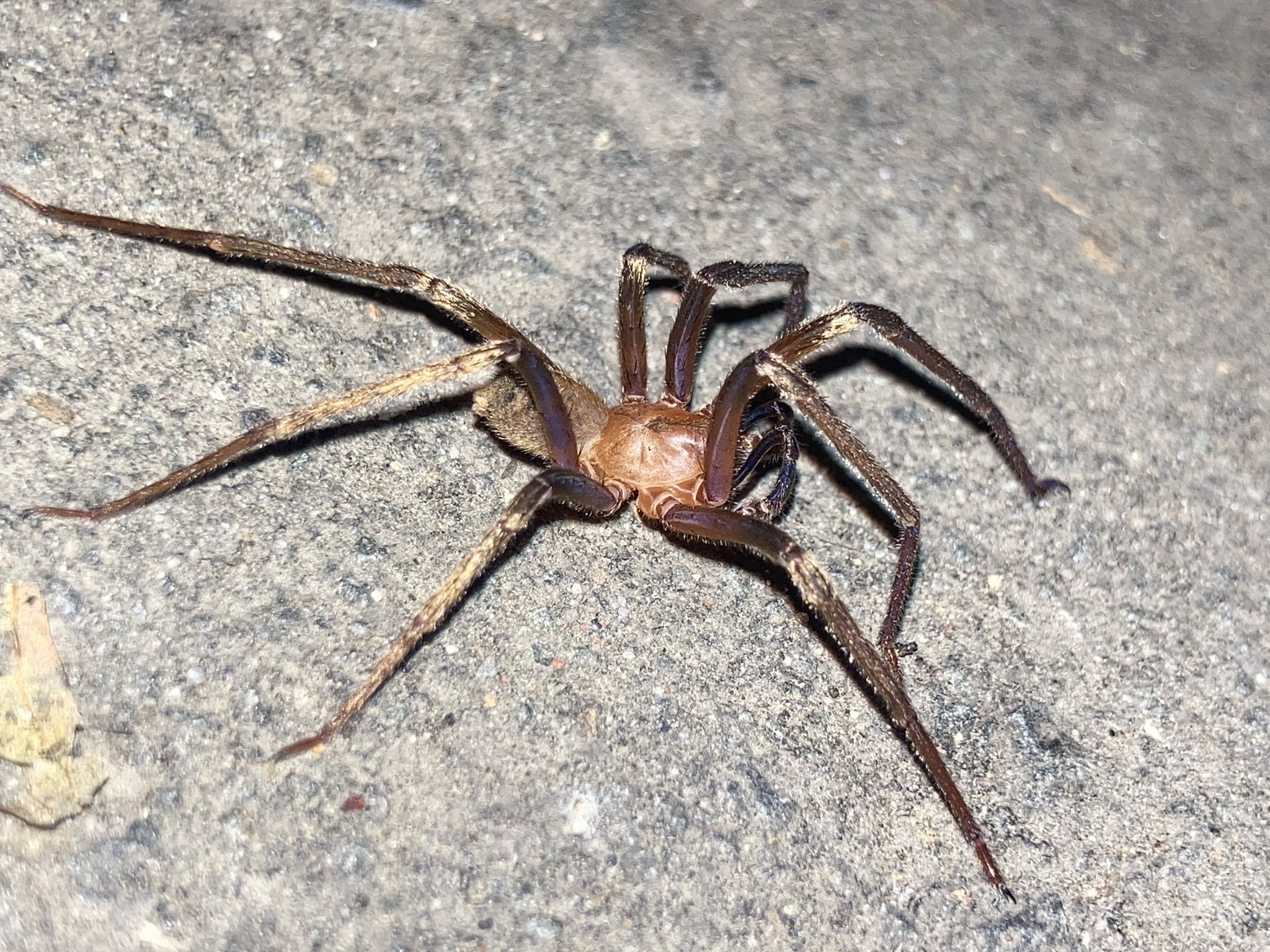

Scientific classification
- Kingdom: Animalia
- Phylum: Arthropoda
- Subphylum: Chelicerata
- Class: Arachnida
- Order: Araneae
- Infraorder: Araneomorphae
- Family: Gradungulidae
- Genus: Kaiya; Gray, 1987

Type species
- K. terama Gray, 1987

Species
- 4, see text

= Kaiya =

Genus of spiders

Kaiya is a genus of Australian large-clawed spiders that was first described by Raymond Robert Forster, Norman I. Platnick & Michael R. Gray in 1987.

== Species ==
As of October 2025, this genus includes four species:

- Kaiya bemboka Gray, 1987 – Australia (New South Wales)
- Kaiya brindabella (Moran, 1985) – Australian Capital Territory
- Kaiya parnabyi Gray, 1987 – Australia (Victoria)
- Kaiya terama Gray, 1987 – Australia (New South Wales) (type species)
