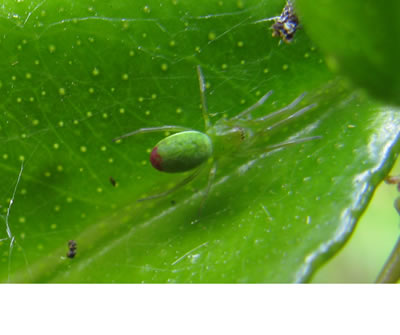
- P. rufoflava

Scientific classification
- Domain: Eukaryota
- Kingdom: Animalia
- Phylum: Arthropoda
- Subphylum: Chelicerata
- Class: Arachnida
- Order: Araneae
- Infraorder: Araneomorphae
- Family: Dictynidae
- Genus: Paradictyna; Forster, 1970

Type species
- P. rufoflava (Chamberlain, 1946)

Species
- P. ilamia Forster, 1970 – New Zealand; P. rufoflava (Chamberlain, 1946) – New Zealand

= Paradictyna =

Genus of spiders

Paradictyna is a genus of South Pacific cribellate araneomorph spiders in the family Dictynidae, and was first described by Raymond Robert Forster in 1970. As of May 2019 it contains only two species, both found in New Zealand: P. ilamia and P. rufoflava.
