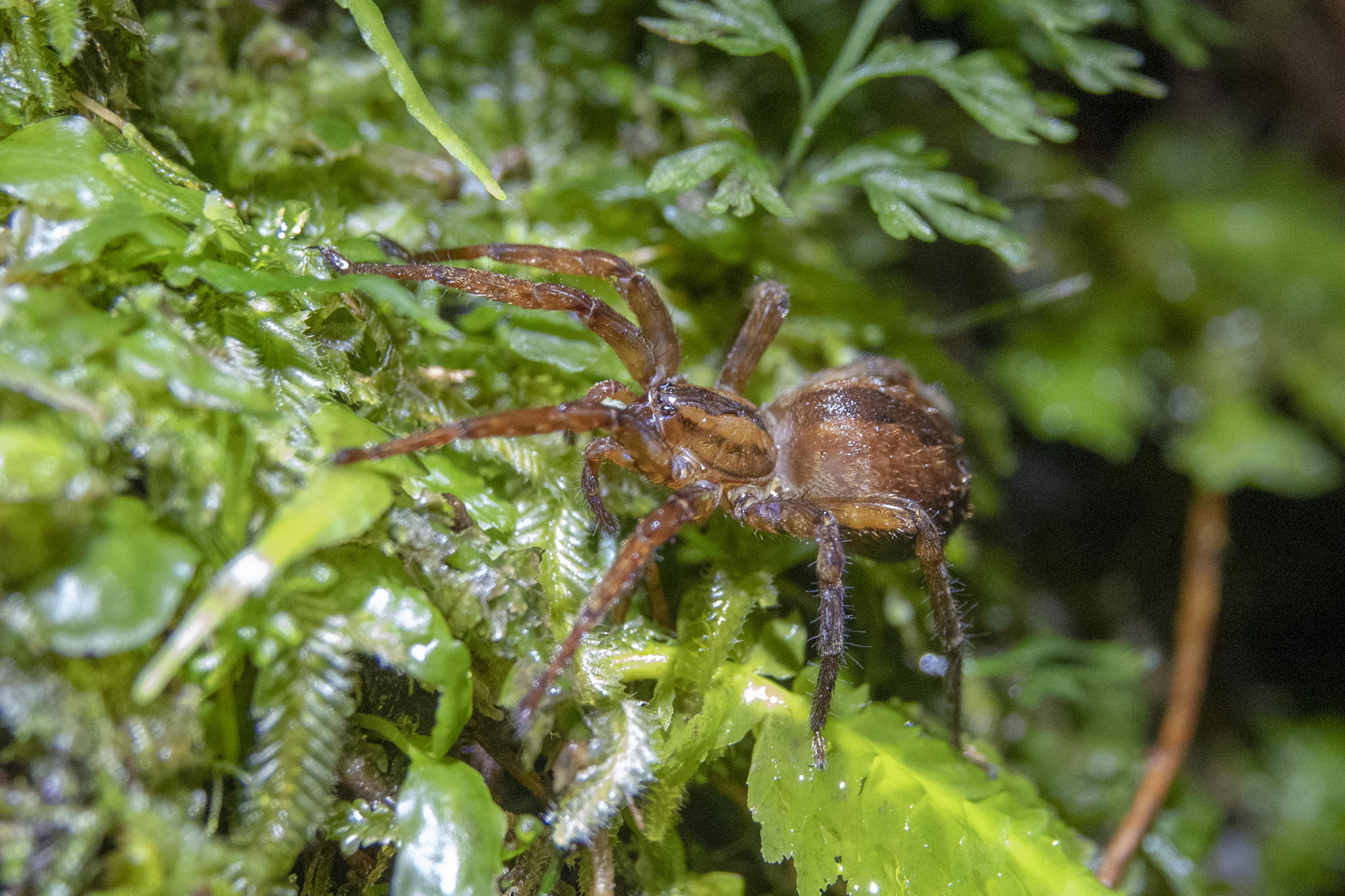
- Gradungula sorenseni

Scientific classification
- Kingdom: Animalia
- Phylum: Arthropoda
- Subphylum: Chelicerata
- Class: Arachnida
- Order: Araneae
- Infraorder: Araneomorphae
- Family: Gradungulidae; Forster, 1955

Diversity
- 8 genera, 18 species
- blue: reported countries (WSC) green: observation hotspots (iNaturalist)

= Gradungulidae =

Large-clawed spiders

Family of spiders

Gradungulidae, also known as large-clawed spiders, is a spider family endemic to Australia and New Zealand. They are medium to large-sized haplogyne spiders with three claws and two pairs of book-lungs similar to Mygalomorphae.

Some species build extensive webs with an upper retreat tangle and connecting threads to scaffolding. This supports the ladder-like catching platform that is glued to the ground.

Hickmania, Progradungula (a large spider with long legs like Hickmania,), and Macrogradungula are the only cribellate genera of the family.

== Species ==
As of October 2025, this family includes eight genera and eighteen species:

Gradungula Gertsch, 1958

- Gradungula sorenseni Forster, 1955 — New Zealand

Hickmania Forster, 1955

- Hickmania troglodytes (Higgins & Petterd, 1883) — Tasmania

Kaiya Gray, 1987

- Kaiya bemboka Gray, 1987 — New South Wales
- Kaiya brindabella (Moran, 1985) — Australian Capital Territory
- Kaiya parnabyi Gray, 1987 — Victoria
- Kaiya terama Gray, 1987 (type species) — New South Wales

Macrogradungula Gray, 1987

- Macrogradungula moonya Gray, 1987 — Queensland

Pianoa Forster, 1987

- Pianoa isolata Forster, 1987 — New Zealand

Progradungula Forster & Gray, 1979

- Progradungula barringtonensis Michalik & Smith, 2024 – Australia (New South Wales)
- Progradungula carraiensis Forster & Gray, 1979 – Australia (New South Wales) (type species)
- Progradungula otwayensis Milledge, 1997 – Australia (Victoria)

Spelungula Forster, 1987

- Spelungula cavernicola Forster, 1987 — New Zealand

Tarlina Gray, 1987

- Tarlina daviesae Gray, 1987 — Queensland
- Tarlina milledgei Gray, 1987 — New South Wales
- Tarlina noorundi Gray, 1987 (type species) — New South Wales
- Tarlina simipes Gray, 1987 — Queensland
- Tarlina smithersi Gray, 1987 — New South Wales
- Tarlina woodwardi (Forster, 1955) — Queensland
