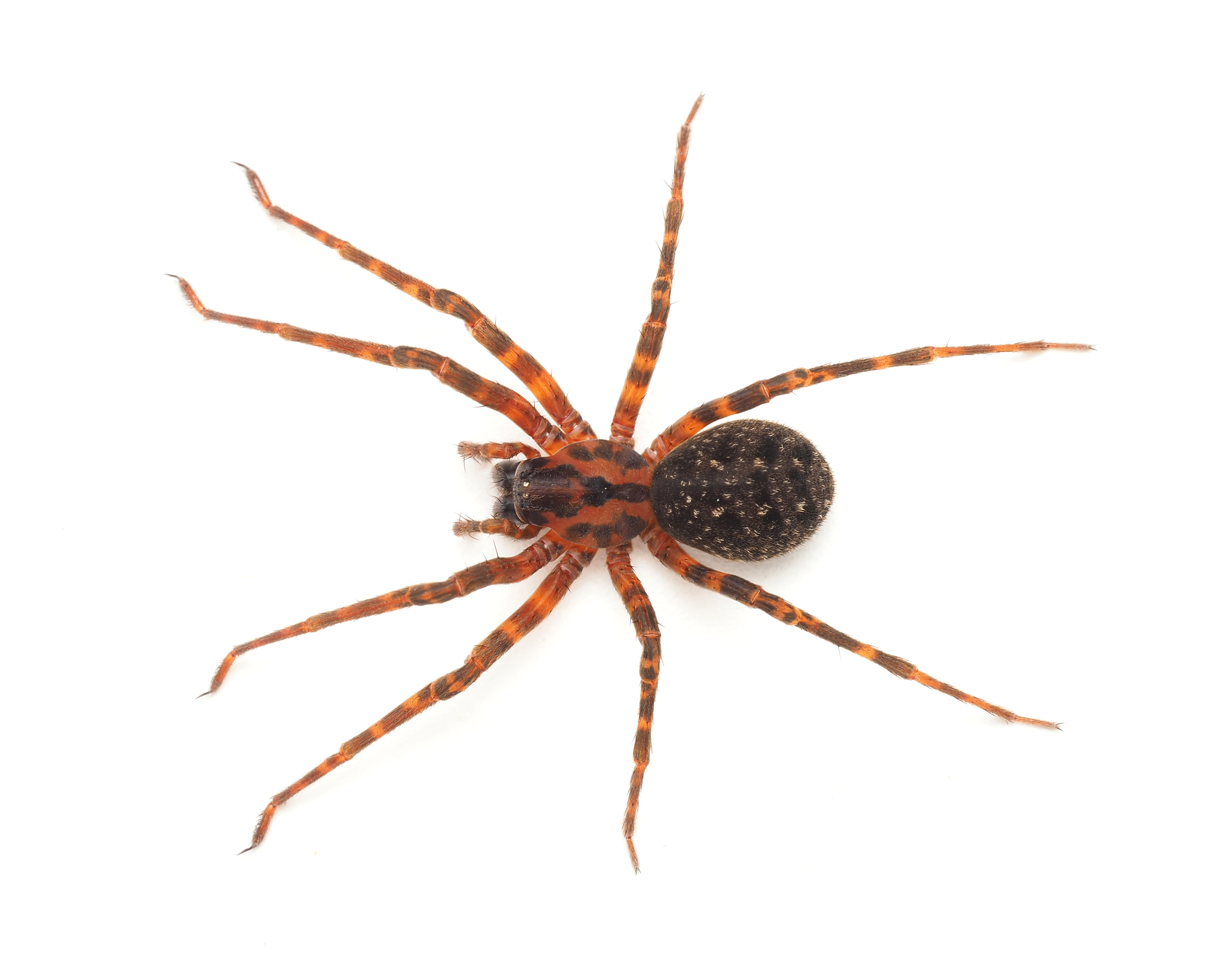
- T. woodwardi
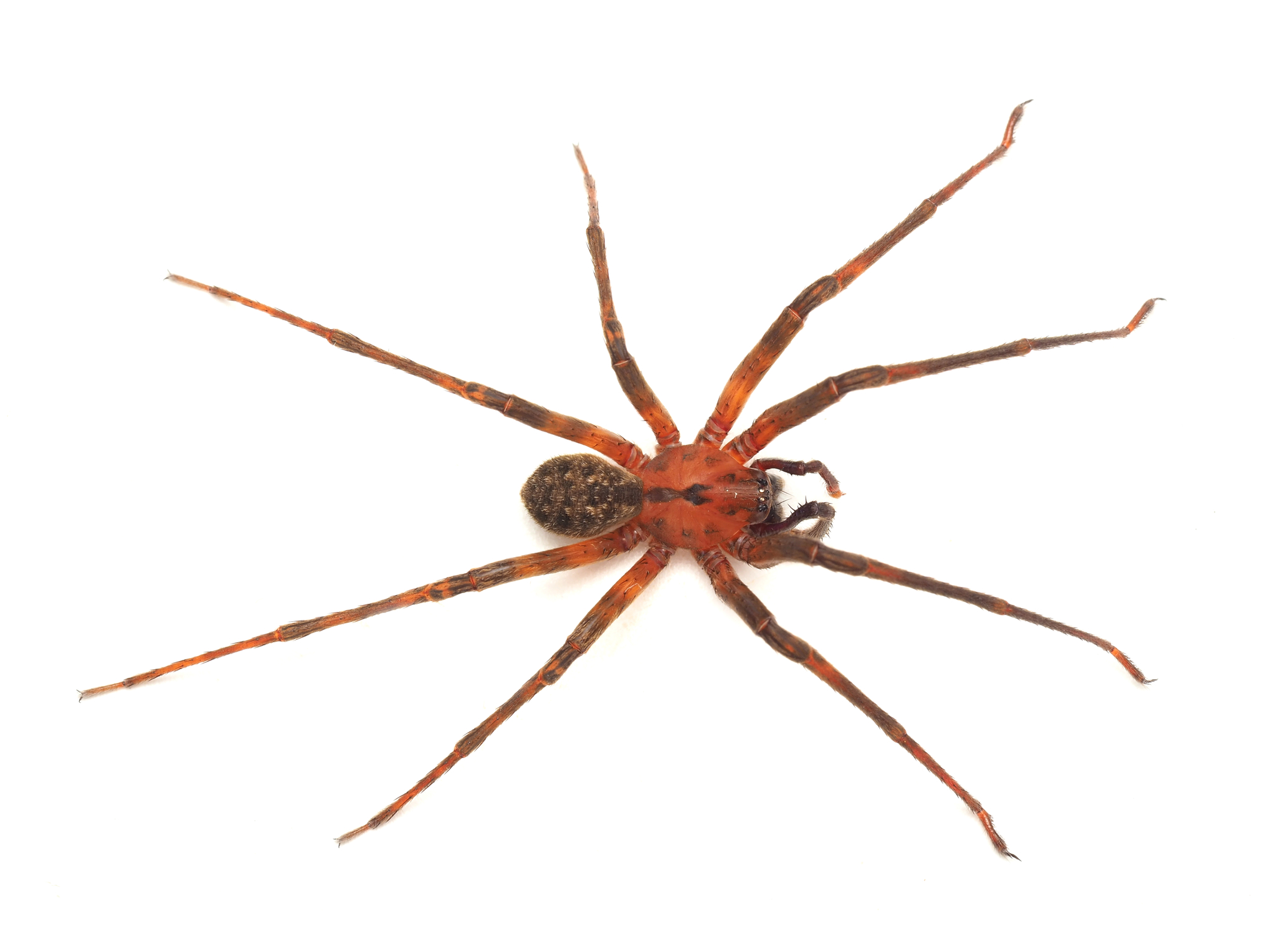
- T. woodwardi

Scientific classification
- Kingdom: Animalia
- Phylum: Arthropoda
- Subphylum: Chelicerata
- Class: Arachnida
- Order: Araneae
- Infraorder: Araneomorphae
- Family: Gradungulidae
- Genus: Tarlina; Gray, 1987

Type species
- T. noorundi Gray, 1987

Species
- 6, see text

= Tarlina =

Genus of spiders

Tarlina is a genus of Australian large-clawed spiders that was first described by Raymond Robert Forster, Norman I. Platnick & Michael R. Gray in 1987.

== Species ==
As of October 2025, this genus includes six species:

- Tarlina daviesae Gray, 1987 – Australia (Queensland)
- Tarlina milledgei Gray, 1987 – Australia (New South Wales)
- Tarlina noorundi Gray, 1987 – Australia (New South Wales) (type species)
- Tarlina simipes Gray, 1987 – Australia (Queensland)
- Tarlina smithersi Gray, 1987 – Australia (New South Wales)
- Tarlina woodwardi (Forster, 1955) – Australia (Queensland)
