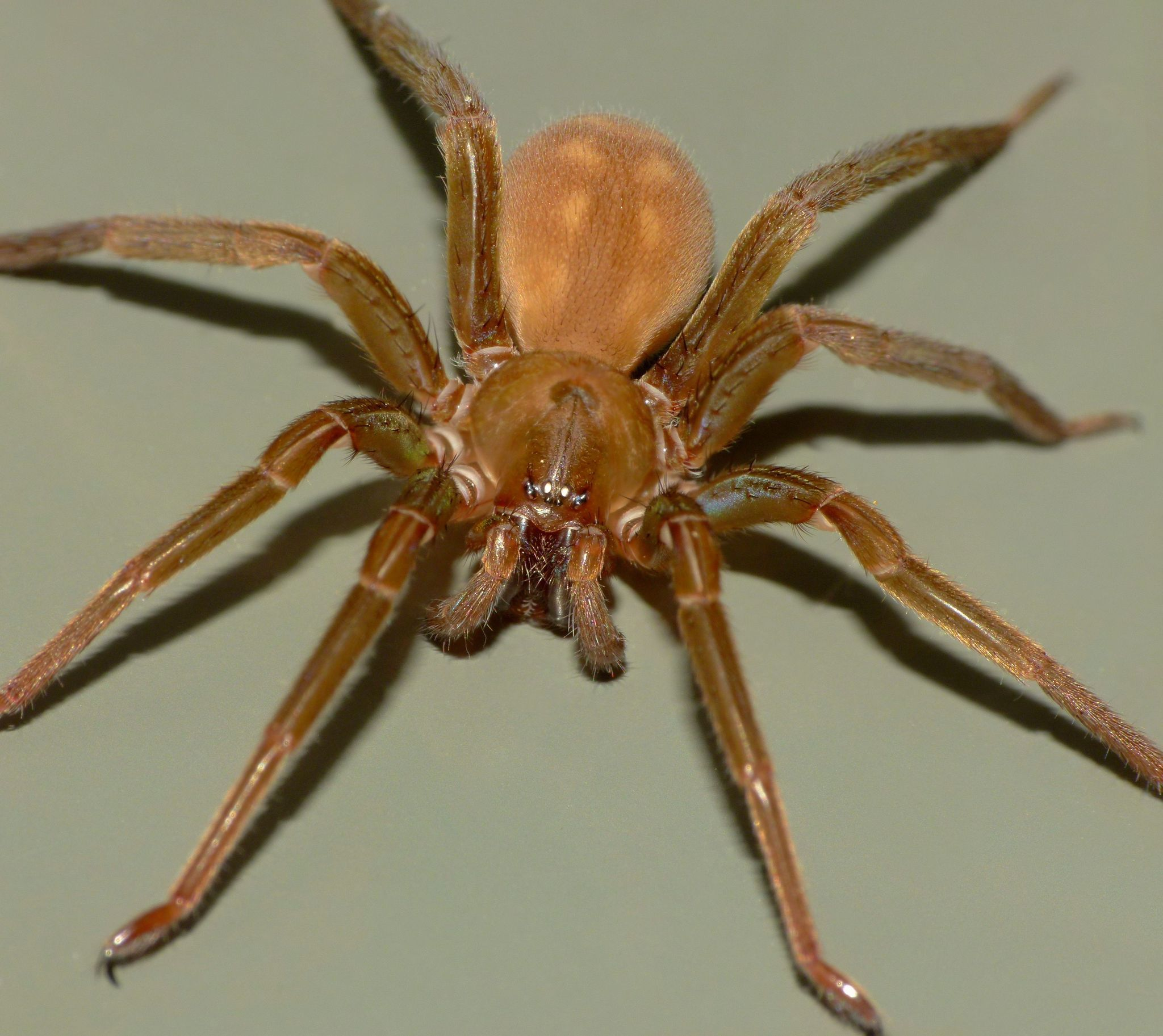

Scientific classification
- Kingdom: Animalia
- Phylum: Arthropoda
- Subphylum: Chelicerata
- Class: Arachnida
- Order: Araneae
- Infraorder: Araneomorphae
- Family: Gradungulidae
- Genus: Pianoa; Forster, 1987
- Species: P. isolata

Binomial name
- Pianoa isolata Forster, 1987

= Pianoa =

Genus of spiders

Pianoa is a monotypic genus of large-clawed spiders endemic to New Zealand. It contains a single species, Pianoa isolata, known commonly as the piano flat spider.

It was first described by Raymond Robert Forster, Norman I. Platnick & Michael R. Gray in 1987.

== Distribution ==
The piano flat spider is found throughout the Waikaia Forest and at other locations in northern Southland and west Otago.

== Description ==
Juveniles are pale white with no markings, but develop pigmentation after several molts.

Egg sacs are pale cream or white in colour.

== Habitat ==
P. isolata has been observed living in leaf litter and rotting logs on the forest floor.

== Behaviour and diet ==
The piano flat spider is nocturnal. It is an active hunter and does not build a web, instead using a large claw on the end of its first and second legs to seize prey, which it bites repeatedly.

Egg-sacs are laid in the cavities of fallen logs in late spring to early summer. After three to four weeks, juveniles emerge from a small hole at the base of the egg-sac.

== Conservation ==
The piano flat spider is classified as At Risk (Relict) by the Department of Conservation.
