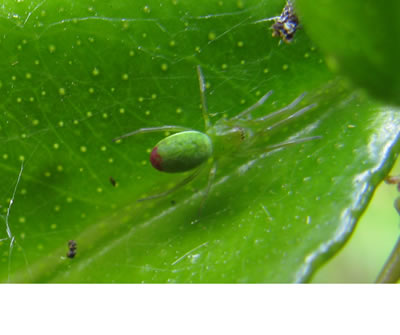

Conservation status
- Not Threatened (NZ TCS)

Scientific classification
- Kingdom: Animalia
- Phylum: Arthropoda
- Subphylum: Chelicerata
- Class: Arachnida
- Order: Araneae
- Infraorder: Araneomorphae
- Family: Dictynidae
- Genus: Paradictyna
- Species: P. rufoflava

Binomial name
- Paradictyna rufoflava Chamberlain, 1946

Synonyms
- Matachia rufoflavus Matachia rufoflava Callevophthalmus rufoflavus

= Paradictyna rufoflava =

Species of spider

Paradictyna rufoflava is a spider of the genus Paradictyna endemic to New Zealand. It is a cribellate (hackled band-producing) spider of the family Dictynidae.

== Taxonomy ==
This species was described as Matachia rufoflavus in 1946 by George Chamberlain from specimens collected on Waiheke Island. In 1967, it was moved to the Callevophthalmus genus. It was most recently revised by Ray Forster in 1970, who transferred it to the Paradictyna genus, of which it is the type species. The holotype is stored in Auckland War Memorial Museum.

== Description ==
The male is recorded at 3mm in length whereas the female is 3.3mm. When alive, this species is green with a reddish patch on the abdomen.

== Distribution ==
This species is known from throughout the North Island of New Zealand. It is usually found in forests.

== Conservation status ==
Under the New Zealand Threat Classification System, this species is listed as "Not Threatened".
