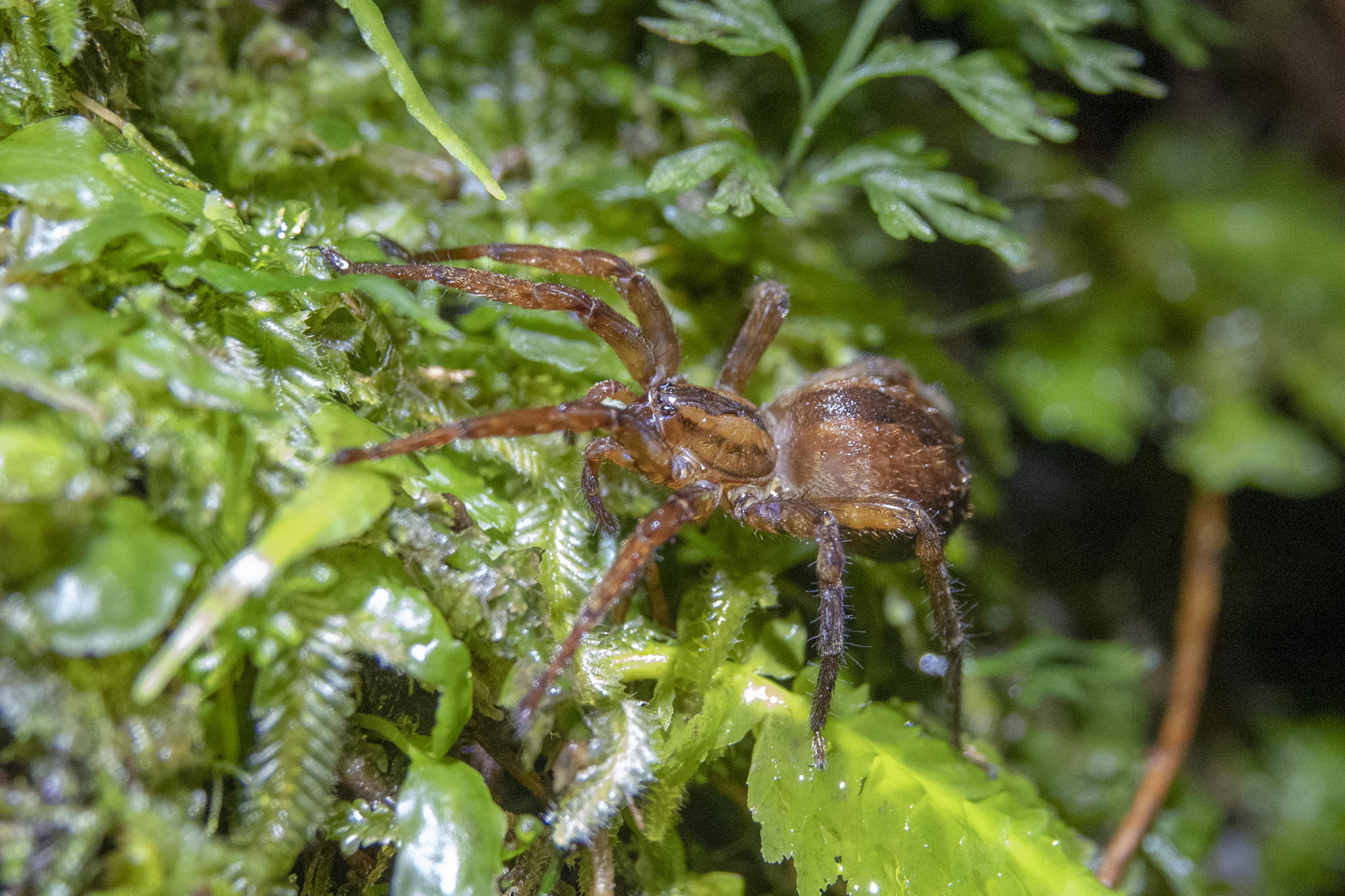
- Gradungula sorenseni

Scientific classification
- Kingdom: Animalia
- Phylum: Arthropoda
- Subphylum: Chelicerata
- Class: Arachnida
- Order: Araneae
- Infraorder: Araneomorphae
- Family: Gradungulidae
- Genus: Gradungula; Forster, 1955
- Species: G. sorenseni

Binomial name
- Gradungula sorenseni Forster, 1955

= Gradungula =

Genus of spiders

Gradungula is a monotypic genus of South Pacific large-clawed spiders containing the single species, Gradungula sorenseni. It is only found in New Zealand.

== Etymology ==
The genus name is derived from Latin gradus "step" and ungula "claw", referring to the enlarged front leg claws of this species. These claws also occur in other species of the family Gradungulidae. The species is named after Jack Sorensen, the discoverer of the species.

== Taxonomy ==
Gradungula sorenseni was first described by Raymond Robert Forster in 1955.

== Distribution ==
Gradungula sorenseni is distributed in forests throughout the western South Island of New Zealand and throughout Stewart Island.
