= List of Calleida species =

This is a list of 301species in Calleida, a genus of ground beetles in the family Carabidae.

== Calleida species ==
- Calleida acutangula (Jeannel, 1949) (Madagascar)
- Calleida aenea Chaudoir, 1873 (Brazil)
- Calleida aeneipennis Buquet, 1835 (French Guiana)
- Calleida aeruginosa Dejean, 1825 (French Guiana)
- Calleida affinis Chaudoir, 1837 (Mozambique, Zimbabwe, and South Africa)
- Calleida alberti (Jeannel, 1949) (Madagascar)
- Calleida alluaudi (Jeannel, 1949) (Madagascar)
- Calleida alticola (Basilewsky, 1951) (Guinea, Ivory Coast, and Cameroon)
- Calleida ambigua Chaudoir, 1873 (Brazil)
- Calleida ambreana (Jeannel, 1949) (Madagascar)
- Calleida amethystina (Fabricius, 1787) (Central and South America)
- Calleida andreae (Jeannel, 1949) (Madagascar)
- Calleida androyana (Jeannel, 1949) (Madagascar)
- Calleida angustata Dejean, 1831 (Africa)
- Calleida angusticollis Boheman, 1848 (Africa)
- Calleida anomala Casale, 2021 (Peru)
- Calleida arrowi Liebke, 1939 (the Lesser Antilles)
- Calleida assimilis (Jeannel, 1949) (Madagascar)
- Calleida aurata Motschulsky, 1864 (Colombia, Panama, and Nicaragua)
- Calleida aureola Bates, 1883 (Guatemala)
- Calleida aurescens Bates, 1883 (Guatemala)
- Calleida auripennis Liebke, 1939 (Ecuador)
- Calleida aurulenta Chaudoir, 1852 (Brazil)
- Calleida baeri (Maindron, 1906)
- Calleida bahamensis Darlington, 1953 (the Lesser Antilles)
- Calleida basalis Putzeys, 1845 (Central and South America)
- Calleida basilewskyi (Casale, 1994) (Malawi)
- Calleida batesi Chaudoir, 1873 (Brazil)
- Calleida bella Chaudoir, 1873 (Costa Rica, Guatemala, Mexico)
- Calleida bicolor Reiche, 1842 (Colombia and Brazil)
- Calleida bogotana Liebke, 1935 (Colombia)
- Calleida borneensis Shi & Casale, 2018 (Malaysia, Indonesia, and Borneo)
- Calleida brunnea Dejean, 1831 (Mexico)
- Calleida bryanti Liebke, 1939 (Brazil and Mexico)
- Calleida buckleyi Liebke, 1939 (Brazil)
- Calleida callithera (Basilewsky, 1962) (Democratic Republic of the Congo)
- Calleida capensis Chaudoir, 1847 (Botswana and South Africa)
- Calleida capreicolor Liebke, 1939 (Brazil)
- Calleida catalai (Jeannel, 1949) (Madagascar)
- Calleida catharinae Liebke, 1939 (Brazil)
- Calleida cavicollis Chaudoir, 1873 (Brazil)
- Calleida cayennensis Chaudoir, 1873 (French Guiana)
- Calleida caymanensis Darlington, 1947 (Cayman Islands)
- Calleida centralis Fairmaire, 1887 (Somalia, Kenya, and Tanzania)
- Calleida championi Bates, 1883 (Panama)
- Calleida chaudoiri Liebke, 1928
- Calleida chevrolati Chaudoir, 1873 (Colombia)
- Calleida chinensis Jedlicka, 1934 (China)
- Calleida chloroptera Dejean, 1831 (China, Japan, Taiwan, Indomalaya)
- Calleida chlorotaenia Bates, 1891 (Mexico)
- Calleida chryseis Bates, 1883 (Guatemala)
- Calleida circumcincta Bates, 1883 (United States and Mexico)
- Calleida clara Chaudoir, 1873 (Venezuela)
- Calleida cochinchinae Casale & Shi, 2018 (Vietnam)
- Calleida congoana (Basilewsky, 1962) (Democratic Republic of the Congo)
- Calleida conica Reiche, 1842 (Colombia)
- Calleida conradsi Basilewsky, 1949 (Rwanda, Burundi, and Tanzania)
- Calleida convexicollis Chaudoir, 1873 (Brazil)
- Calleida cordicollis Putzeys, 1845 (United States, Belize, and Mexico)
- Calleida corporaali Andrewes, 1929 (Malaysia, Indonesia, and Borneo)
- Calleida corumbana Liebke, 1939 (Brazil)
- Calleida cuprea Chaudoir, 1873 (Colombia)
- Calleida cupreocincta Chaudoir, 1848 (Brazil)
- Calleida cupreola Liebke, 1939 (Argentina)
- Calleida cupreolimbata Liebke, 1936 (Argentina)
- Calleida cupreomarginata Chaudoir, 1850 (Bolivia)
- Calleida cupripennis Chaudoir, 1872 (Brazil)
- Calleida cyanescens Brullé, 1837 (Bolivia)
- Calleida cyanipennis Perty, 1830 (Brazil)
- Calleida cyanippe Bates, 1883 (Mexico)
- Calleida davidsoni Casale, 2008 (Ecuador)
- Calleida decellei (Basilewsky, 1968) (Ivory Coast)
- Calleida decolor Chaudoir, 1873 (the Lesser Antilles)
- Calleida decorsei (Jeannel, 1949) (Madagascar)
- Calleida demathani Casale, 2021 (Peru and Brazil)
- Calleida deplanata (Jeannel, 1949) (Madagascar)
- Calleida desenderi Casale, 2011 (Ecuador)
- Calleida discoidalis Heller, 1921 (Philippines)
- Calleida distincta Péringuey, 1896 (South Africa)
- Calleida dives Chaudoir, 1852 (Guatemala and Mexico)
- Calleida dolosa Liebke, 1939 (Cameroon)
- Calleida doriae Bates, 1892 (China, Indomalaya)
- Calleida dualana Liebke, 1939 (Cameroon)
- Calleida dyschroma Chaudoir, 1873 (French Guiana and Brazil)
- Calleida ecuadorica Liebke, 1939 (Ecuador)
- Calleida erwini Casale, 2021 (Peru)
- Calleida estebanae Liebke, 1935 (Venezuela)
- Calleida excellens Liebke, 1939 (Colombia)
- Calleida excelsa Bates, 1892 (China, India, Myanmar, and Thailand)
- Calleida fabulosa Liebke, 1939 (Paraguay and Brazil)
- Calleida fasciata Dejean & Boisduval, 1829 (Africa)
- Calleida fastuosa Klug, 1833 (Madagascar)
- Calleida feana Liebke, 1936 (Argentina)
- Calleida femoralis Chaudoir, 1873 (Bangladesh and India)
- Calleida fervida Péringuey, 1904 (Africa)
- Calleida festinans (Fabricius, 1801) (French Guiana)
- Calleida fimbriata Bates, 1883 (United States and Mexico)
- Calleida flava Chevrolat, 1833 (Central and South America)
- Calleida flohri Bates, 1883 (Mexico)
- Calleida fossulata Liebke, 1939 (Brazil)
- Calleida freyi Jedlicka, 1960 (China)
- Calleida fukiensis Jedlicka, 1964 (China)
- Calleida fulgida Dejean, 1831 (United States)
- Calleida fulvipes Reiche, 1842 (Colombia)
- Calleida fusca Brullé, 1837 (Bolivia)
- Calleida fuscicollis Liebke, 1939 (Zimbabwe)
- Calleida georgii Casale, 2008 (Mexico)
- Calleida gigantea Casale, 2008 (Ecuador)
- Calleida gounellei Liebke, 1935 (Brazil)
- Calleida gracilis Gemminger & Harold, 1868 (Hawaii)
- Calleida grata Péringuey, 1896 (Africa)
- Calleida gressittiana Casale & Shi, 2018 (Malaysia, Indonesia, and Borneo)
- Calleida guyanensis Chaudoir, 1873 (Guyana)
- Calleida haematodera Chaudoir, 1873 (Bolivia)
- Calleida haemorrhoa Fairmaire, 1896 (Madagascar)
- Calleida hasterti Liebke, 1935 (Venezuela)
- Calleida hoegei Bates, 1883 (Mexico)
- Calleida holochalca Alluaud, 1896 (Madagascar)
- Calleida honesta Liebke, 1935 (Argentina)
- Calleida horni Liebke, 1934 (Peru)
- Calleida howdeni Casale, 2008 (Ecuador)
- Calleida ignicincta Fairmaire, 1897 (Madagascar)
- Calleida ignobilis Bates, 1883 (Guatemala and Mexico)
- Calleida ikopae (Jeannel, 1949) (Madagascar)
- Calleida insperans Liebke, 1935 (Paraguay and Brazil)
- Calleida insueta (Basilewsky, 1961) (Malawi and South Africa)
- Calleida isabellae (Basilewsky, 1961) (Fernando Poo)
- Calleida jansoni Bates, 1878 (Central America)
- Calleida janthina Reiche, 1842 (Colombia)
- Calleida jeanneli Liebke, 1935 (Peru)
- Calleida jelineki Casale & Shi, 2018 (India)
- Calleida katangana (Basilewsky, 1961) (Democratic Republic of the Congo)
- Calleida kayae Casale, 2008 (Mexico)
- Calleida kivuensis Burgeon, 1937 (Democratic Republic of the Congo)
- Calleida klapperichi Jedlicka, 1964 (China and Taiwan)
- Calleida koppeli Steinheil, 1875 (Colombia)
- Calleida lacunosa Mannerheim, 1837 (Brazil)
- Calleida laetipennis Bates, 1878 (Nicaragua)
- Calleida lamottei (Basilewsky, 1951) (Guinea, Ivory Coast, and Cameroon)
- Calleida lampra Bates, 1883 (Guatemala)
- Calleida latelimbata Liebke, 1935 (Brazil)
- Calleida latior Liebke, 1935 (Costa Rica)
- Calleida lativittis Chaudoir, 1873 (Bangladesh, India, and Myanmar)
- Calleida lepida L.Redtenbacher, 1868 (East Asia)
- Calleida levistriata Chaudoir, 1873 (Bolivia and Mexico)
- Calleida limbata R.F.Sahlberg, 1847 (Brazil)
- Calleida limbipennis Liebke, 1935 (Brazil)
- Calleida lindigi Chaudoir, 1873 (Colombia)
- Calleida lojana Liebke, 1939 (Ecuador)
- Calleida longicollis (Jeannel, 1949) (Madagascar)
- Calleida lurida Chaudoir, 1873 (Colombia)
- Calleida luzonensis Casale & Shi, 2018 (Philippines)
- Calleida macrocephala (Jeannel, 1949) (Madagascar)
- Calleida macrospila Gestro, 1895 (Africa)
- Calleida magnifica Chaudoir, 1873 (Venezuela)
- Calleida malleri Liebke, 1939 (Brazil)
- Calleida manuensis Casale, 2021 (Peru)
- Calleida marginalis (Jeannel, 1949) (Madagascar)
- Calleida marginicollis Chaudoir, 1844 (South Africa)
- Calleida marginithorax Casale, 2021 (Peru)
- Calleida maxima Casale, 2021 (Peru)
- Calleida melzeri Liebke, 1934 (Brazil)
- Calleida mesotincta Liebke, 1939 (Paraguay)
- Calleida metallica Dejean, 1825 (Peru and Brazil)
- Calleida migratoria Casale in Desender et al., 2002 (Galapagos and Peru)
- Calleida minga (Basilewsky, 1961) (Africa)
- Calleida misella Chaudoir, 1873 (Mexico)
- Calleida mniszechii Chaudoir, 1852 (Chile and Peru)
- Calleida montana Liebke, 1939 (Ethiopia)
- Calleida moreti Casale, 2008 (Ecuador)
- Calleida nantae Liebke, 1939 (Brazil)
- Calleida natalis Péringuey, 1898 (South Africa)
- Calleida nevillei (Basilewsky, 1972) (Zimbabwe)
- Calleida nigricans Chaudoir, 1873 (Venezuela)
- Calleida nigriceps Chaudoir, 1844 (Brazil)
- Calleida nigripes Péringuey, 1904 (South Africa)
- Calleida nigriventris Hope, 1842 (Africa)
- Calleida nilgirensis Straneo, 1961 (India)
- Calleida nimbae (Basilewsky, 1963) (Guinea and Ivory Coast)
- Calleida obrieni Mateu, 1995 (United States)
- Calleida obscura Dejean, 1831 (Argentina)
- Calleida obscuroaenea Chaudoir, 1848 (Brazil)
- Calleida ohausi Liebke, 1939 (Colombia and Ecuador)
- Calleida olsoufieffi (Jeannel, 1949) (Madagascar)
- Calleida onoha Bates, 1873 (China, South Korea, Japan, and Taiwan)
- Calleida onorei Casale, 2008 (Ecuador)
- Calleida optima Liebke, 1935 (Venezuela)
- Calleida pallida Reiche, 1842 (Colombia)
- Calleida pallipes Andrewes, 1931 (Nepal, India, Myanmar, and Vietnam)
- Calleida pauliana Liebke, 1939 (Brazil)
- Calleida permunda Chaudoir, 1873 (Indonesia)
- Calleida perrieri (Jeannel, 1949) (Madagascar)
- Calleida perroti Jedlicka, 1964 (Vietnam)
- Calleida pexifrons Fairmaire, 1887 (Somalia and Tanzania)
- Calleida picicollis Liebke, 1935 (Venezuela)
- Calleida picipes Chaudoir, 1854 (Brazil)
- Calleida piligera Shi & Casale, 2018 (China and Taiwan)
- Calleida planulata LeConte, 1858 (United States, Belize, Guatemala, and Mexico)
- Calleida platynoides G.Horn, 1882 (United States and Mexico)
- Calleida plaumanni Liebke, 1939 (Brazil)
- Calleida plicaticollis Buquet, 1835 (Guyana and French Guiana)
- Calleida praegnans Liebke, 1939 (Brazil)
- Calleida praestans Chaudoir, 1878
- Calleida pretiosa Chaudoir, 1873 (Hispaniola)
- Calleida procerula Chaudoir, 1873 (Brazil)
- Calleida prolixa Erichson, 1847 (Peru and Brazil)
- Calleida properans Chaudoir, 1873 (Brazil)
- Calleida propinqua Fleutiaux, 1887 (India and Vietnam)
- Calleida pulcherrima Bates, 1883 (Panama)
- Calleida punctata LeConte, 1846 (United States and Canada)
- Calleida puncticollis Shi & Casale, 2018 (China)
- Calleida punctulata Chaudoir, 1848 (United States, Guatemala, and Mexico)
- Calleida purpurea (Say, 1823) (United States and Canada)
- Calleida purpuripennis Chaudoir, 1873 (Mexico)
- Calleida quadricollis Straneo, 1961 (India)
- Calleida quadriimpressa Chaudoir, 1848 (Brazil)
- Calleida rapax Andrewes, 1933 (India)
- Calleida rawlinsi Casale, 2008 (Ecuador)
- Calleida refulgens R.F.Sahlberg, 1847 (Brazil)
- Calleida regina Bates, 1883 (Guatemala)
- Calleida resplendens Reiche, 1842 (Colombia)
- Calleida rhodoptera Chaudoir, 1850 (Brazil)
- Calleida rhytidera Chaudoir, 1873 (Brazil)
- Calleida robusta Chaudoir, 1873 (Brazil)
- Calleida rosea Liebke, 1935 (Brazil)
- Calleida rubiginosa Chaudoir, 1873 (Africa)
- Calleida rubra Liebke, 1939 (Paraguay)
- Calleida rubricollis Dejean, 1825 (Cuba)
- Calleida ruficollis (Fabricius, 1801) (Africa)
- Calleida rufiventris Chaudoir, 1877 (South Africa)
- Calleida rufocuprea Chaudoir, 1873 (Brazil)
- Calleida rufolimbata Motschulsky, 1864 (South Africa)
- Calleida rufopicea Casale, 2008 (Ecuador)
- Calleida rugosicollis (Jeannel, 1949) (Madagascar)
- Calleida rustica Bates, 1883 (Mexico)
- Calleida rutilans Chaudoir, 1850 (Colombia)
- Calleida sanguinicollis Dejean, 1831 (Central and South America)
- Calleida saphyrina Chaudoir, 1848 (Brazil)
- Calleida schistoptera Chaudoir, 1873 (Brazil)
- Calleida schumacheri Steinheil, 1875 (Colombia)
- Calleida scintillans Bates, 1883 (Panama)
- Calleida scutellaris Chaudoir, 1873 (Brazil)
- Calleida semicincta Bates, 1883 (Panama)
- Calleida semifacta Bates, 1883 (Belize, Guatemala, Mexico)
- Calleida semirubra Bates, 1878 (Nicaragua)
- Calleida semiviolacea Liebke, 1935 (Brazil)
- Calleida sericinitens Bates, 1883 (Belize and Guatemala)
- Calleida seyrigi (Jeannel, 1949) (Madagascar)
- Calleida sicardi (Jeannel, 1949) (Madagascar)
- Calleida silvicola Péringuey, 1896 (South Africa)
- Calleida similis Reiche, 1842 (Colombia and Panama)
- Calleida skwarrae Liebke, 1932 (Mexico)
- Calleida smaragdinipennis Reiche, 1842 (Colombia)
- Calleida smaragdula Reiche, 1843 (Colombia and Peru)
- Calleida solitaria Casale, 2021 (Peru)
- Calleida somalica (Basilewsky, 1968) (Somalia)
- Calleida splendidula (Fabricius, 1801) (China, Japan, Taiwan, Indomalaya)
- Calleida strandi Liebke, 1939 (Brazil)
- Calleida subaenea Mannerheim, 1837 (Brazil)
- Calleida subfasciata (Basilewsky, 1953) (Democratic Republic of the Congo)
- Calleida sulcatula Chaudoir, 1877 (Guatemala)
- Calleida sultana Bates, 1892 (India and Myanmar)
- Calleida sultanoides Straneo, 1961 (Nepal and India)
- Calleida sumptuosa Bates, 1883 (Mexico)
- Calleida suturalis Dejean, 1831 (Argentina)
- Calleida suturella Reiche, 1842 (Colombia, Ecuador, and Brazil)
- Calleida syllara (Basilewsky, 1961) (Africa)
- Calleida tenuis Andrewes, 1929 (Malaysia, Singapore, Indonesia, and Borneo)
- Calleida terminata C.O.Waterhouse, 1876 (Indonesia and Borneo)
- Calleida tetrapora Bates, 1883 (Panama)
- Calleida thalassina Dejean, 1831 (Brazil)
- Calleida tibialis Brullé, 1837 (Chile, Colombia, and Peru)
- Calleida tinctipes Bates, 1884 (Panama)
- Calleida tinctula Darlington, 1934 (Cuba)
- Calleida titschacki Liebke, 1951 (Peru)
- Calleida translucens Liebke, 1935 (Brazil)
- Calleida tristis Brullé, 1837 (Bolivia)
- Calleida tropicalis Bates, 1883 (Mexico)
- Calleida truncata Chevrolat, 1835 (Belize, Guatemala, and Mexico)
- Calleida tunicata Liebke, 1939 (Brazil)
- Calleida turrialbae Liebke, 1936 (Costa Rica)
- Calleida umbrigera Chaudoir, 1873 (Africa)
- Calleida urundiana (Basilewsky, 1956) (Burundi)
- Calleida variolosa Bates, 1883 (Guatemala)
- Calleida ventralis Liebke, 1939 (Angola)
- Calleida viet Casale & Shi, 2018 (Vietnam)
- Calleida vignai Casale, 2008 (Ecuador)
- Calleida villiersi (Basilewsky, 1953) (Fernando Poo)
- Calleida violacea Reiche, 1842 (Colombia and Ecuador)
- Calleida violaceipennis (Jeannel, 1949) (Madagascar)
- Calleida viridana Liebke, 1939 (Colombia)
- Calleida viridiaurea Chaudoir, 1877 (Peru)
- Calleida viridicincta Motschulsky, 1864 (Panama)
- Calleida viridicuprea Chaudoir, 1852 (Brazil)
- Calleida viridimicans Chaudoir, 1873 (Brazil)
- Calleida viridipallia Liebke, 1939 (Brazil)
- Calleida viridipennis (Say, 1823) (United States)
- Calleida viridivestis Liebke, 1939 (Venezuela)
- Calleida wittei (Basilewsky, 1953) (Democratic Republic of the Congo)
- Calleida yunnanensis Shi & Casale, 2018 (China and Laos)
- Calleida zumpti Liebke, 1939 (Cameroon)
