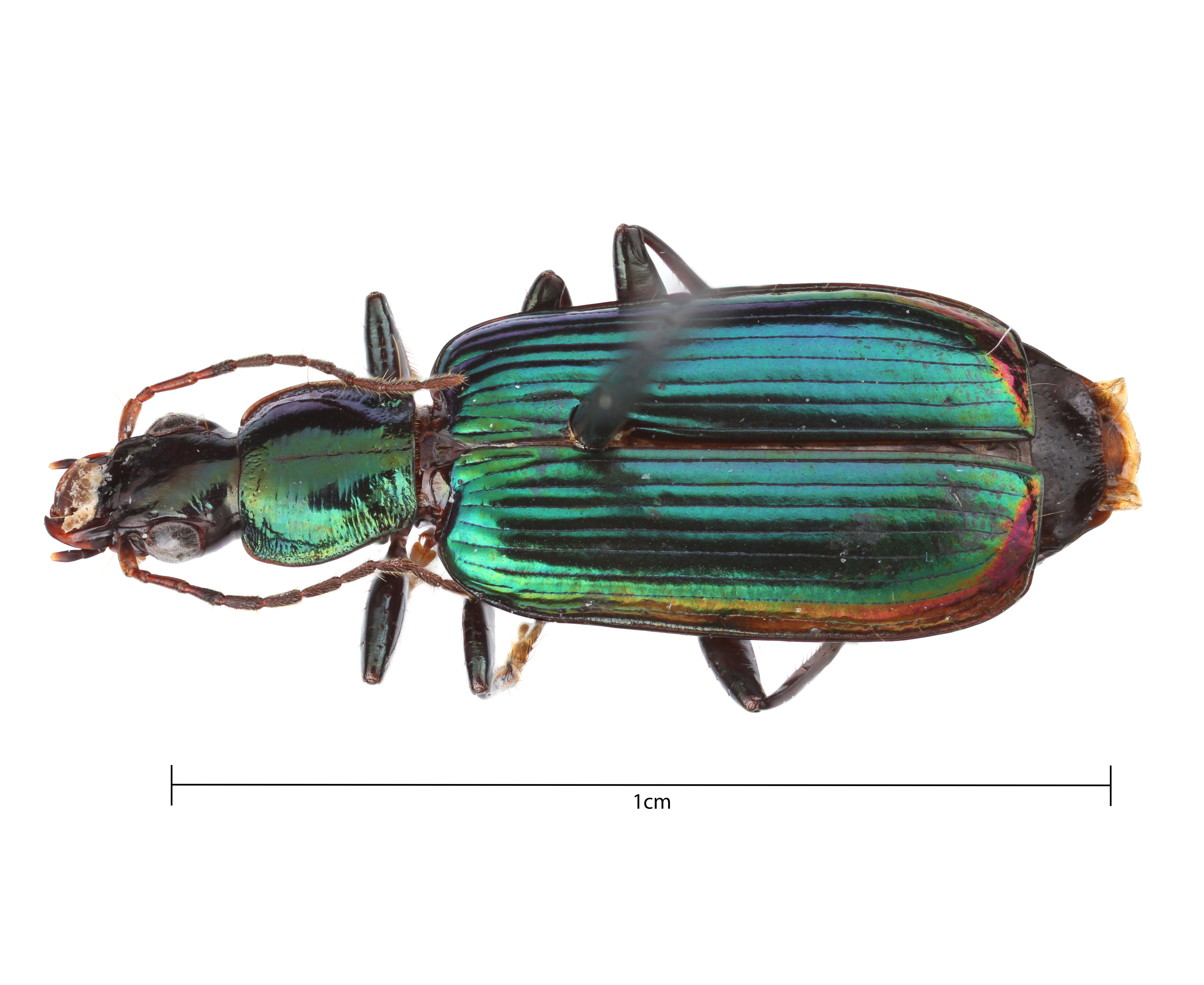

Scientific classification
- Kingdom: Animalia
- Phylum: Arthropoda
- Clade: Pancrustacea
- Class: Insecta
- Order: Coleoptera
- Suborder: Adephaga
- Family: Carabidae
- Genus: Calleida
- Species: C. viridipennis

Binomial name
- Calleida viridipennis (Say, 1823)

= Calleida viridipennis =

Species of ground beetle

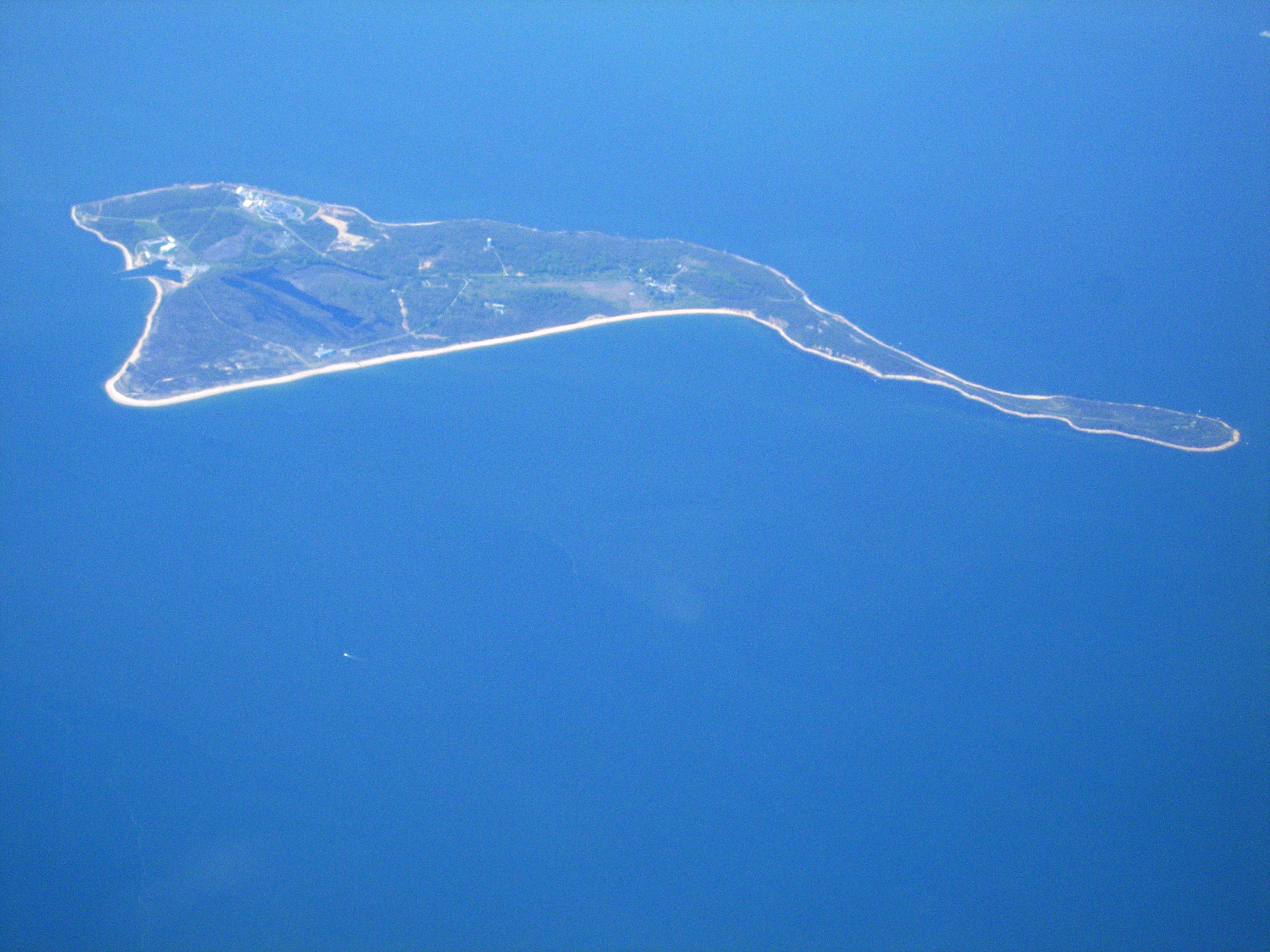
Aerial photoshoot of Plummers Island, Maryland.

The Calleida viridipennis is a species of ground beetle belonging to the Carabidae family, and are referred to as carabid beetles. It is found in various states, including New York, New Mexico, Louisiana, and Florida. Habitat preferences include forests and swamps. C. virdipennis is a particular carabid beetle that is, on average, 10 mm long. Recognizable by a green-black metallic exoskeleton, it has a trapezoidal head shape. Its large eyes are also characteristic of the species. Below the exoskeleton reside functional wings, giving the beetle flight capacity.

C. viridipennis is a spring breeder, rather than an autumn breeder. Therefore, they give rise to summer larvae and overwinter in the adult state. The female to male sex ratio does not differ significantly from the expected 1:1 ratio.

Their diet consists of both animals and plants. C. viridipennis is a predator of the larva of the tortoise beetle, Hemisphaerota cyanea. It is also a predator of the fruittree leafroller, Archipis argyrospila, caterpillar. Within the carabid beetle species, food preferences are often linked to habitat preferences.

== Taxonomy ==
Calleida viridipennis is a carabid beetle, a type of ground beetle. This classification is given to all beetles in the Carabidae family, which belongs to the order Coleoptera. The body size of a carabid beetle is linked with habitat succession and stability. Carabid beetles feed on both animals and plants; however, broader mandibles suggest a preference for plants and seeds. Food preferences may also be linked with other characteristics such as body size or habitat preference. Species with larger eyes seem to prefer diurnal activity. C. viridipennis, having larger eyes, belongs to the diurnal subpopulation of carabid beetles. As a species-rich group, carabid beetles play important roles as bioindicators and mediators of nutrient flows in ecosystems.

In 1932, 11 species of Calleida in the US and 177 species in the world had been recorded.

The number of carabid species has dropped. A study conducted on Plummers Island, Maryland, which sampled ground beetles between 1901 and 1915, and then again in 1970 and 1978, found a decrease in species number.

== Distribution ==
The C. viridipennis beetle has a distribution that ranges from northern to southern America. The beetle has been observed to reside in southwestern New York to eastern Mexico, including southwestern Iowa. C. viridipennis has also been seen in Texas, Louisiana, and Florida. Research studies interested in investigating the predation of C. viridipennis have focused on the beetle populations found in Louisiana and Florida. Possible sightings of the beetle have been noted in Utah, Arizona, and California. It has also been found inhabiting Saint Martin, an island in the Caribbean.

== Genetic population structure ==
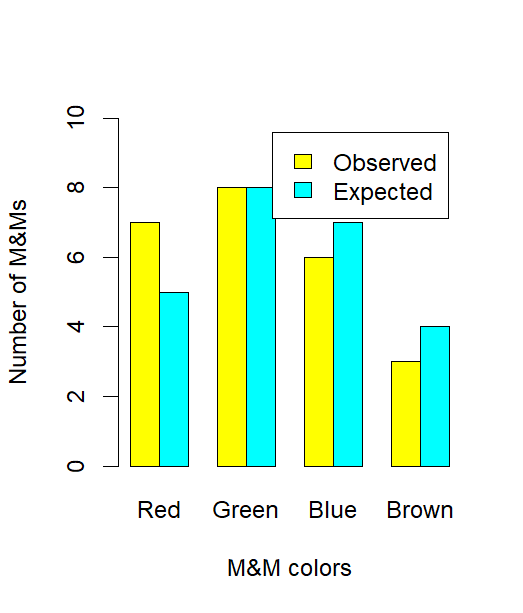
Comparison of Expected to Observed for a Chi Squared Goodness of Fit Test.

In having collected 146 adult C. viridipennis, researchers determined the sex ratio of females to males to be 1.1 to 1.

Sex allocation refers to the allocation of resources to male and female production. Species may choose to manipulate the sex of their offspring to increase the fitness of the parents. While this would result in a skewed sex ratio biased towards one sex, Fisher’s Theory of Equal Investment maintains that a 1:1 ratio should be favored. The null hypothesis is that female and male offspring are equally costly to reproduce.

The 1.1:1 ratio in the C. viridipennis beetle is also the evolutionary stable strategy (ESS). As described by Richard Dawkins, an evolutionary biologist who published The Selfish Gene, an ESS is a strategy that when adopted by most members of the population, it cannot be invaded by another strategy.

== Life cycle ==
The life cycle of a beetle consists of 4 different stages: egg, larval, pupal and adult. Carabid eggs are distributed among foliage and host webs. C. viridipennis is a spring beetle, thus larvae occur from late-March to early- or mid-October. Overwintering occurs in the adult state underneath tree bark. Conversely, autumn breeders lay eggs in the fall and overwinter in the larval stage. Adults survive approximately one year.

=== Eggs ===
The length of the egg ranges between 1.0 and 1.3 mm. It is white to gray, and is oval shaped. The egg is enclosed in a purse that has been observed to be made of bark, silk, leaves, and grass. They are suspended from the leaves by a silk stalk.

=== Larvae ===
The average length of the beetle larva is 7.99 to 14.11 mm long, and is characterized by its metallic black to green tergites. The head is trapezoidal and differs in color as it is yellow to reddish-brown. The antennae is composed of 4 segments. The mandibles are longer than the antennae. The widest part of the beetle are the thoracic segments. The beetle typically bears 4 blunt teeth.

=== Pupa ===
The length measured from the crest of the head to the apex of the abdomen is recorded to be 6.6 to 7.7 mm.

== Habitat ==
Its habitat is characterized by open forests and swamps, which provide bark under which the beetle resides. Adult beetles have been found under the bark of baldcypress, Taxodium distichum, and black willow, Salix nigra, at a height of more than 40 cm above the water level in forested wetlands. Overwintering, the manner in which an insect passes the winter season, is done under tree bark. C. viridipennis will leave its habitat under the bark when the temperature is more suitable or food sources are more available. This occurs in late February or early March, which coincides with the activity of fruittree leafroller, Archips argyrospila, caterpillars. The beetle is a predator of the fruittree leafroller.

== Behavior ==
=== Overwintering ===
Overwintering is a characteristic behavior of the beetle. Beetles reside under bark in the adult stage, and emerge in late February or early March to begin breeding. Overwintering has been observed to coincide with the activity of prey. Thus, this behavior may be adopted to avoid low food resources, as well as avoid cold temperatures.

The ability to overwinter requires physiological and behavioral adaptations. Cold temperatures may lead to the freezing of body fluids, which the beetle must be prepared to combat. Overwintering under bark is a behavioral adaptation to the cold temperatures. In addition, metabolic suppression serves to save energy reserves.

=== Predation ===
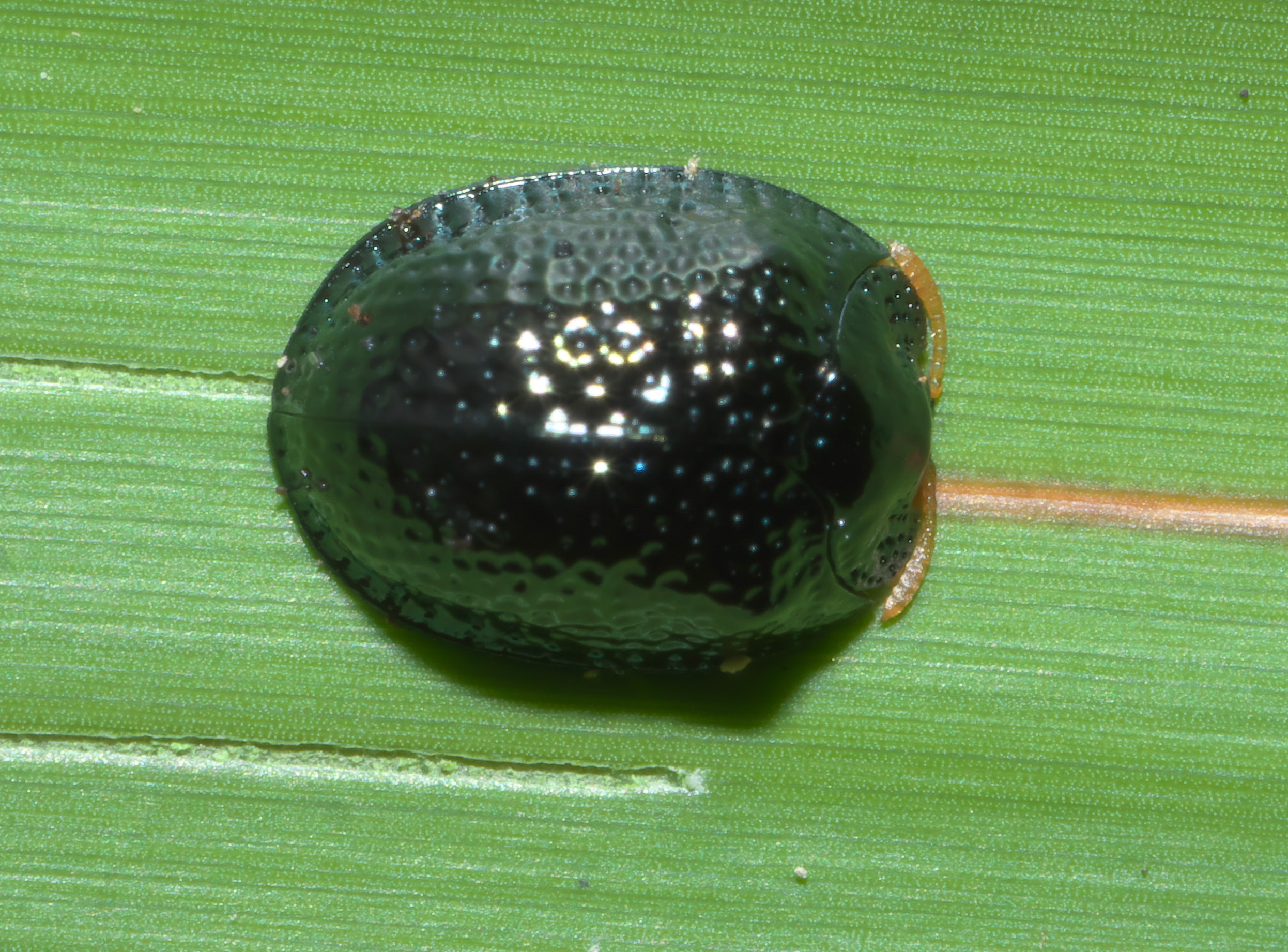
C. viridipennis is a predator of the larva of the tortoise beetle, Hemisphaerota cyanea.

The beetle C. viridipennis is a predator of the larva of the tortoise beetle, Hemisphaerota cyanea. The larva constructs a thatch from fecal strands. As the larva grows, the thatch is enlarged. Production of the thatch begins when the larva hatches from the egg. Population occurs beneath the thatch. When fully constructed, the thatch completely conceals and physically shields that larva. It is a defense mechanism against predators.

The physiology that allows for the making of the thatches by H. cyanea involves the accumulation of waste, which forms into a shield-like structure. This structure serves to take up feces, which is then emitted in strands. Larvae are capable of maneuvering the shield to face a certain direction.

The mechanism by which the beetle feeds on the larva involves forcing itself beneath the thatch or chewing its way into it, as observed by researchers. Predation tests were conducted at the Archbold Biological Station in Florida. A beetle was placed in a Petri dish, along with 15 larvae over a period of 20 days. The larvae were all eaten. Observations included immediate attack upon contact with the thatch by the beetle. Researchers observed this behavior to be consistent, suggesting that predation of the larvae was a matter of routine.

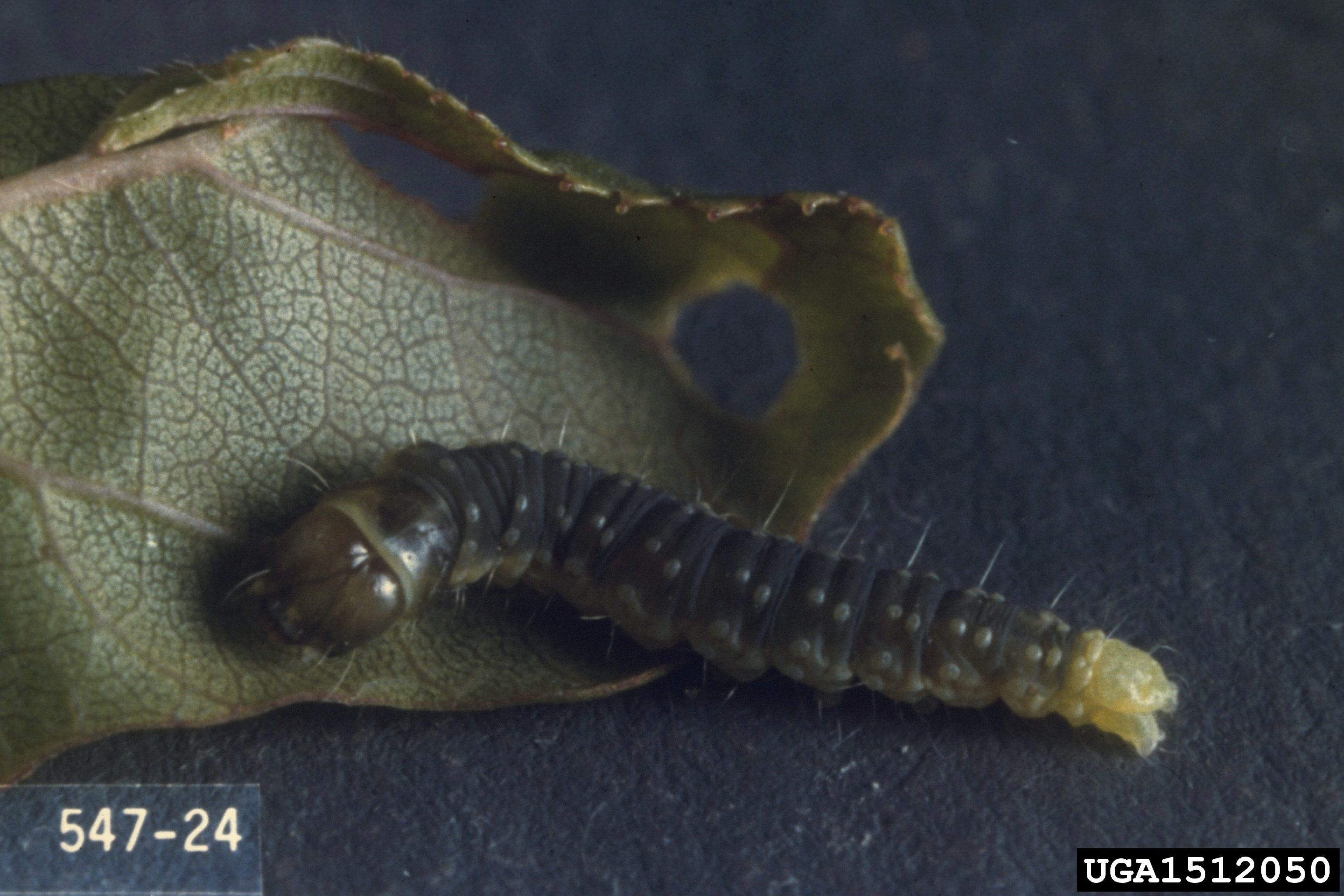
C. viridipennis is a predator of Archips argyrospila larva.

Researchers believe the physiology of the beetle is a potential explanation of its ability to circumvent the defense of the larvae. Due to its large eyes, agility, flight capacity, and diurnal feeding habits, it may have little difficulty in locating the larvae. The ability to overcome the fecal shield may also be a result of its larger body size compared to other potential predators who have been unsuccessful in overcoming this particular defense mechanism.

The beetle is also a known predator of the fruittree leafroller, Archips argyrospila, caterpillar. They are active on bald cypress trees. The emergence of the beetle from overwintering coincides with the activity of the caterpillar.

== Conservation efforts ==
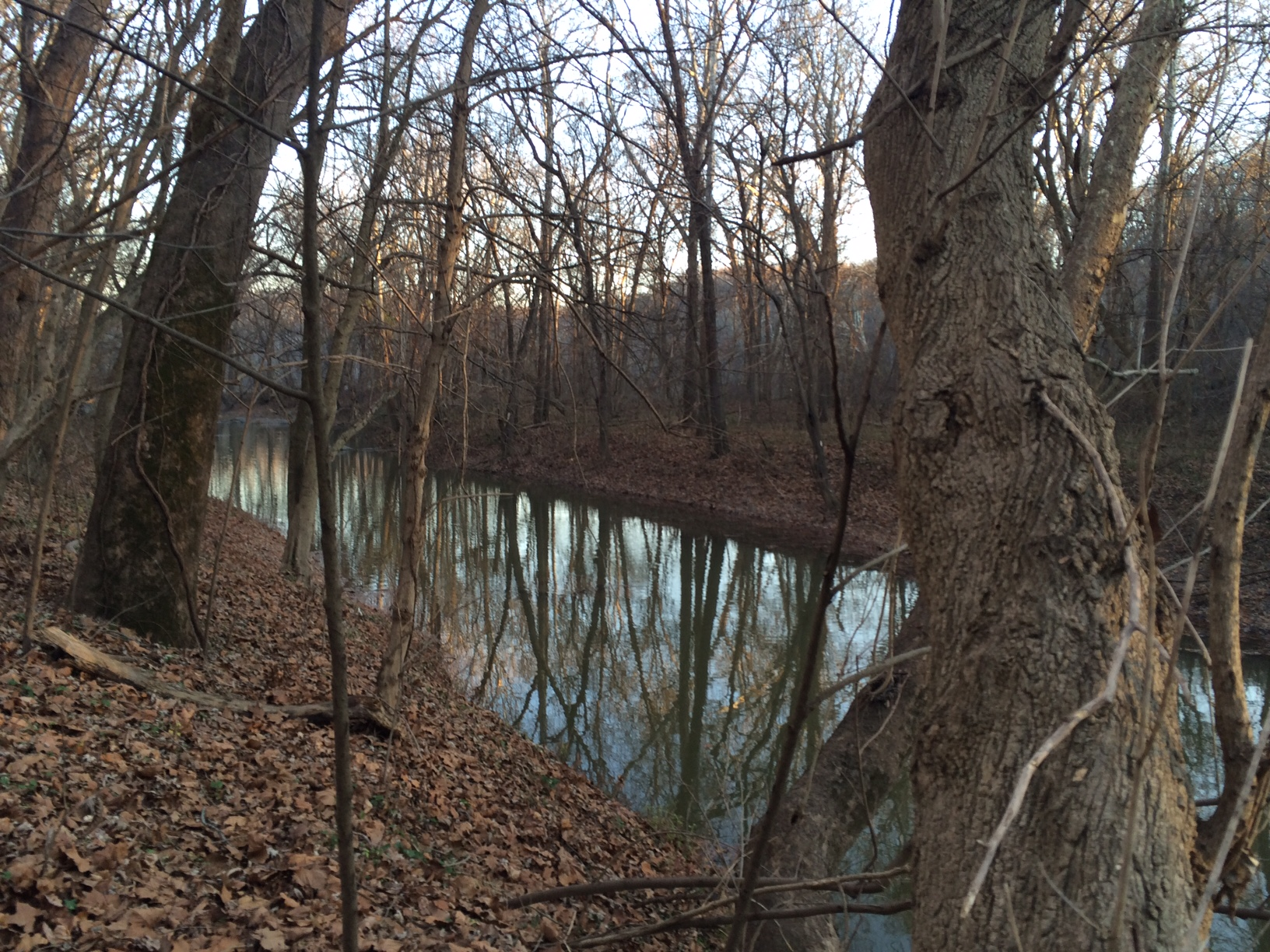
Vegetation of Plummers Island.

As observed on Plummers Island, the total carabid species number dropped between 1915 and 1970. C. viridipennis is known to reside in this habitat. The decrease in species may reflect changes to the environment and the vegetation. Further research has been conducted using carabid beetles to assess the effect of human-caused environmental changes. Researcher Jari Niemelä reviewed the effects of habitat fragmentation on carabid beetles.

Fragmentation is defined as the breaking of a whole into many smaller remnants. This can alter the abundance and the species richness. Carabid beetles are threatened by habitat fragmentation. Conservation efforts may reduce the degree to which beetles are being threatened.
