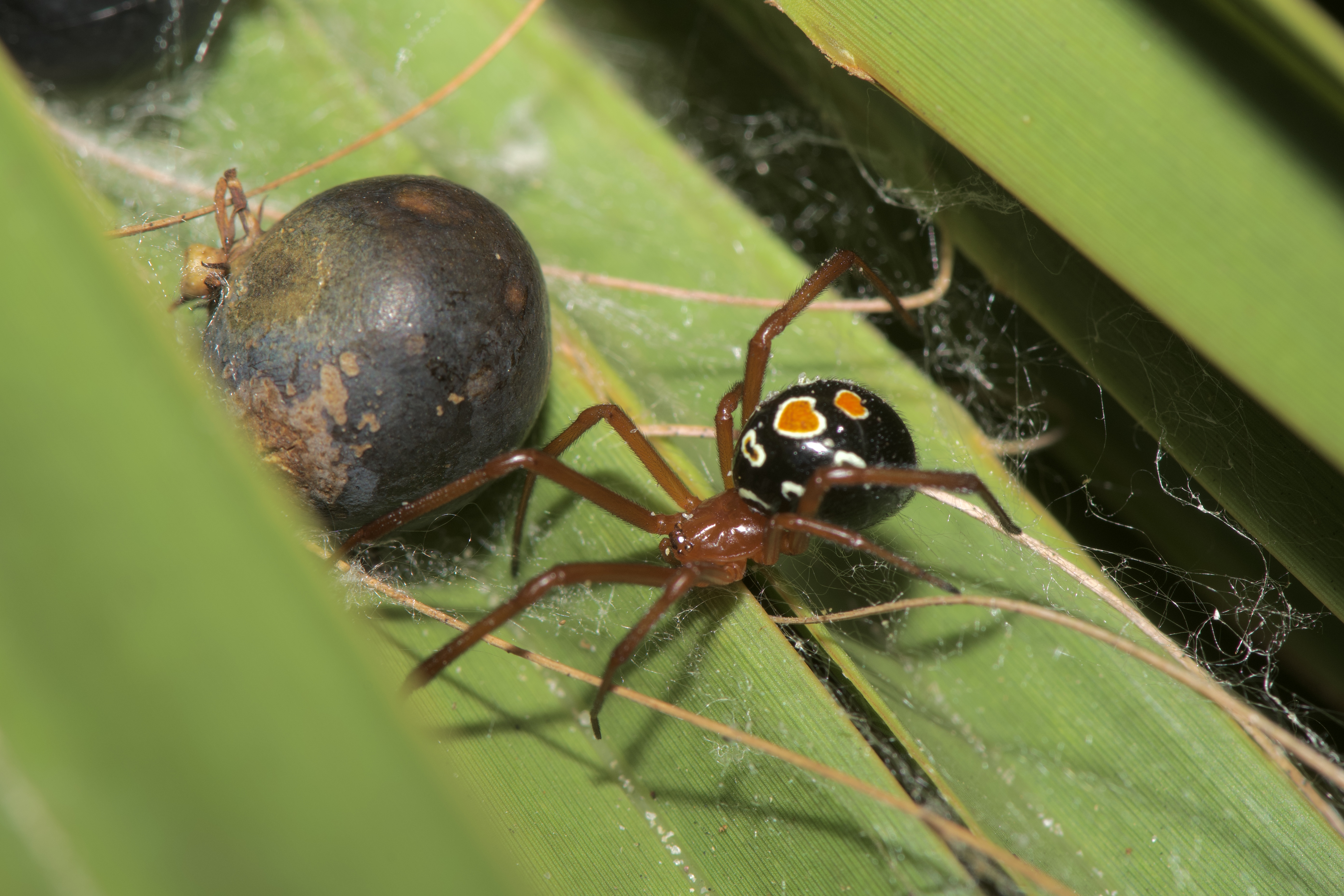
- Found in Ocala National Forest

Conservation status
- Vulnerable (NatureServe)

Scientific classification
- Kingdom: Animalia
- Phylum: Arthropoda
- Subphylum: Chelicerata
- Class: Arachnida
- Order: Araneae
- Infraorder: Araneomorphae
- Family: Theridiidae
- Genus: Latrodectus
- Species: L. bishopi

Binomial name
- Latrodectus bishopi Kaston, 1938

= Latrodectus bishopi =

Red widow spider

Species of spider

Latrodectus bishopi is the scientific name for the red widow spider, which is endemic to the Florida scrub habitat of central and southern Florida, where it lives primarily in sand dunes dominated by sand pine, Pinus clausa – a type of vegetation found only in Florida and coastal Alabama.

== Description ==
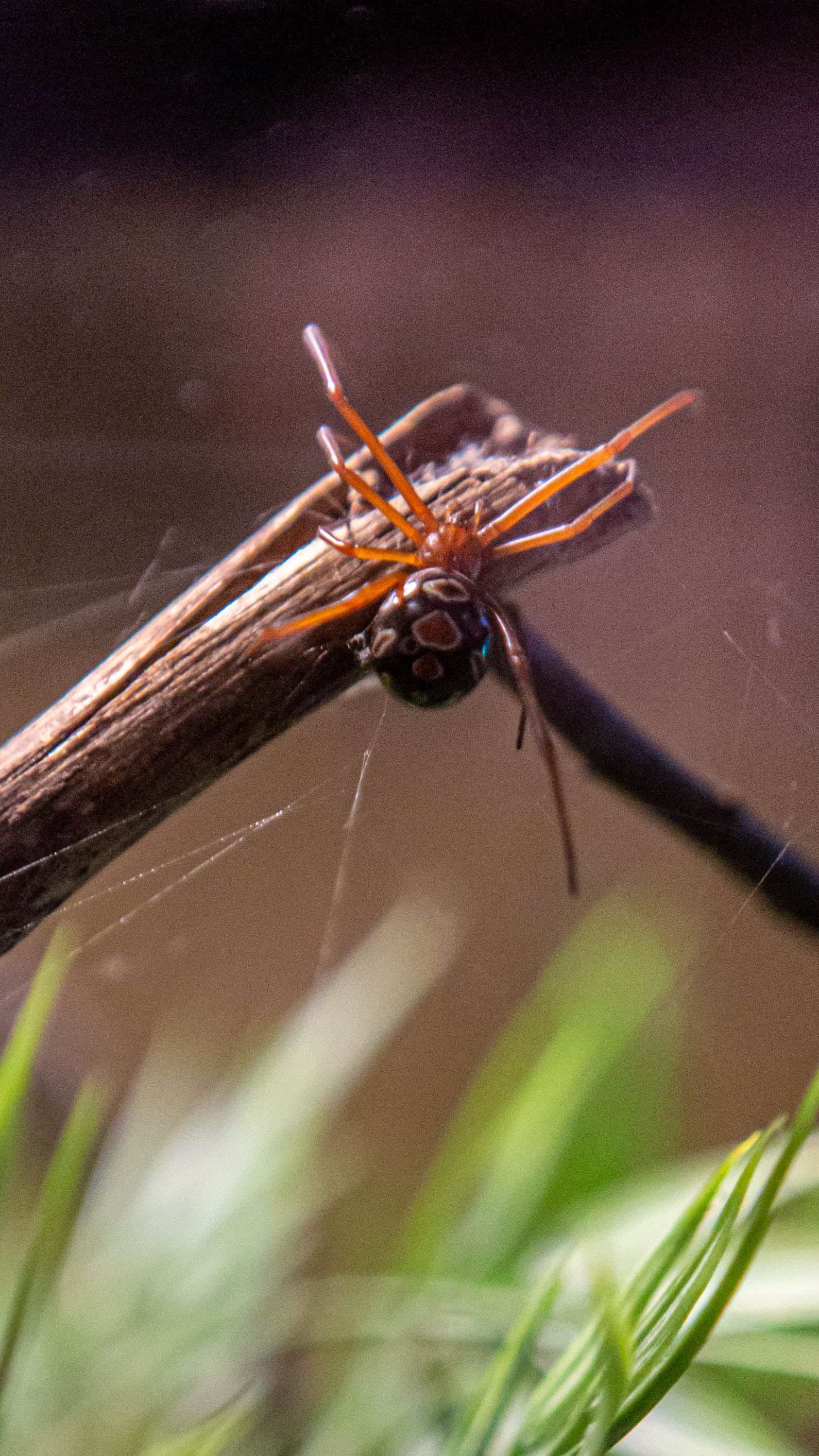
Specimen bred in captivity

The red widow, L. bishopi, has a red-orange cephalothorax, its abdomen is black with yellow rings outlining the rows of red spots and its legs are vermillion red. On its underside, it does not have the familiar hourglass marking and instead usually has one or two small red marks. Females are almost double the size of the male.

== Taxonomy ==
The species was first described in 1938 by B. J. Kaston as the variety bishopi of the species Latrodectus mactans. The name bishopi honors Marshall B. Bishop who collected the specimens on which the description was based. Latrodectus bishopi was raised to a full species in 1964 by John D. McCrone and Herbert W. Levi. It can be distinguished from L. mactans by features of the male and female genitalia: the embolus of the male palpal bulb has one fewer loop as do the connecting ducts leading to the female spermatheca.

== Distribution and Ecology ==
L. bishopi is endemic to central and southern Florida. It is restricted to sand-pine scrub – inland areas of dry sand dunes dominated by sand pine, Pinus clausa. Within these areas, the species makes most of its webs in palmetto bushes (Serenoa repens and Sabal etonia) at heights of 30 cm or more above the ground. The webs are tangled, with a funnel shaped retreat for the spider below. The spider also stores its egg sacs in this retreat. The species is a known predator of Hemisphaerota cyanea. Possible predators of L. bishopi include sphecid wasps and the Florida scrub jay.

== Toxicity ==
L. bishopi has been reported to be venomous like the other Latrodectus members, and although no bites by this spider are recorded in the medical literature, a bite has been captured on video and documented by biologist Spencer Hoffman on the YouTube channel MyWildBackyard on April 15, 2023. The bite resulted in a mildly painful throbbing sensation that lasted several hours. Unlike cosmopolitan species such as the black and brown widows, it seldom comes into contact with humans. The median lethal dose (LD_{50}) of the spider's venom has been measured in mice as 2.20 mg/kg (with a confidence interval of 1.29-3.74), and each spider contains about 0.157 mg.

== Conservation status ==
L. bishopi is a threatened species in the United States.
