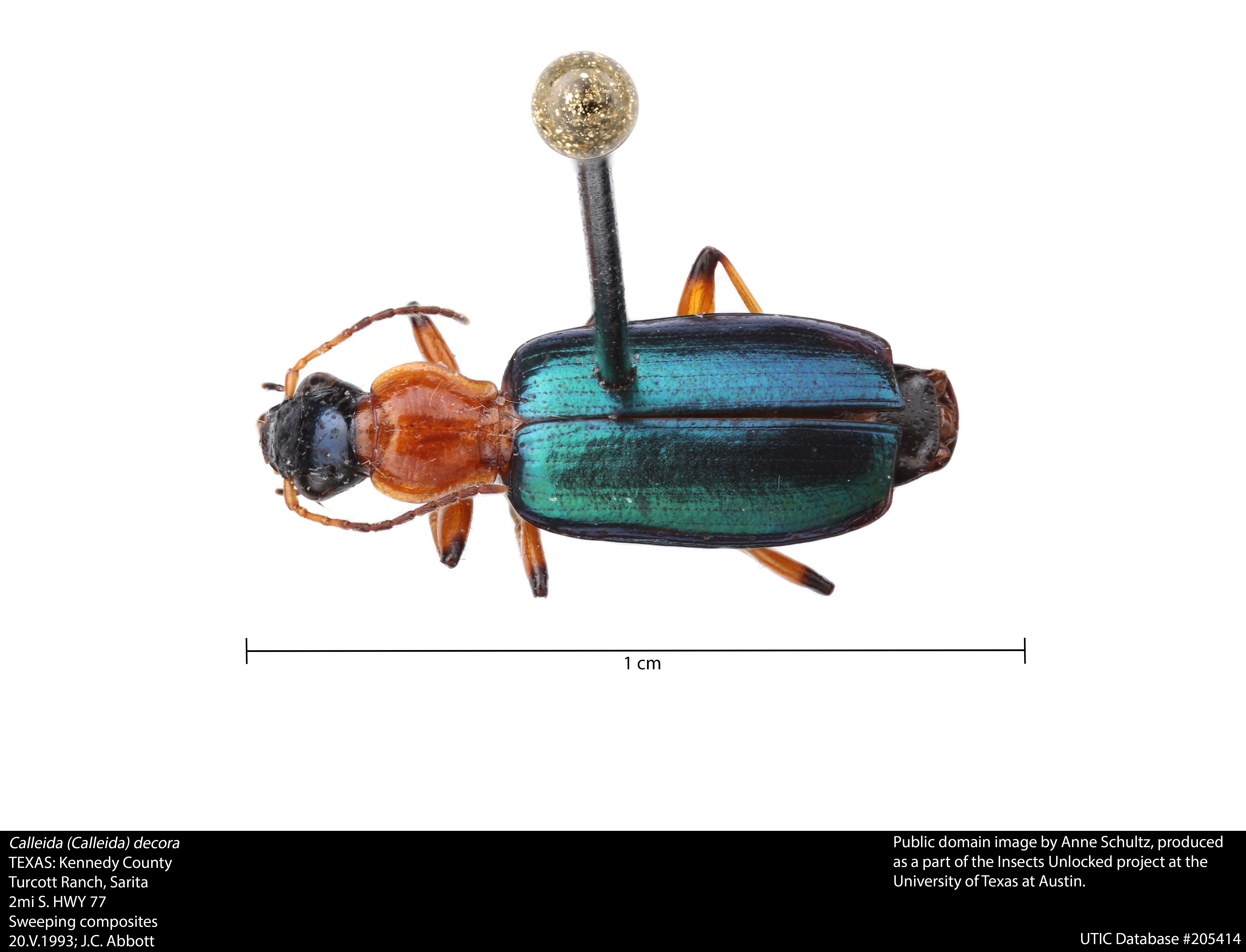

Scientific classification
- Kingdom: Animalia
- Phylum: Arthropoda
- Class: Insecta
- Order: Coleoptera
- Suborder: Adephaga
- Family: Carabidae
- Genus: Calleida
- Species: C. cordicollis

Binomial name
- Calleida cordicollis Putzeys, 1845

Synonyms
- Calleida decora (Fabricius, 1801)

= Calleida cordicollis =

Species of beetle

Calleida cordicollis is a species of ground beetle in the family Carabidae.
