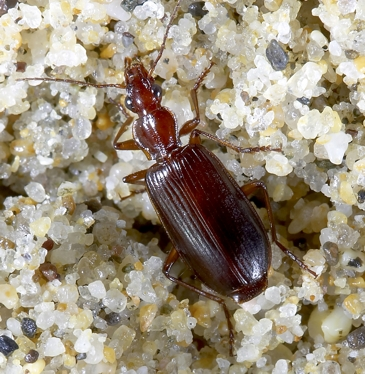

Scientific classification
- Domain: Eukaryota
- Kingdom: Animalia
- Phylum: Arthropoda
- Class: Insecta
- Order: Coleoptera
- Suborder: Adephaga
- Family: Carabidae
- Subfamily: Lebiinae
- Tribe: Lebiini
- Genus: Calleida
- Species: C. platynoides

Binomial name
- Calleida platynoides G. Horn, 1882

Synonyms
- Lecalida nigritula Casey, 1920

= Calleida platynoides =

Species of beetle

Calleida platynoides is a species of ground beetle in the family Carabidae. It is found in North America.
