= Calleida purpurea =

Scientific classification
- Domain: Eukaryota
- Kingdom: Animalia
- Phylum: Arthropoda
- Class: Insecta
- Order: Coleoptera
- Suborder: Adephaga
- Family: Carabidae
- Genus: Calleida
- Species: C. purpurea

Binomial name
- Calleida purpurea (Say, 1823)

Species of beetle

Calleida purpurea is a species of ground beetle in the family Carabidae. It is found in North America.
