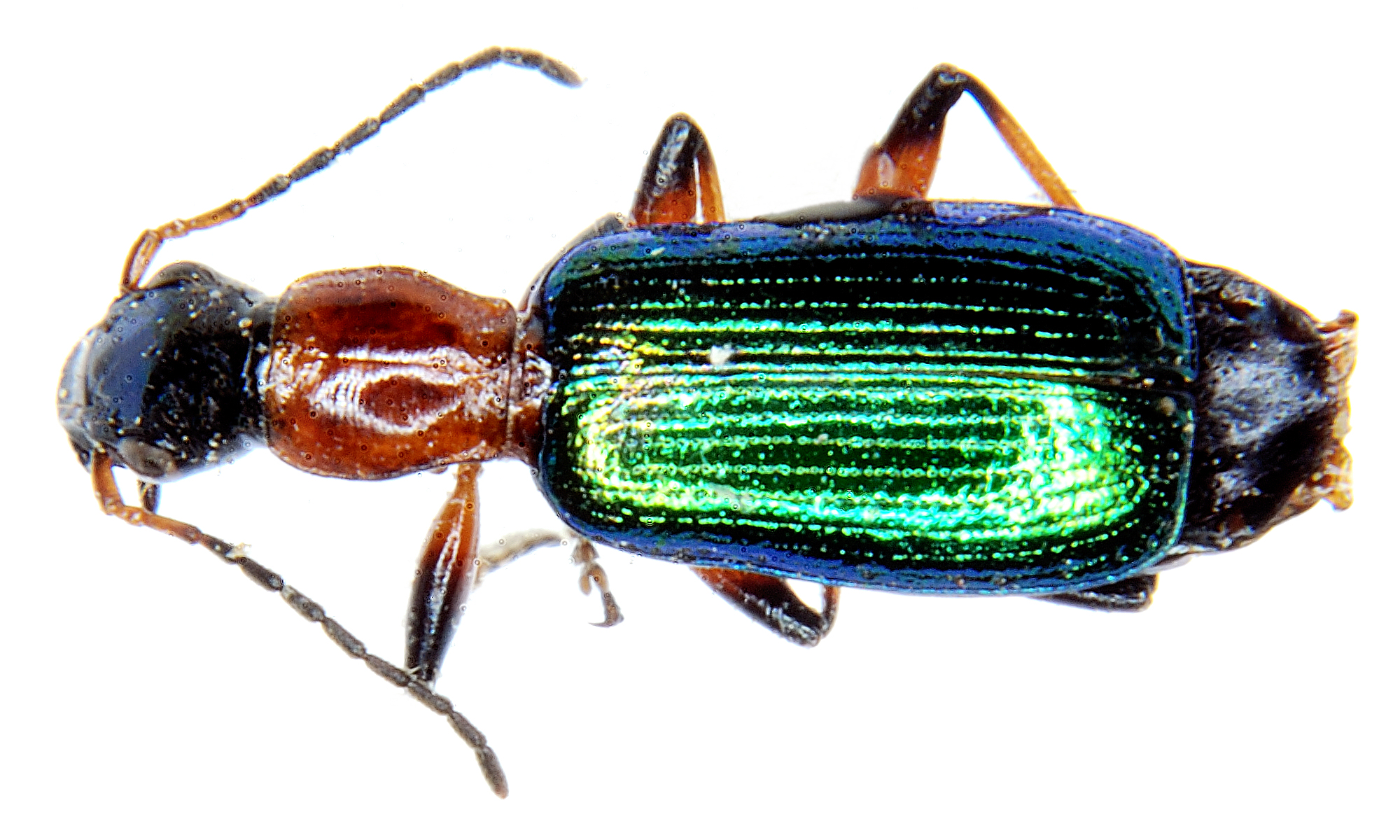

Scientific classification
- Kingdom: Animalia
- Phylum: Arthropoda
- Class: Insecta
- Order: Coleoptera
- Suborder: Adephaga
- Family: Carabidae
- Genus: Calleida
- Species: C. punctata

Binomial name
- Calleida punctata LeConte, 1846

= Calleida punctata =

Species of beetle

Calleida punctata is a species of ground beetle in the family Carabidae. It is found in North America.

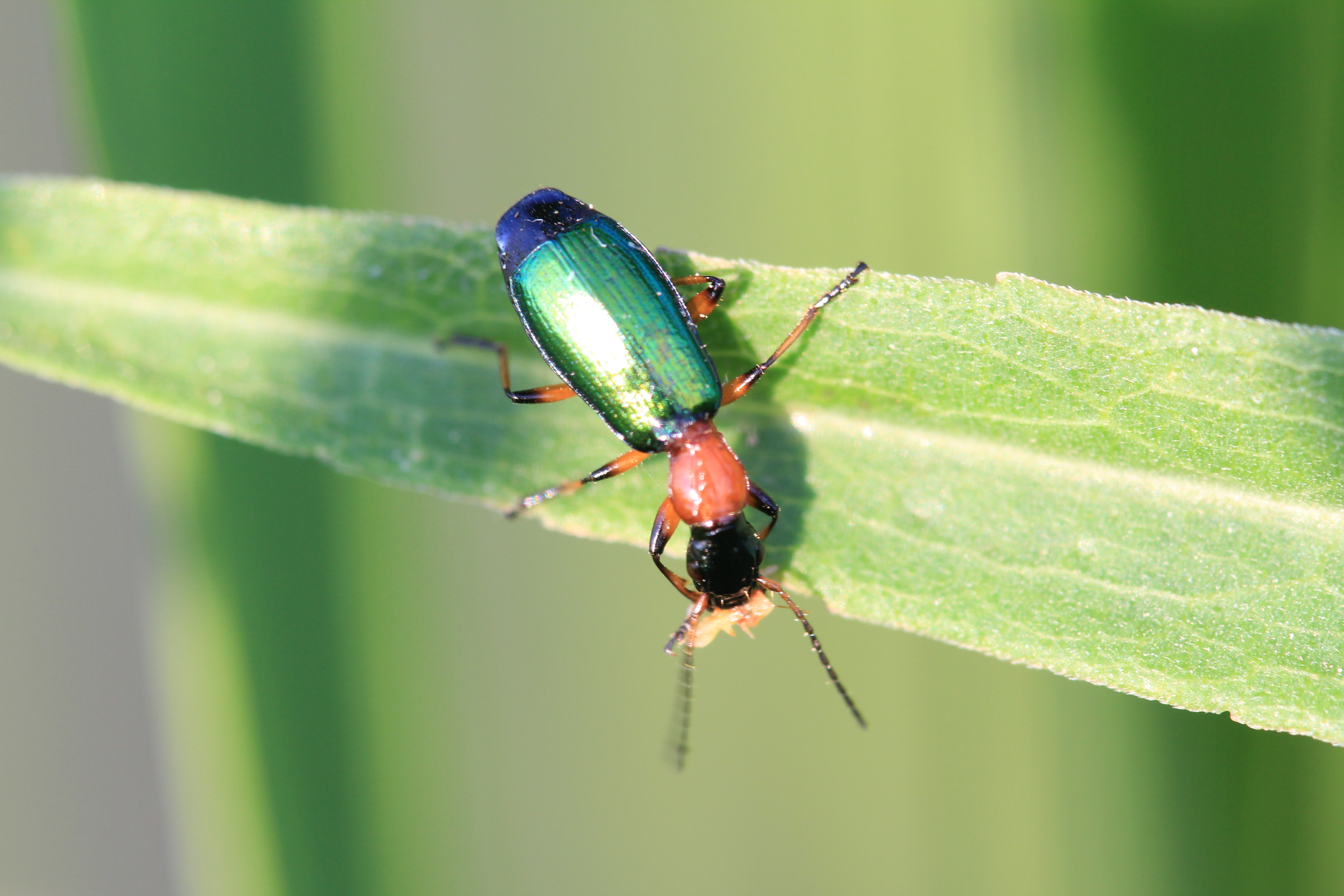
