= Calleida planulata =

Scientific classification
- Domain: Eukaryota
- Kingdom: Animalia
- Phylum: Arthropoda
- Class: Insecta
- Order: Coleoptera
- Suborder: Adephaga
- Family: Carabidae
- Subfamily: Lebiinae
- Tribe: Lebiini
- Genus: Calleida
- Species: C. planulata

Binomial name
- Calleida planulata LeConte, 1858

Species of beetle

Calleida planulata is a species of ground beetle in the family Carabidae. It is found in North America.

== Subspecies ==
These two subspecies belong to the species Calleida planulata:

- Calleida planulata atrata Bates, 1883
- Calleida planulata planulata LeConte, 1858
