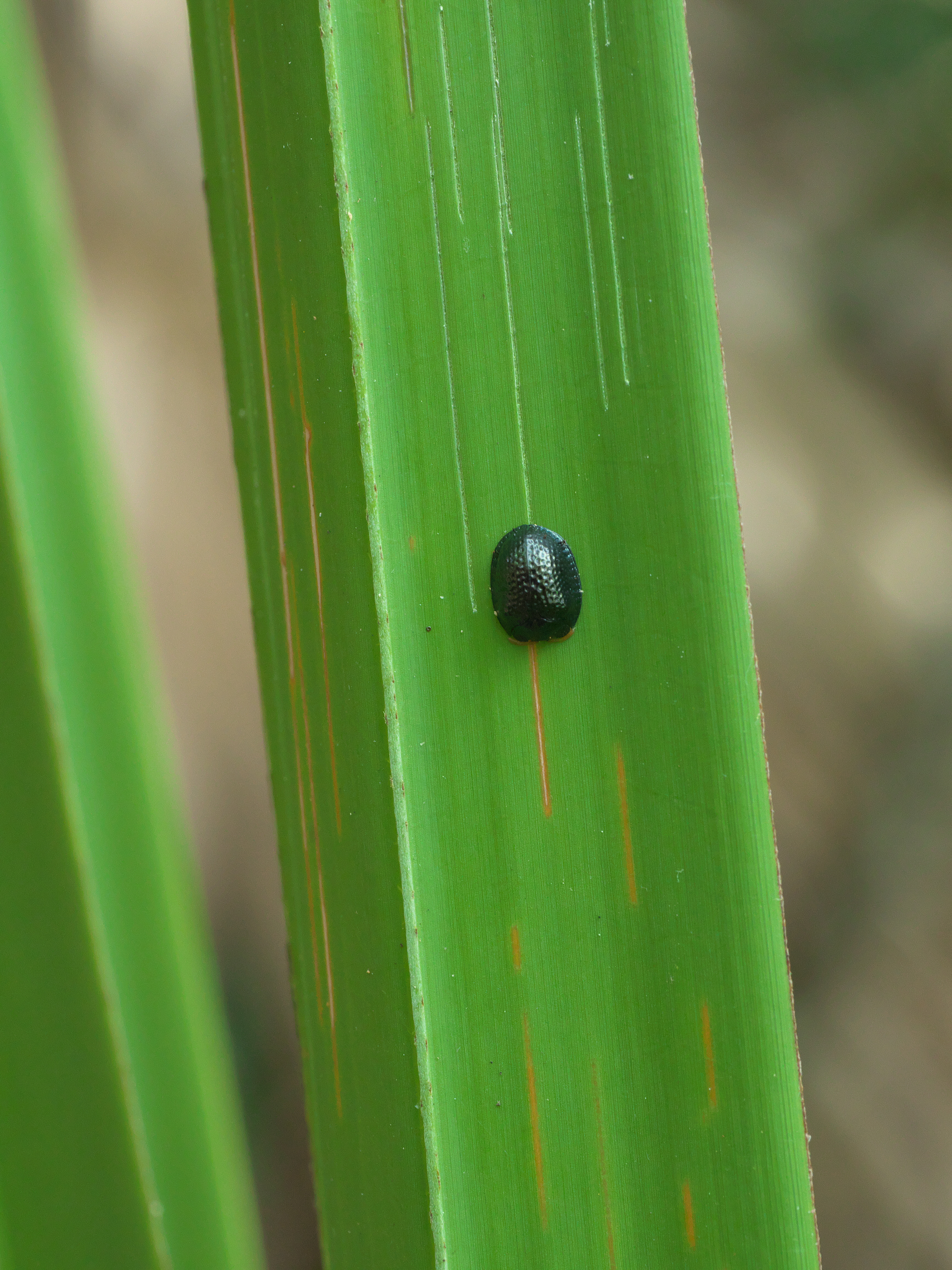
- Hemisphaerota cyanea

Scientific classification
- Kingdom: Animalia
- Phylum: Arthropoda
- Class: Insecta
- Order: Coleoptera
- Suborder: Polyphaga
- Infraorder: Cucujiformia
- Family: Chrysomelidae
- Tribe: Hemisphaerotini
- Genus: Hemisphaerota; Chevrolat in Dejean, 1836

Synonyms
- Porphyraspis Hope, 1840

= Hemisphaerota =

Genus of beetles

Hemisphaerota is a genus in the subfamily Cassidinae (tortoise beetles and 'hispines') in the family Chrysomelidae. There are about 10 described species in Hemisphaerota.

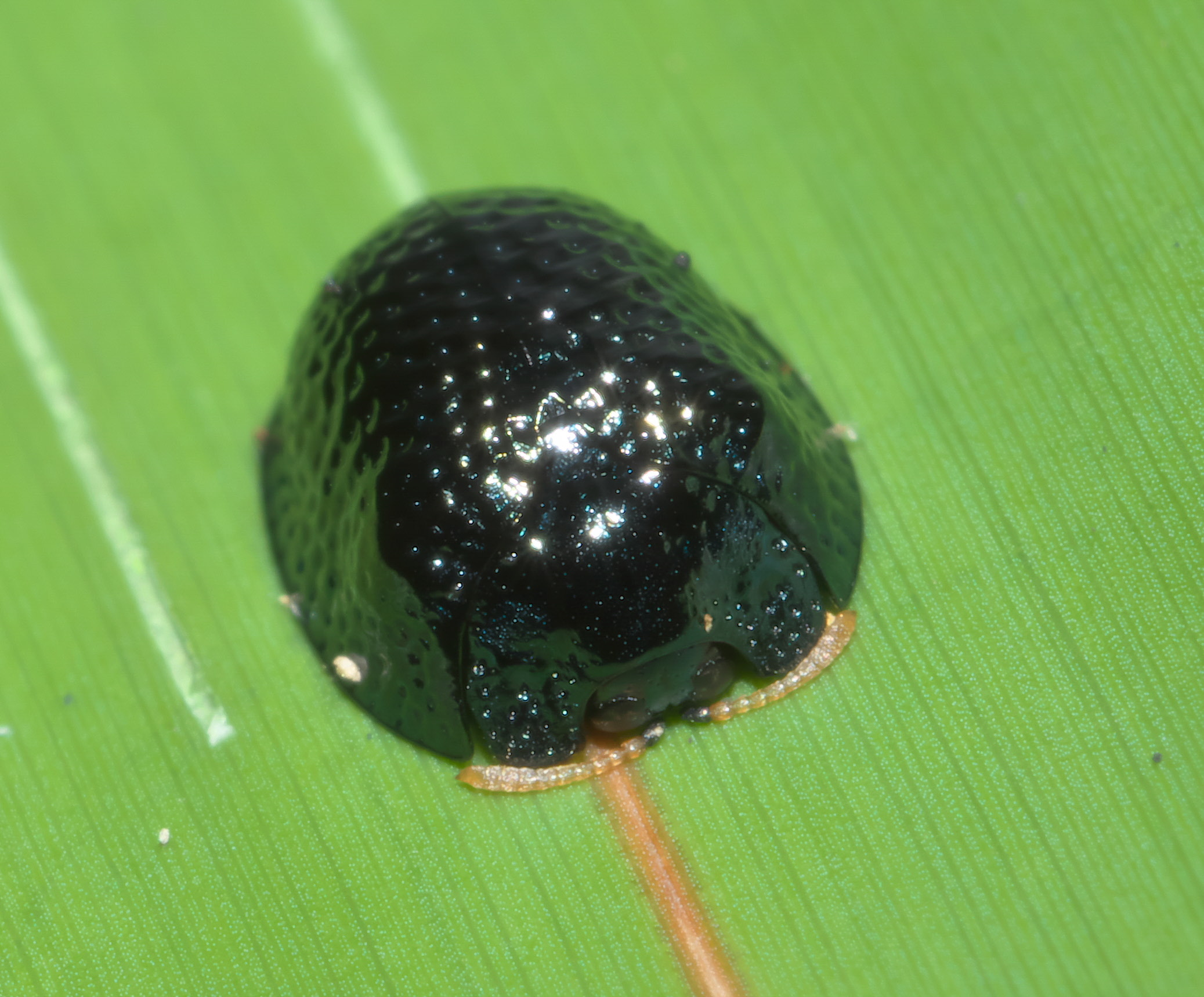
Hemisphaerota cyanea

Biology and morphology has been studied. The distribution range is circum-Caribbean.

== Species ==
These 10 species belong to the genus Hemisphaerota:

- Hemisphaerota besckei (Boheman, 1850)
- Hemisphaerota cyanea (Say, 1824) (palmetto tortoise beetle)
- Hemisphaerota fallax (Suffrian, 1868)
- Hemisphaerota flavipes Zayas, 1989
- Hemisphaerota gundlachi (Boheman, 1862)
- Hemisphaerota materna Zayas, 1952
- Hemisphaerota mulsanti (Boheman, 1856)
- Hemisphaerota palmarum (Boheman, 1856)
- Hemisphaerota quadrimaculata Blake
- Hemisphaerota xanthocera (Boheman, 1850)
