= Spaethiella tristis =

Scientific classification
- Kingdom: Animalia
- Phylum: Arthropoda
- Clade: Pancrustacea
- Class: Insecta
- Order: Coleoptera
- Suborder: Polyphaga
- Infraorder: Cucujiformia
- Family: Chrysomelidae
- Genus: Spaethiella
- Species: S. tristis

Binomial name
- Spaethiella tristis (Boheman, 1850)

Synonyms
- Porphyraspis tristis Boheman, 1850

Species of beetle

Spaethiella tristis is a species of beetle of the family Chrysomelidae. It is found in Brazil (Bahia, Minas Gerais, Pará, Santa Catarina, Pernambuco, São Paulo) and Ecuador.

== Life history ==
The recorded host plants are Cocos nucifera and Elaeis guineensis.
