= Spaethiella coccinea =

Scientific classification
- Kingdom: Animalia
- Phylum: Arthropoda
- Clade: Pancrustacea
- Class: Insecta
- Order: Coleoptera
- Suborder: Polyphaga
- Infraorder: Cucujiformia
- Family: Chrysomelidae
- Genus: Spaethiella
- Species: S. coccinea

Binomial name
- Spaethiella coccinea (Boheman, 1850)

Synonyms
- Porphyraspis coccinea Boheman, 1850

Species of beetle

Spaethiella coccinea is a species of beetle of the family Chrysomelidae. It is found in Brazil (Amazonas, Pará, Pernambuco), Colombia, Ecuador, French Guiana and Peru.
