= Spaethiella speculicollis =

Scientific classification
- Kingdom: Animalia
- Phylum: Arthropoda
- Clade: Pancrustacea
- Class: Insecta
- Order: Coleoptera
- Suborder: Polyphaga
- Infraorder: Cucujiformia
- Family: Chrysomelidae
- Genus: Spaethiella
- Species: S. speculicollis

Binomial name
- Spaethiella speculicollis (Spaeth, 1928)

Synonyms
- Hemisphaerota speculicollis Spaeth, 1928

Species of beetle

Spaethiella speculicollis is a species of beetle of the family Chrysomelidae. It is found in Brazil (Pernambuco, Santa Catarina, São Paulo) and Paraguay.
