= Spaethiella =

Scientific classification
- Kingdom: Animalia
- Phylum: Arthropoda
- Clade: Pancrustacea
- Class: Insecta
- Order: Coleoptera
- Suborder: Polyphaga
- Infraorder: Cucujiformia
- Family: Chrysomelidae
- Subfamily: Cassidinae
- Tribe: Hemisphaerotini
- Genus: Spaethiella; Barber & Bridwell, 1940

Genus of leaf beetles

Spaethiella is a genus of leaf beetles of the family Chrysomelidae.

== Species ==
- Spaethiella amazona (Spaeth, 1929)
- Spaethiella circumdata (Boheman, 1850)
- Spaethiella coccinea (Boheman, 1850)
- Spaethiella costipennis (Boheman, 1850)
- Spaethiella crassicornis (Spaeth, 1910)
- Spaethiella cyclica (Boheman, 1862)
- Spaethiella erhardti (Boheman, 1862)
- Spaethiella flavocincta (Spaeth, 1915)
- Spaethiella flexuosa (Champion, 1893)
- Spaethiella intricata (Boheman, 1850)
- Spaethiella laevicollis (Spaeth, 1910)
- Spaethiella marginata (Champion, 1893)
- Spaethiella miniata (Boheman, 1856)
- Spaethiella miranda (Spaeth, 1922)
- Spaethiella nigrina (Spaeth, 1910)
- Spaethiella picina (Boheman, 1862)
- Spaethiella puerula (Spaeth, 1910)
- Spaethiella pulchella (Baly, 1859)
- Spaethiella purpureocincta (Spaeth, 1929)
- Spaethiella quadrata (Spaeth, 1902)
- Spaethiella reismagalhaesi (Bondar, 1925)
- Spaethiella robusta (Spaeth, 1910)
- Spaethiella rotundior (Spaeth, 1929)
- Spaethiella rufocincta (Spaeth, 1928)
- Spaethiella rugosa (Boheman, 1850)
- Spaethiella sanguinea (Fabricius, 1801)
- Spaethiella speculicollis (Spaeth, 1928)
- Spaethiella sublaevis (Spaeth, 1901)
- Spaethiella submetallica (Spaeth, 1928)
- Spaethiella surinamensis (Spaeth, 1929)
- Spaethiella transversata (Spaeth, 1928)
- Spaethiella tristis (Boheman, 1850)
- Spaethiella valida (Spaeth, 1901)
