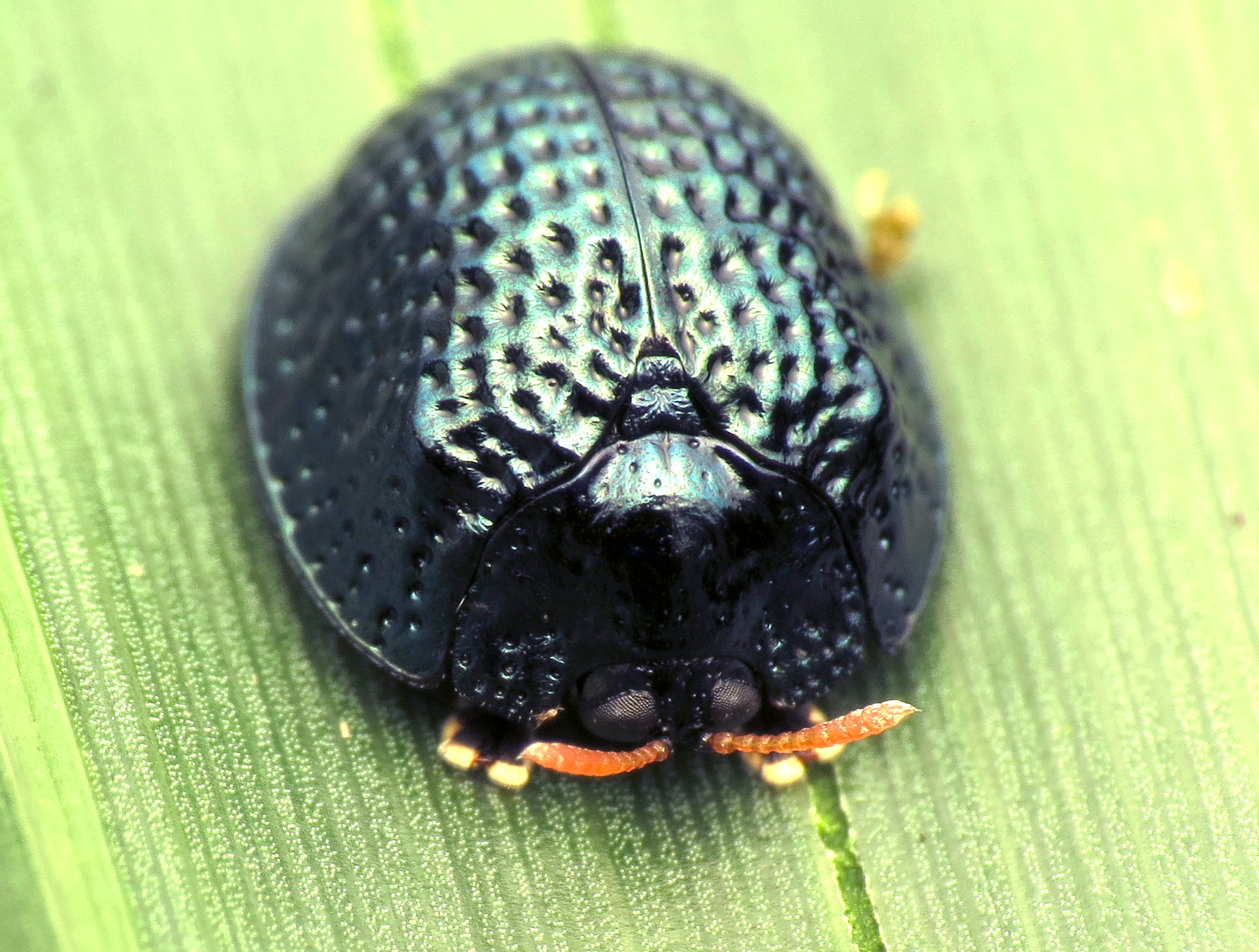
- In Brevard County, Florida

Scientific classification
- Kingdom: Animalia
- Phylum: Arthropoda
- Clade: Pancrustacea
- Class: Insecta
- Order: Coleoptera
- Suborder: Polyphaga
- Infraorder: Cucujiformia
- Family: Chrysomelidae
- Tribe: Hemisphaerotini
- Genus: Hemisphaerota
- Species: H. cyanea

Binomial name
- Hemisphaerota cyanea (Say, 1824)

Synonyms
- Imatidium cyaneum Say, 1824

= Hemisphaerota cyanea =

Species of beetle

Hemisphaerota cyanea, also known as the palmetto tortoise beetle, is a species in the Chrysomelidae (leaf beetle) family. Beetles in this family are commonly characterized by their small size (usually less than 13 mm), relatively oval and convex shape, variable color but often shining/ iridescent bodies, small heads, and 5-jointed tarsi. Other names include the Florida tortoise beetle and iridescent blue chrysomelid beetle. It is native to the southeastern United States. The specific name (cyanea) means "dark blue", and the beetle earned its name as the palmetto tortoise beetle because it is the only tortoise beetle that feeds on palms.

== Morphology ==
The palmetto tortoise beetle is a small beetle growing 4.6–5.6 mm (0.18–0.22 in) in length. The coloring of the elytra (hardened outer wings) and pronotum (a prominent plate-like structure covering the thorax) is a dark, metallic blue or purple. The beetle has a hemispherical dome shape. The antennae are short and enlarged at the tips; they are orange in color except for the black basal segments. The tarsi (foot or contact surface of the leg) are large. Each of these tarsi holds around 10,000 adhesive bristles, and each bristle contains two terminal pads.

== Distribution ==
The palmetto tortoise beetle is primarily found in the southeastern United States and has been recorded in Florida, Georgia, Alabama, Texas, Louisiana, and Mississippi. The palmetto tortoise beetle is most commonly found on the native saw palmetto, Serenoa repens. However, the beetles also feed and reside on the cabbage palm, Sabal palmetto, the dwarf palmetto, Sabal minor, and the scrub palmetto, Sable etonia.

== Life cycle and behavior ==
Larva of the palmetto tortoise beetle hide under a nest-like covering of thin strands of frass (fecal matter). They pupate inside of these fecal shelters. The adults hold themselves on fronds of palmettos with thousands of microscopic bristles on their tarsi ("feet"), paired with an oil that makes them difficult to pry off the leaves. Both the larva and adults of Hemisphaerota cyanea feed on palmetto plants (Sabal species).

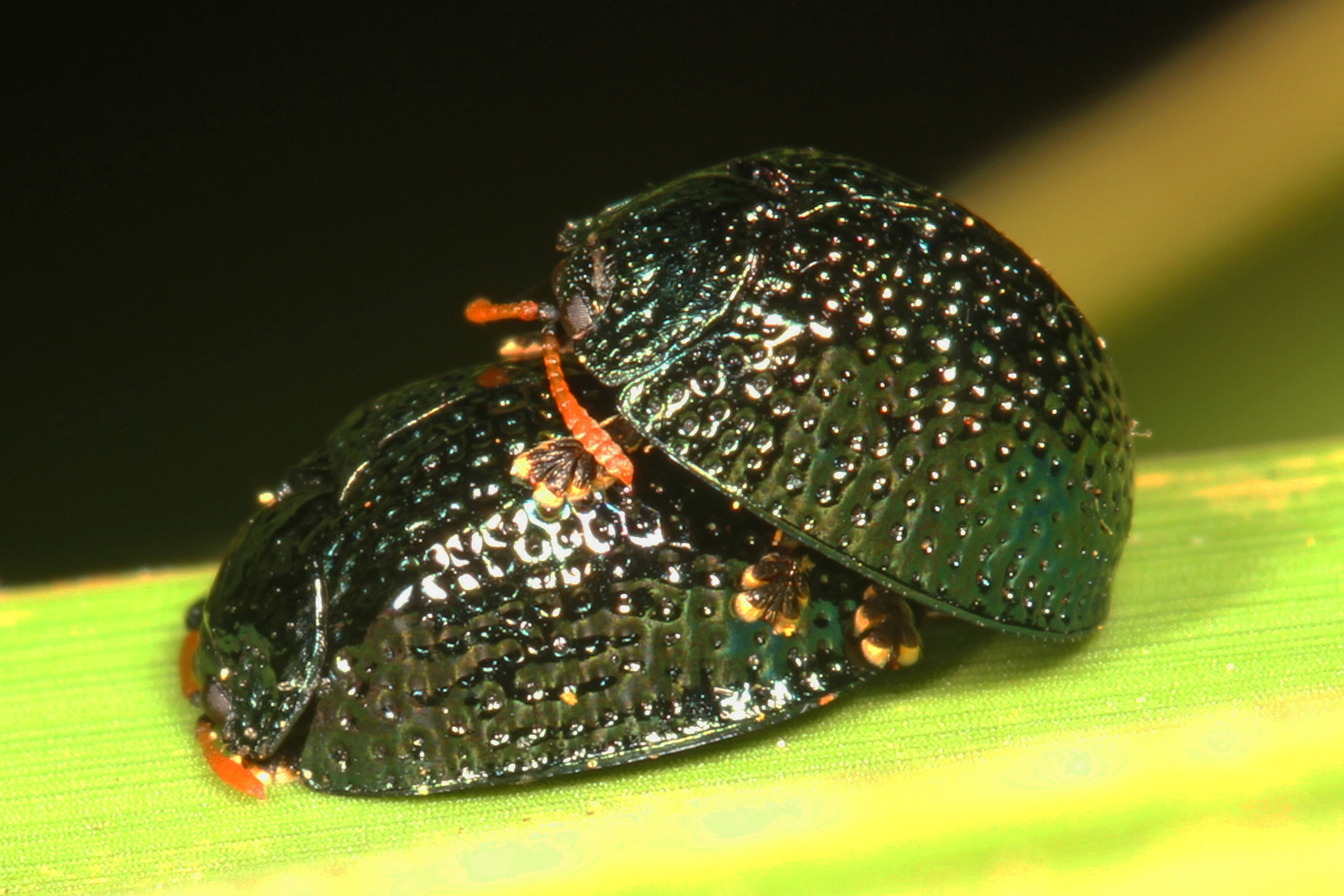
Mating pair in Georgia

The female palmetto tortoise beetle lays yellow, elongated eggs in March to mid-April. She cements the eggs to host leaves and covers them with a fecal covering that protects them from predators and parasitoids.

Upon hatching, the young larva begin to create a shield using fecal matter. Larvae have an "anal fork" which the strands are fastened to in order to hold them in place. This fecal thatch is an effective defense against predators such as lady bugs and stink bugs. The larvae cause damage to leaves, but they rarely cause significant damage to trees.

When they reach maturity, the larva will cling to the leaf surface and pupate under the fecal thatch. A week later, the new adults will emerge. Palmetto tortoise beetle larvae and pupae are found in mid to late summer, and adults are found all year long.

== Adhesion ==
Beetle anatomy diagram

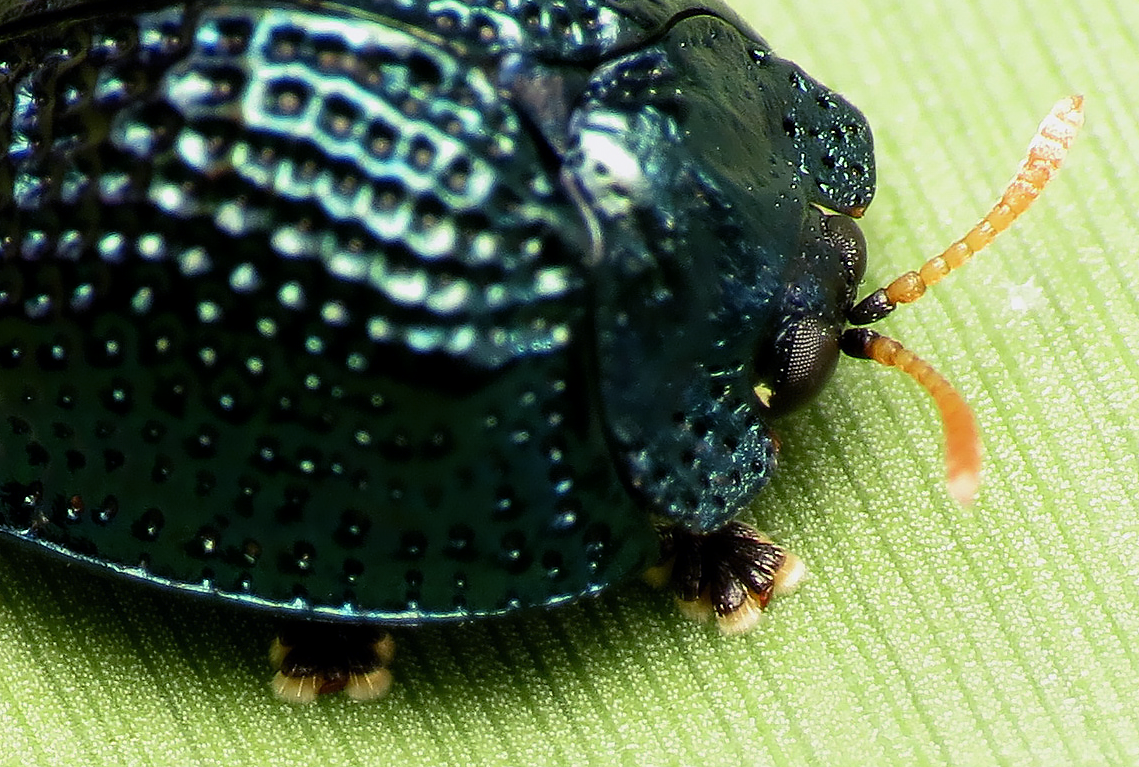
Closeup of tarsi

Probably the most well-known and notable characteristic of the palmetto tortoise beetle is its ability to cling tenaciously to its leaf when one attempts to pick it off. This unique defense mechanism is due to the beetle's adhesive bristles found on its tarsi. Tarsi are the feet or contact surfaces of each leg, essentially the "sole" of the beetle's foot (see beetle anatomy diagram to the right). Palmetto tortoise beetles have oversized tarsi that are made up of three tarsomeres (tarsal segments) on each of their six legs. Each of these tarsomeres are densely packed with adhesive bristles. Each tarsus contains around 10,000 bristles so collectively, the six tarsi together bear over 60,000 adhesive bristles, each of which is forked at the end and contains two terminal pads. When walking, the beetle will only touch a small fraction of the adhesive bristles to the leaf or substrate, essentially "tip-toeing" as it moves across the surface. However, when disturbed or assaulted by a predator, the beetle will firmly press all of its tarsi flatly down, allowing nearly all of the adhesive bristles to press against the substrate.

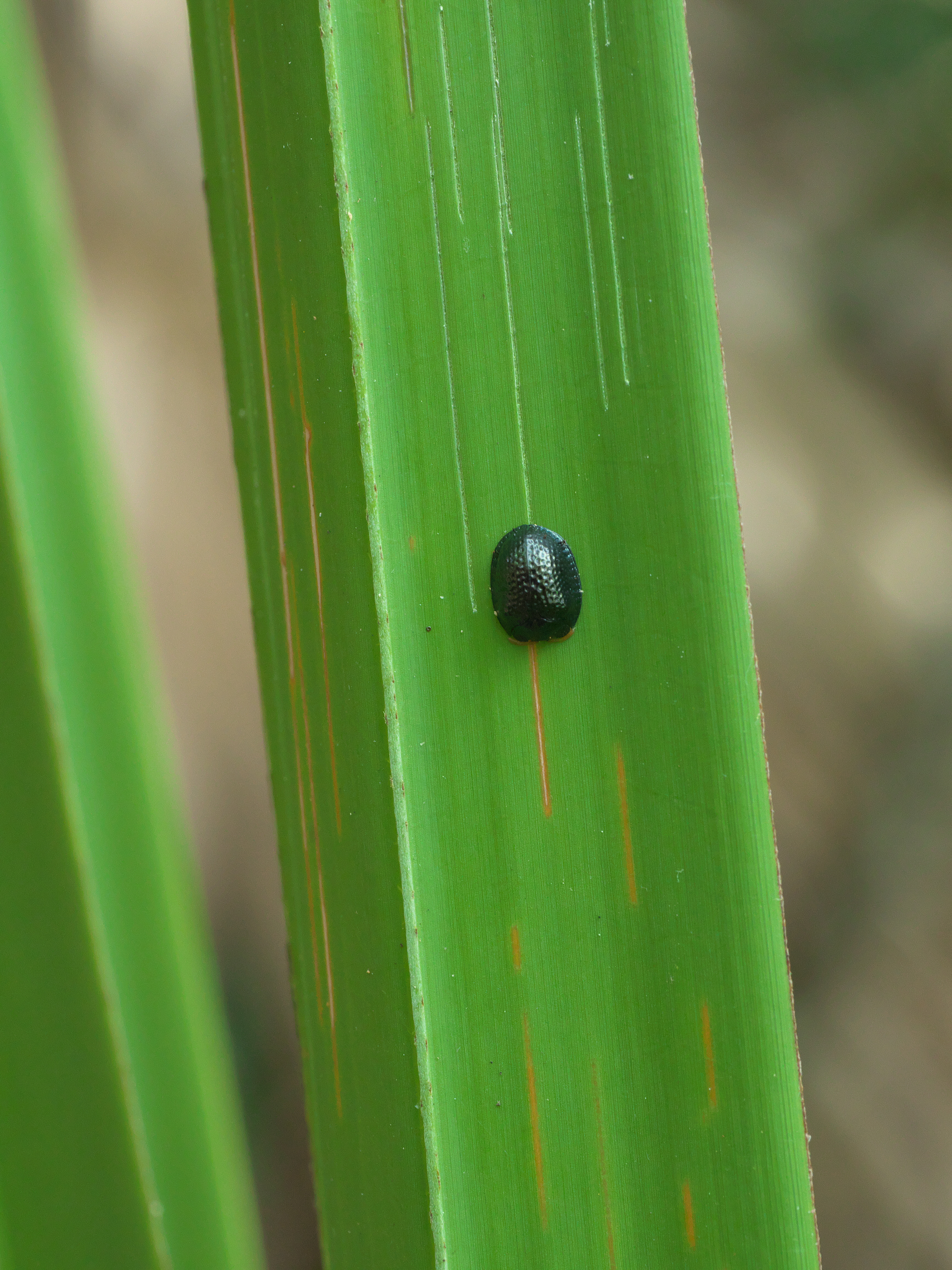
Palmetto tortoise beetle adhering to substrate

Furthermore, scanning electron microscopy has revealed the presence of small circular pores distributed irregularly throughout the base of the bristles. These pores are glandular openings from which tarsal oil is secreted to secure adhesion. The oil emerges from the pores and then seeps by capillarity into narrow clefts between the rows of bristles, slides onward to the bristle tips, and allows the now pre wetted pads to make contact with the substrate when the tarsi touch down.

This allows the palmetto tortoise beetle to adhere to its leaf or substrate in such a way that it can withstand pulling forces of up to .8 grams, which is approximately 60 times its own body mass, for two minutes. The beetle can also withstand pulling forces of higher magnitudes (up to 3 grams) for shorter periods of time.

== Fecal thatches ==
The larvae of tortoise beetles (Chrysomelidae) have a habit involving feces. Instead of getting rid of their fecal waste in a conventional fashion, they employ mechanisms to allow their waste to accumulate into a shield of sorts. The palmetto tortoise beetle has one of the most impressive fecal "thatches" of all tortoise beetles. The larvae of this beetle emit feces in strands that build up over the course of larval life—forming a loose assemblage that completely hides the larva from view.

=== Thatch construction ===
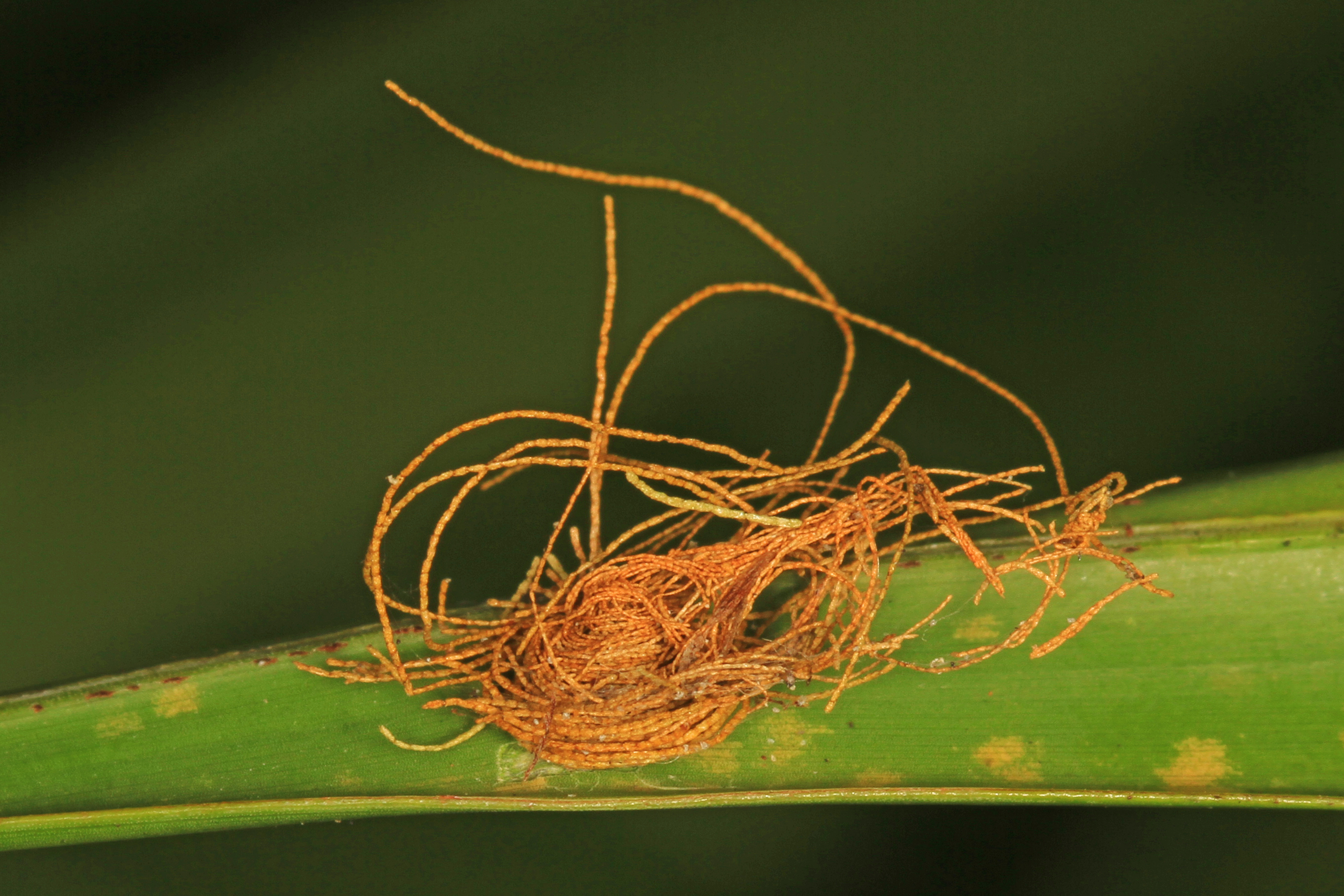
Palmetto tortoise beetle fecal thatch

Within just a few minutes of hatching, the larva begins feeding. Minutes later, the first fecal strand emerges from the anal turret (a protrusible muscular anus that can be rotated). Subsequent fecal strands will follow in quick succession. After twelve hours, the thatch will be fully formed. The first two strands are relatively short, but the following strands will be longer and coiled. While a fecal strand is being produced, the larva will keep the anal turret flexed, either to the right or left, to allow the strands to curve around either the right or left side of the larva's body. "Right hand" and "left hand" strands are typically produced in alternation.

The caudal fork (located above the anal turret) is another essential part of thatch construction; it is the fork that individual fecal strands are fastened to upon completion. When a strand has been excreted to its full length, the larva will rotate the anal turret upwards until it contacts the fork. The turret will then secret a droplet of a sticky adherence substance while also pinching off the fecal strand through anal constriction. The "glue" hardens quickly, cementing the fecal strand to the fork. Strands are cemented next to each other on the caudal fork.

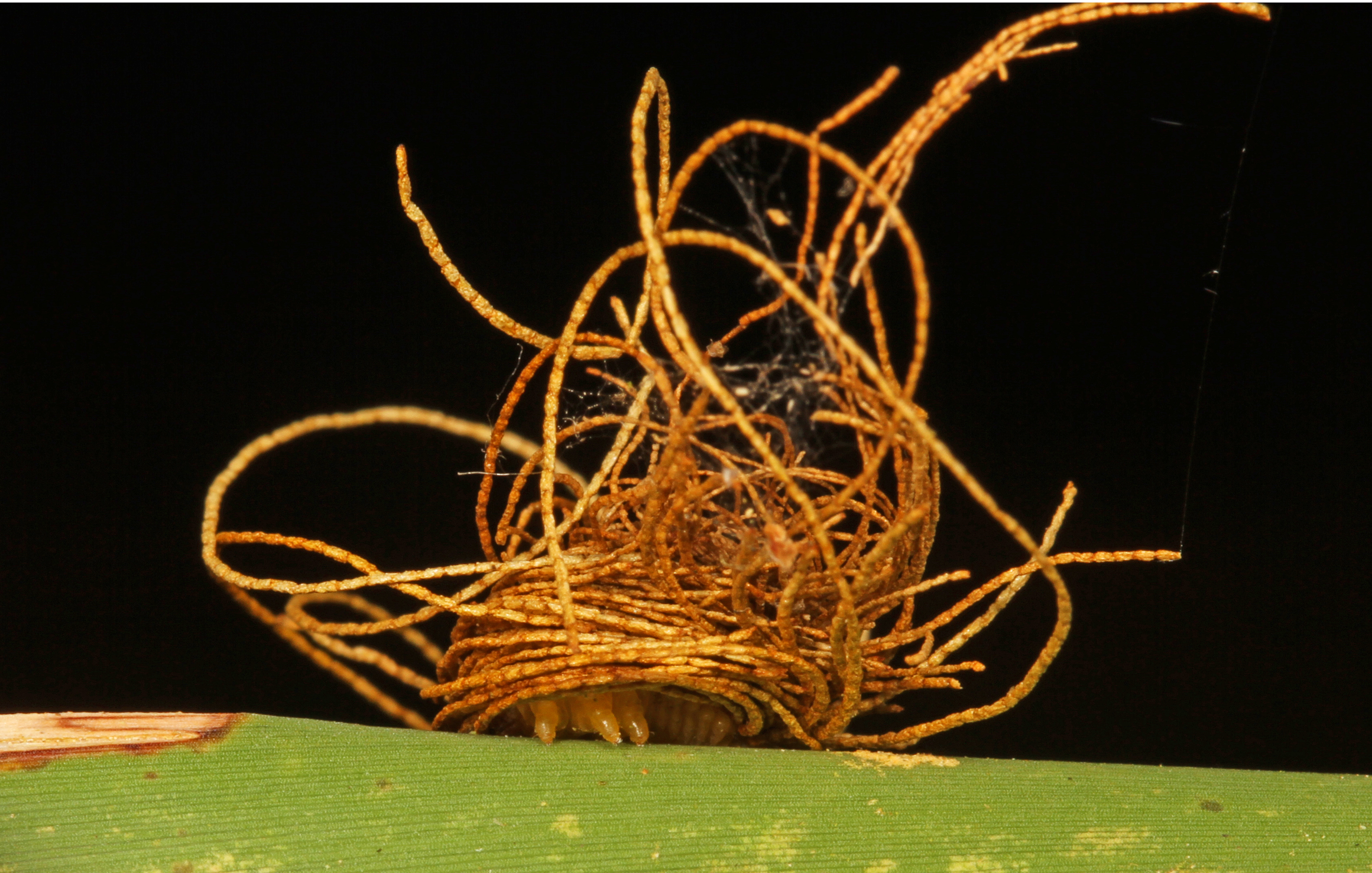
Larva under a fecal thatch

The caudal fork is not shed at molting; instead, it is retained as a terminal extension of the newly formed fork of the subsequent instar stage. By the end of larval development, the fork is a composite structure made up of the individual forks of each instar that fit over each other like stacked hats. Because of this, the oldest and narrowest fecal strands, produced when the larva was the youngest, make up the domed central portion of the thatch while the thicker and more recent strands line the outer covering of the thatch. Microscopic examination has shown the fecal strands to be membrane-coated or encased in "skin" like sausages which makes them less susceptible to breakage.

=== Defense ===
Once the fecal thatch is constructed, the larva is both concealed and physically shielded. Another crucial aspect of this defense mechanism is the fact that the larva and its fecal thatch are anchored to the plant/ substrate at essentially all times. The sharp tarsal claws of the larvae are inserted into the substrate to provide this anchorage. Significant leverage is required to pry a larva loose from its leaf. The larva is more vulnerable when it is mobile, but it hardly ever is. When feeding, the larva will move extremely slow without ever disengaging all of its tarsal claws from the substrate at once.

Through postural movements of the body, the larva can use its thatch as an active defensive tool. By flexing and rotating the caudal fork on the abdominal tip (where all the fecal strands are anchored to), the larva can tilt the thatch to the right or left if one side of the thatch is poked/ disturbed. The larva can also shift the thatch upward or downward, depending on where the disturbance is coming from.

== Predators ==
=== Predators of adult palmetto tortoise beetles ===
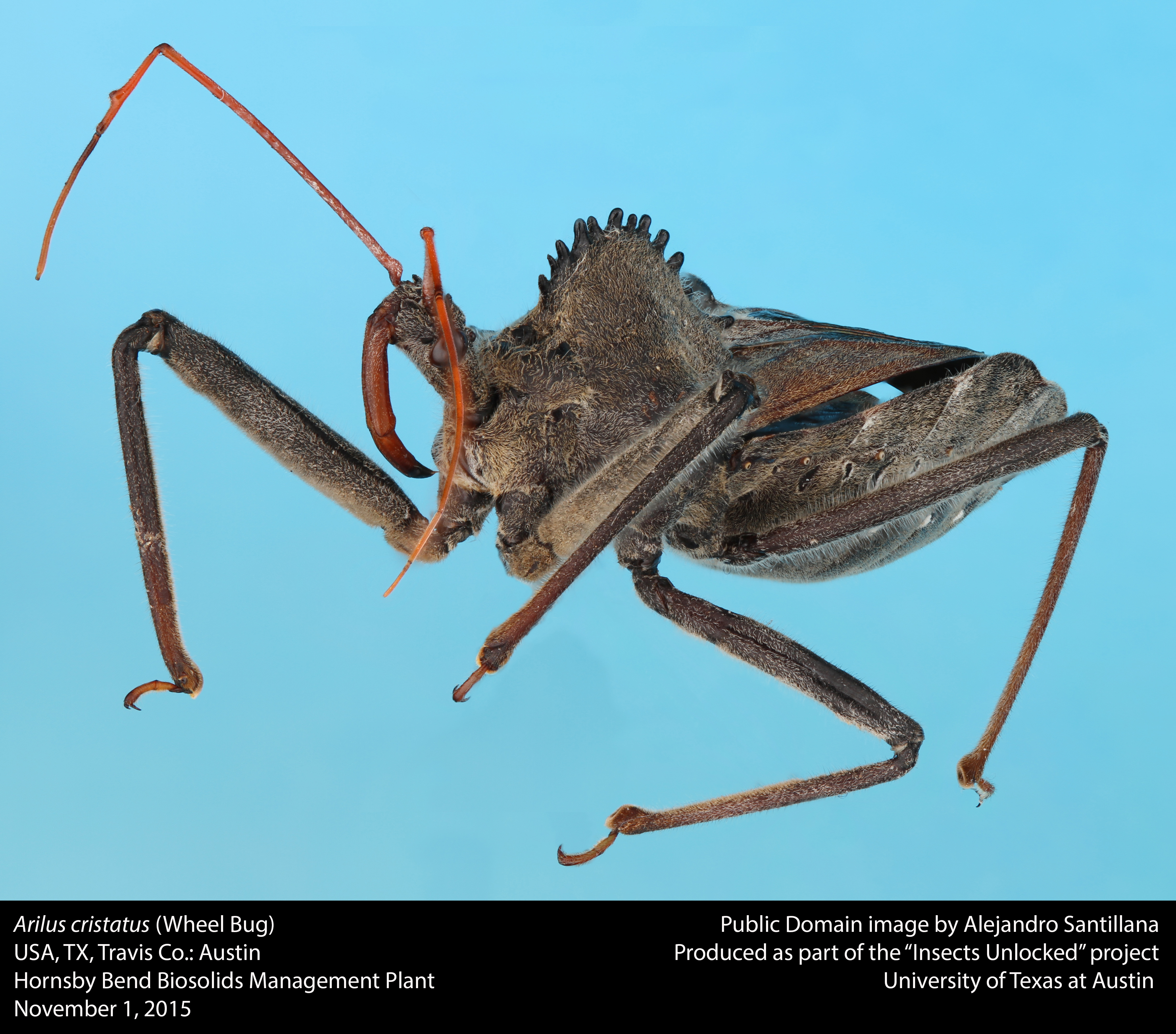
Arilus cristatus

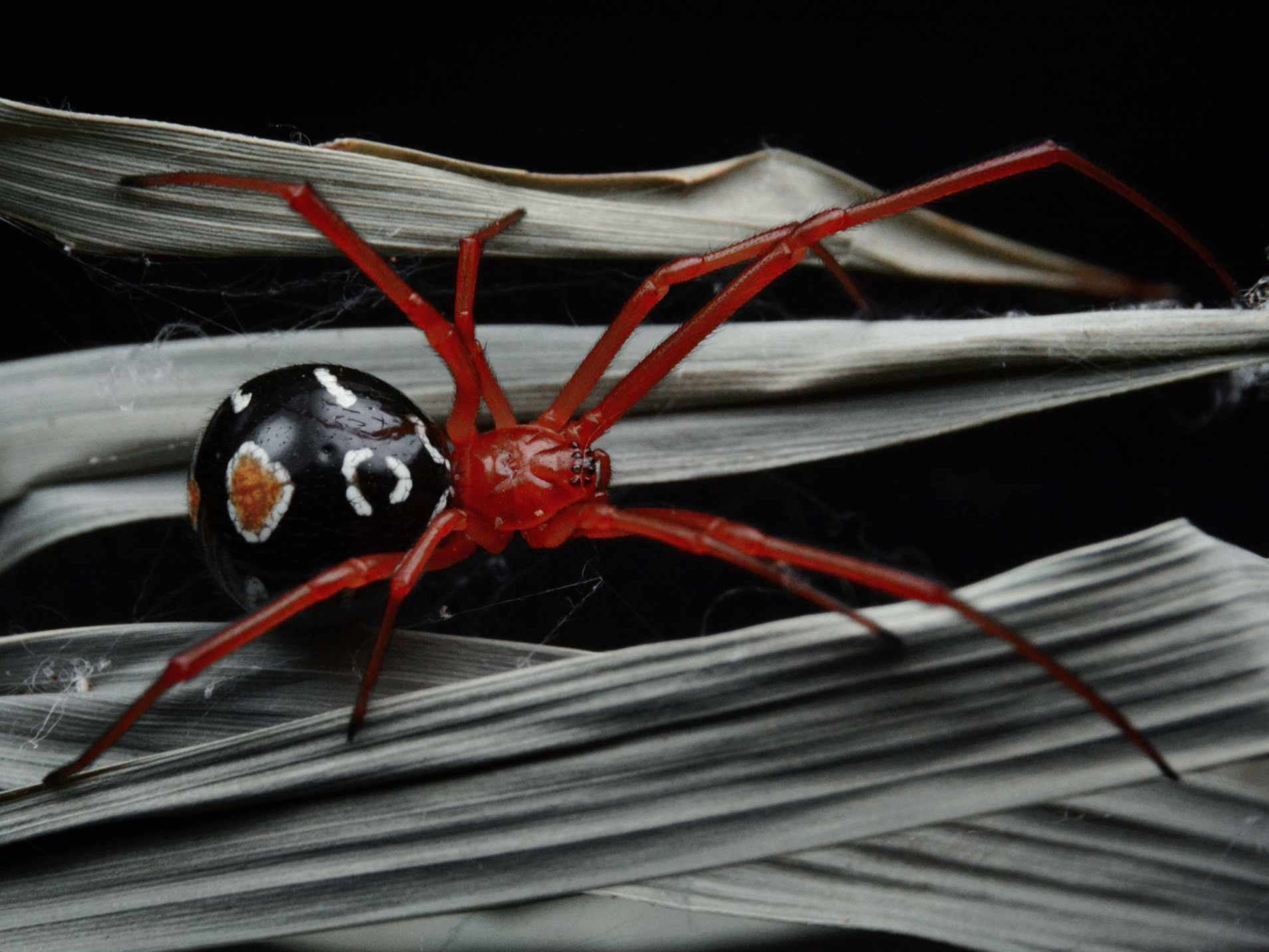
Latrodectus bishopi

Adhesive bristles and adhesion strength are an effective defense mechanism against attacking ants because the palmetto tortoise beetle is able to cling to the leaf more persistently than the ants can persist in their attack. However, adhesion is not a reliable mechanism to defend against the assassin bug Arilus cristatus which overcomes the beetle's chemical and mechanical adhesive defenses by piercing the body with its sharp rostrum (beaklike projection on the head of an insect). Arilus cristatus then injects venom, paralyzing the muscles of the palmetto tortoise beetle which prevents the beetle from maintaining its tarsal hold on the substrate and allows the assassin bug to feed on the beetle. The female red widow spider, or Latrodectus bishopi, is another successful predator of the palmetto tortoise beetle. The red widow spider attacks these beetles after they wander into her web and is able to both transport them and feed on them. Arilus cristatus and Latrodectus bishopi are the only two known predators of adult palmetto tortoise beetles.

=== Predators of larval stage palmetto tortoise beetles ===
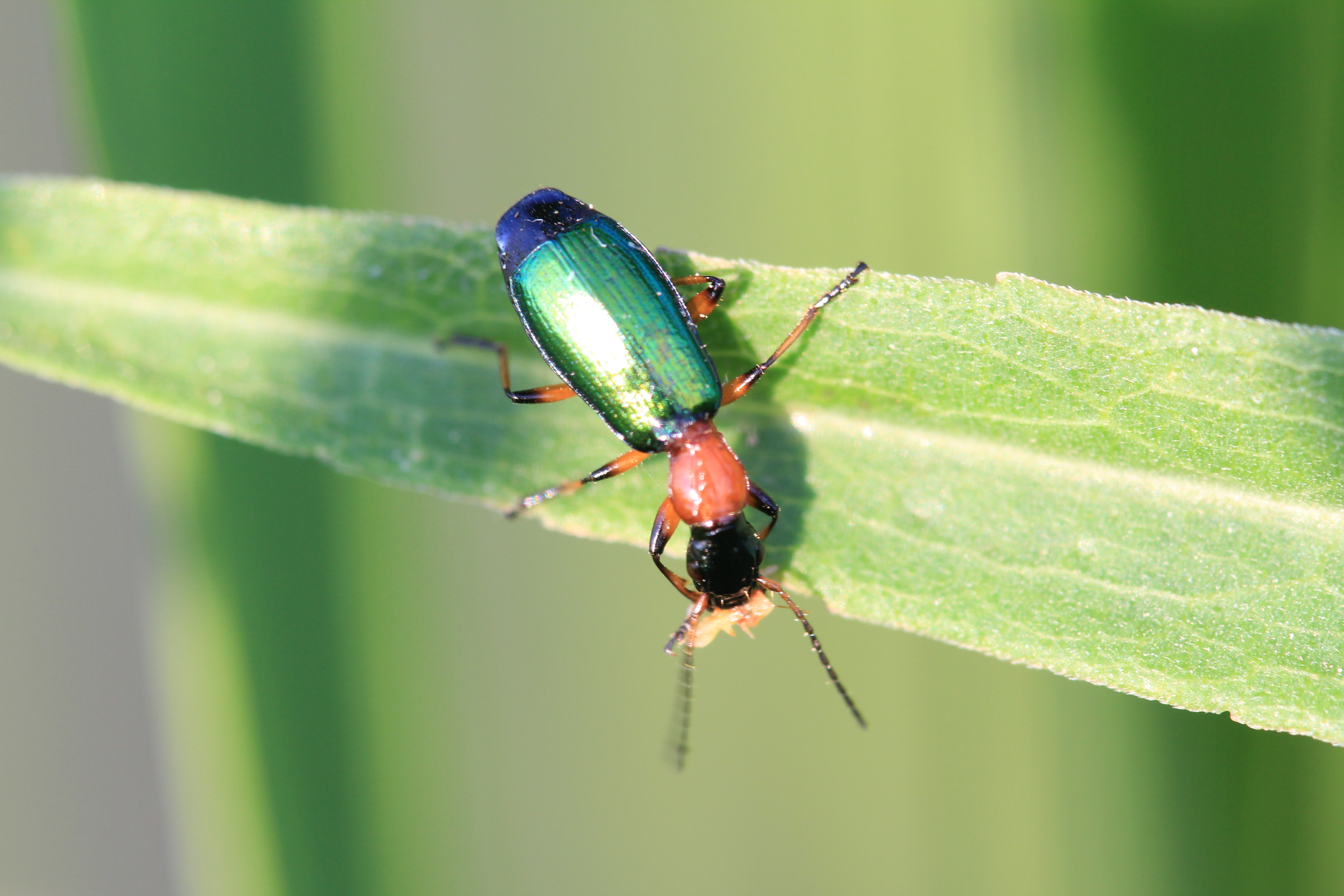
Calleida beetle

Palmetto tortoise beetle larvae are well adapted for survival; the tarsal claw anchorage, possession of a fecal thatch, and maneuverability of the fecal thatch allow for relatively effective defense against predators. Predators known to be deterred by these mechanisms are ants, coccinellid larva, and the predaceous pentatomid. However, Calleida beetles are able to circumvent the defensive thatch of the palmetto tortoise beetle larvae. A Calleida beetle will attack either by forcing its head through a gap in the thatch or biting its way through the top of the thatch and reaching the larvae from above; they will then eat the entire larva except for the anal turret.
