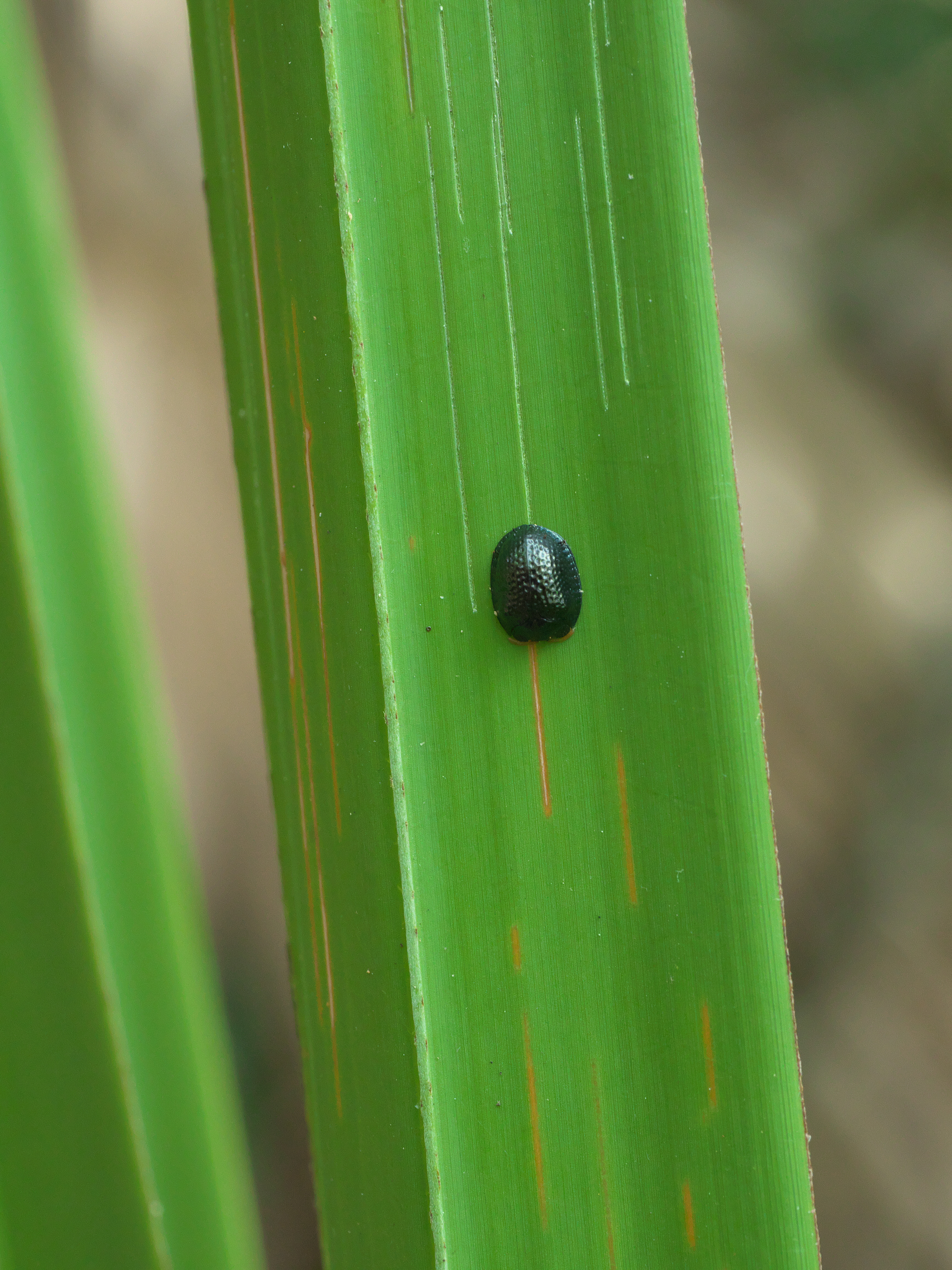
- Hemisphaerota cyanea

Scientific classification
- Kingdom: Animalia
- Phylum: Arthropoda
- Clade: Pancrustacea
- Class: Insecta
- Order: Coleoptera
- Suborder: Polyphaga
- Infraorder: Cucujiformia
- Family: Chrysomelidae
- Subfamily: Cassidinae
- Tribe: Hemisphaerotini; Monrós & Viana, 1951

= Hemisphaerotini =

Tribe of beetles

Hemisphaerotini is a Neotropical tribe of tortoise beetles and hispines in the family Chrysomelidae. There are 2 genera and more than 40 described species in Hemisphaerotini.

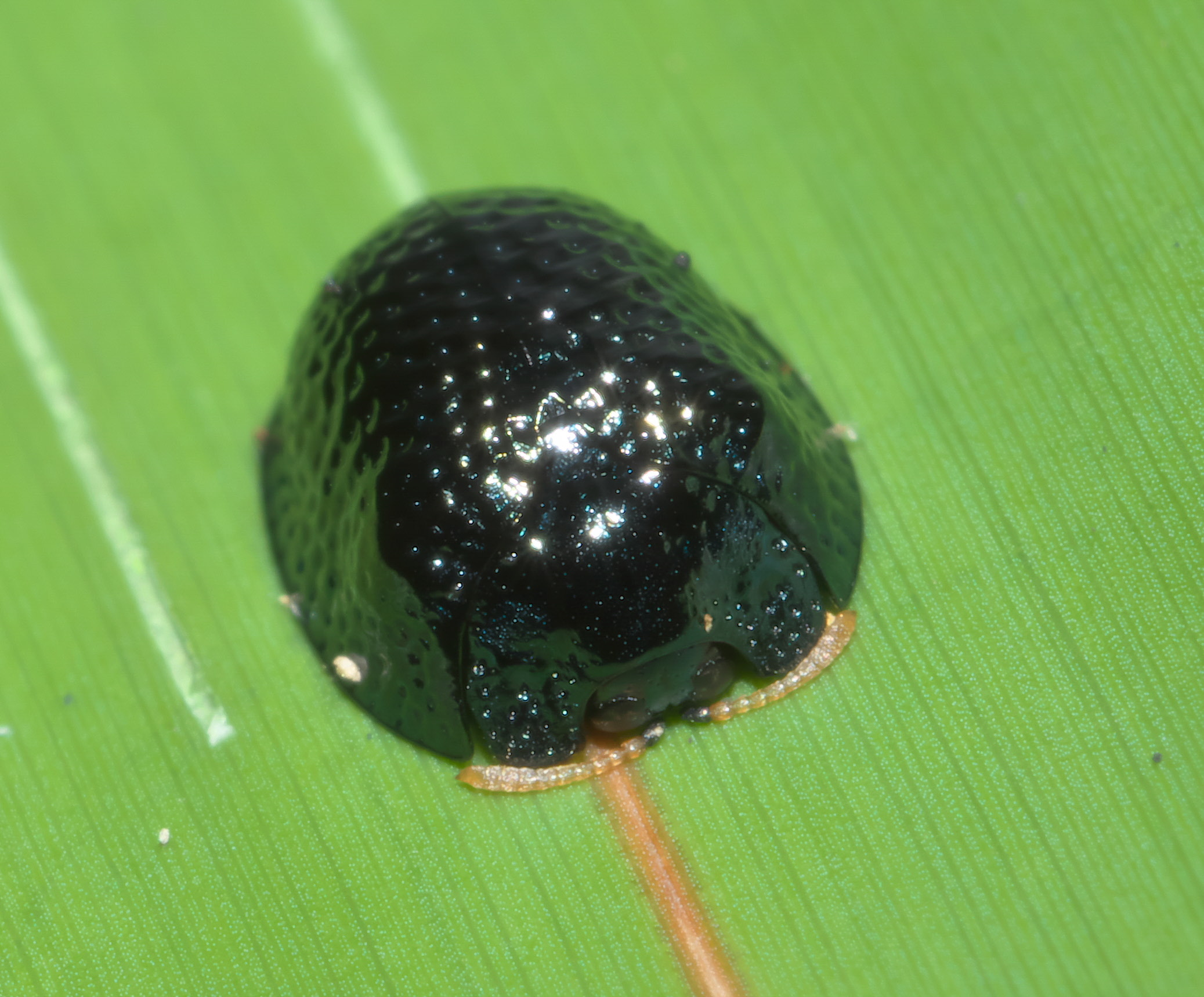
Hemisphaerota cyanea

The eggs, larvae and pupae have been described.

== Genera ==
These two genera belong to the tribe Hemisphaerotini:

- Hemisphaerota Chevrolat in Dejean, 1836
- Spaethiella Barber & Bridwell, 1940
