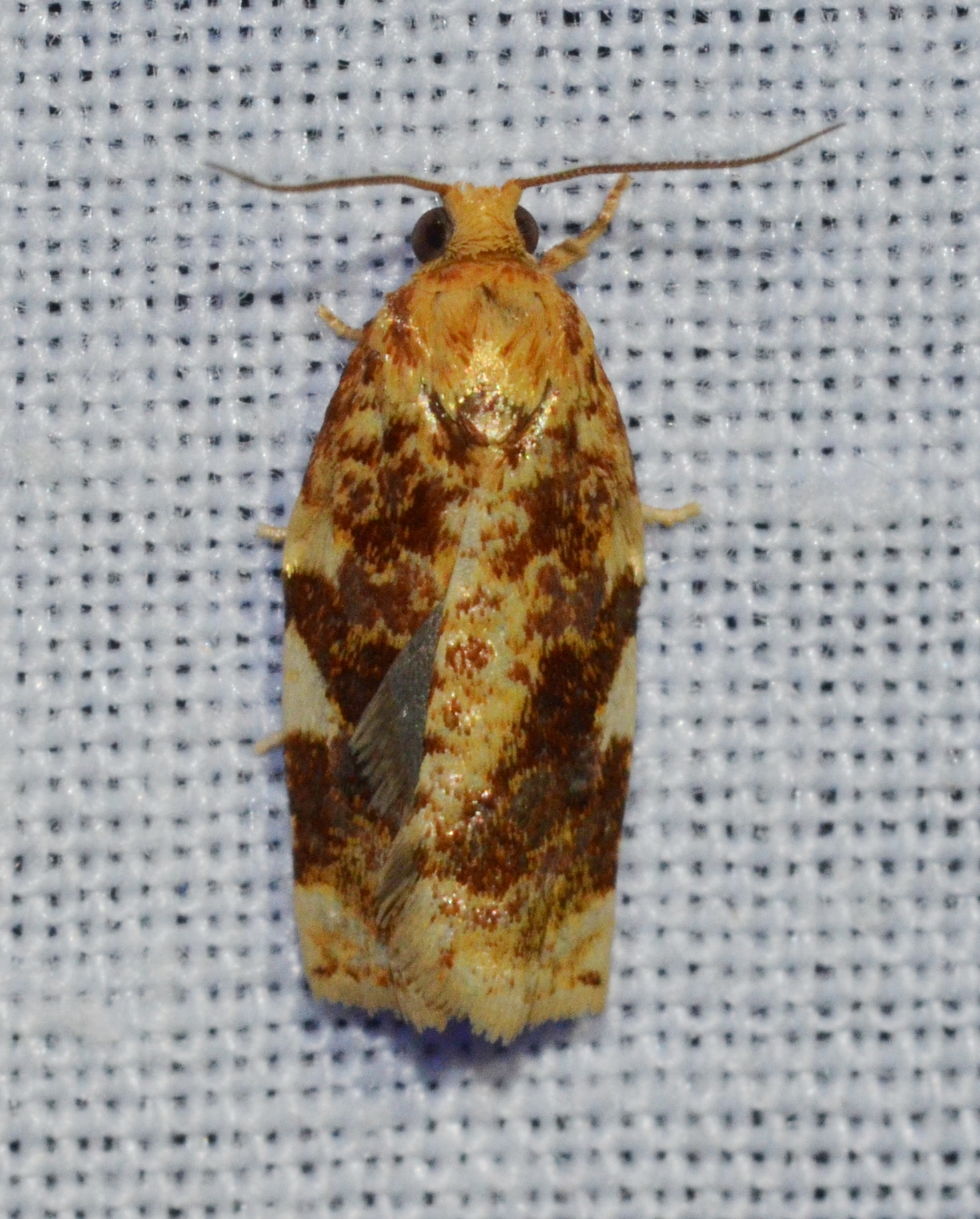
- Adult
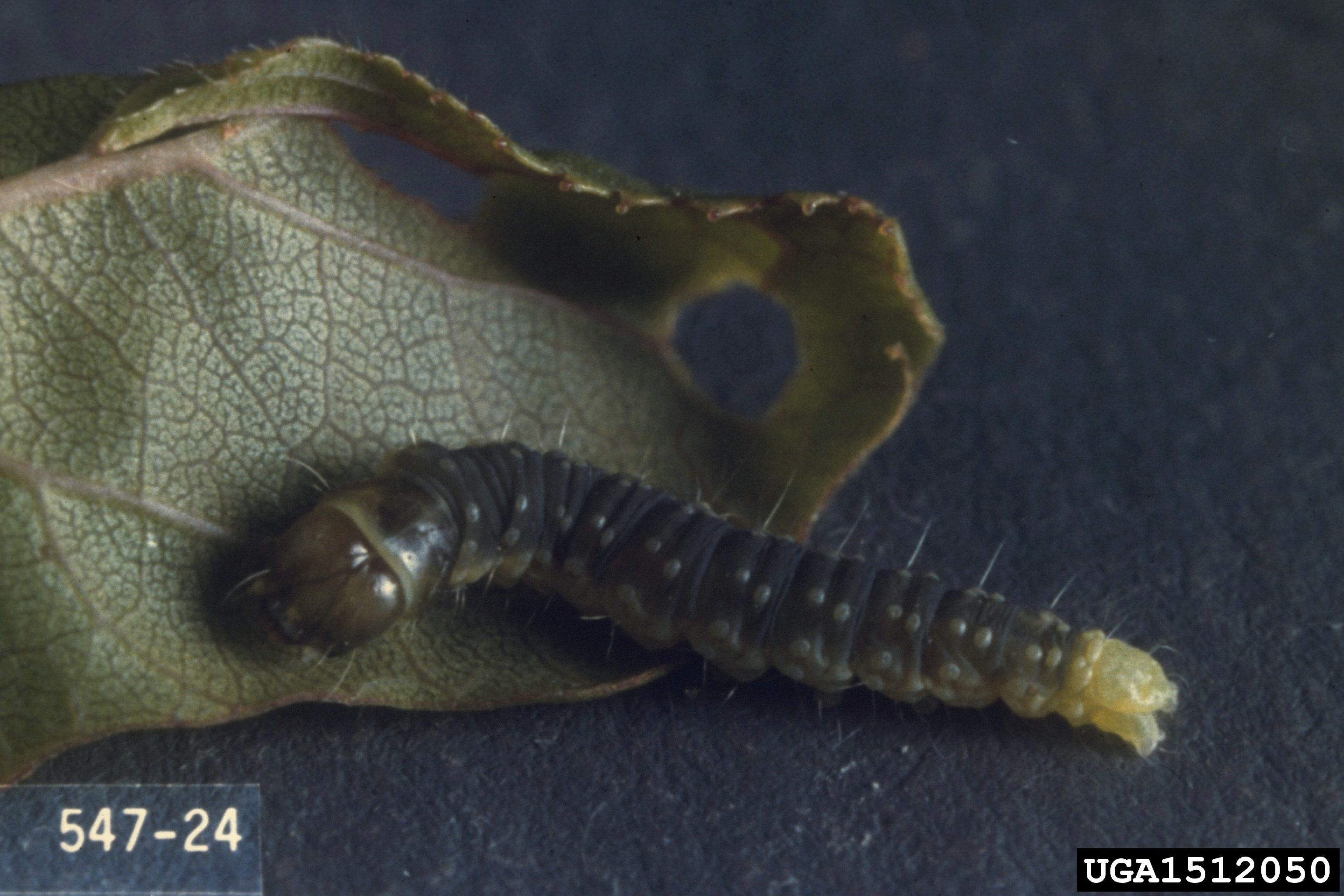
- Larva

Scientific classification
- Kingdom: Animalia
- Phylum: Arthropoda
- Clade: Pancrustacea
- Class: Insecta
- Order: Lepidoptera
- Family: Tortricidae
- Genus: Archips
- Species: A. argyrospila

Binomial name
- Archips argyrospila (Walker, 1863)

Synonyms
- Retinia argyrospila Walker, 1863; Cacoecia columbiana McDunnough, 1923; Tortrix furvana Robinson, 1869; Cacoecia vividana Dyar, 1902; Tortrix vsignatana Packard, 1875

= Archips argyrospila =

Fruit-tree leafroller moth

Species of moth

Archips argyrospila, the fruit-tree leafroller moth, is a moth of the family Tortricidae. It is found in most of the United States and southern Canada.

The length of the forewings is 6–10.2 mm for males and 8.5–11.7 mm for females. Adults are on wing from mid May to July in one generation per year.

The larvae feed on a wide range of plants and are considered a pest on apples and pears. Recorded host plants include: Medicago, Malus, Prunus, Taxodium distichum, Phaseolus, Vaccinium, Betula, Acer negundo, Aesculus, Ceanothus, Cercocarpus, Citrus, Quercus, Eriodictyon, Vitis, Crataegus, Carya, Gleditsia triacanthos, Humulus, Syringa, Avena, Allium, Maclura pomifera, Pyrus, Rheum, Sassafras and Juglans species.
