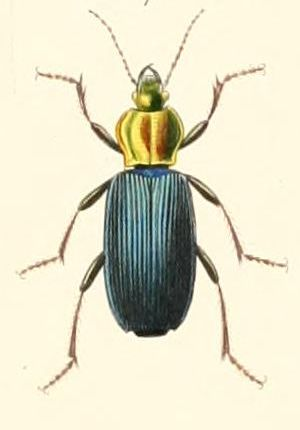
- Calleida amethystina

Scientific classification
- Kingdom: Animalia
- Phylum: Arthropoda
- Class: Insecta
- Order: Coleoptera
- Suborder: Adephaga
- Family: Carabidae
- Subfamily: Lebiinae
- Tribe: Lebiini
- Genus: Calleida; Latreille, 1824

Subgenera
- Calleida Latreille, 1824; Callidiola Jeannel, 1949; Stenocallida Jeannel, 1949

Diversity
- at least 300 species

= Calleida =

Genus of beetles

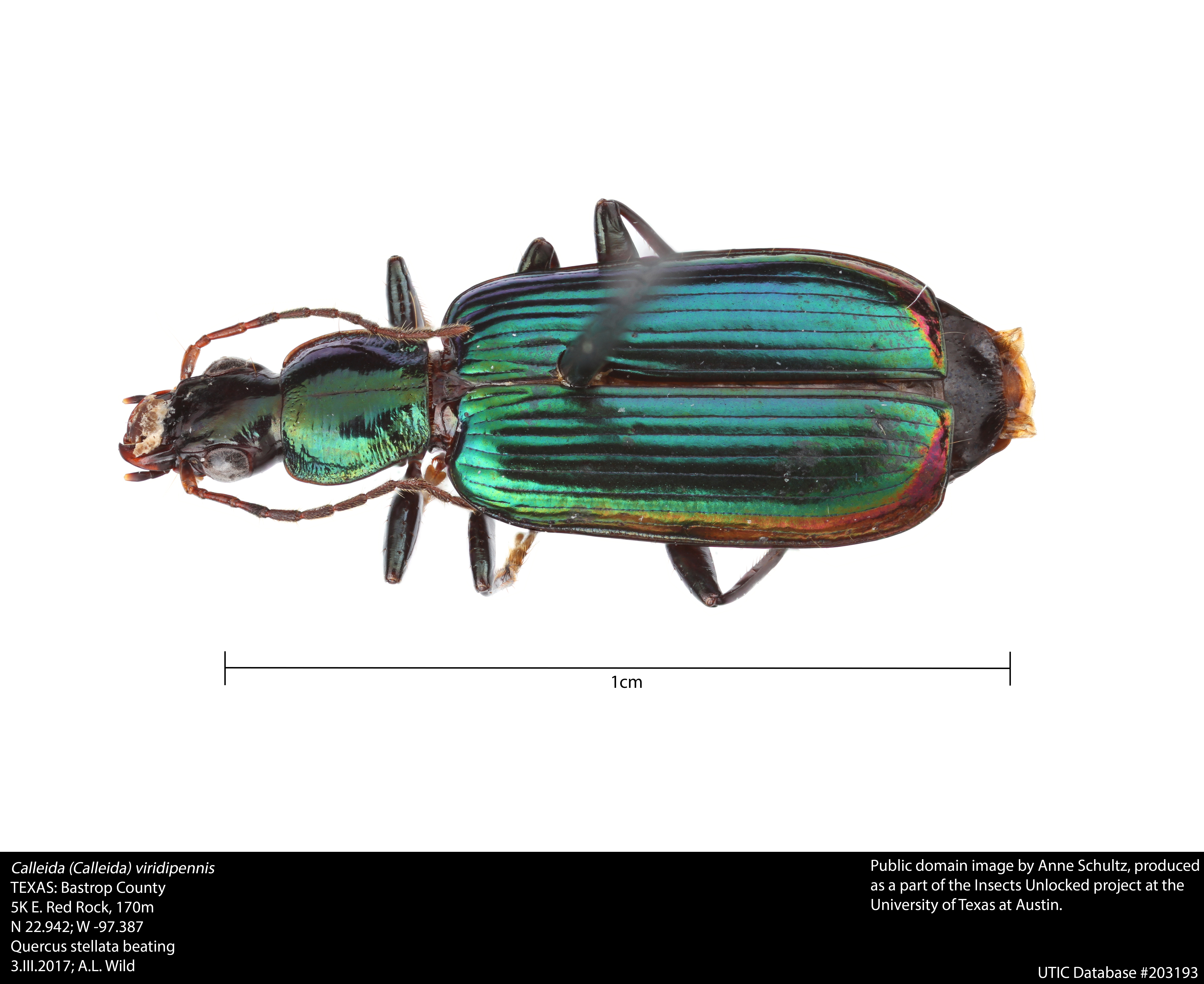
Calleida viridipennis

Calleida is a genus of beetles in the family Carabidae. The genus has more than 300 species.

== See also ==
- List of Calleida species
