= List of Pisauridae species =

This article lists all described species of the spider family Pisauridae accepted by the World Spider Catalog as of February 2021:

== A ==
=== Afropisaura ===
Afropisaura Blandin, 1976

- A. ducis (Strand, 1913) — West, Central, East Africa
- A. rothiformis (Strand, 1908) — West, Central, East Africa
- A. valida (Simon, 1886) (type) — West, Central Africa

=== Archipirata ===
Archipirata Simon, 1898

- A. tataricus Simon, 1898 (type) — Turkmenistan, China

=== Architis ===
Architis Simon, 1898

- A. altamira Santos, 2007 — Brazil
- A. amazonica (Simon, 1898) — Brazil
- A. brasiliensis (Mello-Leitão, 1940) — Brazil
- A. capricorna Carico, 1981 — Brazil, Argentina
- A. catuaba Santos, 2008 — Brazil, Peru
- A. colombo Santos, 2007 — Brazil
- A. comaina Santos, 2007 — Peru
- A. cymatilis Carico, 1981 — Trinidad, Colombia to Brazil
- A. dianasilvae Santos, 2007 — Peru
- A. erwini Santos, 2007 — Ecuador
- A. fritzmuelleri Santos, 2007 — Brazil
- A. gracilis Santos, 2008 — Brazil
- A. helveola (Simon, 1898) — Colombia, Ecuador, Brazil
- A. ikuruwa Carico, 1981 — Guyana, Suriname, Peru, Bolivia
- A. maturaca Santos, 2007 — Brazil
- A. neblina Santos & Nogueira, 2008 — Brazil
- A. robusta Carico, 1981 — Panama, Brazil
- A. spinipes (Taczanowski, 1874) — Panama, Trinidad to Argentina
- A. tenuipes (Simon, 1898) — Brazil
- A. tenuis Simon, 1898 (type) — Panama to Brazil
- A. turvo Santos, 2007 — Brazil

== B ==
=== Blandinia ===
Blandinia Tonini, Paulo da Silva, Serpa Filho & Freitas, 2016

- B. mahasoana (Blandin, 1979) (type) — Madagascar

== C ==
=== Caripetella ===
Caripetella Strand, 1928

- C. madagascariensis (Lenz, 1886) (type) — Madagascar, Comoros

=== Charminus ===
Charminus Thorell, 1899

- C. aethiopicus (Caporiacco, 1939) — Ethiopia, Kenya
- C. ambiguus (Lessert, 1925) — East, Southern Africa
  - C. a. concolor (Caporiacco, 1947) — East Africa
- C. atomarius (Lawrence, 1942) — Central, East, Southern Africa
- C. bifidus Blandin, 1978 — Rwanda
- C. camerunensis Thorell, 1899 (type) — West, Central Africa
- C. marfieldi (Roewer, 1955) — West, Central Africa
- C. minor (Lessert, 1928) — Ivory Coast, Congo
- C. natalensis (Lawrence, 1947) — South Africa
- C. rotundus Blandin, 1978 — Congo

=== Chiasmopes ===
Chiasmopes

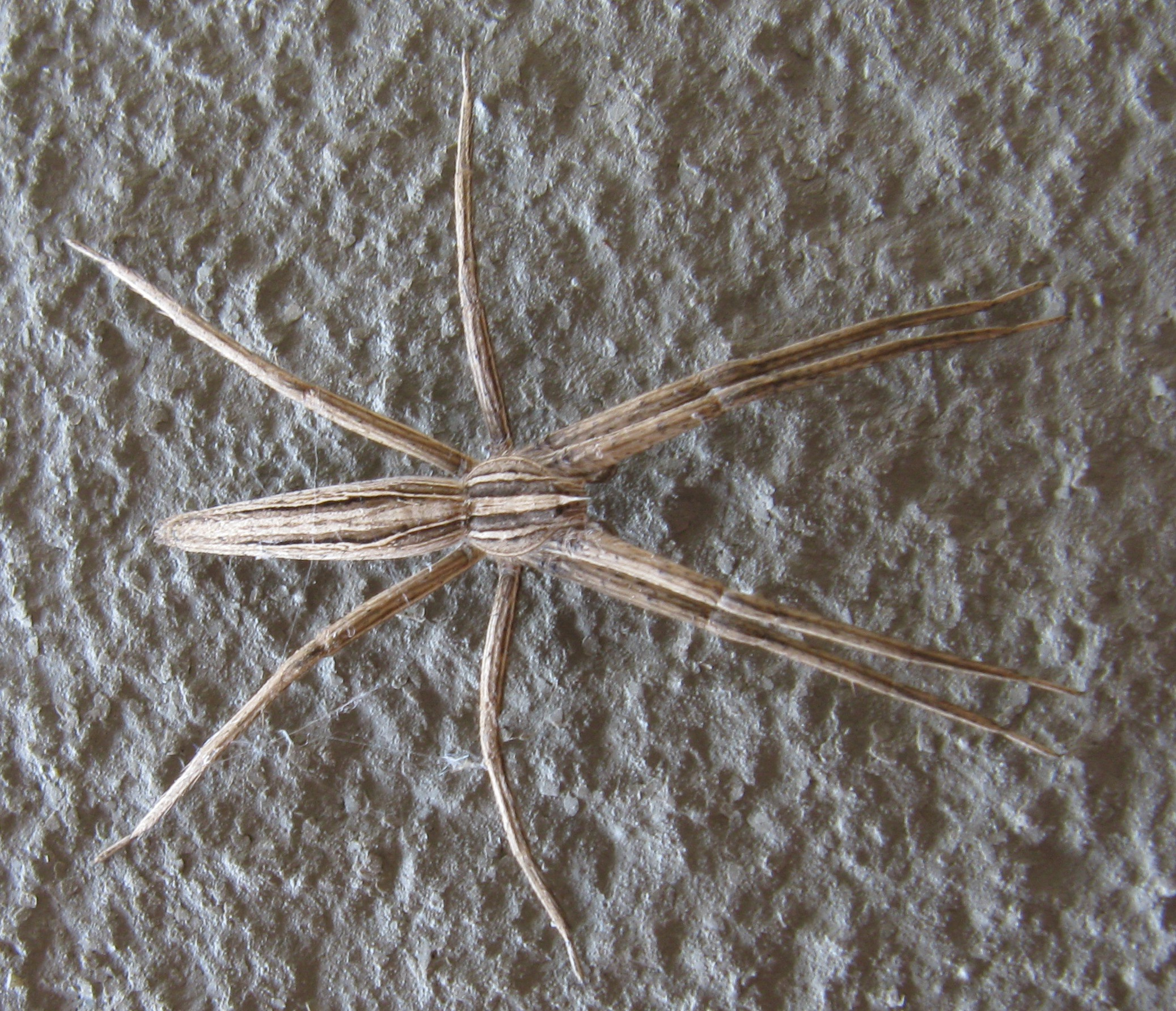
Chiasmopes lineatus

Chiasmopes Pavesi, 1883

- C. hystrix (Berland, 1922) — Ethiopia
- C. lineatus (Pocock, 1898) — Central, East, Southern Africa
- C. namaquensis (Roewer, 1955) — Namibia
- C. signatus (Pocock, 1902) — South Africa

=== Cispinilus ===
Cispinilus Roewer, 1955

- C. flavidus (Simon, 1909) (type) — Central Africa

=== Cispius ===
Cispius

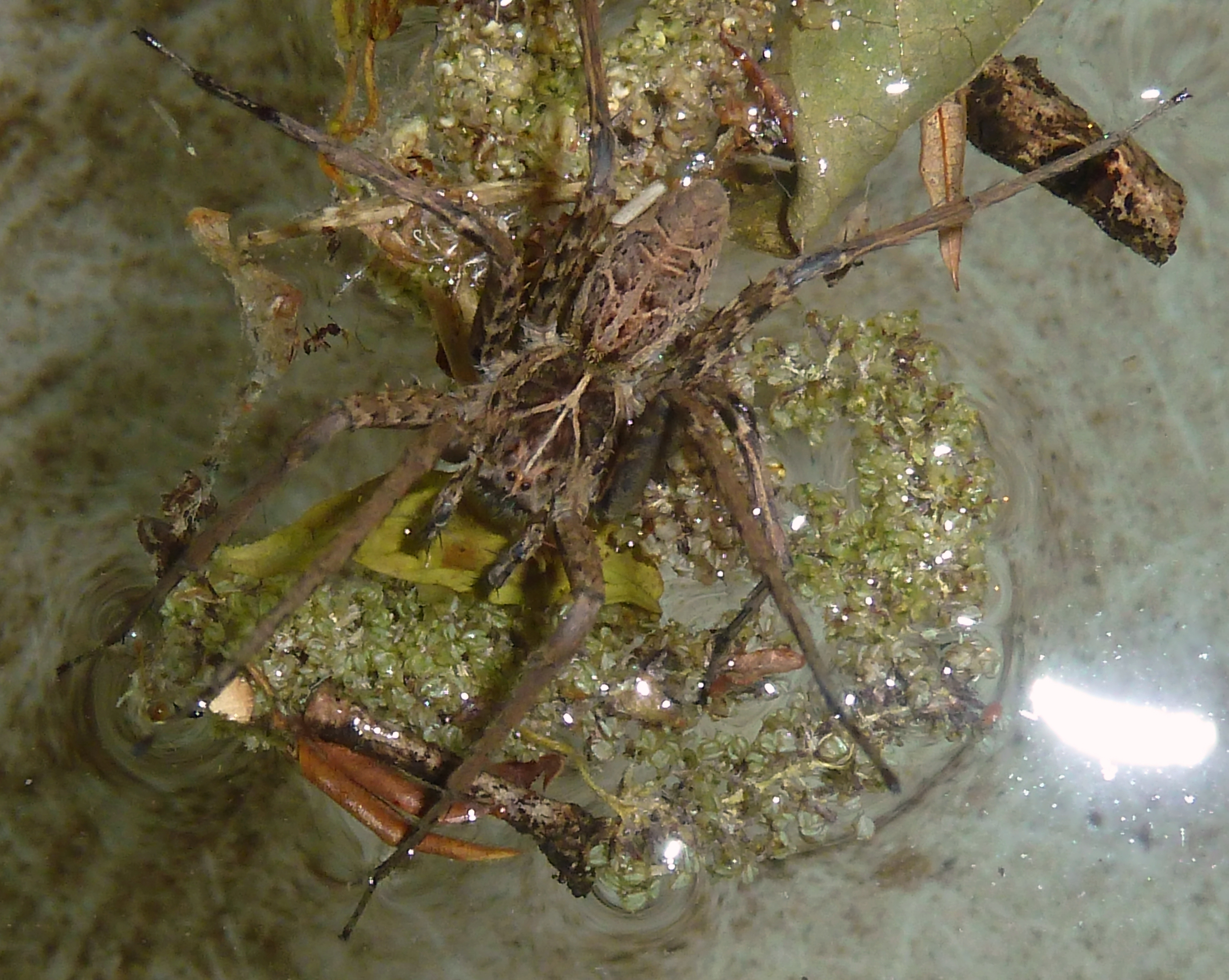
Cispius kimbius

Cispius Simon, 1898

- C. affinis Lessert, 1916 — East Africa
- C. bidentatus Lessert, 1936 — Central, East Africa
- C. kimbius Blandin, 1978 — South Africa
- C. maruanus (Roewer, 1955) — West, Central Africa
- C. problematicus Blandin, 1978 — Congo
- C. simoni Lessert, 1915 — East Africa
- C. strandi Caporiacco, 1947 — East Africa
- C. thorelli Blandin, 1978 — Congo
- C. variegatus Simon, 1898 (type) — Congo

=== Cladycnis ===
Cladycnis Simon, 1898

- C. insignis (Lucas, 1838) (type) — Canary Is.

=== Conakrya ===
Conakrya Schmidt, 1956

- C. wolffi Schmidt, 1956 (type) — Guinea

== D ==
=== Dendrolycosa ===
Dendrolycosa Doleschall, 1859

- D. bairdi Jäger, 2011 — Laos
- D. bobbiliensis (Reddy & Patel, 1993) — India
- D. cruciata (Roewer, 1955) — Tanzania
- D. duckitti Jäger, 2011 — Laos, Indonesia (Sumatra)
- D. fusca Doleschall, 1859 (type) — Indonesia (Ambon)
- D. gitae (Tikader, 1970) — India (mainland, Andaman Is.)
- D. icadia (L. Koch, 1876) — Australia (Queensland)
- D. kakadu Raven & Hebron, 2018 — Australia (Northern Territory)
- D. lepida (Thorell, 1890) — Indonesia (Sumatra)
- D. ornata (Berland, 1924) — New Caledonia
- D. parangbusta (Barrion & Litsinger, 1995) — Philippines
- D. putiana (Barrion & Litsinger, 1995) — Philippines
- D. robusta (Thorell, 1895) — China, Myanmar, Laos, Vietnam
- D. rossi Silva & Griswold, 2013 — Madagascar
- D. sierwaldae Jäger, 2011 — New Guinea
- D. songi (Zhang, 2000) — China
- D. yuka Jäger, 2011 — South Africa

== E ==
=== Eucamptopus ===
Eucamptopus Pocock, 1900

- E. coronatus Pocock, 1900 (type) — India

=== Euprosthenops ===
Euprosthenops Pocock, 1897

- E. australis Simon, 1898 — Senegal, Nigeria, Zambia, Botswana, South Africa
- E. bayaonianus (Brito Capello, 1867) (type) — West, Central, East Africa
- E. benoiti Blandin, 1976 — Rwanda
- E. biguttatus Roewer, 1955 — Congo, Namibia
- E. ellioti (O. Pickard-Cambridge, 1877) — India
- E. pavesii Lessert, 1928 — Central, East Africa
- E. proximus Lessert, 1916 — Central, East, Southern Africa
  - E. p. maximus Blandin, 1976 — Ivory Coast
- E. schenkeli (Roewer, 1955) — East Africa
- E. wuehlischi Roewer, 1955 — Namibia

=== Euprosthenopsis ===
Euprosthenopsis Blandin, 1974

- E. armata (Strand, 1913) (type) — Central, East Africa
- E. lamorali Blandin, 1977 — South Africa
- E. lesserti (Roewer, 1955) — East Africa
  - E. l. garambensis (Lessert, 1928) — Central Africa
- E. pulchella (Pocock, 1902) — South Africa, Lesotho, Eswatini
- E. rothschildi Blandin, 1977 — Kenya
- E. vachoni Blandin, 1977 — Djibouti
- E. vuattouxi Blandin, 1977 — Ivory Coast

== H ==
=== Hala ===
Hala Jocqué, 1994

- H. impigra Jocqué, 1994 (type) — Madagascar
- H. paulyi Jocqué, 1994 — Madagascar

=== Hygropoda ===
Hygropoda

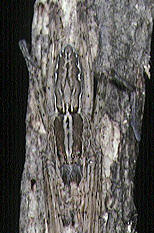
Hygropoda higenaga, female

Hygropoda Thorell, 1894

- H. africana Simon, 1898 — Gabon, Sierra Leone
- H. albolimbata (Thorell, 1878) — Indonesia (Ambon)
- H. argentata Zhang, Zhu & Song, 2004 — China, Thailand
- H. balingkinitanus (Barrion & Litsinger, 1995) — Philippines
- H. borbonica (Vinson, 1863) — Réunion
- H. bottrelli (Barrion & Litsinger, 1995) — Philippines
- H. campanulata Zhang, Zhu & Song, 2004 — China, Thailand
- H. celebesiana (Strand, 1913) — Indonesia (Sulawesi)
- H. chandrakantii (Reddy & Patel, 1993) — India
- H. dolomedes (Doleschall, 1859) — Indonesia (Ambon)
- H. gracilis (Thorell, 1891) — India (Nicobar Is.)
- H. higenaga (Kishida, 1936) — China, Taiwan, Japan
- H. linearis (Simon, 1903) — Madagascar
- H. lineata (Thorell, 1881) — Indonesia to Australia
- H. longimana (Stoliczka, 1869) — Bangladesh, Malaysia
- H. longitarsis (Thorell, 1877) — Vietnam, Indonesia (Sulawesi)
  - H. l. fasciata (Thorell, 1877) — Indonesia (Sulawesi)
- H. macropus Pocock, 1897 — Indonesia (Moluccas)
- H. menglun Zhang, Zhu & Song, 2004 — China
- H. procera Thorell, 1895 — Myanmar
- H. prognatha Thorell, 1894 (type) — Singapore
- H. sikkimus (Tikader, 1970) — India (mainland, Andaman Is.)
- H. subannulipes Strand, 1911 — Indonesia (Aru Is.)
- H. taeniata Wang, 1993 — China
- H. tangana (Roewer, 1955) — Tanzania, Kenya, South Africa, Madagascar
- H. yunnan Zhang, Zhu & Song, 2004 — China, Thailand, Laos

== I ==
=== Ilipula ===
Ilipula Simon, 1903

- I. anguicula Simon, 1903 (type) — Vietnam

=== Inola ===
Inola Davies, 1982

- I. amicabilis Davies, 1982 (type) — Australia (Queensland)
- I. cracentis Davies, 1982 — Australia (Queensland)
- I. daviesae Tio & Humphrey, 2010 — Australia (Queensland)
- I. subtilis Davies, 1982 — Australia (Queensland)

== M ==
=== Maypacius ===
Maypacius Simon, 1898

- M. bilineatus (Pavesi, 1895) (type) — Central, East Africa, Madagascar
- M. christophei Blandin, 1975 — Congo
- M. curiosus Blandin, 1975 — Congo
- M. gilloni Blandin, 1978 — Senegal
- M. kaestneri Roewer, 1955 — West, Central Africa
- M. petrunkevitchi Lessert, 1933 — Angola, Rwanda
- M. roeweri Blandin, 1975 — Congo
- M. stuhlmanni (Bösenberg & Lenz, 1895) — Tanzania (mainland, Zanzibar)
- M. vittiger Simon, 1898 — Madagascar

== N ==
=== Nilus ===
Nilus

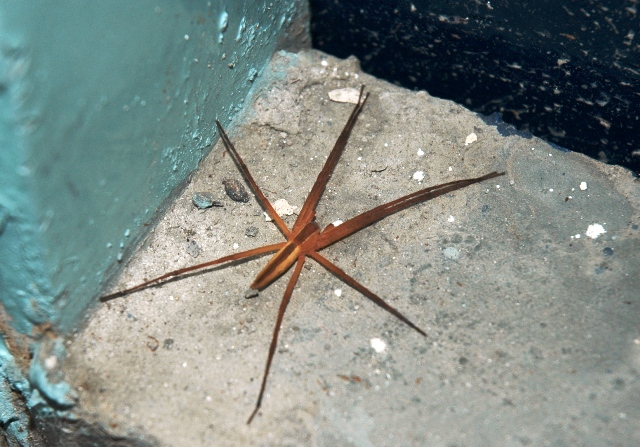
Fishing spider
(Nilus albocinctus)

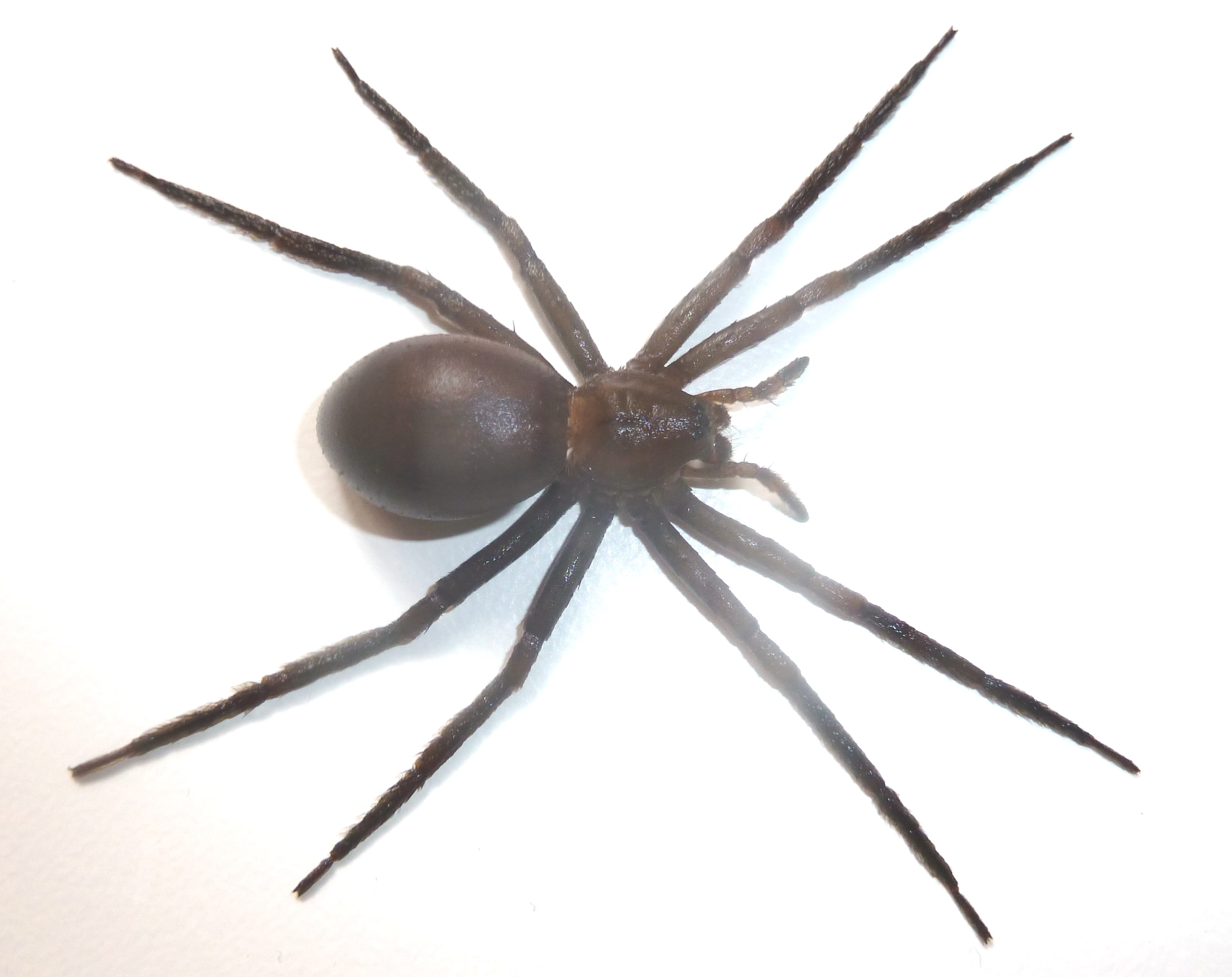
Nilus curtus

Nilus O. Pickard-Cambridge, 1876

- N. albocinctus (Doleschall, 1859) — India to Philippines
- N. curtus O. Pickard-Cambridge, 1876 (type) — Africa
- N. decorata (Patel & Reddy, 1990) — India
- N. esimoni (Sierwald, 1984) — Madagascar
- N. jayakari (F. O. Pickard-Cambridge, 1898) — Oman
- N. kolosvaryi (Caporiacco, 1947) — Central, East, Southern Africa
- N. leoninus (Strand, 1916) — Madagascar
- N. majungensis (Strand, 1907) — Mayotte, Madagascar
- N. margaritatus (Pocock, 1898) — Central, South Africa
- N. massajae (Pavesi, 1883) — Africa
- N. paralbocinctus (Zhang, Zhu & Song, 2004) — China, Laos
- N. phipsoni (F. O. Pickard-Cambridge, 1898) — India to China, Indonesia
- N. pictus (Simon, 1898) — West, Central Africa
- N. pseudoalbocinctus (Sen, Saha & Raychaudhuri, 2010) — India
- N. pseudojuvenilis (Sierwald, 1987) — Mozambique
- N. radiatolineatus (Strand, 1906) — Africa
- N. rossi (Pocock, 1902) — Central, South Africa
- N. rubromaculatus (Thorell, 1899) — West, Central Africa

== P ==
=== Papakula ===
Papakula Strand, 1911

- P. niveopunctata Strand, 1911 (type) — Indonesia (Aru Is.)

=== Paracladycnis ===
Paracladycnis Blandin, 1979

- P. vis Blandin, 1979 (type) — Madagascar

=== Perenethis ===
Perenethis

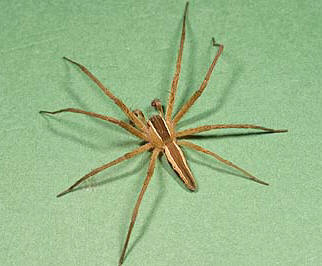
Perenethis venusta, male

Perenethis L. Koch, 1878

- P. dentifasciata (O. Pickard-Cambridge, 1885) — Pakistan or India
- P. fascigera (Bösenberg & Strand, 1906) — China, Korea, Japan
- P. simoni (Lessert, 1916) — Africa, Comoros
- P. sindica (Simon, 1897) — India, Sri Lanka, Nepal, China, Philippines
- P. symmetrica (Lawrence, 1927) — Africa
- P. venusta L. Koch, 1878 (type) — India, Myanmar, Thailand, Singapore, Philippines, Japan, Papua New Guinea, Australia (Queensland, Western Australia)

=== Phalaeops ===
Phalaeops Roewer, 1955

- P. mossambicus Roewer, 1955 (type) — Mozambique
- P. somalicus Roewer, 1955 — Djibouti

=== Pisaura ===
Pisaura

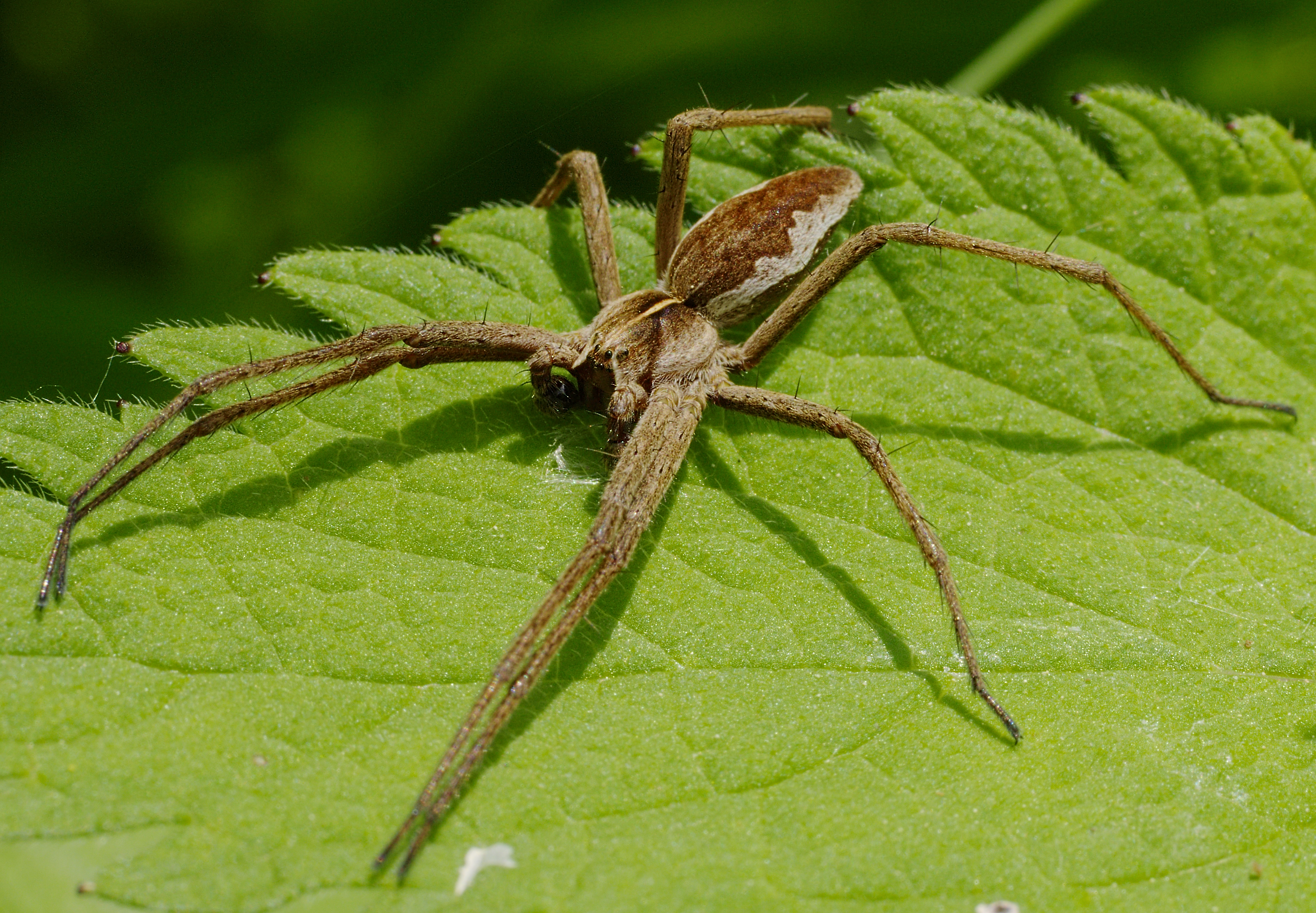
Pisaura mirabilis

Pisaura Simon, 1886

- P. acoreensis Wunderlich, 1992 — Azores
- P. anahitiformis Kishida, 1910 — Japan
- P. ancora Paik, 1969 — Russia, China, Korea
- P. bicornis Zhang & Song, 1992 — China, Japan
- P. consocia (O. Pickard-Cambridge, 1872) — Cyprus, Turkey, Israel, Lebanon, Syria
- P. lama Bösenberg & Strand, 1906 — Russia, China, Korea, Japan
- P. mirabilis (Clerck, 1757) (type) — Europe, Turkey, Middle East, Caucasus, Russia (Europe to Middle Siberia), Central Asia, China
- P. novicia (L. Koch, 1878) — Mediterranean to Central Asia
- P. orientalis Kulczyński, 1913 — Mediterranean
- P. podilensis Patel & Reddy, 1990 — India
- P. quadrilineata (Lucas, 1838) — Canary Is., Madeira
- P. sublama Zhang, 2000 — China
- P. swamii Patel, 1987 — India

=== Pisaurina ===
Pisaurina

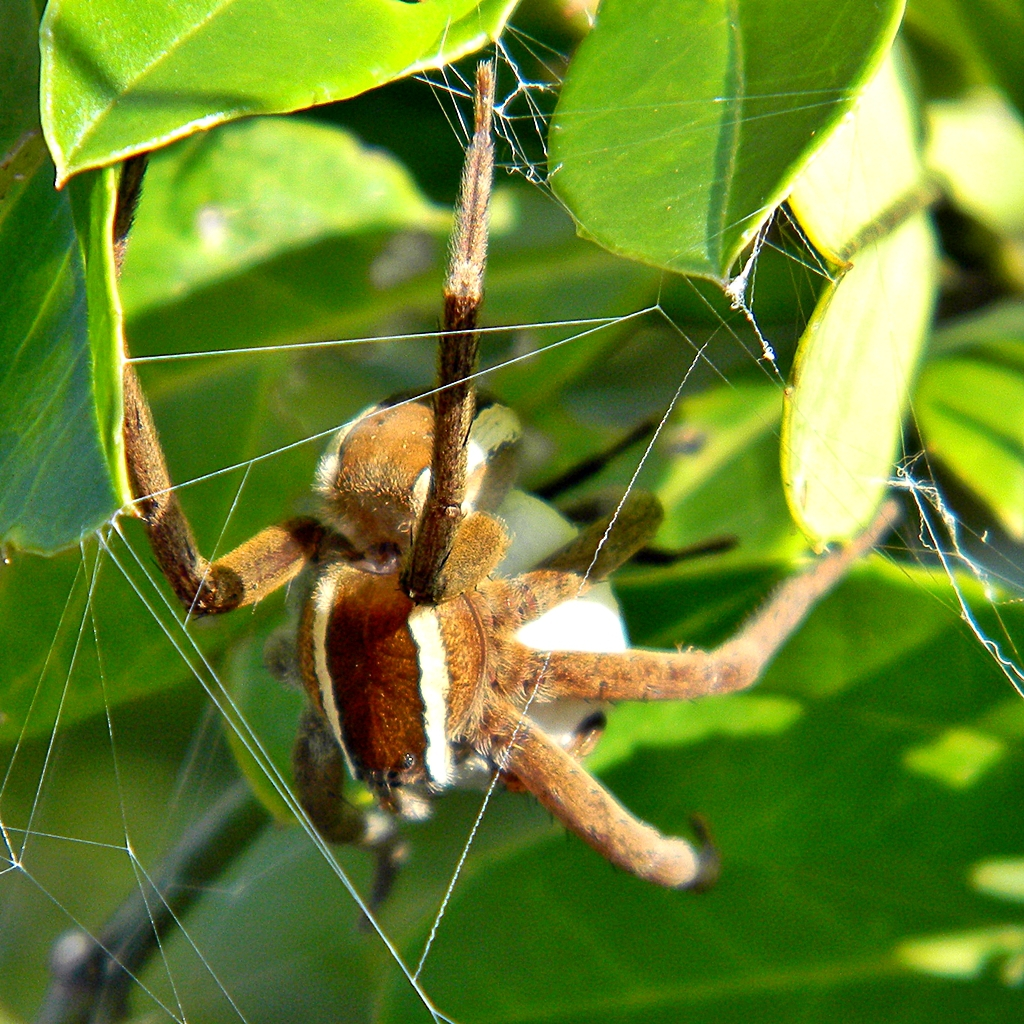
Pisaurina brevipes

Pisaurina Simon, 1898

- P. brevipes (Emerton, 1911) — USA, Canada
- P. dubia (Hentz, 1847) — USA
- P. mira (Walckenaer, 1837) (type) — USA, Canada
- P. undulata (Keyserling, 1887) — USA, Cuba

=== Polyboea ===
Polyboea Thorell, 1895

- P. vulpina Thorell, 1895 (type) — India, Myanmar, Thailand, Malaysia, Singapore
- P. zonaformis (Wang, 1993) — India, China, Laos

== Q ==
=== Qianlingula ===
Qianlingula Zhang, Zhu & Song, 2004

- Q. bilamellata Zhang, Zhu & Song, 2004 (type) — China
- Q. jiafu Zhang, Zhu & Song, 2004 — China
- Q. turbinata Zhang, Zhu & Song, 2004 — China

== R ==
=== Rothus ===
Rothus

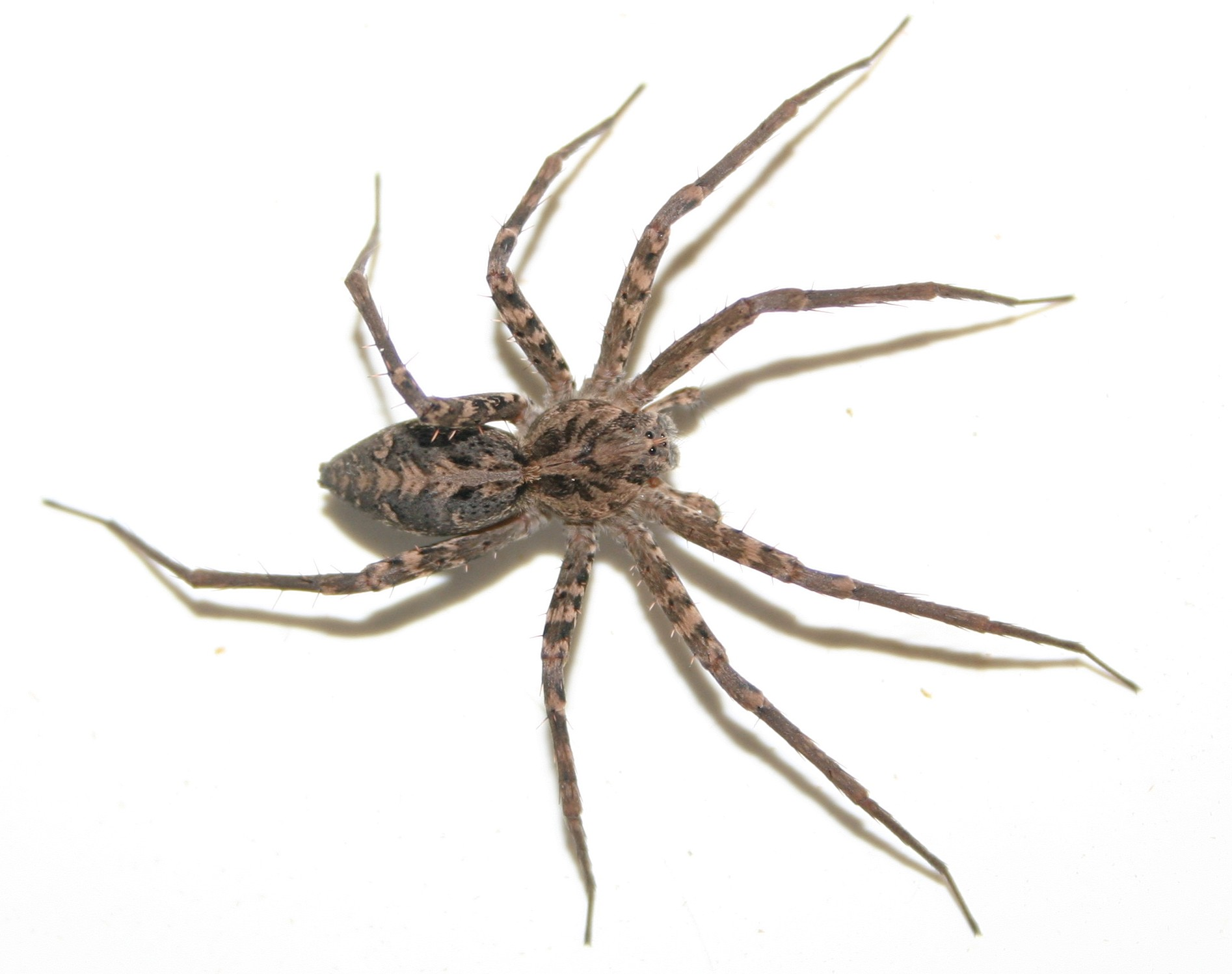
Rothus purpurissatus

Rothus Simon, 1898

- R. aethiopicus (Pavesi, 1883) — Africa, Israel
- R. auratus Pocock, 1900 — South Africa
- R. vittatus Simon, 1898 — South Africa

== S ==
=== Sphedanus ===
Sphedanus Thorell, 1877

- S. banna (Zhang, Zhu & Song, 2004) — China, Laos
- S. quadrimaculatus (Thorell, 1897) — Singapore, Malaysia, Indonesia (Borneo)
- S. undatus Thorell, 1877 (type) — Indonesia (Sulawesi)

=== Stoliczka ===
Stoliczka O. Pickard-Cambridge, 1885

- S. affinis Caporiacco, 1935 — Pakistan
- S. insignis O. Pickard-Cambridge, 1885 (type) — Pakistan

== T ==
=== Tallonia ===
Tallonia Simon, 1889

- T. picta Simon, 1889 (type) — Madagascar

=== Tapinothele ===
Tapinothele Simon, 1898

- T. astuta Simon, 1898 (type) — Tanzania (Zanzibar)

=== Tapinothelella ===
Tapinothelella Strand, 1909

- T. laboriosa Strand, 1909 (type) — South Africa

=== Tapinothelops ===
Tapinothelops Roewer, 1955

- T. concolor (Caporiacco, 1947) (type) — East Africa
- T. vittipes (Caporiacco, 1941) — Ethiopia

=== Tetragonophthalma ===
Tetragonophthalma Karsch, 1878

- T. vulpina (Simon, 1898) — West, Central Africa

=== Thalassiopsis ===
Thalassiopsis Roewer, 1955

- T. vachoni Roewer, 1955 (type) — Madagascar

=== Thaumasia ===
Thaumasia Perty, 1833

- T. abrahami Mello-Leitão, 1948 — Honduras to Brazil
- T. acreana Silva & Carico, 2012 — Brazil
- T. annulipes F. O. Pickard-Cambridge, 1903 — Suriname, Peru, Brazil
- T. argenteonotata (Simon, 1898) — Mexico to Brazil
- T. caracarai Silva & Carico, 2012 — Mexico to Brazil
- T. caxiuana Silva & Carico, 2012 — Brazil
- T. diasi Silva & Carico, 2012 — Ecuador, Brazil
- T. heterogyna Chamberlin & Ivie, 1936 — Panama to Brazil
- T. hirsutochela Silva & Carico, 2012 — Costa Rica to Brazil
- T. lisei Silva & Carico, 2012 — Brazil
- T. onca Silva & Carico, 2012 — Colombia to Brazil
- T. oriximina Silva & Carico, 2012 — Brazil
- T. peruana Silva & Carico, 2012 — Peru
- T. scoparia (Simon, 1888) — Venezuela
- T. senilis Perty, 1833 (type) — Costa Rica to Paraguay
- T. velox Simon, 1898 — Panama to Argentina
- T. xingu Silva & Carico, 2012 — Colombia to Brazil

=== Tinus ===
Tinus F. O. Pickard-Cambridge, 1901

- T. arindamai Biswas & Roy, 2005 — India
- T. connexus (Bryant, 1940) — Cuba, Hispaniola
- T. minutus F. O. Pickard-Cambridge, 1901 — Mexico to El Salvador
- T. nigrinus F. O. Pickard-Cambridge, 1901 (type) — Mexico to Costa Rica
- T. oaxaca Carico, 2008 — Mexico
- T. palictlus Carico, 1976 — Mexico
- T. peregrinus (Bishop, 1924) — USA, Mexico
- T. prusius Carico, 1976 — Mexico
- T. schlingeri Silva, 2012 — Mexico
- T. tibialis F. O. Pickard-Cambridge, 1901 — Mexico
- T. ursus Carico, 1976 — Costa Rica, Panama

=== Tolma ===
Tolma Jocqué, 1994

- T. toreuta Jocqué, 1994 (type) — Madagascar

== V ==
=== Voraptipus ===
Voraptipus Roewer, 1955

- V. agilis Roewer, 1955 (type) — Mozambique

=== Vuattouxia ===
Vuattouxia Blandin, 1979

- V. kouassikonani Blandin, 1979 (type) — Ivory Coast

== W ==
=== Walrencea ===
Walrencea Blandin, 1979

- W. globosa Blandin, 1979 (type) — South Africa
