= Maypacius bilineatus =

Scientific classification
- Kingdom: Animalia
- Phylum: Arthropoda
- Subphylum: Chelicerata
- Class: Arachnida
- Order: Araneae
- Infraorder: Araneomorphae
- Family: Pisauridae
- Genus: Maypacius
- Species: M. bilineatus

Binomial name
- Maypacius bilineatus (Pavesi, 1895)

Synonyms
- Tetragonophthalma bilineatus Pavesi, 1895

Species of spider

Maypacius bilineatus is an African spider species in the family Pisauridae.

== Distribution ==
Maypacius bilineatus has been recorded from Ethiopia, Democratic Republic of the Congo, Mozambique, South Africa, Eswatini, and Madagascar.

In South Africa, the species has been sampled from Eastern Cape, KwaZulu-Natal, Limpopo, and Mpumalanga.

== Habitat and ecology ==
The species makes sheet-webs in vegetation and is active at night.

It has been sampled from the Forest, Grassland, and Savanna biomes at altitudes ranging from 47 to 1310 m.

== Conservation ==
Maypacius bilineatus is listed as Least Concern due to its wide geographical range. The species is protected in Polokwane Nature Reserve, Nylsvley Nature Reserve, and Mkambathi Nature Reserve. There are no significant threats to the species.

== Taxonomy ==
The species was originally described by Pavesi in 1895 as Tetragonophthalma bilineatus from Ethiopia. It was transferred to Maypacius by Simon in 1906. The species was revised by Blandin in 1975 and is known from both sexes.
