= Dobarakuku =

Scientific classification
- Kingdom: Animalia
- Phylum: Arthropoda
- Subphylum: Chelicerata
- Class: Arachnida
- Order: Araneae
- Infraorder: Araneomorphae
- Family: Pisauridae
- Genus: Dobarakuku; Perlaza-Cruz, Espinosa, Albo, Labarque & Cabra-García, 2025
- Species: D. ursus

Binomial name
- Dobarakuku ursus (Carico, 1976)

Species of spider

Dobarakuku is a monotypic genus of spiders in the family Pisauridae containing the single species, Dobarakuku ursus.

The species was originally described as Tinus ursus. The male gives a nuptial gift during mating.

== Distribution ==
Dobarakuku ursus has been recorded from Costa Rica, Panama, and Colombia.

== Etymology ==
The genus name is from the Emberá language and means "river spider" (do: river, barakuku: spider).
