= Maypacius stuhlmanni =

Stuhlmann's Maypacius nursery-web spider

Scientific classification
- Kingdom: Animalia
- Phylum: Arthropoda
- Subphylum: Chelicerata
- Class: Arachnida
- Order: Araneae
- Infraorder: Araneomorphae
- Family: Pisauridae
- Genus: Maypacius
- Species: M. stuhlmanni

Binomial name
- Maypacius stuhlmanni (Bösenberg & Lenz, 1895)

Synonyms
- Tetragonophthalma stuhlmanni Bösenberg & Lenz, 1895

Species of spider

Maypacius stuhlmanni is a spider species in the family Pisauridae. The species is commonly known as Stuhlmann's Maypacius nursery-web spider.

== Distribution ==
Maypacius stuhlmanni has been recorded from Tanzania (including Zanzibar) and South Africa. In South Africa, the species has been sampled from Limpopo.

== Habitat and ecology ==
The species makes sheet webs in vegetation. It has been sampled from the Savanna biome at 1310 m.

== Conservation ==
Maypacius stuhlmanni is listed as Least Concern. Although the species is presently known only from females, it has a wide geographical range. The species is protected in Polokwane Nature Reserve. There are no significant threats to the species.

== Etymology ==
This species is named after German naturalist Franz Stuhlmann (1863-1928).

== Taxonomy ==
The species was originally described in 1895 from Tanzania and was revised by Blandin in 1975. It is known only from the female.
