= Eucamptopus =

Scientific classification
- Kingdom: Animalia
- Phylum: Arthropoda
- Subphylum: Chelicerata
- Class: Arachnida
- Order: Araneae
- Infraorder: Araneomorphae
- Family: Pisauridae
- Genus: Eucamptopus; Pocock, 1900
- Species: E. coronatus

Binomial name
- Eucamptopus coronatus Pocock, 1900

Genus of spiders

Eucamptopus is a monotypic genus of Indian nursery web spiders containing a single species, Eucamptopus coronatus. It was first described by Reginald Innes Pocock in 1900, and is only found in India.
