= Tapinothelella =

Scientific classification
- Kingdom: Animalia
- Phylum: Arthropoda
- Subphylum: Chelicerata
- Class: Arachnida
- Order: Araneae
- Infraorder: Araneomorphae
- Family: Pisauridae
- Genus: Tapinothelella; Strand, 1909
- Species: T. laboriosa

Binomial name
- Tapinothelella laboriosa Strand, 1909

Genus of spiders

Tapinothelella is a monotypic genus of South African nursery web spiders containing the single species, Tapinothelella laboriosa. It was first described by Embrik Strand in 1909, and is only found in South Africa.

== Taxonomy ==
This species is known only from two juvenile specimens, found in Simon's Town in 1903. The genus has not been revised, and the description was based on a juvenile with no drawings provided. The status of both the species and genus remains obscure. The type material was not found, making this possibly a nomen dubium.
