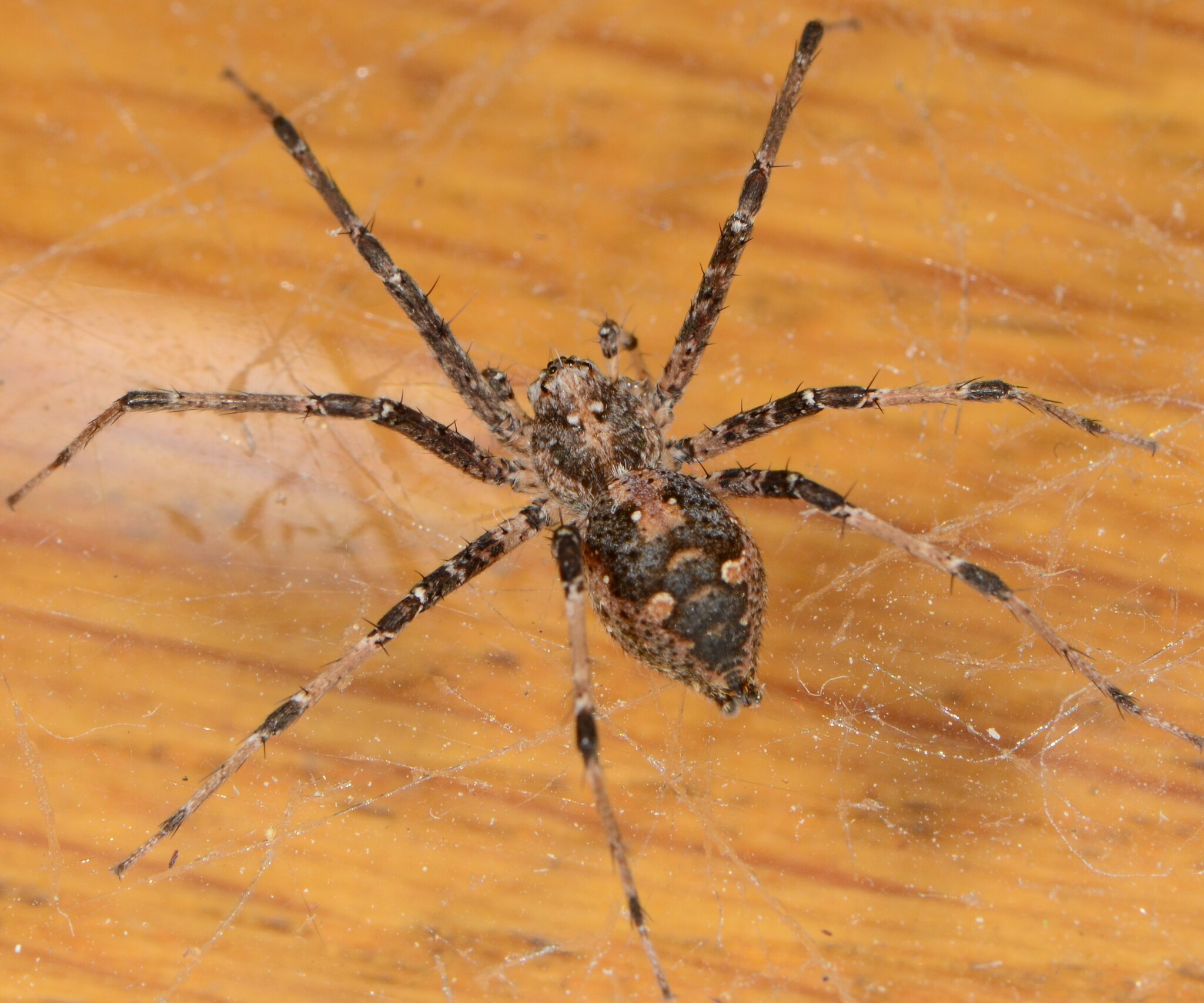
- female
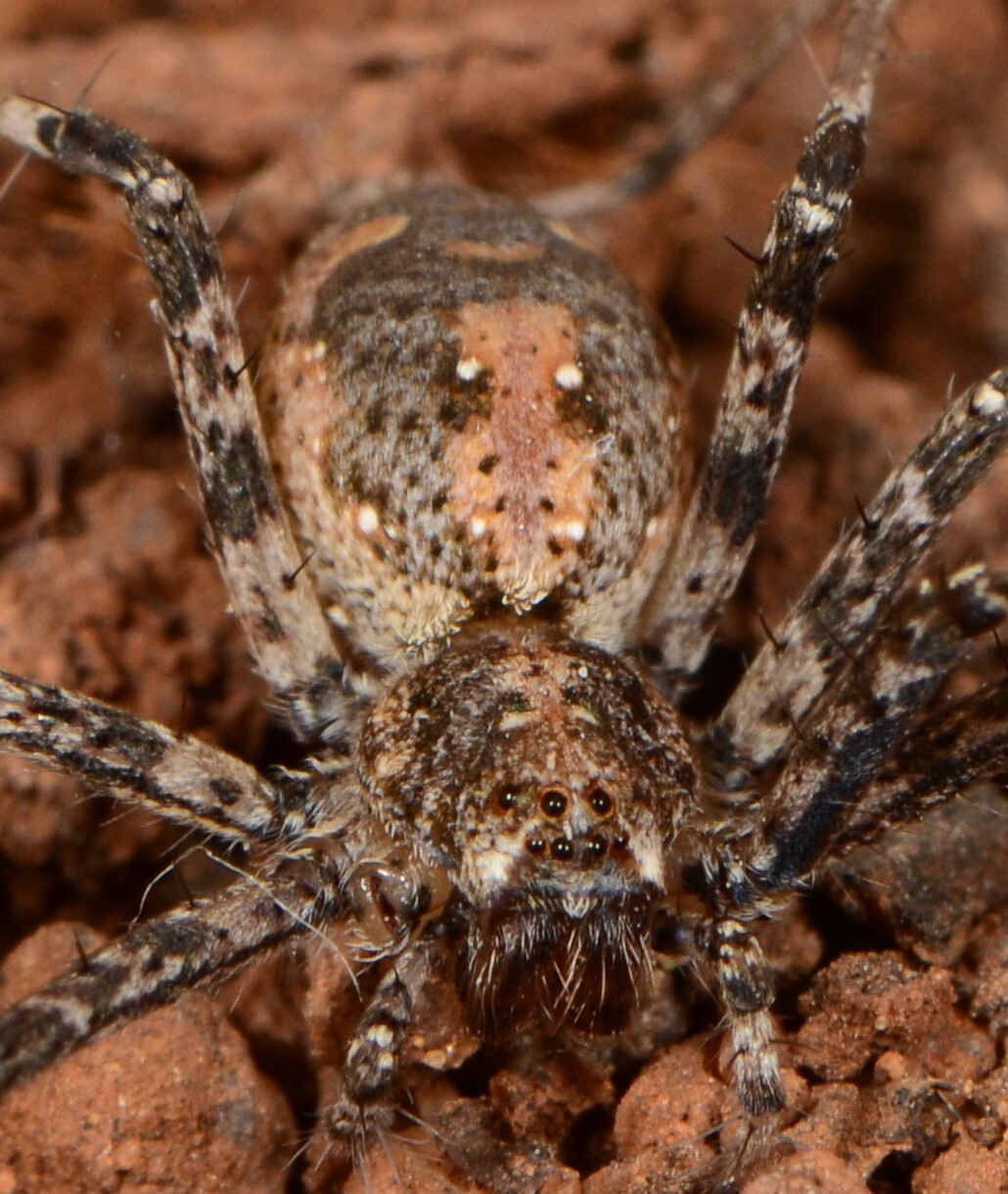
- female

Scientific classification
- Kingdom: Animalia
- Phylum: Arthropoda
- Subphylum: Chelicerata
- Class: Arachnida
- Order: Araneae
- Infraorder: Araneomorphae
- Family: Pisauridae
- Genus: Cispius
- Species: C. kimbius

Binomial name
- Cispius kimbius Blandin, 1978

= Cispius kimbius =

Kimberley Cispius nursery-web spider

Species of spider

Cispius kimbius is a species of spider in the family Pisauridae. It is found in Eswatini and South Africa, and is commonly known as the Kimberley Cispius nursery-web spider.

== Distribution ==
Cispius kimbius has been sampled from Eswatini and South Africa.

South African localities include Hogsback in the Eastern Cape, Erfenis Dam Nature Reserve, Bloemfontein and Kalkfontein Dam Nature Reserve in the Free State, multiple sites in KwaZulu-Natal including Dukuduku Forest Station and Ndumo Game Reserve, two sites in Limpopo, and Kimberley in the Northern Cape.

== Habitat and ecology ==
The species constructs a funnel-like web in short shrubs and bushes close to the ground or in trees. The capture web is sheet-like and composed of dense criss-crossing threads. At one end the web is drawn into a long funnel that descends into the base of a plant. They are active at night.

The species has been sampled from the Grassland, Nama Karoo and Savanna biomes at altitudes ranging from 7 to 1332 m.

== Description ==
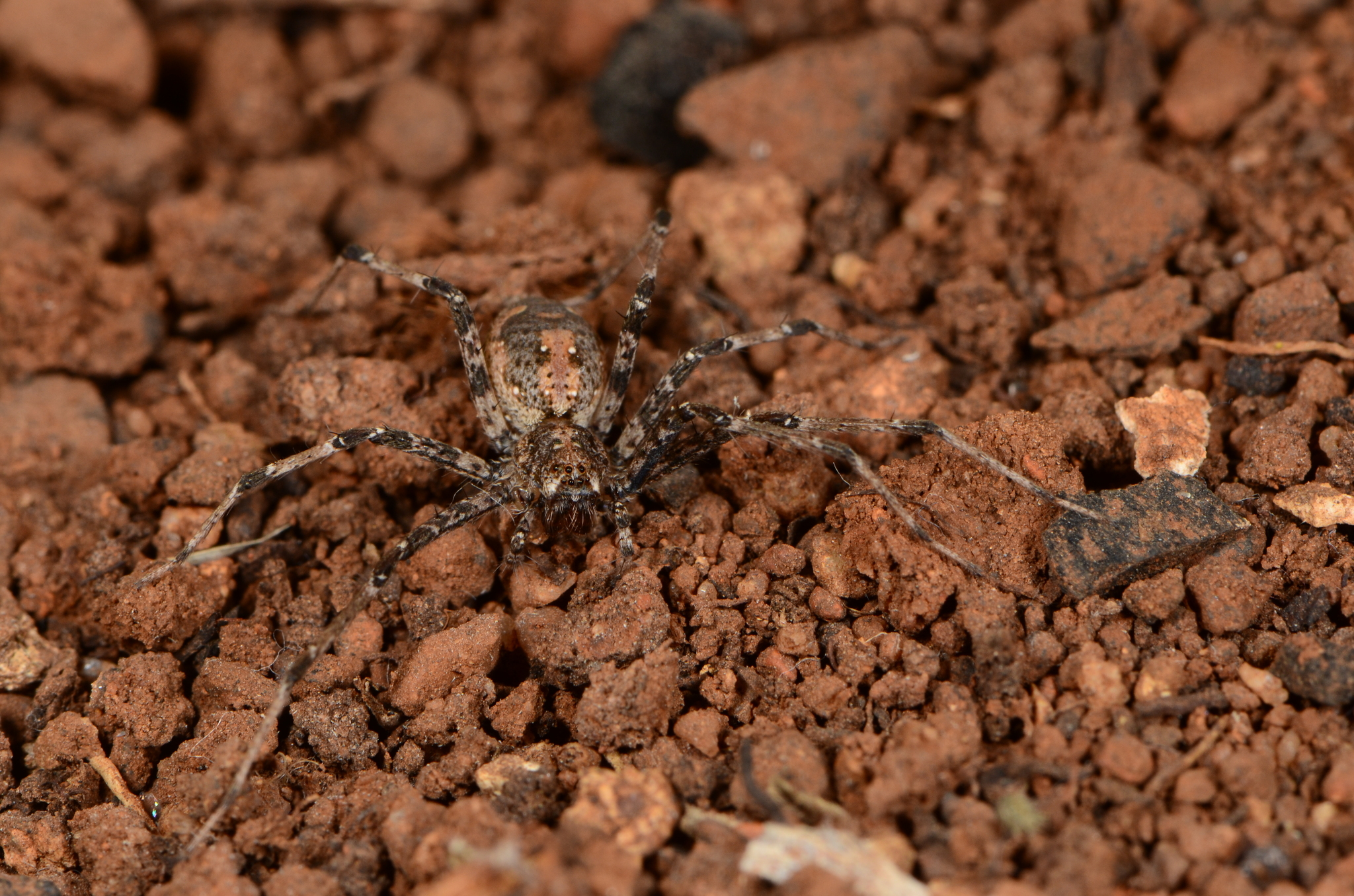
female

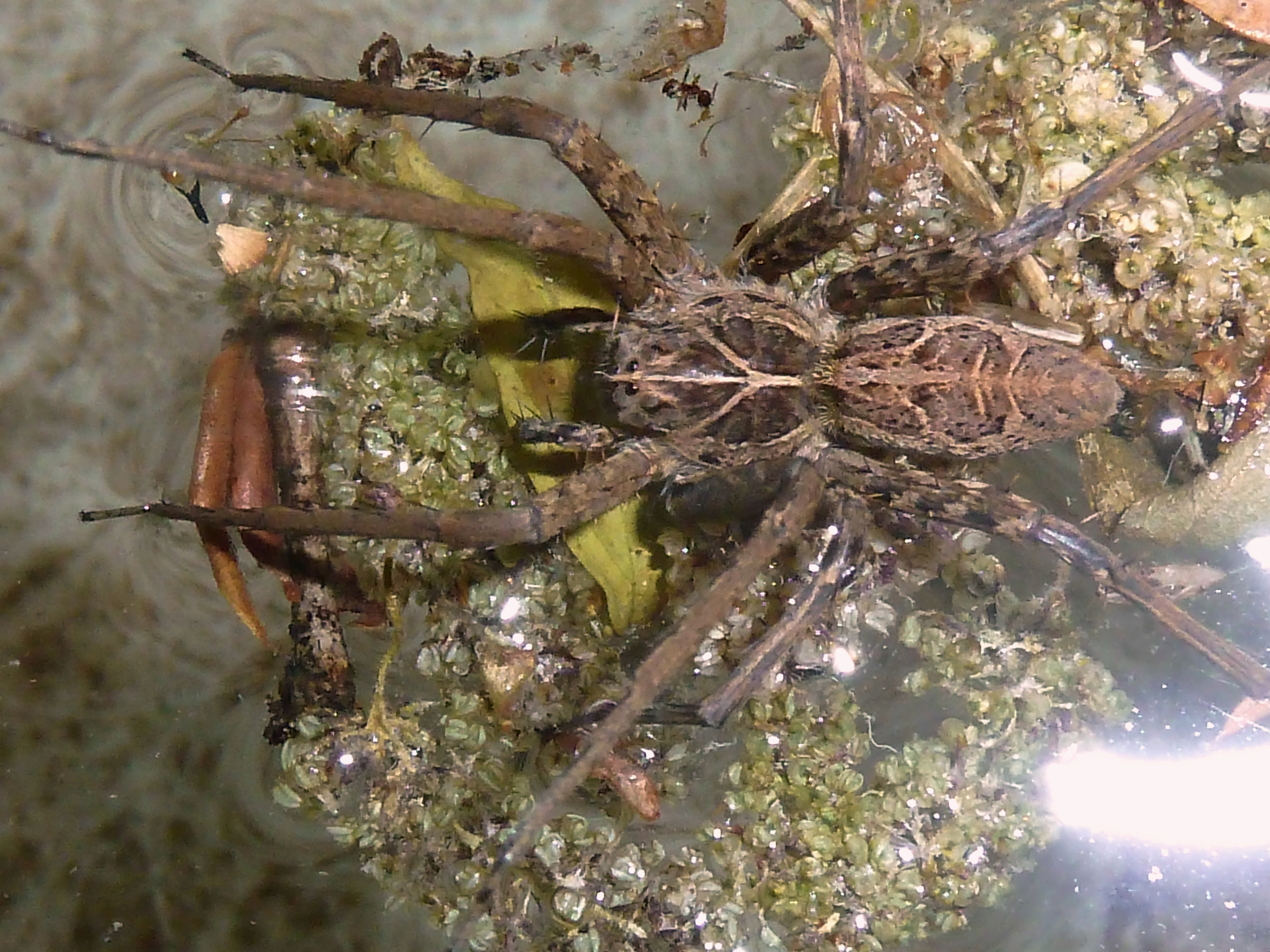

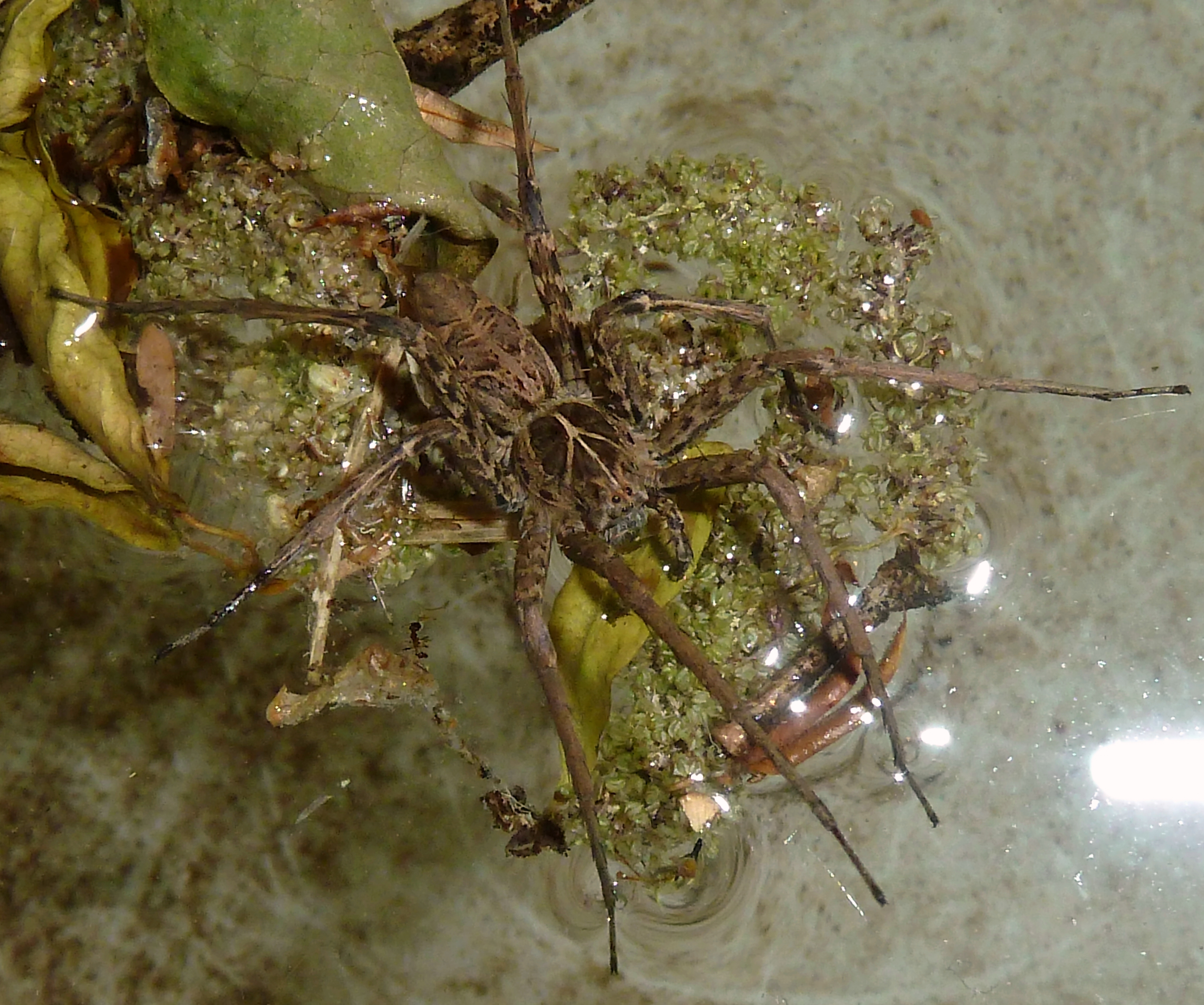

== Conservation ==
Cispius kimbius is listed as Least Concern due to its wide geographical range. The species is protected in Erfenis Dam Nature Reserve, Dukuduku Forest Station and Ndumo Game Reserve. There are no significant threats to the species.

== Taxonomy ==
The species was described by Blandin in 1978 from Kimberley in the Northern Cape. It is known only from the female.
