= Maypacius roeweri =

Roewer's Maypacius nursery-web spider

Scientific classification
- Kingdom: Animalia
- Phylum: Arthropoda
- Subphylum: Chelicerata
- Class: Arachnida
- Order: Araneae
- Infraorder: Araneomorphae
- Family: Pisauridae
- Genus: Maypacius
- Species: M. roeweri

Binomial name
- Maypacius roeweri Blandin, 1975

Species of spider

Maypacius roeweri is a spider species in the family Pisauridae. The species is commonly known as Roewer's Maypacius nursery-web spider.

== Distribution ==
Maypacius roeweri has been recorded from the Democratic Republic of the Congo and South Africa.

In South Africa, the species has been sampled from three provinces: Gauteng, Limpopo, and Mpumalanga.

== Habitat and ecology ==
The species makes sheet-webs in vegetation and is active at night.

It has been sampled from the Savanna biome at altitudes ranging from 295 to 1,146 m.

== Conservation ==
Maypacius roeweri is listed as Least Concern due to its wide geographical range in Africa. The species is protected in Blouberg Nature Reserve, Tswaing Nature Reserve, and Kruger National Park. There are no significant threats to the species.

== Taxonomy ==
The species was described by Blandin in 1975 from the Democratic Republic of the Congo and is known only from the male.
