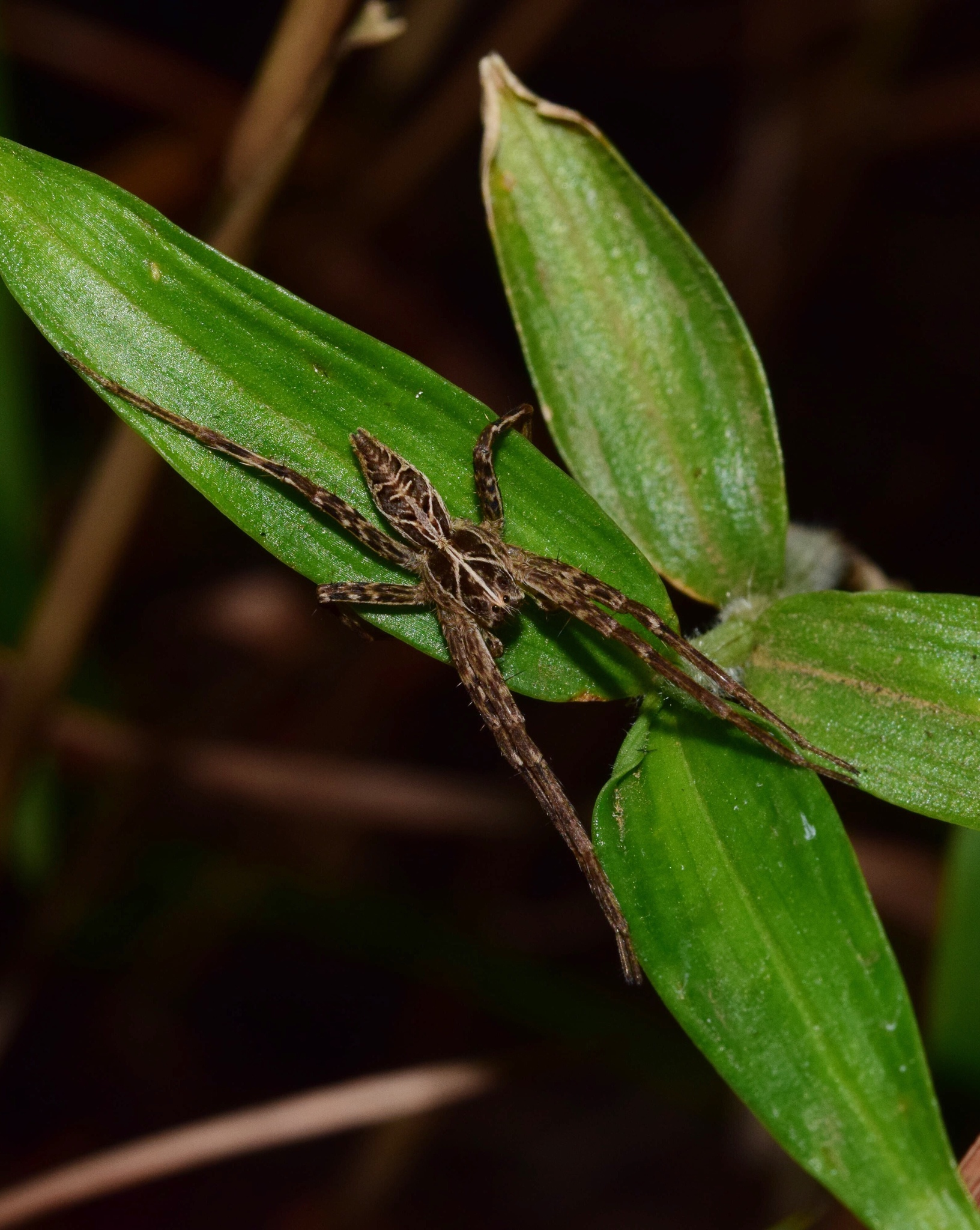

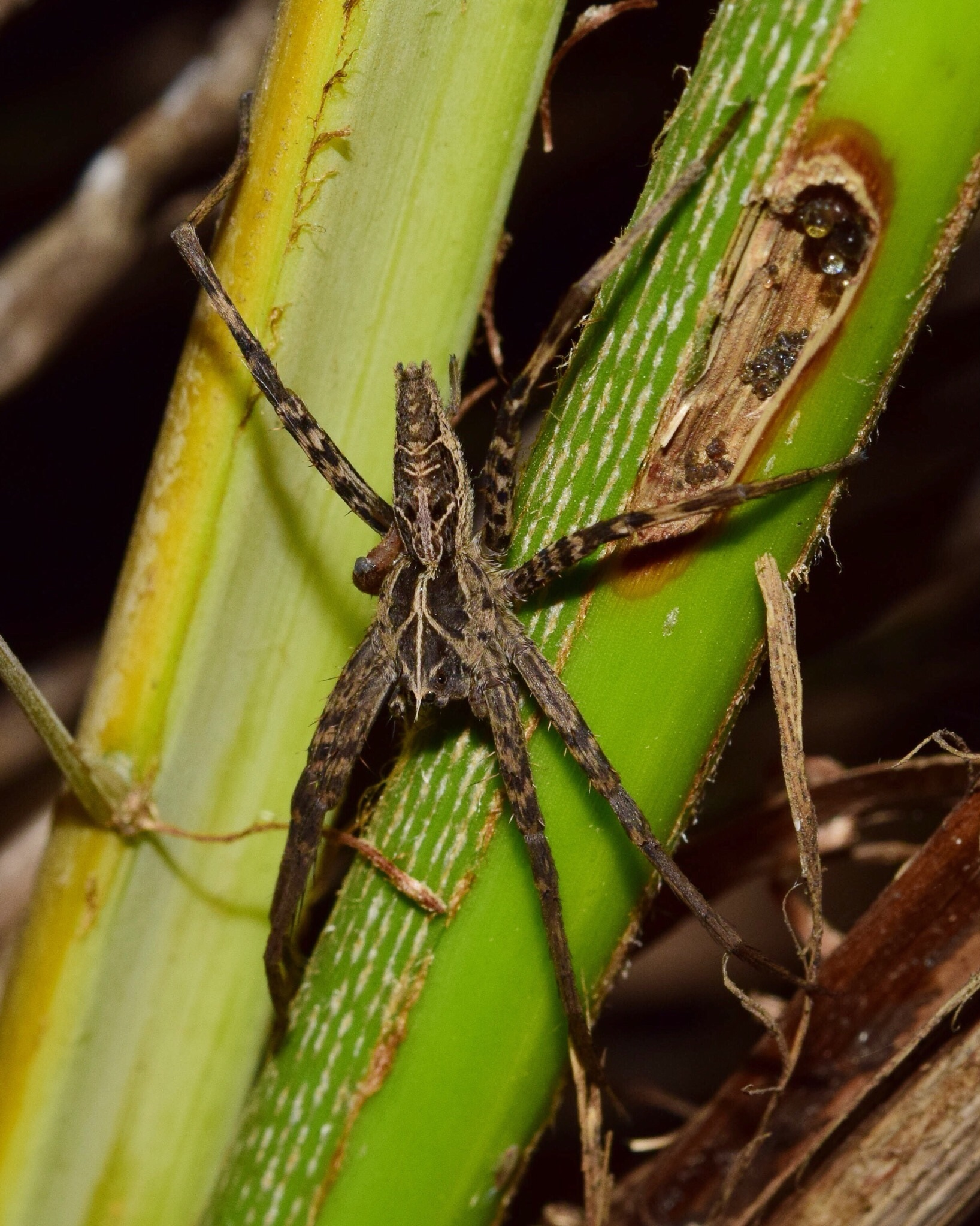

Scientific classification
- Kingdom: Animalia
- Phylum: Arthropoda
- Subphylum: Chelicerata
- Class: Arachnida
- Order: Araneae
- Infraorder: Araneomorphae
- Family: Pisauridae
- Genus: Rothus
- Species: R. vittatus

Binomial name
- Rothus vittatus Simon, 1898

= Rothus vittatus =

Cape Rothus nursery-web spider

Species of spider

Rothus vittatus is a spider species in the family Pisauridae. The species is commonly known as the Cape Rothus nursery-web spider.

== Distribution ==
Rothus vittatus is endemic to South Africa, where it has been sampled from three provinces: Eastern Cape, Northern Cape, and Western Cape.

== Habitat and ecology ==
These are free-running plant dwellers very commonly found on plants at night.

The species has been sampled from the Fynbos, Grassland, Nama Karoo, and Thicket biomes at altitudes ranging from 4 to 951 m. It has also been sampled from pistachio orchards.

== Conservation ==
Rothus vittatus is listed as Least Concern. Although the species is presently known only from females, it has a wide geographical range. The species is protected in Swartberg Nature Reserve and Table Mountain National Park. There are no significant threats to the species.

== Taxonomy ==
The species was described by Simon in 1898, with the type locality given only as Cape of Good Hope. It was revised by Silva and Sierwald in 2015 and is known only from the female.
