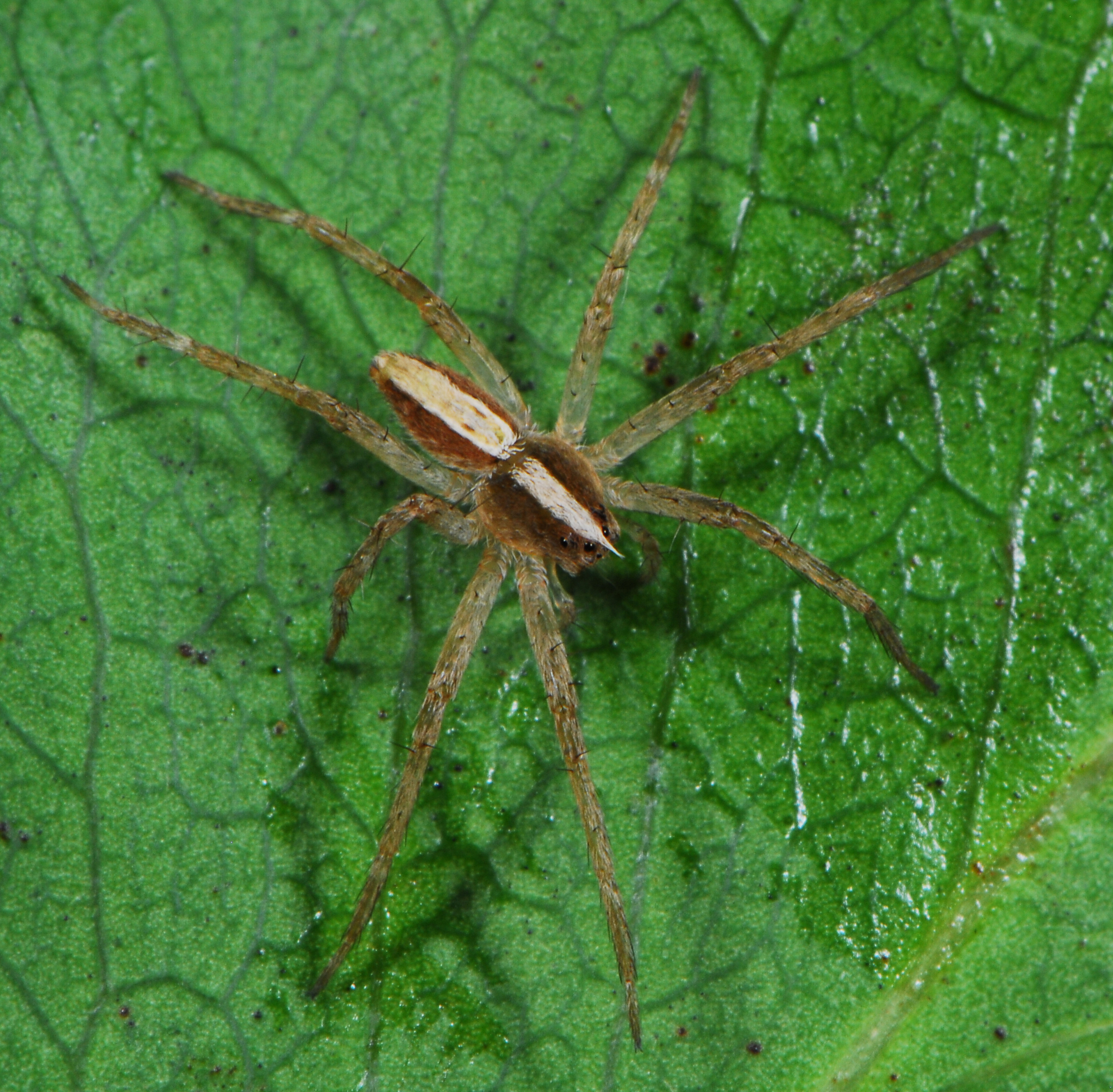
- Female
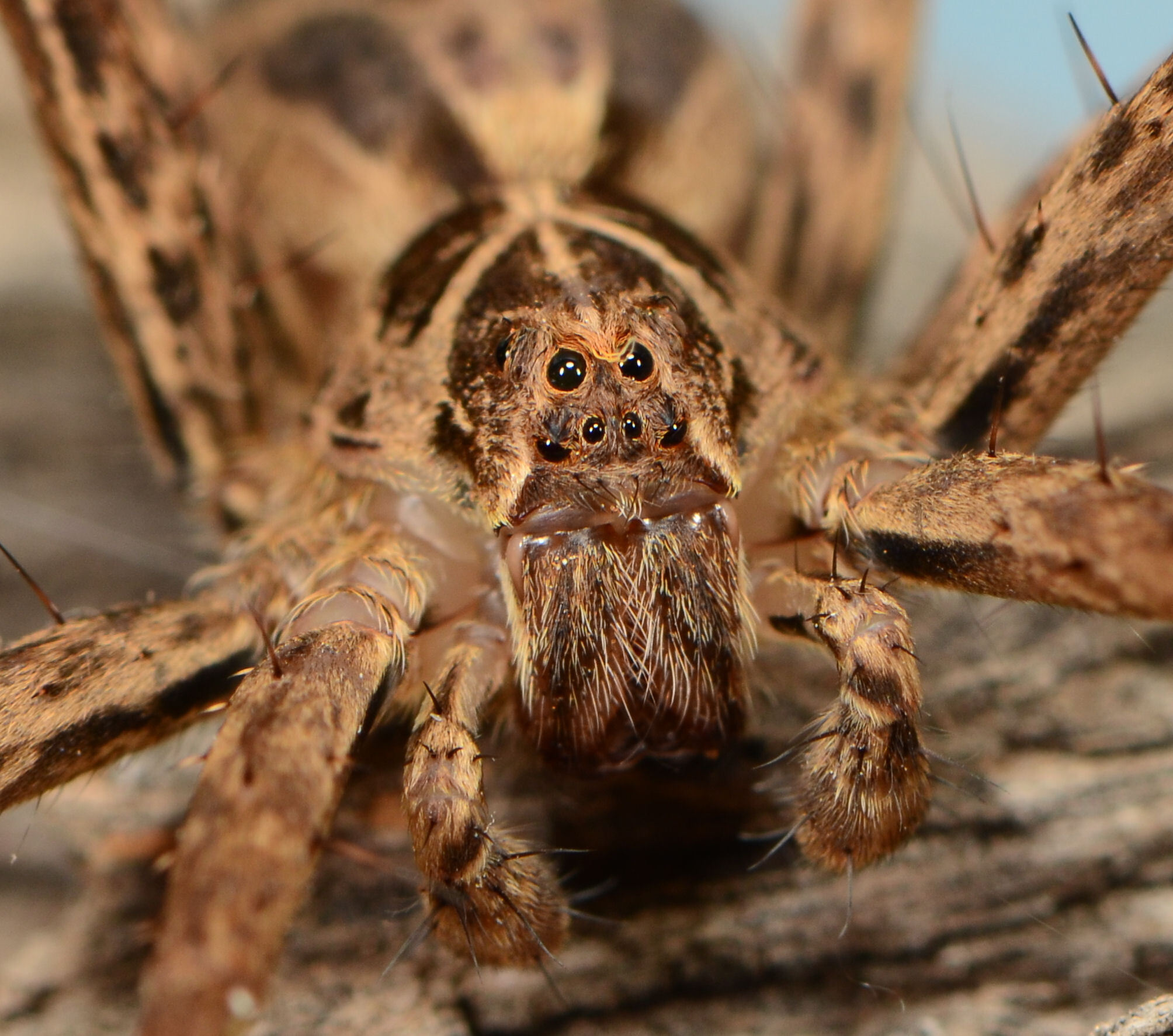
- Female

Scientific classification
- Kingdom: Animalia
- Phylum: Arthropoda
- Subphylum: Chelicerata
- Class: Arachnida
- Order: Araneae
- Infraorder: Araneomorphae
- Family: Pisauridae
- Genus: Rothus
- Species: R. aethiopicus

Binomial name
- Rothus aethiopicus (Pavesi, 1883)

Synonyms
- Ocyale aethiopicus Pavesi, 1883; Rothus purpurissatus Simon, 1898; Rothus catenulatus Simon, 1898; Rothus lineatus Pocock, 1902; Pisaura insula Strand, 1913; Rothus magnus Caporiacco, 1940; Rothus upembanus Roewer, 1955; Rothus pictus Roewer, 1955; Rothus mossamedesus Roewer, 1955; Rothus vestitus Roewer, 1955

= Rothus aethiopicus =

Common Rothus nursery-web spider

Species of spider

Rothus aethiopicus is a spider species in the family Pisauridae. The species is commonly known as the common Rothus nursery-web spider.

== Distribution ==
Rothus aethiopicus has been recorded from Cameroon, Ethiopia, Democratic Republic of the Congo, Rwanda, Kenya, Angola, Mozambique, South Africa, Eswatini, Egypt, and Israel.

In South Africa, the species has been sampled from all provinces at altitudes ranging from 4 to 1795 m.

== Habitat and ecology ==
These are free-running plant dwellers very commonly found on plants at night.

The species has been sampled from the Fynbos, Grassland, Nama Karoo, Savanna, and Succulent biomes. It has also been sampled from lucerne fields, pecan orchards, and vineyards.

== Description ==
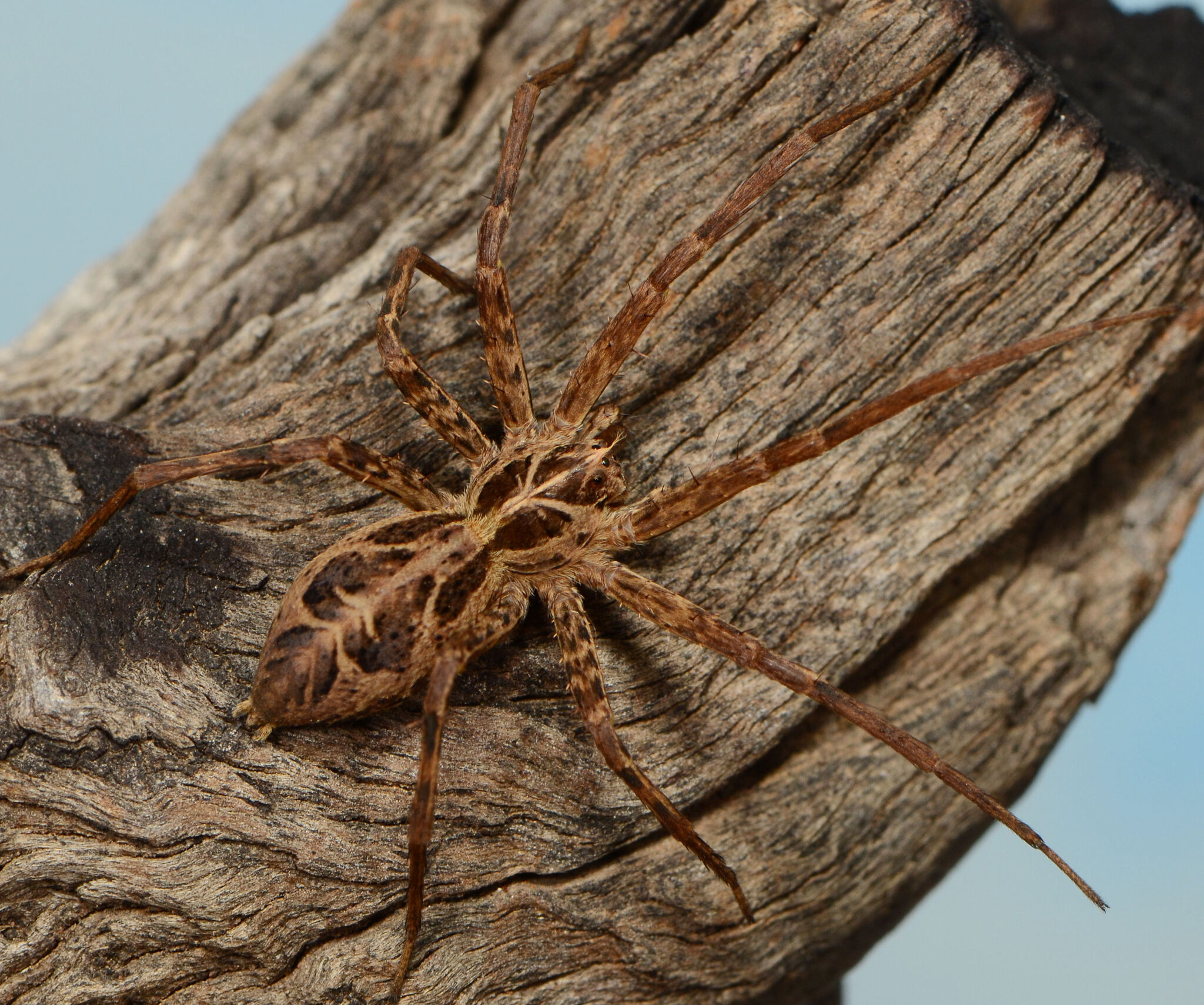
female

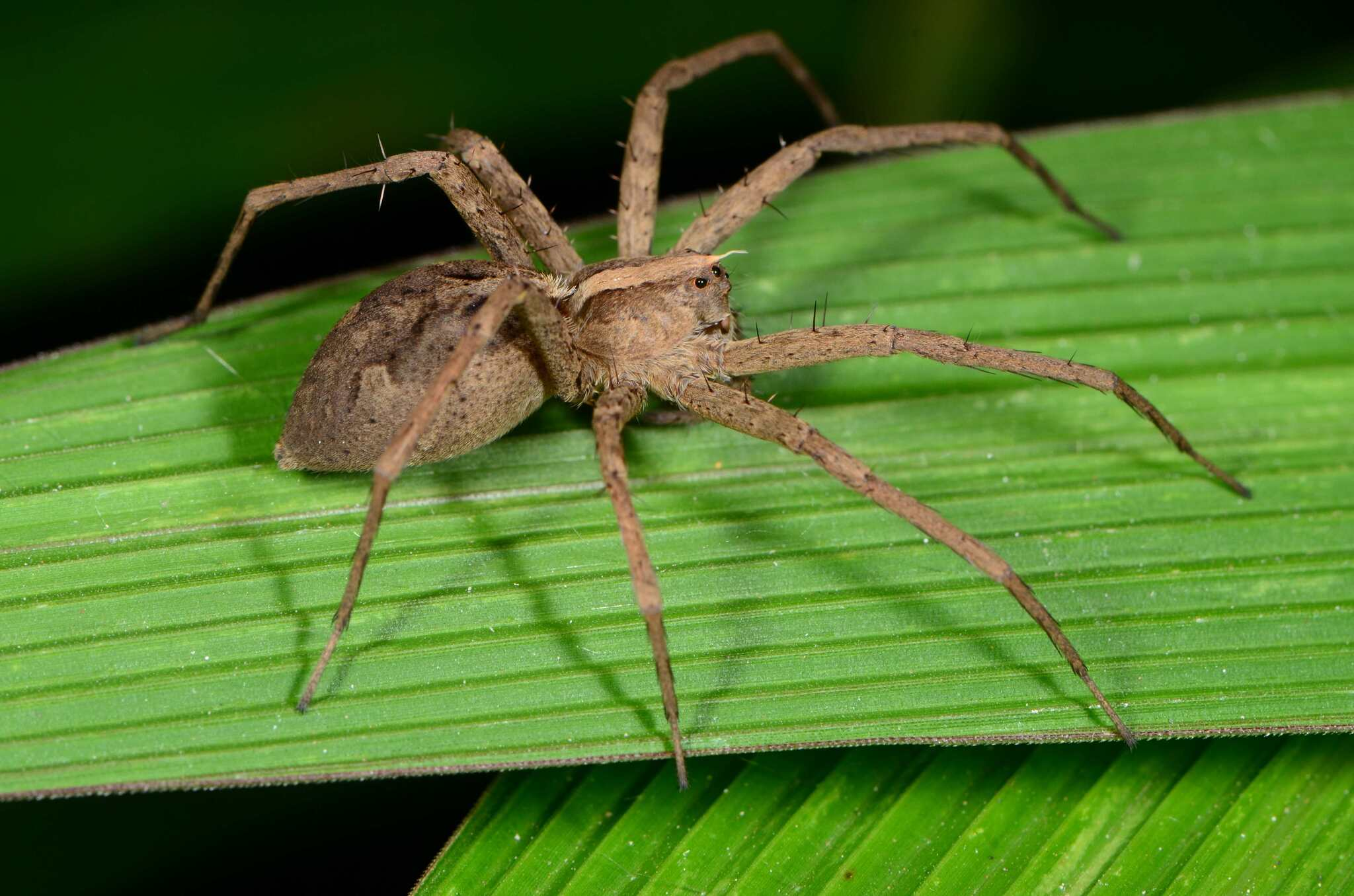
female

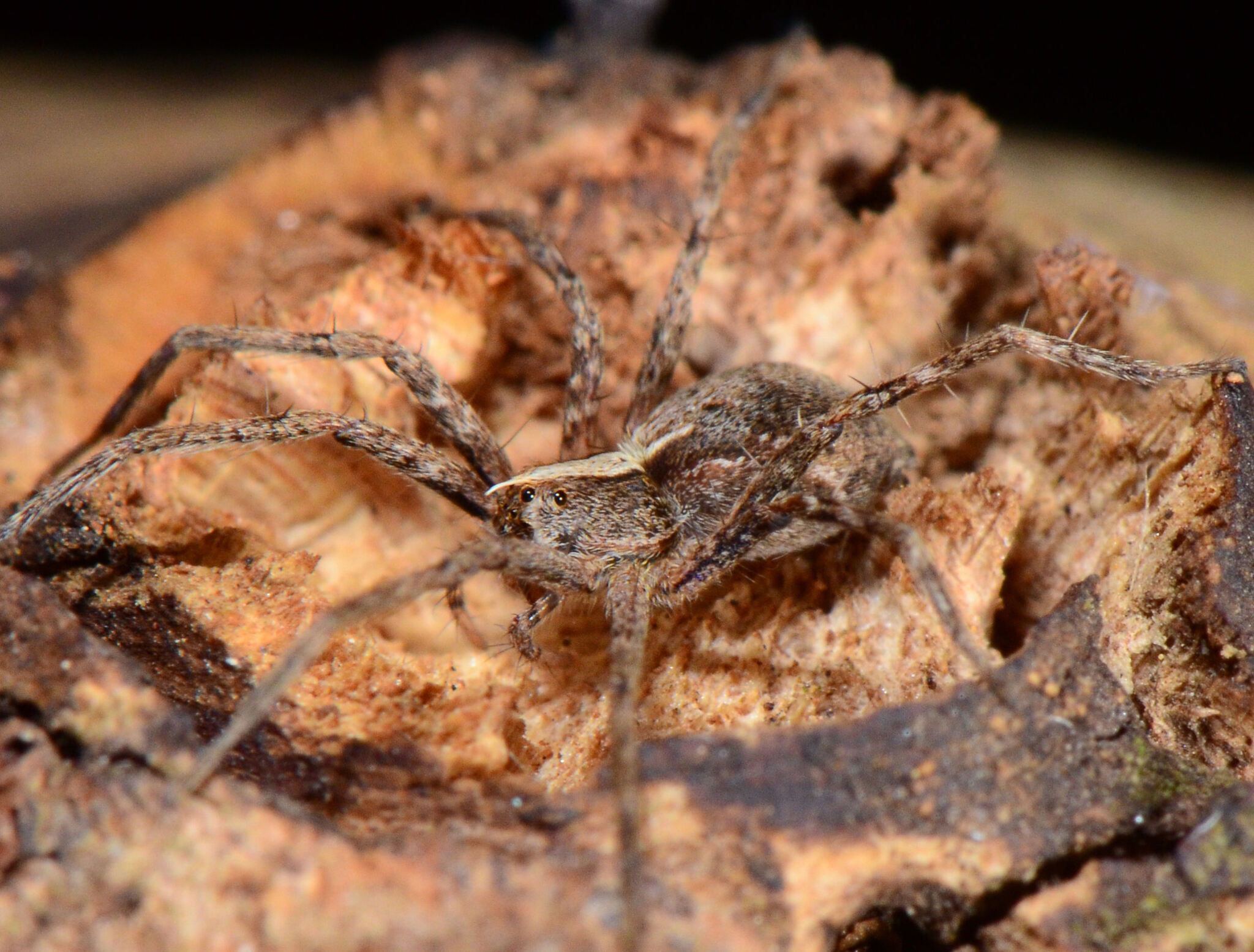
female

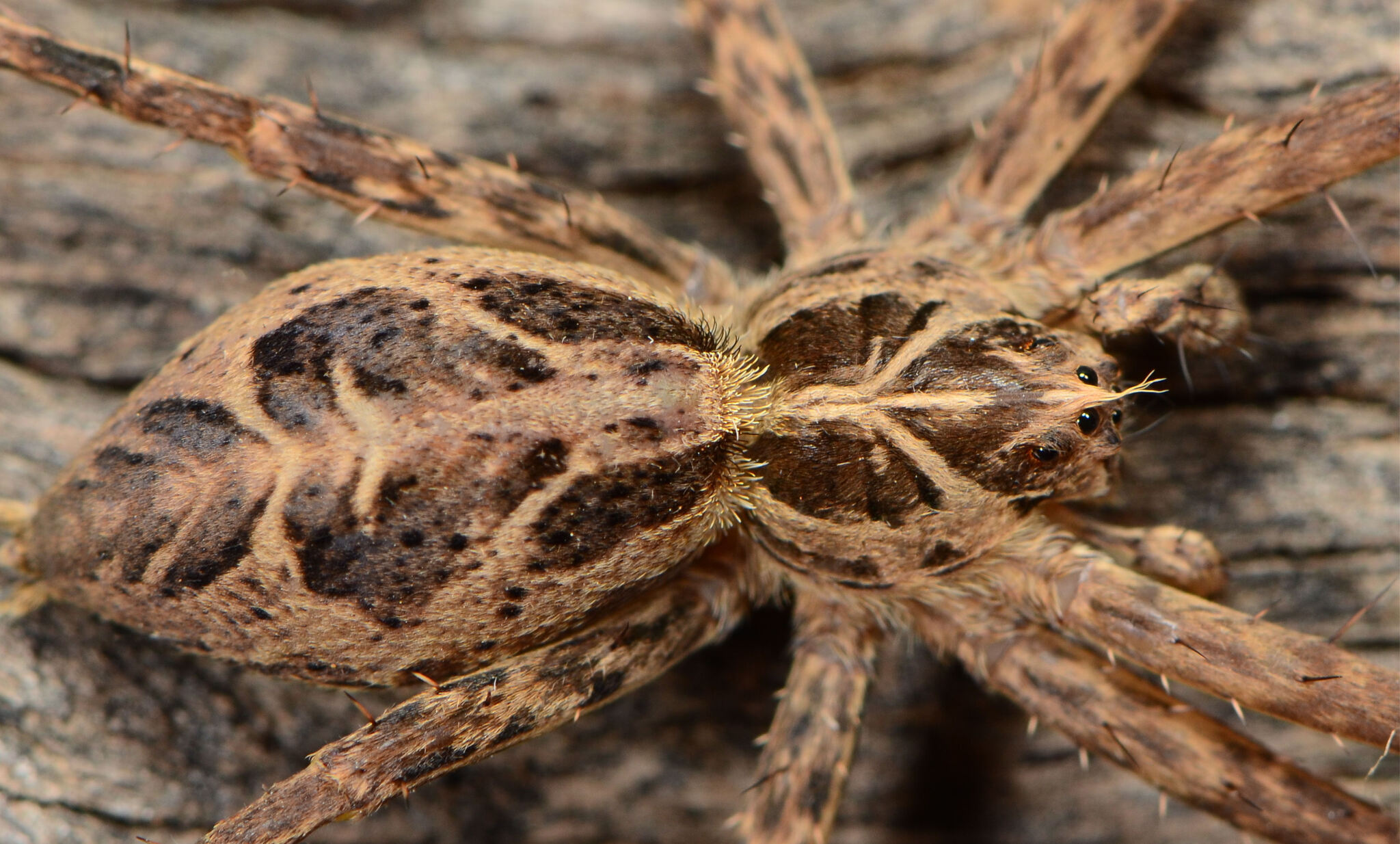
female

== Conservation ==
Rothus aethiopicus is listed as Least Concern due to its wide geographical range. The species is protected in more than 15 protected areas. There are no significant threats to the species.

== Taxonomy ==
The species was originally described by Pavesi in 1883 as Ocyale aethiopicus from Ethiopia. It was revised by Blandin in 1977 and by Silva and Sierwald in 2015, and is known from both sexes. It was previously known as Rothus purpurissatus.
