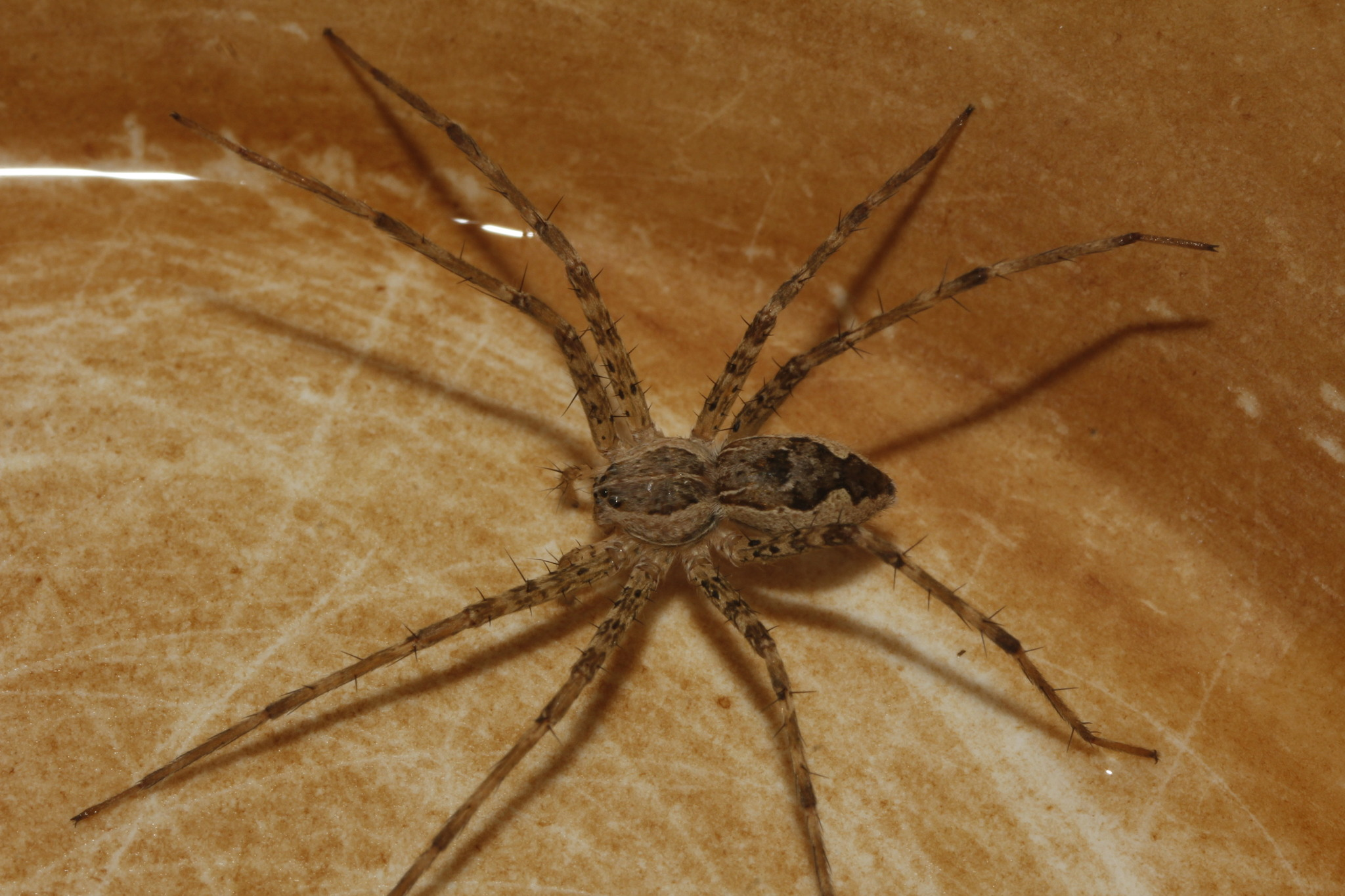

Scientific classification
- Domain: Eukaryota
- Kingdom: Animalia
- Phylum: Arthropoda
- Subphylum: Chelicerata
- Class: Arachnida
- Order: Araneae
- Infraorder: Araneomorphae
- Family: Pisauridae
- Genus: Tinus
- Species: T. peregrinus

Binomial name
- Tinus peregrinus (Bishop, 1924)

= Tinus peregrinus =

Species of spider

Tinus peregrinus is a species of nursery web spider in the family Pisauridae. It is found in the United States and Mexico.
