= Maypacius =

Scientific classification
- Kingdom: Animalia
- Phylum: Arthropoda
- Subphylum: Chelicerata
- Class: Arachnida
- Order: Araneae
- Infraorder: Araneomorphae
- Family: Pisauridae
- Genus: Maypacius; Simon, 1898

Type species
- M. bilineatus (Pavesi, 1895)

Species
- 9, see text

Genus of spiders

Maypacius is a genus of African nursery web spiders that was first described by Eugène Louis Simon in 1898.

== Distribution ==
Spiders in this genus are found in many parts of Africa, including Madagascar.

== Life style ==
These spiders occur in the savanna and are found in vegetation.

== Description ==
The carapace is longer than wide and narrower in the eye region, with a sloping clypeus bearing projections. The anterior eye row is strongly procurved, with the anterior lateral eyes not on tubercles but located nearly below the anterior median eyes. The posterior eye row is strongly recurved.

The cheliceral furrow has two teeth that are equal in size. The abdomen is elongated and tapers towards the back. The legs have three claws and are relatively long.

== Taxonomy ==
The African species have not been revised, although Blandin described some species in 1975.

== Species ==
As of October 2024, the World Spider Catalog accepted nine species, found only in Africa:

- Maypacius bilineatus (Pavesi, 1895) (type) – Central, East Africa, Madagascar
- Maypacius christophei Blandin, 1975 – Congo
- Maypacius curiosus Blandin, 1975 – Congo
- Maypacius gilloni Blandin, 1978 – Senegal
- Maypacius kaestneri Roewer, 1955 – West, Central Africa
- Maypacius petrunkevitchi Lessert, 1933 – Angola, Rwanda
- Maypacius roeweri Blandin, 1975 – Congo
- Maypacius stuhlmanni (Bösenberg & Lenz, 1895) – Tanzania (mainland, Zanzibar)
- Maypacius vittiger Simon, 1898 – Madagascar
