= Paracladycnis =

Scientific classification
- Kingdom: Animalia
- Phylum: Arthropoda
- Subphylum: Chelicerata
- Class: Arachnida
- Order: Araneae
- Infraorder: Araneomorphae
- Family: Pisauridae
- Genus: Paracladycnis; Blandin, 1979
- Species: P. vis

Binomial name
- Paracladycnis vis Blandin, 1979

Genus of spiders

Paracladycnis is a monotypic genus of Malagasy nursery web spiders containing the single species, Paracladycnis vis. It was first described by P. Blandin in 1979, and is only found on Madagascar.
