= Archipirata =

Scientific classification
- Kingdom: Animalia
- Phylum: Arthropoda
- Subphylum: Chelicerata
- Class: Arachnida
- Order: Araneae
- Infraorder: Araneomorphae
- Family: Pisauridae
- Genus: Archipirata; Simon, 1898
- Species: A. tataricus

Binomial name
- Archipirata tataricus Simon, 1898

Genus of spiders

Archipirata is a monotypic genus of Asian nursery web spiders containing the single species, Archipirata tataricus. It was first described by Eugène Louis Simon in 1898, and is only found in Asia and Turkmenistan.
