= Rothus auratus =

Garies Rothus nursery-web spider

Scientific classification
- Kingdom: Animalia
- Phylum: Arthropoda
- Subphylum: Chelicerata
- Class: Arachnida
- Order: Araneae
- Infraorder: Araneomorphae
- Family: Pisauridae
- Genus: Rothus
- Species: R. auratus

Binomial name
- Rothus auratus Pocock, 1900

Species of spider

Rothus auratus is a spider species in the family Pisauridae. The species is commonly known as the Garies Rothus nursery-web spider.

== Distribution ==
Rothus auratus is endemic to South Africa, where it has been sampled from three provinces: Eastern Cape, Northern Cape, and Western Cape.

== Habitat and ecology ==
These are plant-living nursery-web spiders that are found on vegetation at night. Their movements are erratic but they move swiftly on the substrate, sometimes in leaps or jumps.

The species has been sampled from the Fynbos and Succulent Karoo biomes at altitudes ranging from 327 to 1307 m.

== Conservation ==
Rothus auratus is listed as Least Concern. Although the species is presently known only from females, it has a wide geographical range. The species is protected in Oorlogskloof Nature Reserve and Cederberg Wilderness Area. There are no significant threats to the species.

== Taxonomy ==
The species was described by Pocock in 1900 from Garies in the Northern Cape. It was revised by Silva and Sierwald in 2015 and is known only from the female.
