= Vuattouxia =

Scientific classification
- Kingdom: Animalia
- Phylum: Arthropoda
- Subphylum: Chelicerata
- Class: Arachnida
- Order: Araneae
- Infraorder: Araneomorphae
- Family: Pisauridae
- Genus: Vuattouxia; Blandin, 1979
- Species: V. kouassikonani

Binomial name
- Vuattouxia kouassikonani Blandin, 1979

Genus of spiders

Vuattouxia is a monotypic genus of Ivorian nursery web spiders containing the single species, Vuattouxia kouassikonani. It was first described by P. Blandin in 1979, and is only found in the Ivory Coast.
