= Cladycnis =

Scientific classification
- Kingdom: Animalia
- Phylum: Arthropoda
- Subphylum: Chelicerata
- Class: Arachnida
- Order: Araneae
- Infraorder: Araneomorphae
- Family: Pisauridae
- Genus: Cladycnis; Simon, 1898
- Species: C. insignis

Binomial name
- Cladycnis insignis (Lucas, 1838)

Genus of spiders

Cladycnis is a monotypic genus of nursery web spiders containing the single species, Cladycnis insignis. It was first described by Eugène Louis Simon in 1898, and is endemic to the Canary Islands.
