= Thalassiopsis =

Scientific classification
- Kingdom: Animalia
- Phylum: Arthropoda
- Subphylum: Chelicerata
- Class: Arachnida
- Order: Araneae
- Infraorder: Araneomorphae
- Family: Pisauridae
- Genus: Thalassiopsis; Roewer, 1955
- Species: T. vachoni

Binomial name
- Thalassiopsis vachoni Roewer, 1955

Genus of spiders

Thalassiopsis is a monotypic genus of Malagasy nursery web spiders containing the single species, Thalassiopsis vachoni. It was first described by Carl Friedrich Roewer in 1955, and is only found on Madagascar.
