= Cispinilus =

Scientific classification
- Kingdom: Animalia
- Phylum: Arthropoda
- Subphylum: Chelicerata
- Class: Arachnida
- Order: Araneae
- Infraorder: Araneomorphae
- Family: Pisauridae
- Genus: Cispinilus; Roewer, 1955
- Species: C. flavidus

Binomial name
- Cispinilus flavidus (Simon, 1910)

Genus of spiders

Cispinilus is a monotypic genus of Central African nursery web spiders containing the single species, Cispinilus flavidus. It was first described by Carl Friedrich Roewer in 1955, and is only found in Africa.
