= Tapinothele =

Scientific classification
- Kingdom: Animalia
- Phylum: Arthropoda
- Subphylum: Chelicerata
- Class: Arachnida
- Order: Araneae
- Infraorder: Araneomorphae
- Family: Pisauridae
- Genus: Tapinothele; Simon, 1898
- Species: T. astuta

Binomial name
- Tapinothele astuta Simon, 1898

Genus of spiders

Tapinothele is a monotypic genus of nursery web spiders containing the single species, Tapinothele astuta. It was first described by Eugène Louis Simon in 1898, and is only found on the Zanzibar Archipelago.
