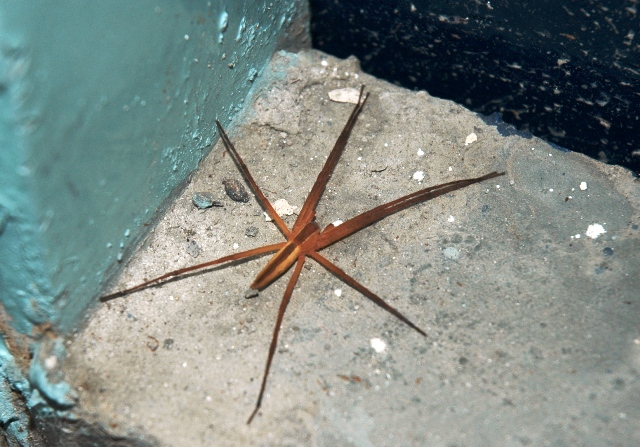

Scientific classification
- Domain: Eukaryota
- Kingdom: Animalia
- Phylum: Arthropoda
- Subphylum: Chelicerata
- Class: Arachnida
- Order: Araneae
- Infraorder: Araneomorphae
- Family: Pisauridae
- Genus: Nilus
- Species: N. albocinctus

Binomial name
- Nilus albocinctus (Doleschall, 1859)

= Nilus albocinctus =

Fishing spider

Species of spider

Nilus albocinctus, synonym Thalassius albocinctus, commonly called the fishing spider, is a species of spider found in tropical Asia from India to the Philippines. It is named after its habit of catching small fish. The spider is striking in appearance and can be easily recognised by the presence of a black, glossy, broad median band bordered by a white lateral band on the cephalothorax and abdomen. The legs are long and yellowish brown. It is usually found near water.

Female pisaurids create their egg case in one piece and carry it under their body with their chelicerae. This differs from similar looking female lycosids which construct their egg case in two pieces and fasten it behind them with their spinnerets.
