= Papakula =

Scientific classification
- Kingdom: Animalia
- Phylum: Arthropoda
- Subphylum: Chelicerata
- Class: Arachnida
- Order: Araneae
- Infraorder: Araneomorphae
- Family: Pisauridae
- Genus: Papakula; Strand, 1911
- Species: P. niveopunctata

Binomial name
- Papakula niveopunctata Strand, 1911

Synonyms
- Hesydrimorpha Strand, 1911

Genus of spiders

Papakula is a monotypic genus of nursery web spiders containing the single species, Papakula niveopunctata. It was first described by Embrik Strand in 1911, and is only found on the Aru Islands.
