= Polyboea (spider) =

Scientific classification
- Kingdom: Animalia
- Phylum: Arthropoda
- Subphylum: Chelicerata
- Class: Arachnida
- Order: Araneae
- Infraorder: Araneomorphae
- Family: Pisauridae
- Genus: Polyboea; Thorell, 1895

Type species
- P. vulpina Thorell, 1895

Species
- P. vulpina Thorell, 1895 – Myanmar, Thailand, Malaysia, Singapore; P. zonaformis (Wang, 1993) – India, China, Laos

Genus of spiders

Polyboea is a genus of Asian nursery web spiders that was first described by Tamerlan Thorell in 1895. As of June 2019 it contains only two species, found only in Asia: P. vulpina and P. zonaformis.
