= Voraptipus =

Scientific classification
- Kingdom: Animalia
- Phylum: Arthropoda
- Subphylum: Chelicerata
- Class: Arachnida
- Order: Araneae
- Infraorder: Araneomorphae
- Family: Pisauridae
- Genus: Voraptipus; Roewer, 1955
- Species: V. agilis

Binomial name
- Voraptipus agilis Roewer, 1955

Genus of spiders

Voraptipus is a monotypic genus of Mozambican nursery web spiders containing the single species, Voraptipus agilis. It was first described by Carl Friedrich Roewer in 1955, and is only found in Mozambique.
