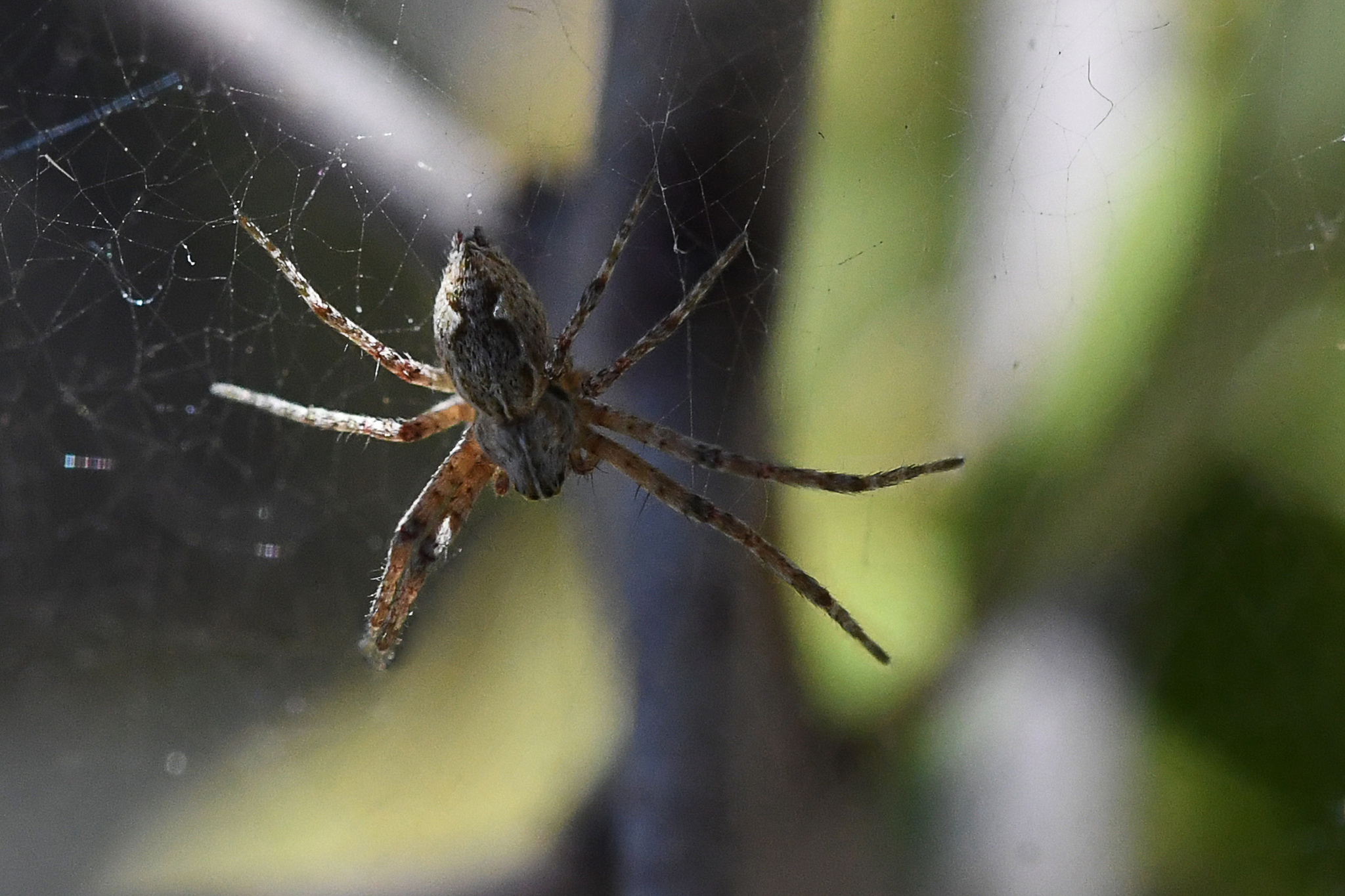
- W. globosa from Eastern Cape
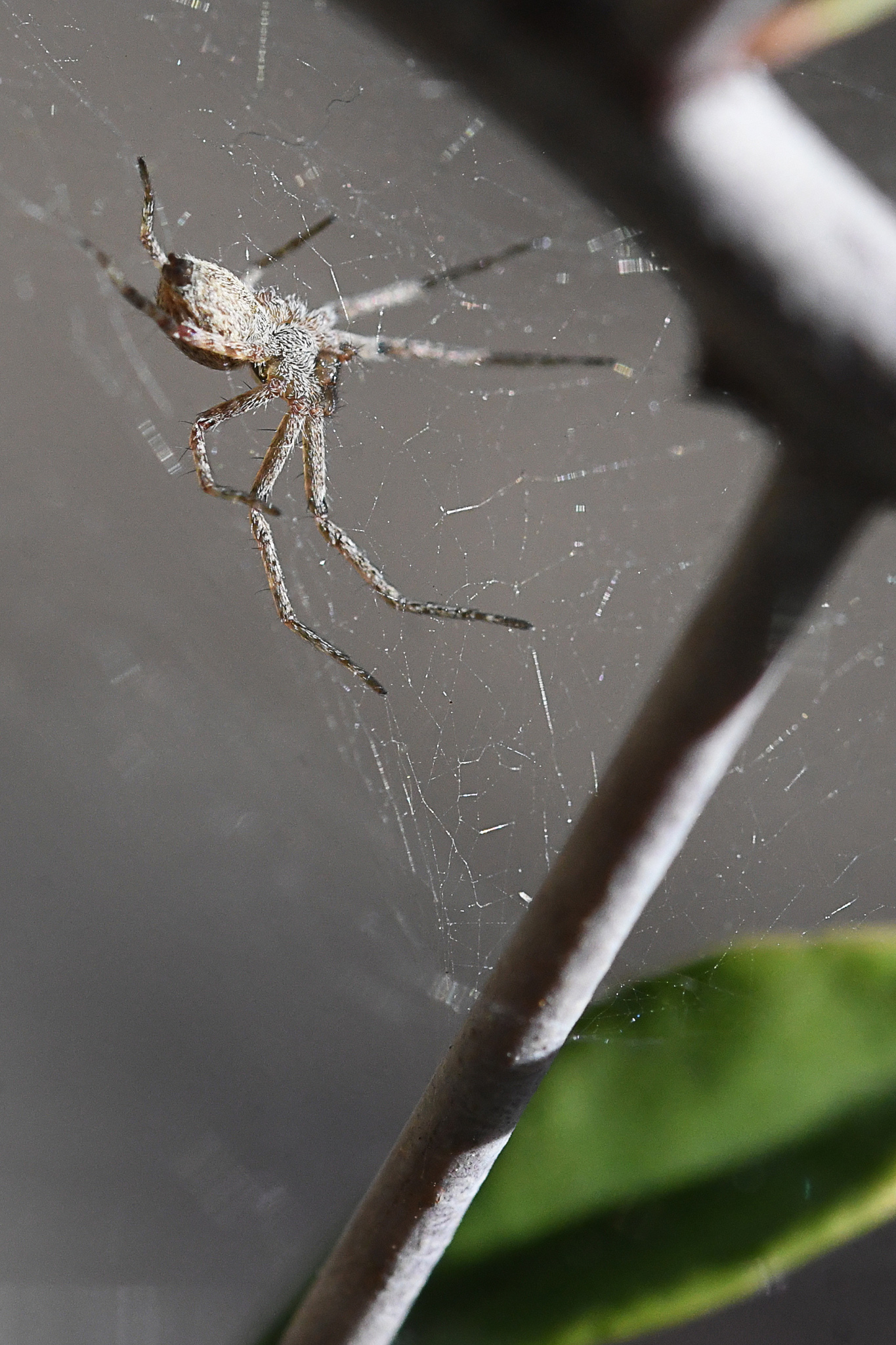

Scientific classification
- Kingdom: Animalia
- Phylum: Arthropoda
- Subphylum: Chelicerata
- Class: Arachnida
- Order: Araneae
- Infraorder: Araneomorphae
- Family: Pisauridae
- Genus: Walrencea; Blandin, 1979
- Species: W. globosa

Binomial name
- Walrencea globosa Blandin, 1979

= Walrencea =

Lawrence’s Nursery-web Spider

Genus of spiders

Walrencea is a monotypic genus of South African nursery web spiders containing the single species, Walrencea globosa. It was first described by Patrick Blandin in 1979, and is only found in South Africa.

== Etymology ==
The genus name is a variation of R. F. Lawrence's last name.

== Life style ==
These are free-living plant dwellers.

== Description ==
The carapace is a little longer than wide and narrower in the eye area, with a broad cephalic region and a short fovea. The carapace is covered with pale setae and has a white median line bordered by darker setae. The number of teeth on the posterior margins of the chelicerae is variable, ranging from 2 to 4.

The eight eyes are arranged in two rows, with the anterior row recurved.The median ocular triangle is longer than wide.

The abdomen has a slightly dark abdominal folium that is marked anteriorly with a short pale midline framed by dark setae, and the ventrum is pale. The legs are the same colour as the carapace and bear strong setae.

== Taxonomy ==
The genus is known only from the original description.
