= Ilipula =

Scientific classification
- Kingdom: Animalia
- Phylum: Arthropoda
- Subphylum: Chelicerata
- Class: Arachnida
- Order: Araneae
- Infraorder: Araneomorphae
- Family: Pisauridae
- Genus: Ilipula; Simon, 1903
- Species: I. anguicula

Binomial name
- Ilipula anguicula Simon, 1903

Genus of spiders

Ilipula is a monotypic genus of Vietnamese nursery web spiders containing the single species, Ilipula anguicula. It was first described by Eugène Louis Simon in 1903, and is only found in Vietnam.
