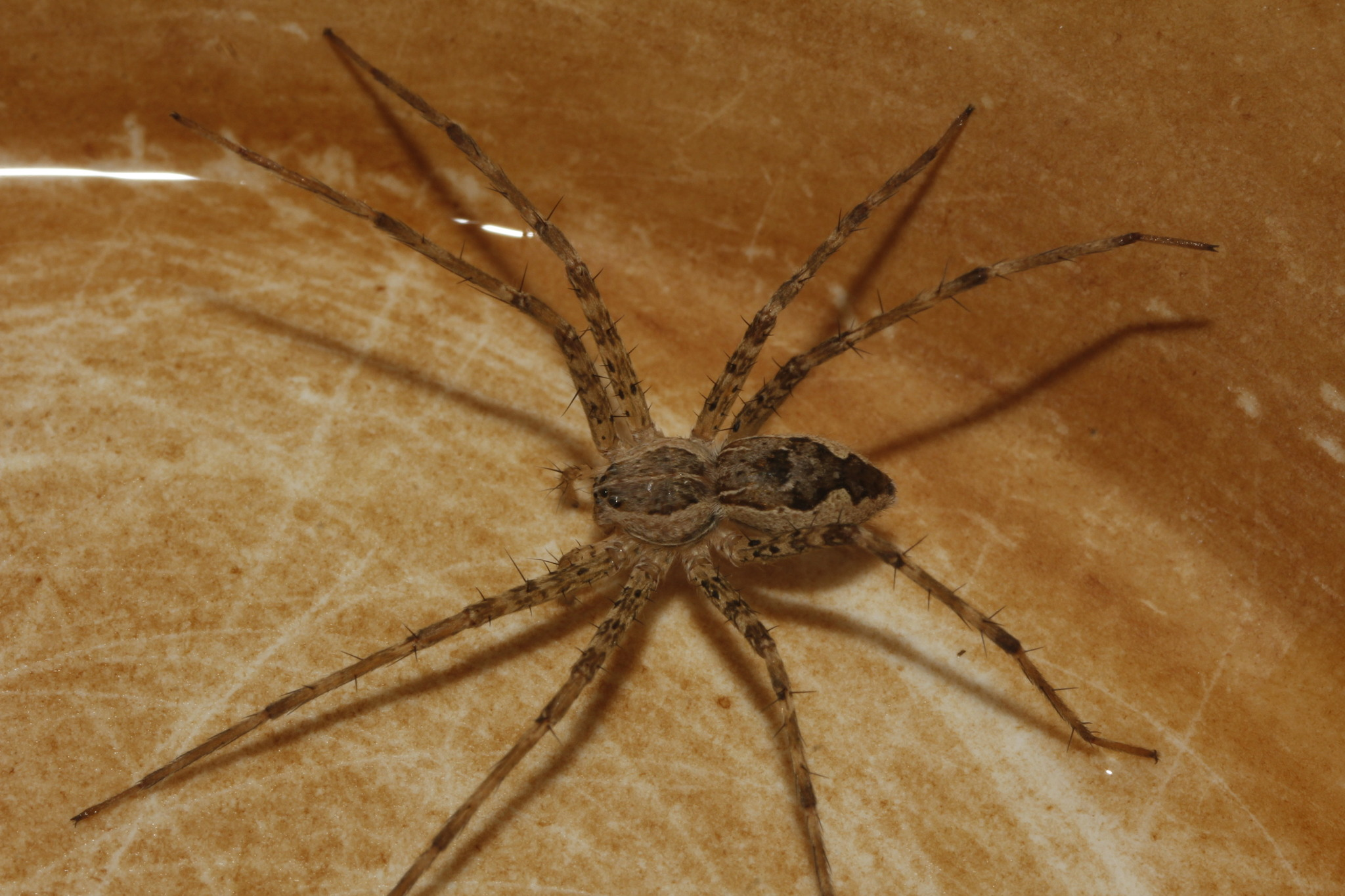
- Tinus peregrinus
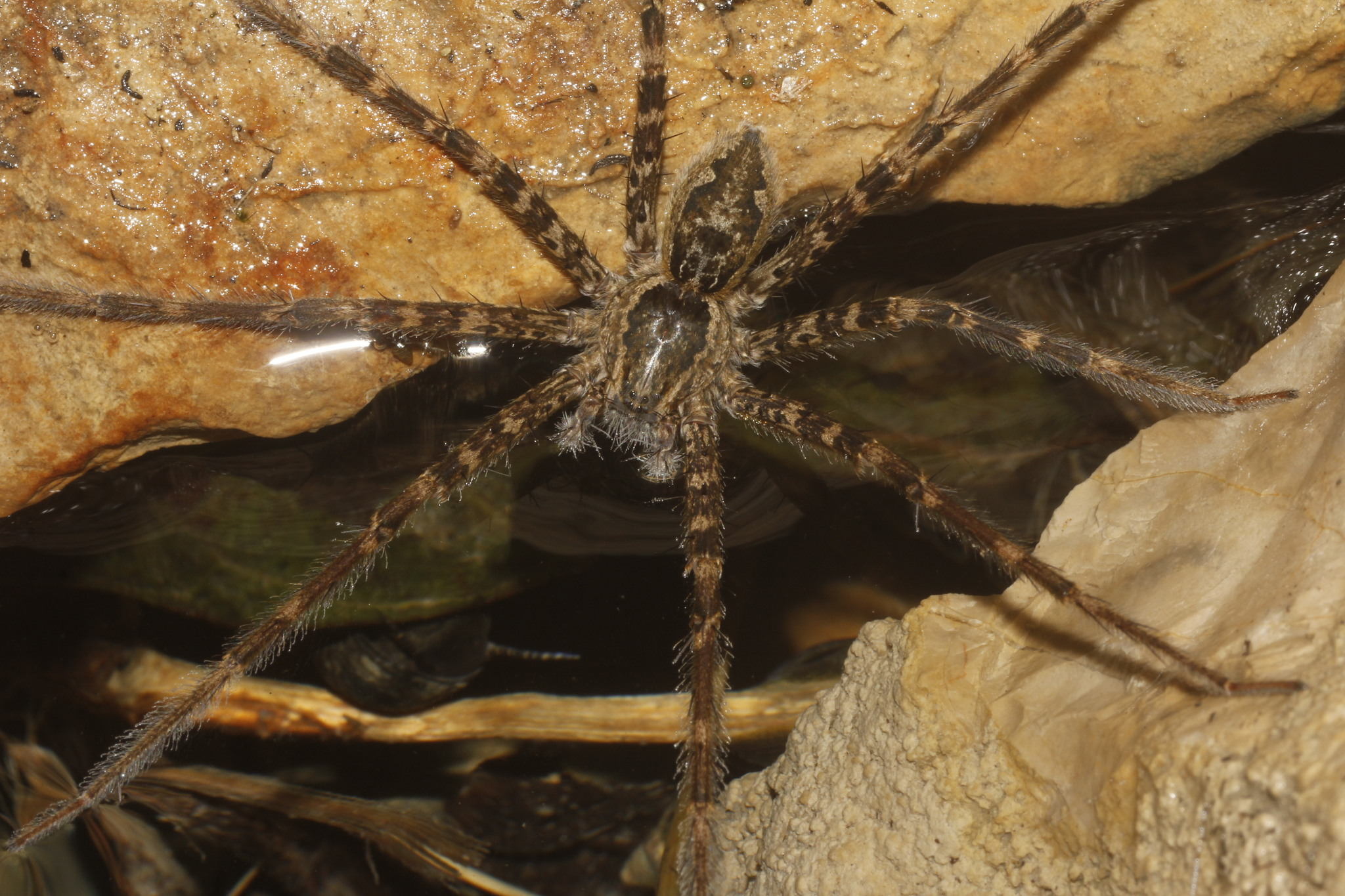
- T. nigrinus in Mexico

Scientific classification
- Kingdom: Animalia
- Phylum: Arthropoda
- Subphylum: Chelicerata
- Class: Arachnida
- Order: Araneae
- Infraorder: Araneomorphae
- Family: Pisauridae
- Genus: Tinus; F. O. Pickard-Cambridge, 1901

Type species
- T. nigrinus F. O. Pickard-Cambridge, 1901

Species
- 11, see text

= Tinus (spider) =

Genus of spiders

Tinus is a genus of nursery web spiders that was first described by Frederick Octavius Pickard-Cambridge in 1901.

== Distribution ==
Spiders in this genus are found in Central America, the United States, Mexico, India, Cuba, and on the Greater Antilles.

== Species ==
As of January 2026, this genus includes ten species:

- Tinus arindamai Biswas & Roy, 2005 – India
- Tinus connexus (Bryant, 1940) – Cuba, Dominican Republic
- Tinus minutus F. O. Pickard-Cambridge, 1901 – Mexico, Guatemala, El Salvador
- Tinus nigrinus F. O. Pickard-Cambridge, 1901 – Mexico, Guatemala, Costa Rica
- Tinus oaxaca Carico, 2008 – Mexico
- Tinus palictlus Carico, 1976 – Mexico
- Tinus peregrinus (Bishop, 1924) – United States, Mexico
- Tinus prusius Carico, 1976 – Mexico
- Tinus schlingeri Silva, 2012 – Mexico
- Tinus tibialis F. O. Pickard-Cambridge, 1901 – Mexico

== See also ==
- Dobarakuku ursus, a species formerly placed in this genus
