= Maypacius christophei =

Christoph's Maypacius nursery-web spider

Scientific classification
- Kingdom: Animalia
- Phylum: Arthropoda
- Subphylum: Chelicerata
- Class: Arachnida
- Order: Araneae
- Infraorder: Araneomorphae
- Family: Pisauridae
- Genus: Maypacius
- Species: M. christophei

Binomial name
- Maypacius christophei Blandin, 1975

Species of spider

Maypacius christophei is a spider species in the family Pisauridae. The species is commonly known as Christoph's Maypacius nursery-web spider.

== Distribution ==
Maypacius christophei has been recorded from the Democratic Republic of the Congo and South Africa. In South Africa, the species is known only from Gauteng.

== Habitat and ecology ==
The species makes sheet-webs in vegetation and is active at night.

It has been sampled from the Savanna biome at 1,247 m.

== Conservation ==
Maypacius christophei is listed as Least Concern. Although the species is presently known only from females, it has a wide geographical range in Africa. There are no significant threats to the species, but more sampling is needed to confirm the species range in South Africa.

== Taxonomy ==
The species was described by the French arachnologist Patrick Blandin in 1975 from a female specimen found in the Democratic Republic of the Congo. As of 2025, the male of the species remains undescribed.
