= Blandinia =

Scientific classification
- Kingdom: Animalia
- Phylum: Arthropoda
- Subphylum: Chelicerata
- Class: Arachnida
- Order: Araneae
- Infraorder: Araneomorphae
- Family: Pisauridae
- Genus: Blandinia; Tonini, Silva, Filho & Freitas, 2016
- Species: B. mahasoana

Binomial name
- Blandinia mahasoana (Blandin, 1979)

Genus of spiders

Blandinia is a monotypic genus of spiders in the family Pisauridae. It was first described in 2016 by Tonini et al. as a replacement name for Ransonia. As of 2017, it contains only one species, Blandinia mahasoana, from Madagascar.
