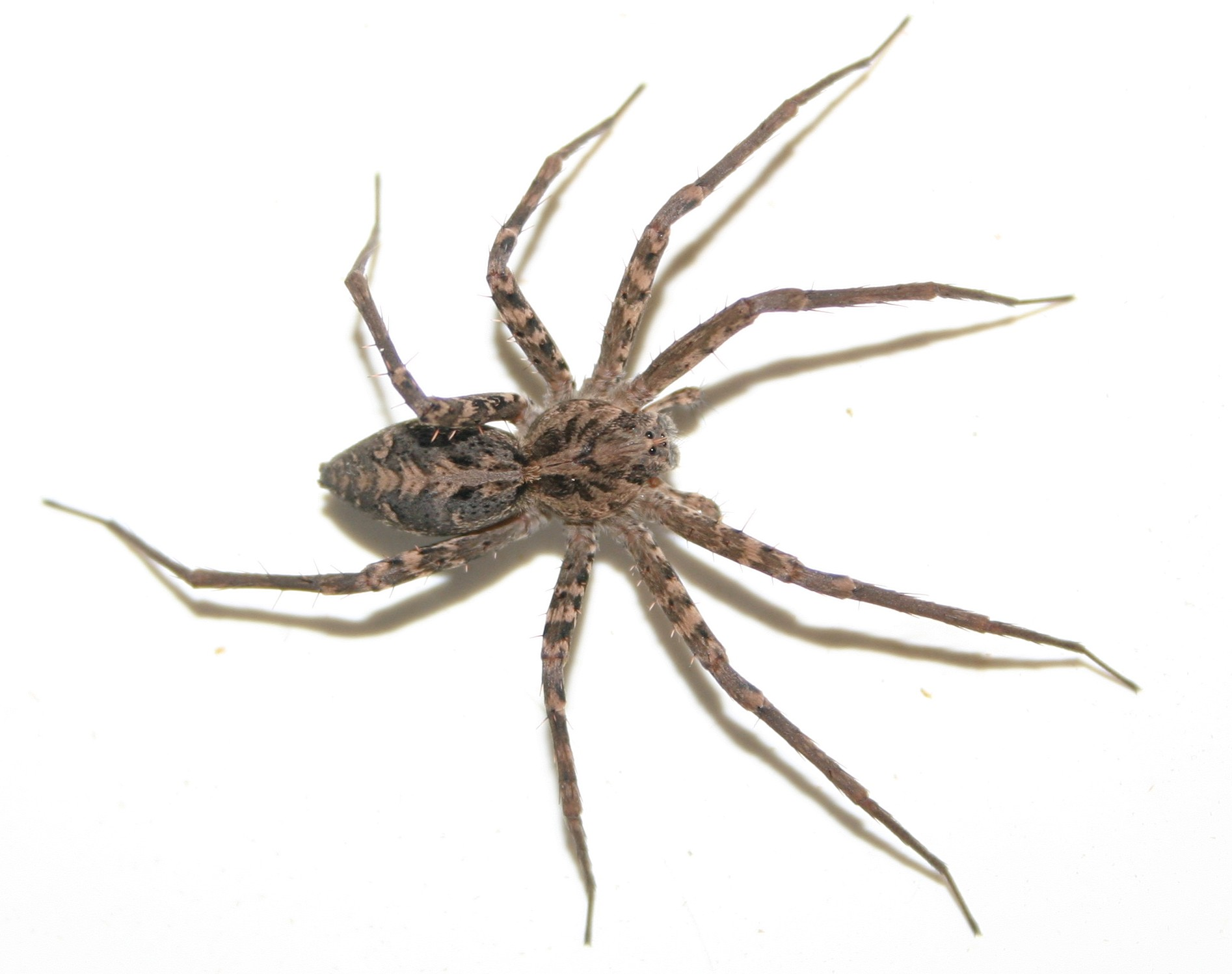
- R. aethiopicus
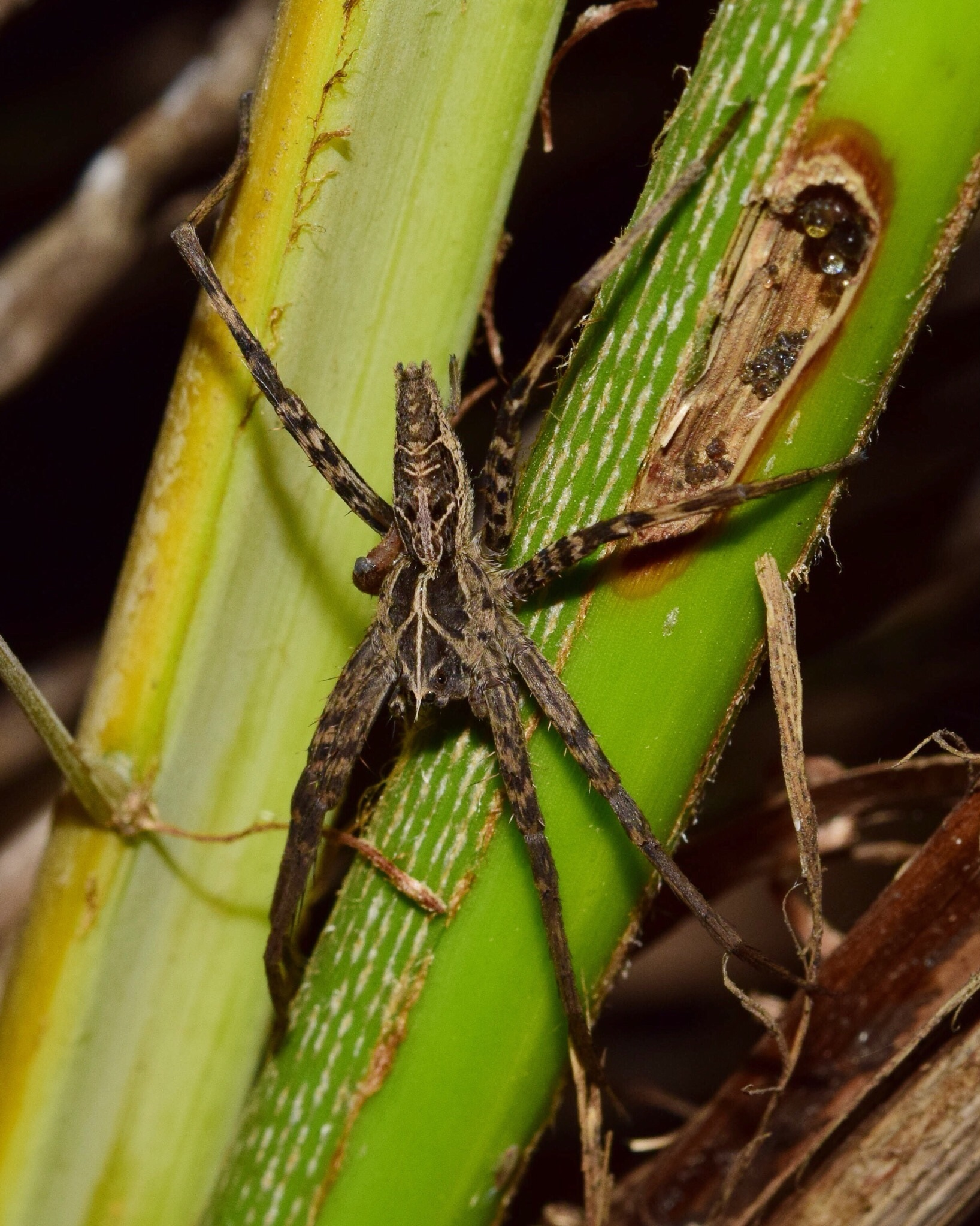
- R. vittatus

Scientific classification
- Kingdom: Animalia
- Phylum: Arthropoda
- Subphylum: Chelicerata
- Class: Arachnida
- Order: Araneae
- Infraorder: Araneomorphae
- Family: Pisauridae
- Genus: Rothus; Simon, 1898

Species
- R. aethiopicus (Pavesi, 1883); R. auratus Pocock, 1900; R. vittatus Simon, 1898

= Rothus =

Genus of spiders

Rothus is a genus of nursery web spiders that was first described by Eugène Louis Simon in 1898. Its three species are found in Africa, with R. aethiopicus reaching into Israel.

== Life style ==
These are free-running plant dwellers found in vegetation and are active at night. Some species sometimes wander into residences.

== Description ==
Members of this genus can be distinguished from all other African pisaurid genera by having three cheliceral teeth on the retromargin, an anterior eye row that is slightly procurved, and a posterior eye row that is recurved and wider than the anterior eye row.

In males, the tegulum is large with a pronounced anterior projection, the conductor is large and pointed, the embolus is sickle-shaped, and the median apophysis is aligned and points almost horizontally retrolaterad. The retrolateral tibial apophysis is elongated and has a divided tip.

The female copulatory organs feature an anteriorly excavated middle field and prominent curved lateral lobes.

== Taxonomy ==
The genus was reviewed by Silva and Sierwald in 2015.

== Species ==
As of October 2025, this genus includes three species:

- Rothus aethiopicus (Pavesi, 1883) – Cameroon, Ethiopia, DR Congo, Rwanda, Kenya, Angola, Mozambique, South Africa, Eswatini, Egypt, Israel (type species)
- Rothus auratus Pocock, 1900 – South Africa
- Rothus vittatus Simon, 1898 – South Africa
