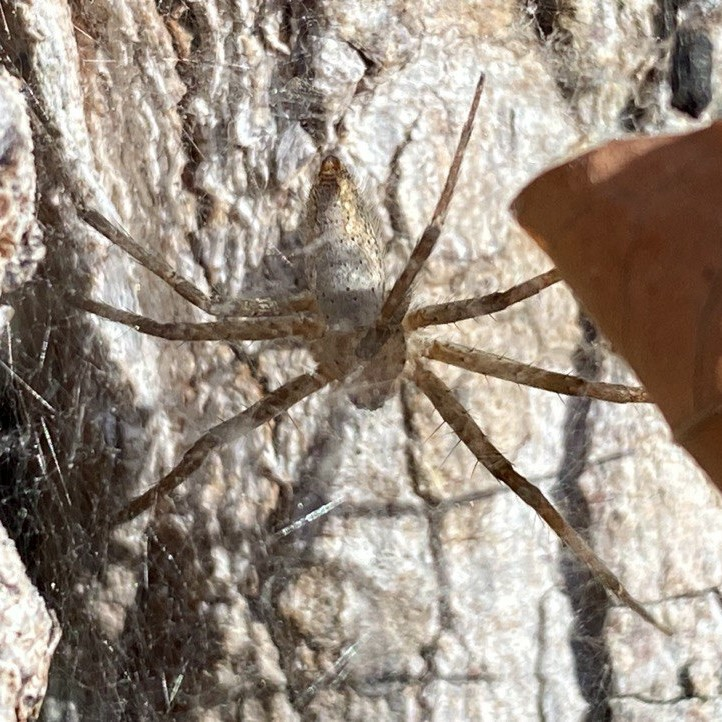

Scientific classification
- Kingdom: Animalia
- Phylum: Arthropoda
- Subphylum: Chelicerata
- Class: Arachnida
- Order: Araneae
- Infraorder: Araneomorphae
- Family: Pisauridae
- Genus: Tallonia; Simon, 1889
- Species: T. picta

Binomial name
- Tallonia picta Simon, 1889

= Tallonia =

Tallonia picta

Genus of spiders

Tallonia is a monotypic genus of Malagasy nursery web spiders containing the single species, Tallonia picta. It was first described by Eugène Louis Simon in 1889, and is only found on Madagascar.
