= Conakrya =

Scientific classification
- Kingdom: Animalia
- Phylum: Arthropoda
- Subphylum: Chelicerata
- Class: Arachnida
- Order: Araneae
- Infraorder: Araneomorphae
- Family: Pisauridae
- Genus: Conakrya; Schmidt, 1956
- Species: C. wolffi

Binomial name
- Conakrya wolffi Schmidt, 1956

Genus of spiders

Conakrya is a monotypic genus of Guinean nursery web spiders containing the single species, Conakrya wolffi. It was first described by Günter E. W. Schmidt in 1956, and is only found in Guinea.
