= Caripetella =

Scientific classification
- Kingdom: Animalia
- Phylum: Arthropoda
- Subphylum: Chelicerata
- Class: Arachnida
- Order: Araneae
- Infraorder: Araneomorphae
- Family: Pisauridae
- Genus: Caripetella; Strand, 1928
- Species: C. madagascariensis

Binomial name
- Caripetella madagascariensis (Lenz, 1886)

Genus of spiders

Caripetella is a monotypic genus of East African nursery web spiders containing the single species, Caripetella madagascariensis. It was first described by Embrik Strand in 1928, and is only found on Comoros and on Madagascar.
