= Tetragonophthalma =

Scientific classification
- Kingdom: Animalia
- Phylum: Arthropoda
- Subphylum: Chelicerata
- Class: Arachnida
- Order: Araneae
- Infraorder: Araneomorphae
- Family: Pisauridae
- Genus: Tetragonophthalma; Karsch, 1878
- Species: T. vulpina

Binomial name
- Tetragonophthalma vulpina (Simon, 1898)

Genus of spiders

Tetragonophthalma is a monotypic genus of Central African nursery web spiders containing the single species, Tetragonophthalma vulpina. It was first described by Ferdinand Anton Franz Karsch in 1878, and is only found in Africa.
