= Perenethis symmetrica =

Scientific classification
- Kingdom: Animalia
- Phylum: Arthropoda
- Subphylum: Chelicerata
- Class: Arachnida
- Order: Araneae
- Infraorder: Araneomorphae
- Family: Pisauridae
- Genus: Perenethis
- Species: P. symmetrica

Binomial name
- Perenethis symmetrica (Lawrence, 1927)

Synonyms
- Tetragonophthalma symmetrica Lawrence, 1927; Pisaurellus badius Roewer, 1961; Perenethis huberti Blandin, 1975; Perenethis lejeunei Blandin, 1975

Species of spider

Perenethis symmetrica is a spider species in the family Pisauridae. The species is commonly known as the Namibia Perenethis nursery-web spider.

== Distribution ==
Perenethis symmetrica has been recorded from Senegal, Djibouti, Democratic Republic of the Congo, Kenya, Tanzania, Namibia, and South Africa.

In South Africa, the species has been sampled from four provinces: KwaZulu-Natal, Limpopo, Mpumalanga, and Western Cape.

== Habitat and ecology ==
The species constructs sheet-webs in vegetation.

It has been sampled from the Fynbos and Savanna biomes at altitudes ranging from 91 to 615 metres (299 to 2,018 ft). The species has also been sampled from maize.

== Conservation ==
Perenethis symmetrica is listed as Least Concern due to its wide geographical range. The species is protected in Kruger National Park. There are no significant threats to the species.

== Taxonomy ==
The species was originally described by R. F. Lawrence in 1927 as Tetragonophthalma symmetrica from Namibia. It was revised by Sierwald in 1997 and is known from both sexes.
