= Euprosthenopsis armata =

Euprosthenopsis Nursery-Web Spider

Scientific classification
- Kingdom: Animalia
- Phylum: Arthropoda
- Subphylum: Chelicerata
- Class: Arachnida
- Order: Araneae
- Infraorder: Araneomorphae
- Family: Pisauridae
- Genus: Euprosthenopsis
- Species: E. armata

Binomial name
- Euprosthenopsis armata (Strand, 1913)

Synonyms
- Euprosthenops armatus Strand, 1913; Euprosthenopsis armatus Blandin, 1974

Species of spider

Euprosthenopsis armata is a species of spider in the family Pisauridae. It is found across several African countries and is commonly known as the Euprosthenopsis nursery-web spider.

== Etymology ==
The species name armata is Latin meaning "armed", likely referring to some morphological feature of the species.

== Distribution ==
Euprosthenopsis armata has a distribution across Africa. It is found in the Democratic Republic of the Congo, Tanzania, Uganda, Eswatini, and South Africa. In South Africa, it has been recorded from four provinces at altitudes ranging from 159 to 1,663 m above sea level.

== Habitat and ecology ==
These sheet-web pisaurids construct their webs in bushes but occasionally also between grass tussocks. They run on top of the sheet-web. The species has been sampled from the Grassland and Savanna biomes.

== Conservation ==
Euprosthenopsis armata is listed as Least Concern by the South African National Biodiversity Institute due to its wide geographical range in Africa. There are no significant threats to the species, and it is protected in the Cederberg Wilderness Area, Mpetsane Conservation Estate, and Nylsvley Nature Reserve.

== Taxonomy ==
The species was originally described by Embrik Strand in 1913 as Euprosthenops armatus from Lake Albert. It was transferred to the genus Euprosthenopsis by Blandin in 1974 and revised by Blandin in 1977. It is known from both sexes.
