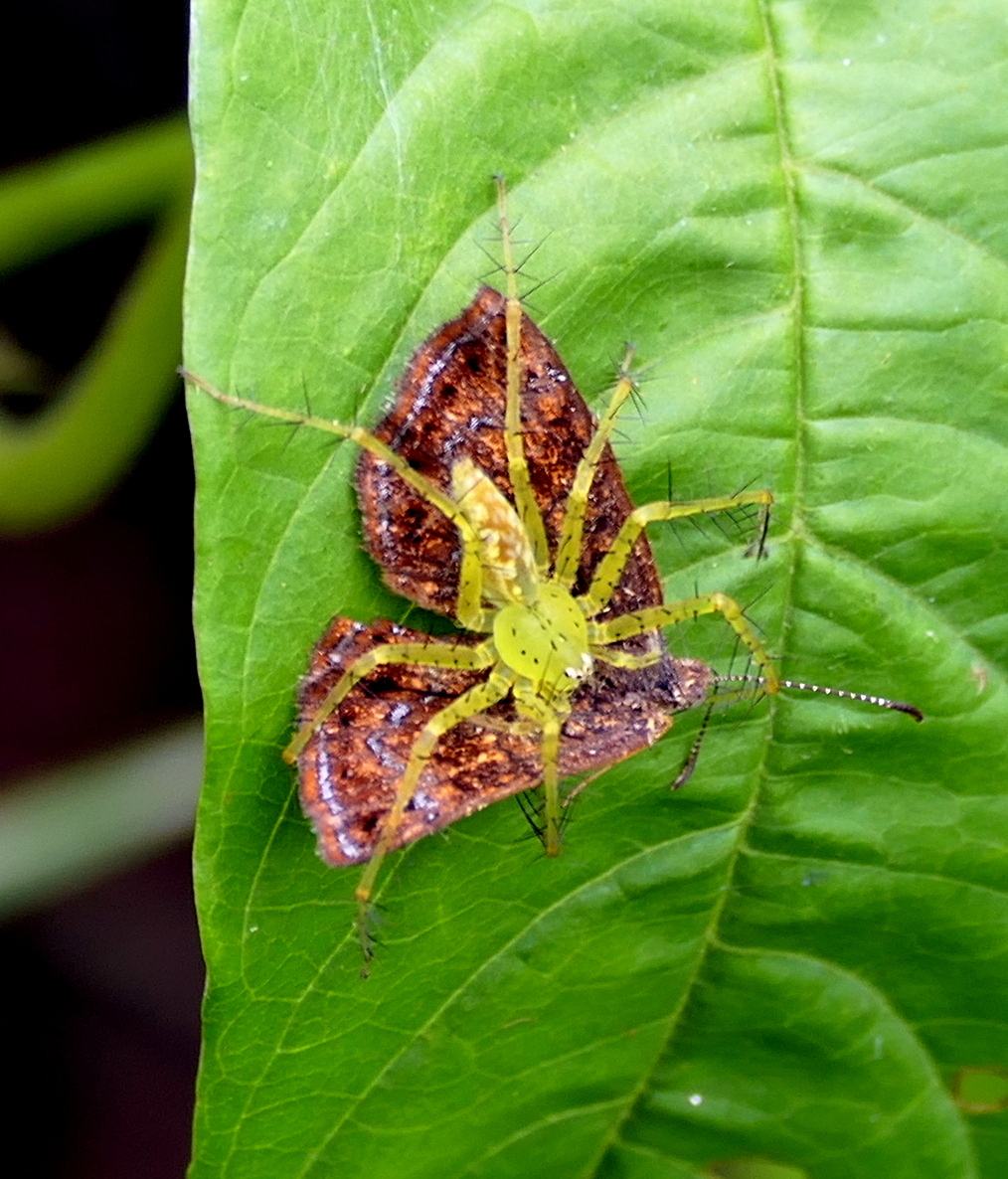
- A. spinipes with prey
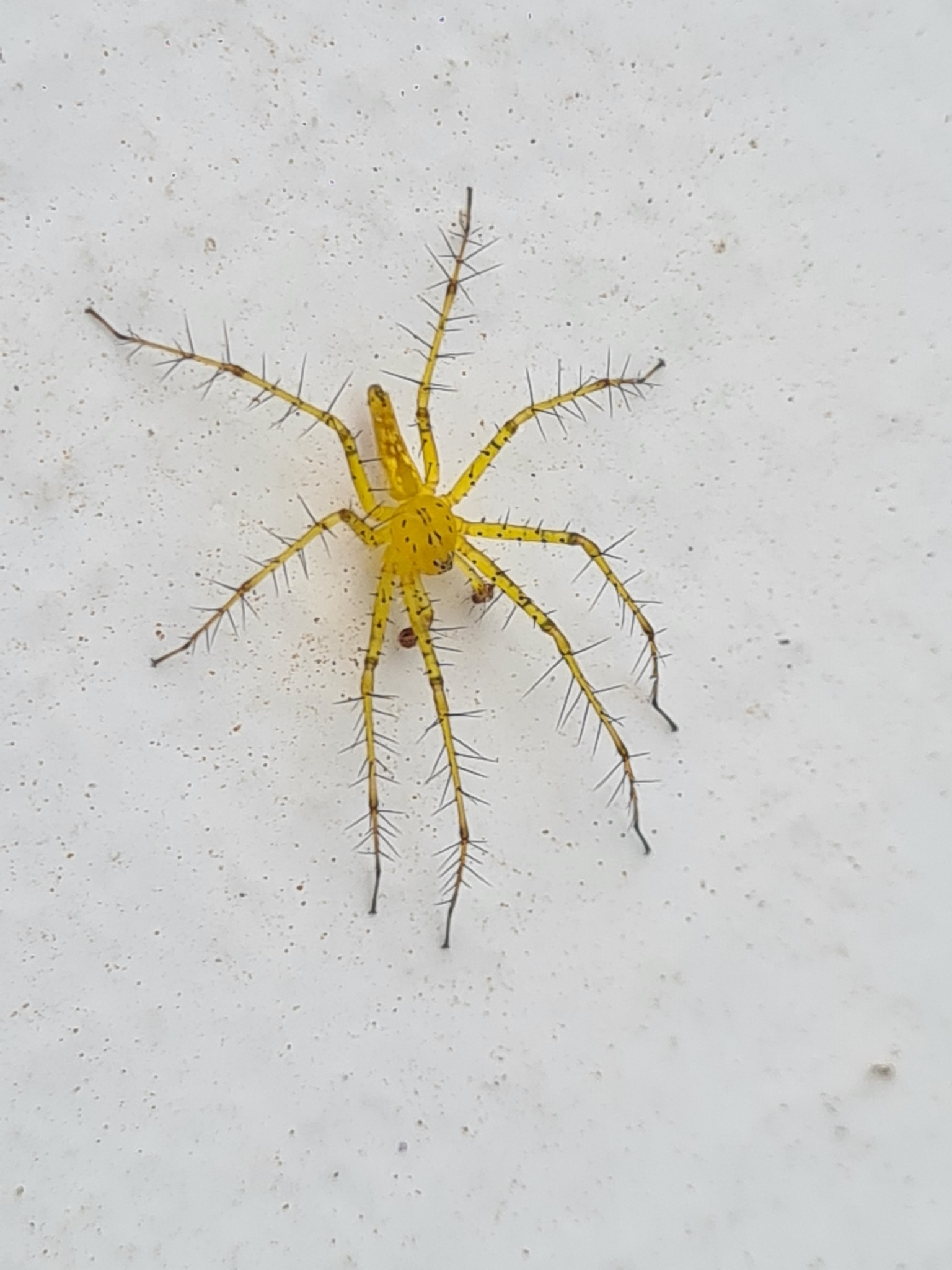

Scientific classification
- Kingdom: Animalia
- Phylum: Arthropoda
- Subphylum: Chelicerata
- Class: Arachnida
- Order: Araneae
- Infraorder: Araneomorphae
- Family: Pisauridae
- Genus: Architis
- Species: A. spinipes

Binomial name
- Architis spinipes (Taczanowski, 1874)

= Architis spinipes =

Species of spider

Architis spinipes is a species of spider from the genus Architis. The species was originally described as Ocyale spinipes in 1874 by Władysław Taczanowski.

== Description ==
Architis spinipes is a spider with a yellowish, fleshy body with a yellow abdomen with white spots and its legs bear long spines. The spider measures approximately 7.5 mm. in length, with front legs spanning 11 mm. and back legs measuring 10 mm. Another variant of this species is smaller, less than 6 mm long, with front legs measuring 15 mm and back legs measuring 13.5 mm.

== Range ==
When the spider was originally described, it was found in French Guiana. Later reports the species in Brazil. Observations from crowdsourcing initiatives suggest that the range of the A. spinipes covers the full tropical range of South America.

== Taxonomy ==
Originally Architis spinipes was named as Ocyale spinipes. Due to similarities with the Władysław_Taczanowski provisionally categorized the spider as part of the Ocyale genus, but also hinted at classifying it as a distinct genus situated in proximity to Oxyopes. Currently Architis spinipes has various taxonomic synonyms: Architis aculeatus (Simon, 1898), Architis benoisti (Caporiacco, 1954), Architis lemoulti (Caporiacco, 1954), Architis spinipes (F.O.Pickard-Cambridge, 1903), Architis spinosa (Petrunkevitch, 1925), Ocyale spinipes Taczanowski, 1874, Staberius lemoulti Caporiacco, 1954, Thaumasia benoisti Caporiacco, 1954.

== Look-a-likes ==
Architis spinipes resembles Architis tenuipes and Architis helveola.
