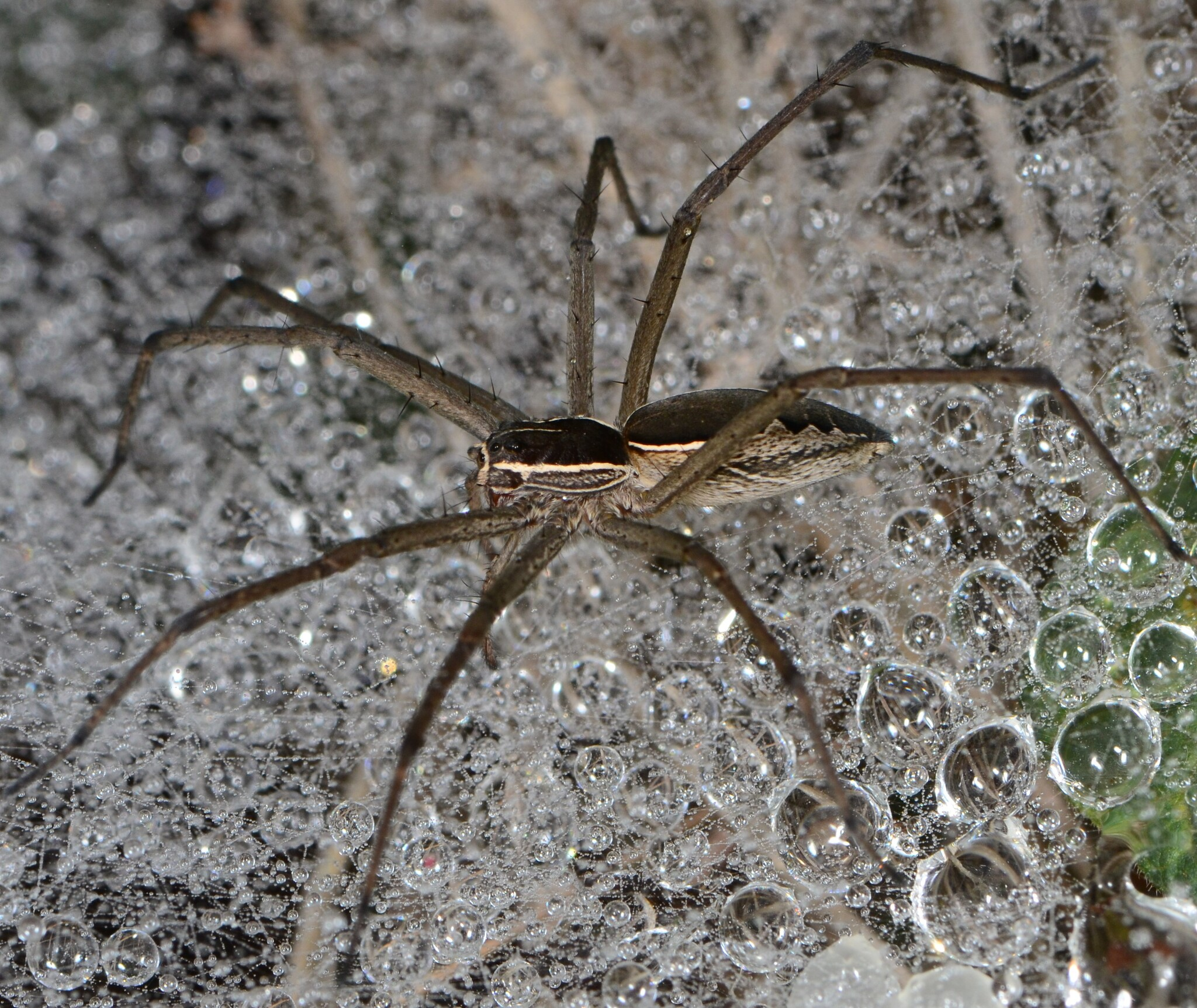
- female
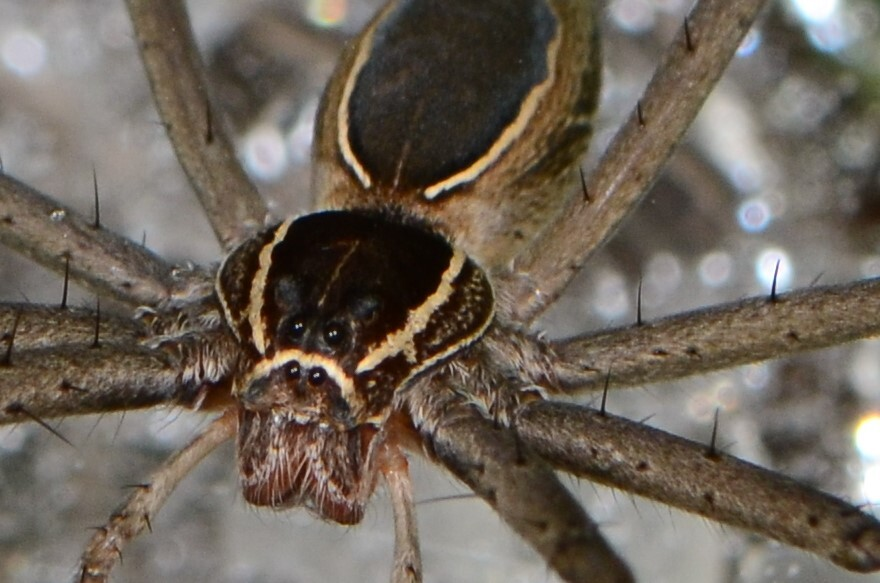
- female

Scientific classification
- Kingdom: Animalia
- Phylum: Arthropoda
- Subphylum: Chelicerata
- Class: Arachnida
- Order: Araneae
- Infraorder: Araneomorphae
- Family: Pisauridae
- Genus: Euprosthenopsis
- Species: E. pulchella

Binomial name
- Euprosthenopsis pulchella (Pocock, 1902)

Synonyms
- Euprosthenops pulchellus Pocock, 1902; Euprosthenopsis pulchellus Blandin, 1977

= Euprosthenopsis pulchella =

Common Euprosthenopsis Nursery-Web Spider

Species of spider

Euprosthenopsis pulchella is a species of spider in the family Pisauridae. It is found in southern Africa and is commonly known as the common Euprosthenopsis nursery-web spider.

== Distribution ==
Euprosthenopsis pulchella has a distribution in southern Africa. It is found in Lesotho, Eswatini, and South Africa. In South Africa, it has been recorded from six provinces at altitudes ranging from 5 to 1,557 m above sea level.

== Habitat and ecology ==
Sheet-web pisaurids construct their webs in bushes but occasionally also between large grass tussocks. They construct sheet webs in low vegetation. The species has been sampled from the Fynbos, Grassland, Nama Karoo, and Savanna biomes.

== Conservation ==
Euprosthenopsis pulchella is listed as Least Concern by the South African National Biodiversity Institute due to its wide range. There are no significant threats to the species, and it has been sampled from more than 10 protected areas.

== Etymology ==
The species name pulchella is Latin meaning "beautiful" or "pretty".

== Taxonomy ==
The species was originally described by Pocock in 1902 as Euprosthenops pulchellus from Grahamstown in the Eastern Cape. It was transferred to the genus Euprosthenopsis by Blandin in 1977. The male was first described by Silva & Sierwald in 2014, and the species is now known from both sexes.
