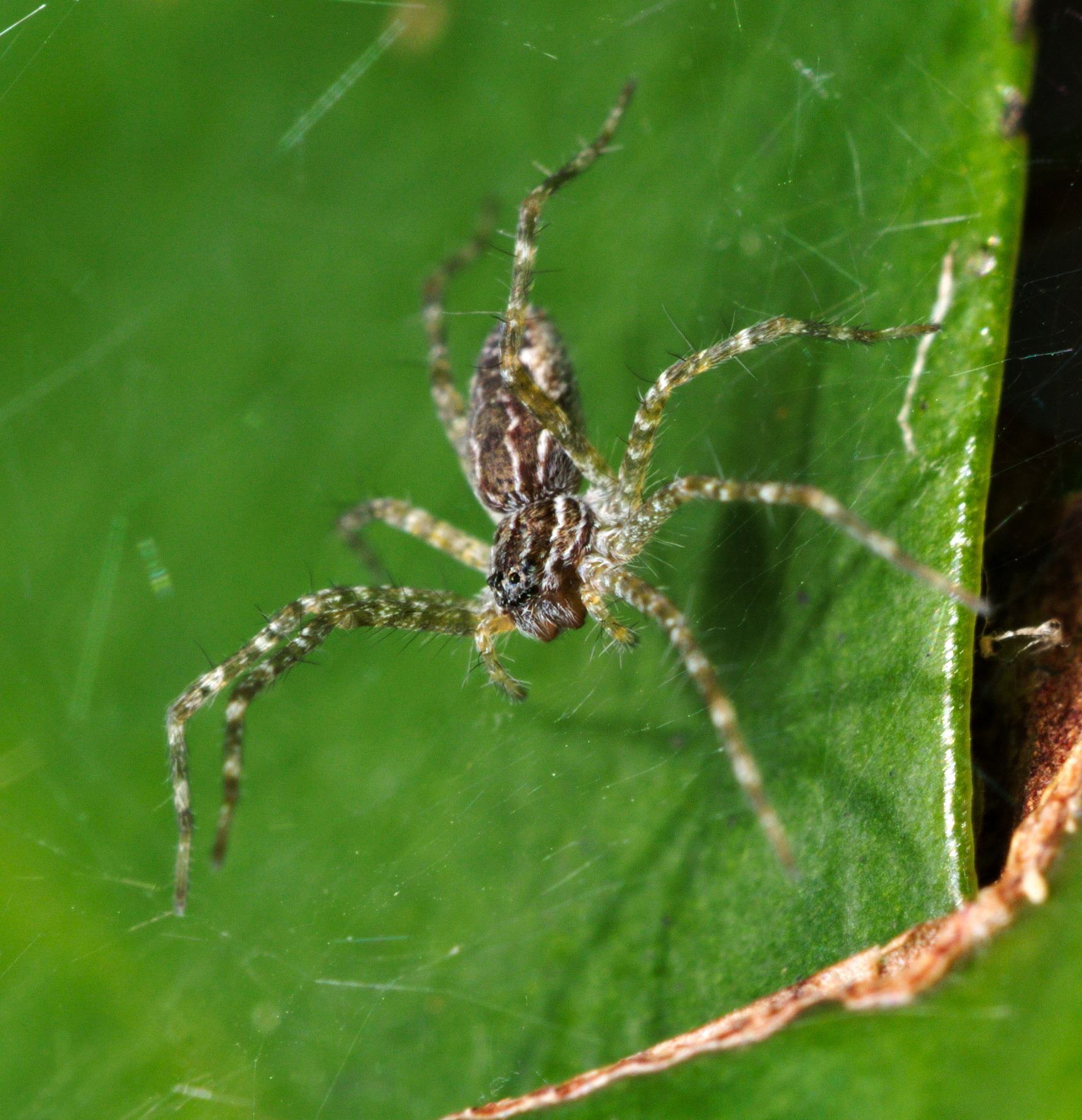
- D. robusta from Hong Kong

Scientific classification
- Kingdom: Animalia
- Phylum: Arthropoda
- Subphylum: Chelicerata
- Class: Arachnida
- Order: Araneae
- Infraorder: Araneomorphae
- Family: Pisauridae
- Genus: Dendrolycosa
- Species: D. robusta

Binomial name
- Dendrolycosa robusta (Thorell, 1895)

Synonyms
- Therimachus robustus Thorell, 1895; Nilus lanceolatus Simon, 1898; Pisaura lizhii Zhang, 2000; Dianpisaura lizhii (Zhang, 2000)

= Dendrolycosa robusta =

Species of spider

Dendrolycosa robusta is a species of spider in the family Pisauridae (nursery web spiders). Originally described as Therimachus robustus by Tamerlan Thorell in 1895, it was later transferred to the genus Dendrolycosa by Eugène Simon in 1898.

== Etymology ==
The specific name robusta is derived from the Latin word meaning "robust" or "strong", referring to the spider's sturdy build and relatively large size among pisaurids.

== Distribution ==
D. robusta has been recorded from India, Myanmar (formerly Burma), China (Yunnan Province), Laos (Vientiane Province), and Vietnam (southern regions). The type specimens were collected from Kyeikpadem and Tharrawaddy in Myanmar.

== Habitat ==
This species inhabits secondary forests and has been observed constructing webs on twigs of trees. Specimens have been collected at elevations around 186 meters above sea level.

== Description ==
Dendrolycosa robusta is a medium to large-sized spider with considerable sexual dimorphism. Females are notably larger than males, with body lengths ranging from 14.0–23.0 mm compared to males at 10.8–15.7 mm.

The species displays a distinctive color pattern characterized by a yellowish to reddish-brown base coloration. The cephalothorax features two broad, bright marginal bands composed of white feathered hairs. The opisthosoma shows a characteristic dark brown patch in the anterior half and a brown folium with undulating lateral margins in the posterior portion.

Males can be distinguished by their elongated palpal articles, while females are characterized by the presence of a large anterior vulval pocket in their epigyne. The chelicerae bear three anterior teeth (with the median being the largest) and three posterior teeth.

== Taxonomy ==
The species has a complex taxonomic history with several synonyms. Originally described by Thorell in 1895 as Therimachus robustus, it was transferred to Dendrolycosa by Simon in 1898. Two other species, Nilus lanceolatus Simon, 1898 and Pisaura lizhii Zhang, 2000 (later transferred to Dianpisaura), were subsequently recognized as synonyms through the revision work of Jäger in 2011.
