= Euprosthenopsis lamorali =

Lamoral's Euprosthenopsis Nursery-Web Spider

Conservation status
- Least Concern (SANBI Red List)

Scientific classification
- Kingdom: Animalia
- Phylum: Arthropoda
- Subphylum: Chelicerata
- Class: Arachnida
- Order: Araneae
- Infraorder: Araneomorphae
- Family: Pisauridae
- Genus: Euprosthenopsis
- Species: E. lamorali

Binomial name
- Euprosthenopsis lamorali Blandin, 1977

Species of spider

Euprosthenopsis lamorali is a species of spider in the family Pisauridae. It is endemic to South Africa and is commonly known as Lamoral's Euprosthenopsis nursery-web spider.

== Distribution ==
Euprosthenopsis lamorali is endemic to South Africa. It has been recorded from single localities in three provinces at altitudes ranging from 4 to 1,345 m above sea level.

== Habitat and ecology ==
These sheet-web pisaurids construct their webs in bushes but occasionally also between large grass tussocks. The species has been sampled from the Fynbos, Savanna, and Thicket biomes.

== Conservation ==
Euprosthenopsis lamorali is listed as Least Concern by the South African National Biodiversity Institute. Although only known from one sex, this species has a wide distribution and there are no significant threats to the species.

== Etymology ==
The species is named after arachnologist Bruno Herman Lamoral.

== Taxonomy ==
The species was originally described by Blandin in 1977 from Kluhlmoe Reserve in KwaZulu-Natal. This species is known from only the female.
