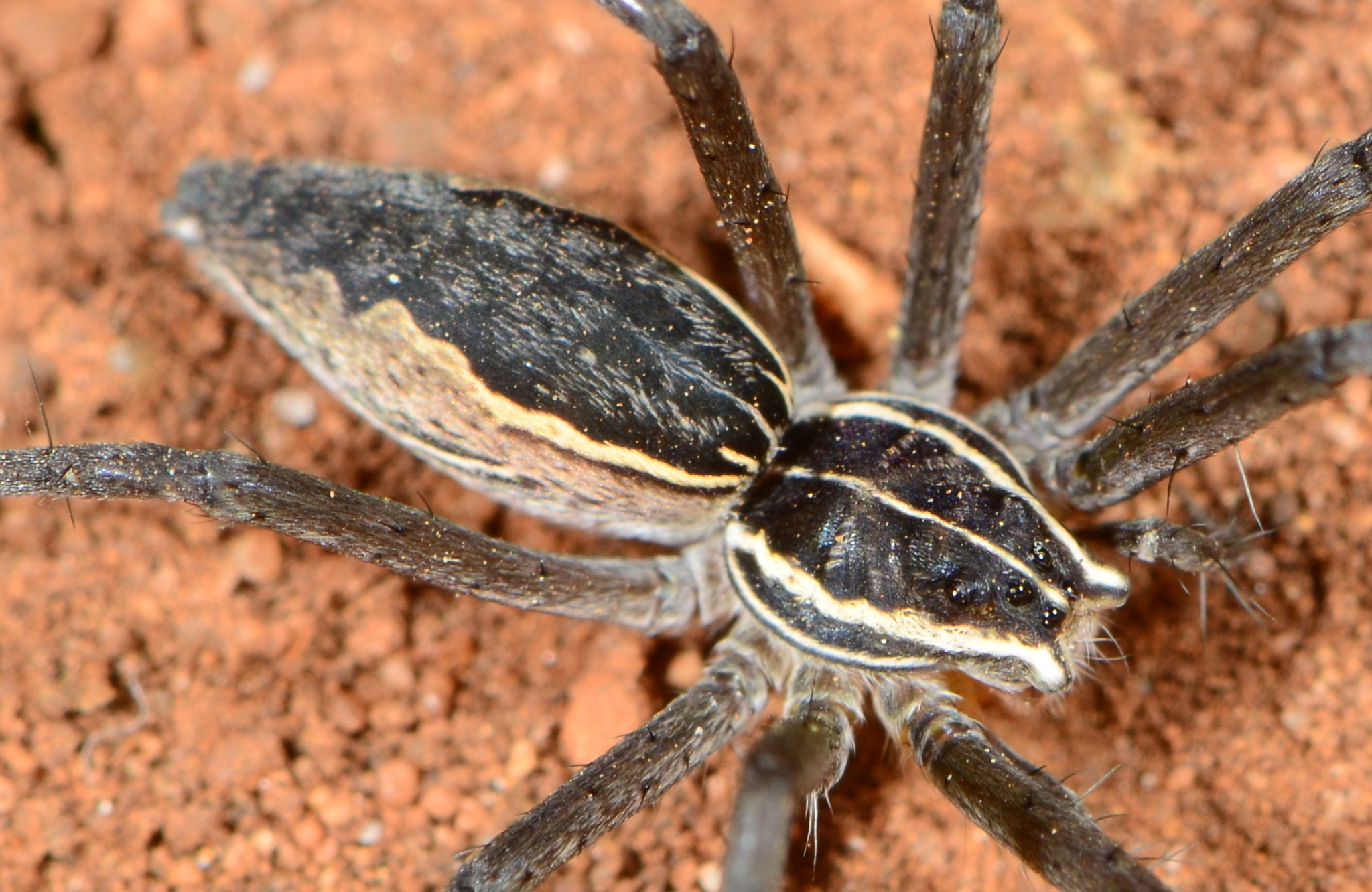
- female
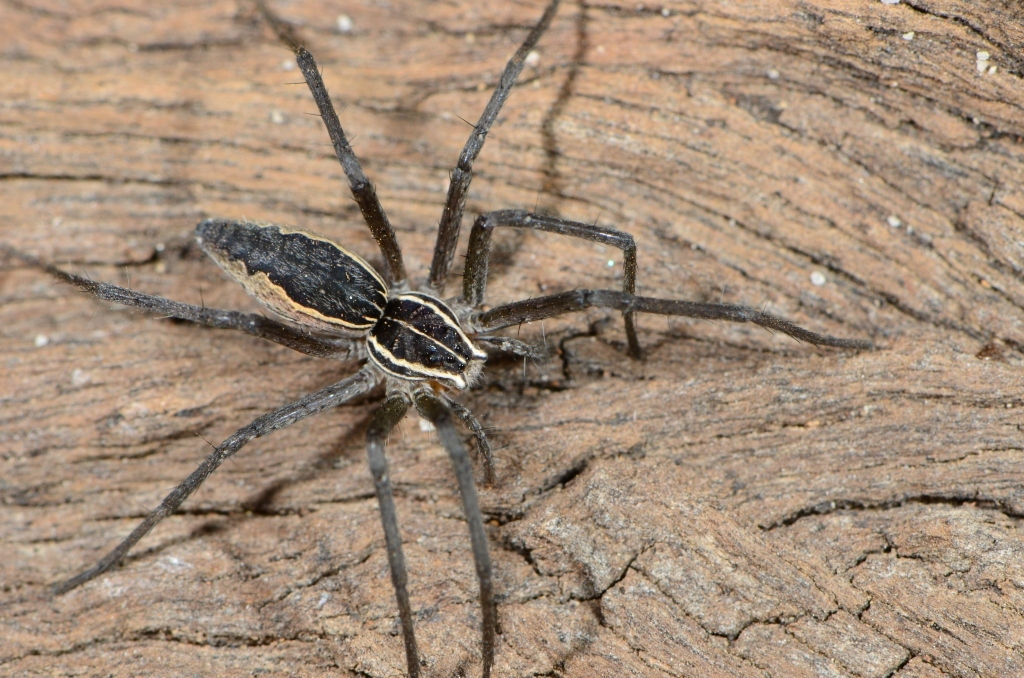
- female

Scientific classification
- Kingdom: Animalia
- Phylum: Arthropoda
- Subphylum: Chelicerata
- Class: Arachnida
- Order: Araneae
- Infraorder: Araneomorphae
- Family: Pisauridae
- Genus: Euprosthenopsis
- Species: E. vuattouxi

Binomial name
- Euprosthenopsis vuattouxi Blandin, 1977

= Euprosthenopsis vuattouxi =

Curvy-lined Euprosthenopsis Nursery-Web Spider

Species of spider

Euprosthenopsis vuattouxi is a species of spider in the family Pisauridae. It is found in Africa and is commonly known as the curvy-lined Euprosthenopsis nursery-web spider.

== Distribution ==
Euprosthenopsis vuattouxi has a distribution across Africa. It is found in the Ivory Coast and South Africa. In South Africa, it has been recorded from seven provinces at altitudes ranging from 1 to 1,478 m above sea level. This species is possibly under-collected and is suspected to occur in countries between Ivory Coast and South Africa.

== Habitat and ecology ==
Sheet-web pisaurids construct their webs in bushes but occasionally also between large grass tussocks. They construct sheet webs in low vegetation. The species has been sampled from the Grassland, Nama Karoo, and Savanna biomes.

== Conservation ==
Euprosthenopsis vuattouxi is listed as Least Concern by the South African National Biodiversity Institute due to its wide geographical range. There are no significant threats to the species, and it has been sampled from eight protected areas including Mkambati Nature Reserve, Roodeplaatdam Nature Reserve, Ezemvelo Nature Reserve, Ndumo Game Reserve, Blouberg Nature Reserve, Kruger National Park, Polokwane Nature Reserve, and Tswalu Game Reserve.

== Etymology ==
The species is named after French zoologist Roger Vuattoux (1940–2023).

== Taxonomy ==
The species was originally described by Blandin in 1977 from the Ivory Coast. It is known from both sexes.
