= Perenethis sindica =

Scientific classification
- Kingdom: Animalia
- Phylum: Arthropoda
- Subphylum: Chelicerata
- Class: Arachnida
- Order: Araneae
- Infraorder: Araneomorphae
- Family: Pisauridae
- Genus: Perenethis
- Species: P. sindica

Binomial name
- Perenethis sindica (Simon, 1897)

Species of spider

Perenethis sindica is a species of spider of the genus Perenethis. It is found in India, Sri Lanka, Nepal, China, and the Philippines.
