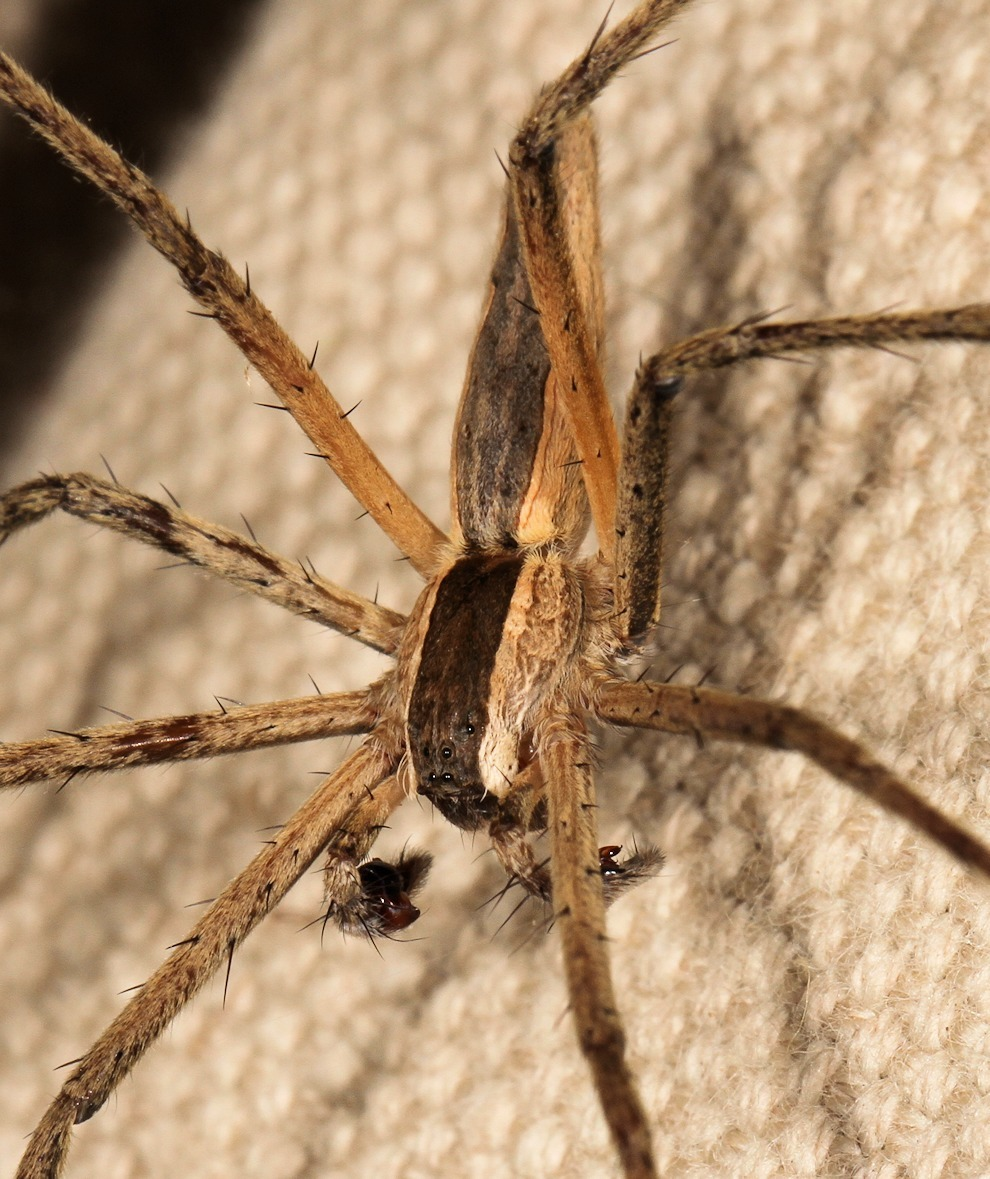
- male
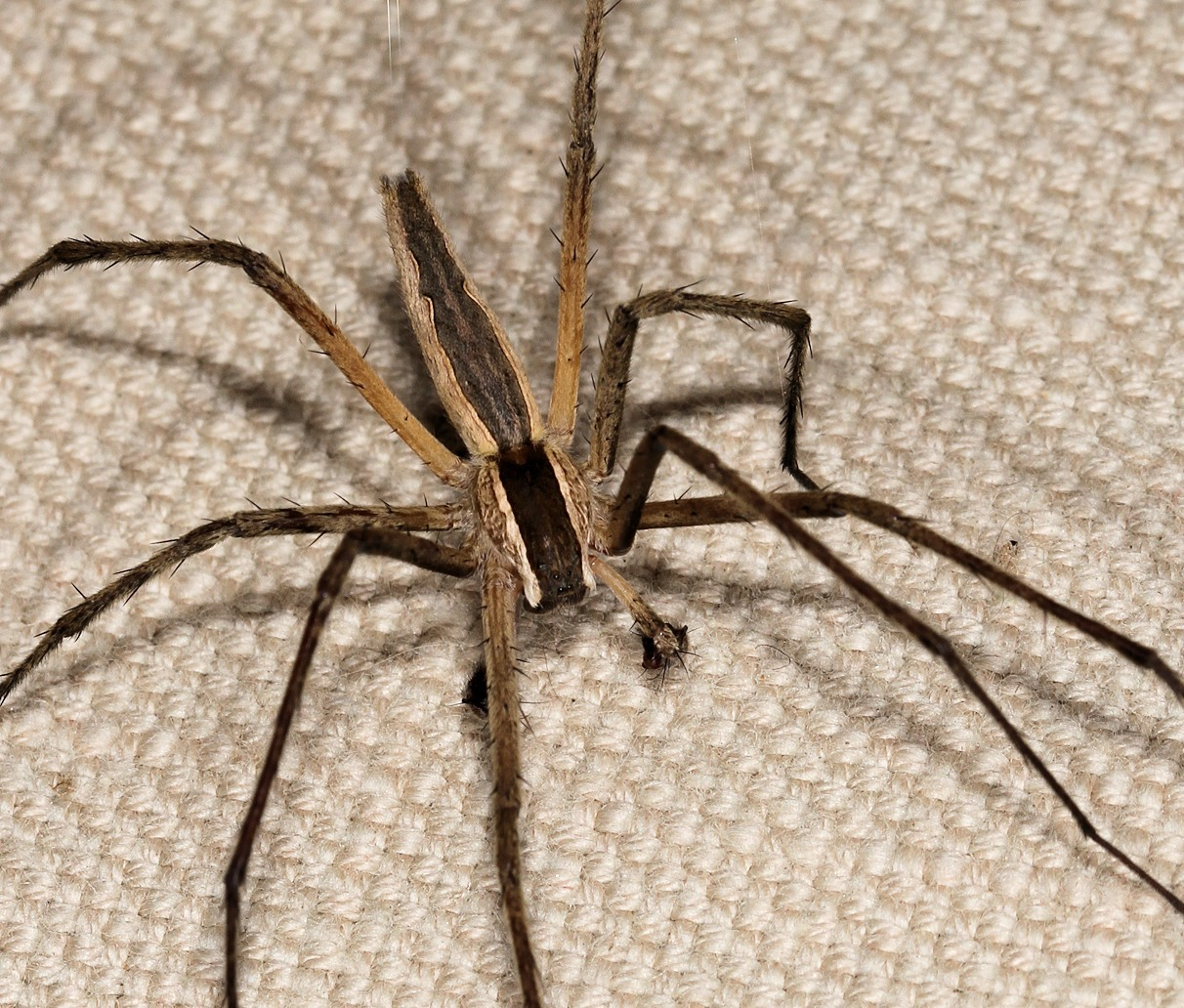
- male

Scientific classification
- Kingdom: Animalia
- Phylum: Arthropoda
- Subphylum: Chelicerata
- Class: Arachnida
- Order: Araneae
- Infraorder: Araneomorphae
- Family: Pisauridae
- Genus: Perenethis
- Species: P. simoni

Binomial name
- Perenethis simoni (Lessert, 1916)

Synonyms
- Tetragonophthalma phylla Simon, 1898; Tetragonophthalma simoni Lessert, 1916; Tetragonophthalma stuhlmanni Berland, 1922; Maypacius berlandi Roewer, 1955; Perenethis straeleni Roewer, 1955; Pisaurellus badius Blandin, 1976; Perenethis badicus Sierwald, 1997

= Perenethis simoni =

Simon's Perenethis nursery-web spider

Species of spider

Perenethis simoni is a spider species in the family Pisauridae. The species is commonly known as Simon's Perenethis nursery-web spider.

== Distribution ==
Perenethis simoni is widely distributed throughout Africa, including Tanzania, Mozambique, the Comoros, and South Africa. In South Africa, the species has been sampled from four provinces: Gauteng, KwaZulu-Natal, Limpopo, and Mpumalanga.

== Habitat and ecology ==
The species constructs sheet-webs in vegetation.

It has been sampled from the Savanna biome at altitudes ranging from 47 to 1252 m. The species has also been recorded from citrus orchards.

== Conservation ==
Perenethis simoni is listed as Least Concern due to its wide geographical range. The species is protected in Ndumo Game Reserve, Tembe Elephant Park, uMkhuze Game Reserve, Makelali Game Reserve, and Kruger National Park. There are no significant threats to the species.

== Etymology ==
This species honors eminent French arachnologist Eugène Simon (1848-1924).

== Taxonomy ==
The species was originally described by Lessert in 1916 as Tetragonophthalma simoni from Tanzania. It was revised by Sierwald in 1997 and is known from both sexes.
