= Tapinothelops =

Scientific classification
- Kingdom: Animalia
- Phylum: Arthropoda
- Subphylum: Chelicerata
- Class: Arachnida
- Order: Araneae
- Infraorder: Araneomorphae
- Family: Pisauridae
- Genus: Tapinothelops; Roewer, 1955

Type species
- T. concolor (Caporiacco, 1947)

Species
- T. concolor (Caporiacco, 1947) – East Africa; T. vittipes (Caporiacco, 1941) – Ethiopia

Genus of spiders

Tapinothelops is a genus of African nursery web spiders that was first described by Carl Friedrich Roewer in 1955. As of June 2019, it contains only two species, found only in Africa: T. concolor and T. vittipes.
