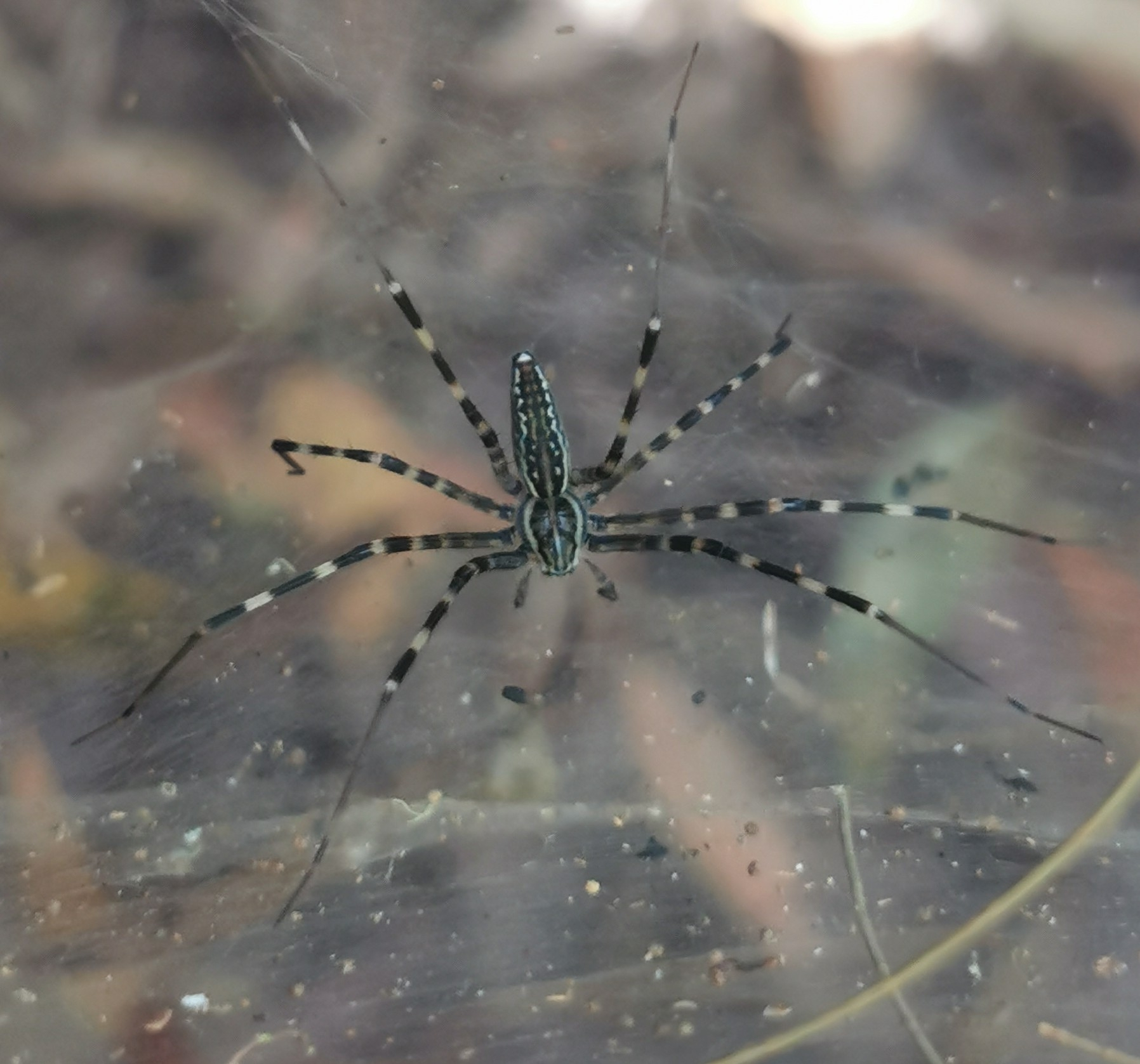

Scientific classification
- Kingdom: Animalia
- Phylum: Arthropoda
- Subphylum: Chelicerata
- Class: Arachnida
- Order: Araneae
- Infraorder: Araneomorphae
- Family: Pisauridae
- Genus: Inola; Davies, 1982

Type species
- I. amicabilis Davies, 1982

Species
- 4, see text

= Inola =

Genus of spiders

Inola is a genus of Australian nursery web spiders that was first described by V. T. Davies in 1982.

== Species ==
As of June 2019 it contains four species, found only in Queensland:

- Inola amicabilis Davies, 1982 (type) – Australia (Queensland)
- Inola cracentis Davies, 1982 – Australia (Queensland)
- Inola daviesae Tio & Humphrey, 2010 – Australia (Queensland)
- Inola subtilis Davies, 1982 – Australia (Queensland)
