= Phalaeops =

Scientific classification
- Kingdom: Animalia
- Phylum: Arthropoda
- Subphylum: Chelicerata
- Class: Arachnida
- Order: Araneae
- Infraorder: Araneomorphae
- Family: Pisauridae
- Genus: Phalaeops; Roewer, 1955

Type species
- P. mossambicus Roewer, 1955

Species
- P. mossambicus Roewer, 1955 – Mozambique; P. somalicus Roewer, 1955 – Djibouti

Genus of spiders

Phalaeops is a genus of East African nursery web spiders that was first described by Carl Friedrich Roewer in 1955. As of June 2019 it contains only two species, found only in Djibouti and Mozambique: P. mossambicus and P. somalicus.
