= Sphedanus =

Scientific classification
- Kingdom: Animalia
- Phylum: Arthropoda
- Subphylum: Chelicerata
- Class: Arachnida
- Order: Araneae
- Infraorder: Araneomorphae
- Family: Pisauridae
- Genus: Sphedanus; Thorell, 1877

Type species
- S. undatus Thorell, 1877

Species
- S. banna (Zhang, Zhu & Song, 2004) – China, Laos; S. quadrimaculatus (Thorell, 1897) – Singapore, Malaysia, Indonesia (Borneo); S. undatus Thorell, 1877 – Indonesia (Sulawesi)

Synonyms
- Eurychoera Thorell, 1897

Genus of spiders

Sphedanus is a genus of Asian nursery web spiders that was first described by Tamerlan Thorell in 1877. As of June 2019 it contains only three species, found only in Asia: S. banna, S. quadrimaculatus, and S. undatus.
