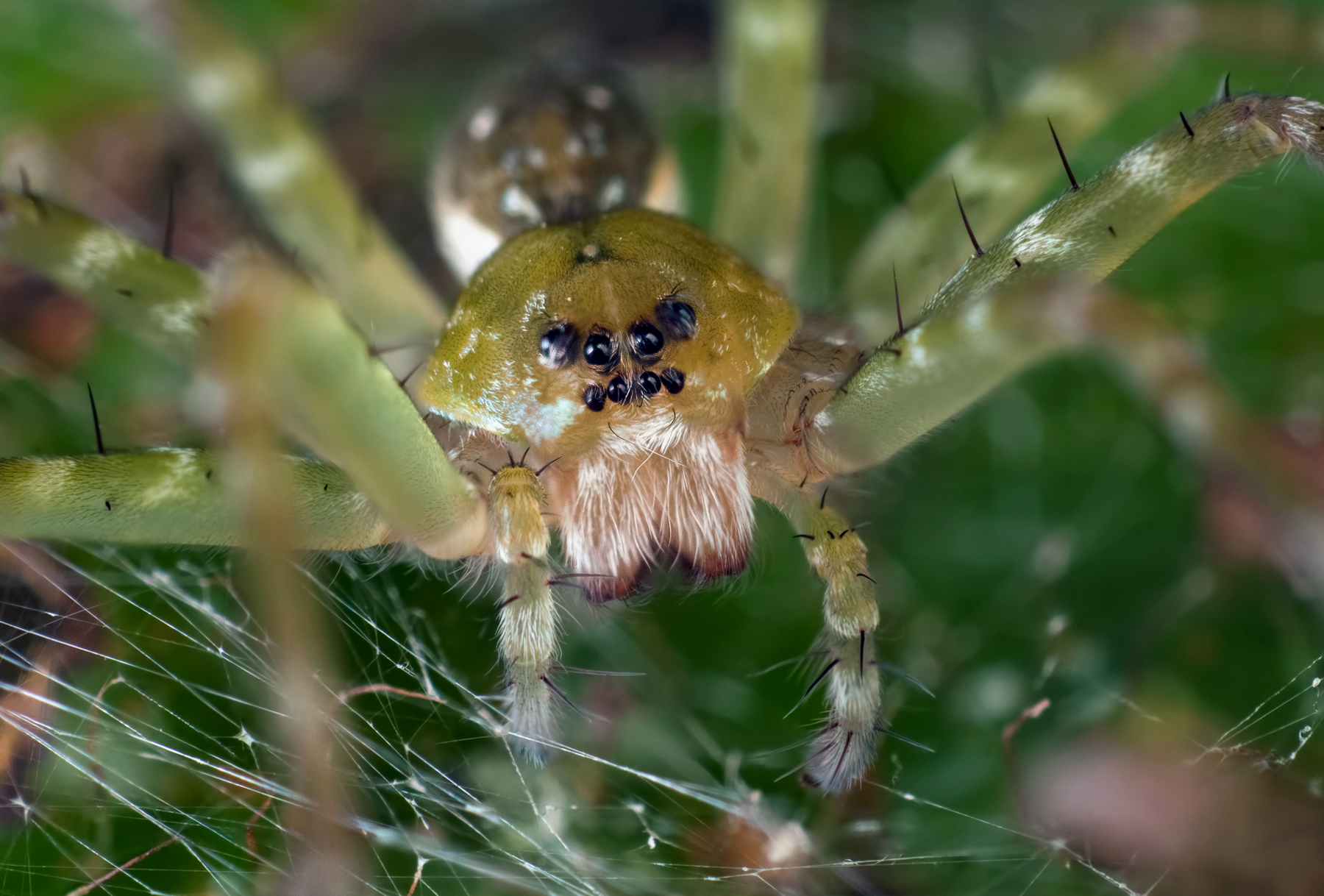
- Thaumasia sp. in Brazil
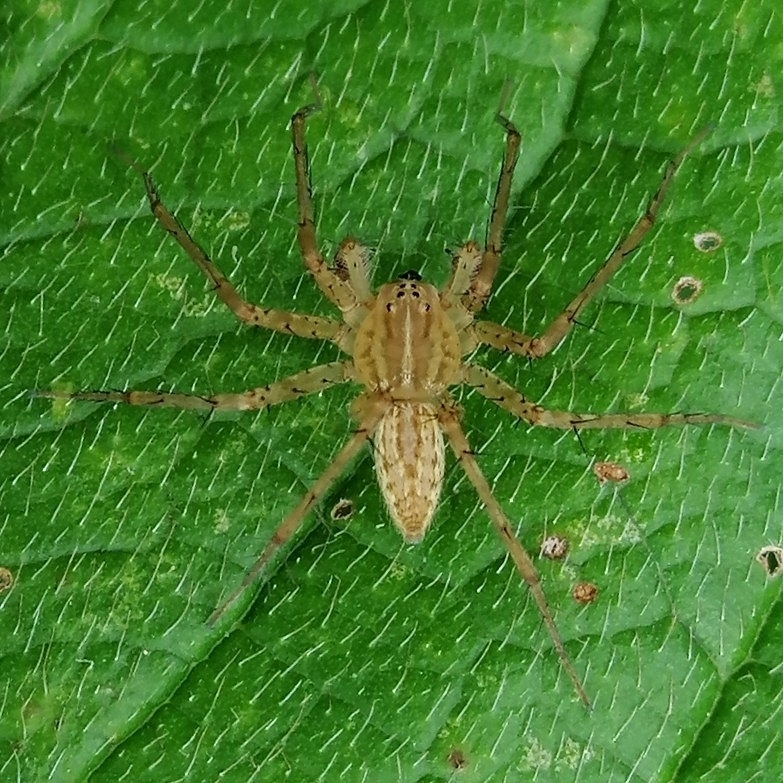
- T. argenteonotata in Guatemala

Scientific classification
- Kingdom: Animalia
- Phylum: Arthropoda
- Subphylum: Chelicerata
- Class: Arachnida
- Order: Araneae
- Infraorder: Araneomorphae
- Family: Pisauridae
- Genus: Thaumasia; Perty, 1833

Type species
- T. senilis Perty, 1833

Species
- 17, see text

= Thaumasia =

Genus of spiders

Thaumasia is a genus of nursery web spiders that was first described by Josef Anton Maximilian Perty in 1833.

== Species ==
As of June 2019 it contains seventeen species, found in South America, Costa Rica, Panama, Honduras, and Mexico:

- Thaumasia abrahami Mello-Leitão, 1948 – Honduras to Brazil
- Thaumasia acreana Silva & Carico, 2012 – Brazil
- Thaumasia annulipes F. O. Pickard-Cambridge, 1903 – Suriname, Peru, Brazil
- Thaumasia argenteonotata (Simon, 1898) – Mexico to Brazil
- Thaumasia caracarai Silva & Carico, 2012 – Mexico to Brazil
- Thaumasia caxiuana Silva & Carico, 2012 – Brazil
- Thaumasia diasi Silva & Carico, 2012 – Ecuador, Brazil
- Thaumasia heterogyna Chamberlin & Ivie, 1936 – Panama to Brazil
- Thaumasia hirsutochela Silva & Carico, 2012 – Costa Rica to Brazil
- Thaumasia lisei Silva & Carico, 2012 – Brazil
- Thaumasia onca Silva & Carico, 2012 – Colombia to Brazil
- Thaumasia oriximina Silva & Carico, 2012 – Brazil
- Thaumasia peruana Silva & Carico, 2012 – Peru
- Thaumasia scoparia (Simon, 1888) – Venezuela
- Thaumasia senilis Perty, 1833 (type) – Costa Rica to Paraguay
- Thaumasia velox Simon, 1898 – Panama to Argentina
- Thaumasia xingu Silva & Carico, 2012 – Colombia to Brazil
