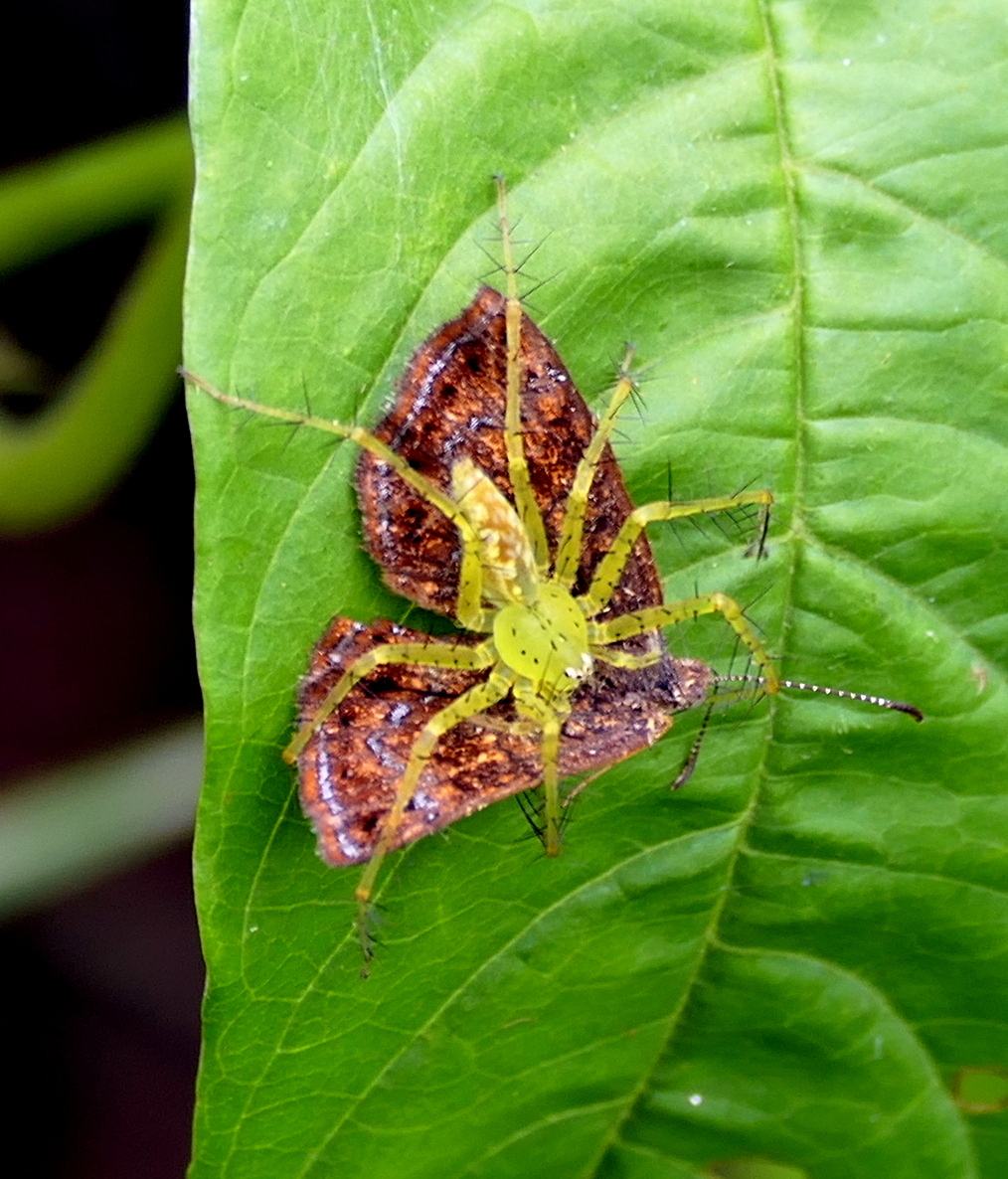
- A. spinipes with prey
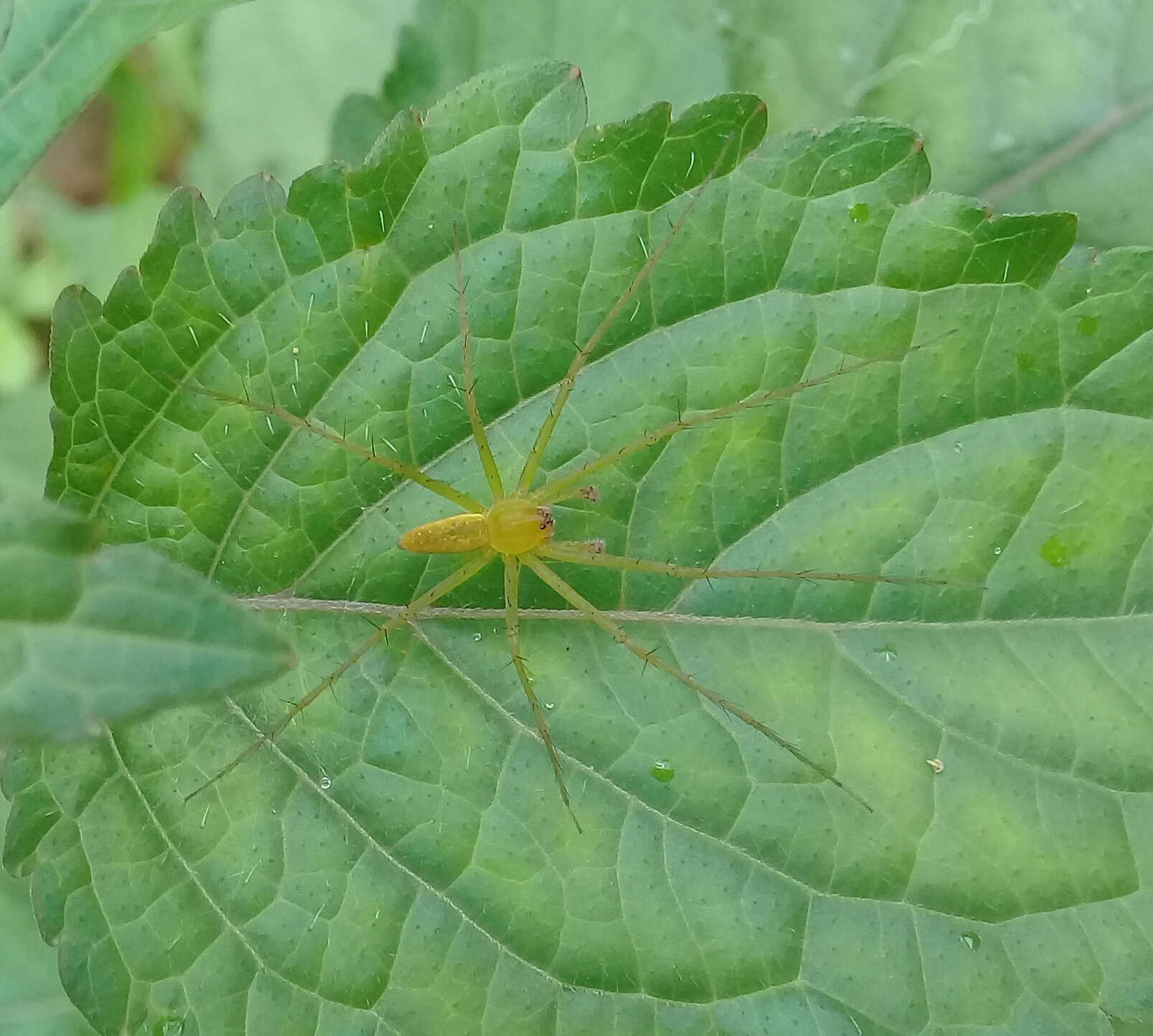
- Architis sp.

Scientific classification
- Kingdom: Animalia
- Phylum: Arthropoda
- Subphylum: Chelicerata
- Class: Arachnida
- Order: Araneae
- Infraorder: Araneomorphae
- Family: Pisauridae
- Genus: Architis; Simon, 1898

Type species
- A. tenuis Simon, 1898

Species
- 21, see text

Synonyms
- Mimicosa Petrunkevitch, 1925; Sisenna Simon, 1898; Staberius Simon, 1898

= Architis =

Genus of spiders

Architis is a genus of nursery web spiders that was first described by Eugène Louis Simon in 1898.

== Distribution ==
Spiders in this genus are found in South America, Panama, and on Trinidad.

== Species ==
As of October 2025, this genus includes 21 species:

- Architis altamira Santos, 2007 – Brazil
- Architis amazonica (Simon, 1898) – Brazil
- Architis brasiliensis (Mello-Leitão, 1940) – Brazil
- Architis capricorna Carico, 1981 – Brazil, Argentina
- Architis catuaba Santos, 2008 – Brazil, Peru
- Architis colombo Santos, 2007 – Brazil
- Architis comaina Santos, 2007 – Peru
- Architis cymatilis Carico, 1981 – Trinidad, Colombia to Brazil
- Architis dianasilvae Santos, 2007 – Peru
- Architis erwini Santos, 2007 – Ecuador
- Architis fritzmuelleri Santos, 2007 – Brazil
- Architis gracilis Santos, 2008 – Brazil
- Architis helveola (Simon, 1898) – Colombia, Ecuador, Brazil
- Architis ikuruwa Carico, 1981 – Guyana, Suriname, Peru, Bolivia
- Architis maturaca Santos, 2007 – Brazil
- Architis neblina Santos & Nogueira, 2008 – Brazil
- Architis robusta Carico, 1981 – Panama, Brazil
- Architis spinipes (Taczanowski, 1874) – Panama, Trinidad to Argentina
- Architis tenuipes (Simon, 1898) – Brazil
- Architis tenuis Simon, 1898 – Panama to Brazil (type species)
- Architis turvo Santos, 2007 – Brazil
