= Stoliczka =

Scientific classification
- Kingdom: Animalia
- Phylum: Arthropoda
- Subphylum: Chelicerata
- Class: Arachnida
- Order: Araneae
- Infraorder: Araneomorphae
- Family: Pisauridae
- Genus: Stoliczka; O. Pickard-Cambridge, 1885

Type species
- S. insignis O. Pickard-Cambridge, 1885

Species
- S. affinis Caporiacco, 1935 – Pakistan; S. insignis O. Pickard-Cambridge, 1885 – Pakistan

Genus of spiders

Stoliczka is a genus of Pakistani nursery web spiders that was first described by Octavius Pickard-Cambridge in 1885. As of June 2019 it contains only two species, found only in Pakistan: S. affinis and S. insignis.
