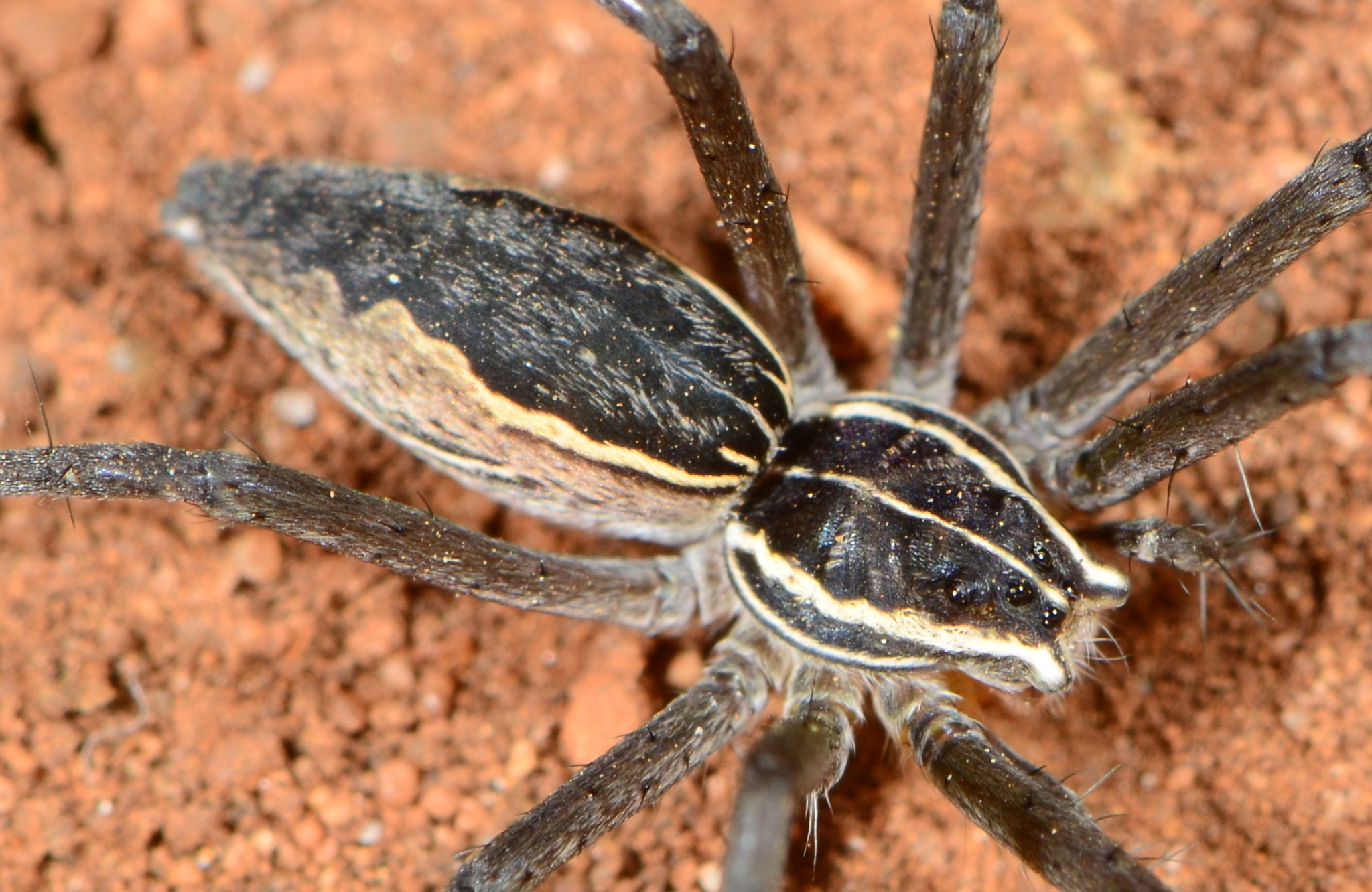
- female E. vuattouxi
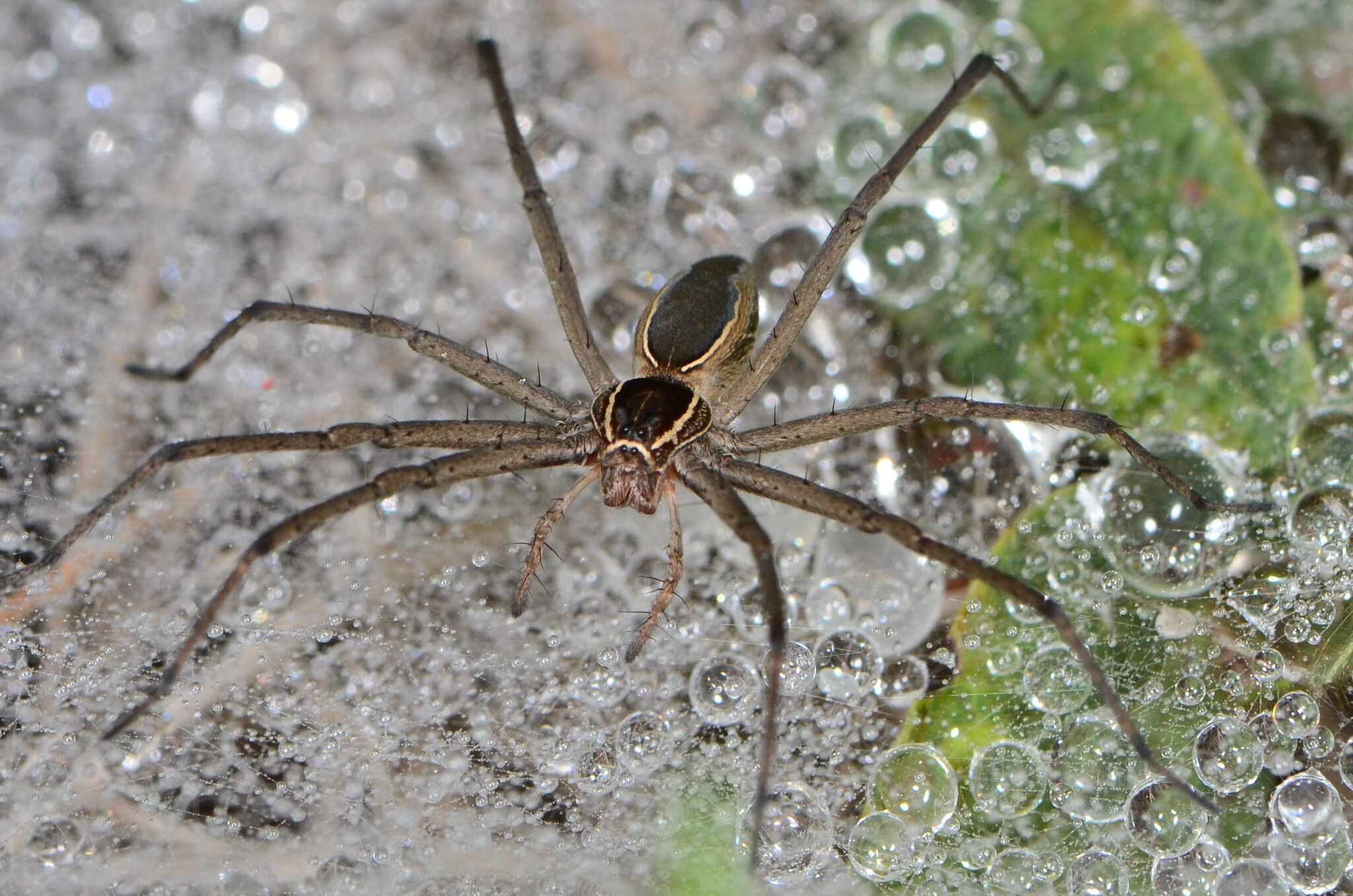
- female E. pulchella

Scientific classification
- Kingdom: Animalia
- Phylum: Arthropoda
- Subphylum: Chelicerata
- Class: Arachnida
- Order: Araneae
- Infraorder: Araneomorphae
- Family: Pisauridae
- Genus: Euprosthenopsis; Blandin, 1974

Type species
- E. armata (Strand, 1913)

Species
- 7, see text

= Euprosthenopsis =

Genus of spiders

Euprosthenopsis is a genus of African nursery web spiders that was first described by P. Blandin in 1974.

== Description ==
Euprosthenopsis species have a carapace as wide as long. The anterior lateral eyes are pedunculate, as in Euprosthenops, with the peduncles generally somewhat more detached from the cephalothorax. The base of the median eyes forms a trapezium proportionally larger than in Euprosthenops. The posterior margin of the chelicerae has three teeth.

The cephalothorax has characteristic pilosity forming an ornamentation: two thin white and more or less undulating lateral bands extend onto the median part of the peduncles of the anterior lateral eyes, the sides of which are brown, and a thin white median band penetrates the eye group and is connected by white stripes to the lateral bands.

The abdomen is oval and tapers towards the back. The legs are relatively long, sometimes slightly laterigrade, and have three claws.

== Taxonomy ==
The genus Euprosthenopsis was described by Blandin in 1974. It has been revised by Blandin (1974), with notes on some species by Silva and Sierwald (2014).

== Species ==
As of September 2025 it contains seven species and one subspecies, found only in Africa:

- Euprosthenopsis armata (Strand, 1913) (type) – Central, East Africa
- Euprosthenopsis lamorali Blandin, 1977 – South Africa
- Euprosthenopsis lesserti (Roewer, 1955) – East Africa
  - Euprosthenopsis l. garambensis (Lessert, 1928) – Central Africa
- Euprosthenopsis pulchella (Pocock, 1902) – South Africa, Lesotho, Eswatini
- Euprosthenopsis rothschildi Blandin, 1977 – Kenya
- Euprosthenopsis vachoni Blandin, 1977 – Djibouti
- Euprosthenopsis vuattouxi Blandin, 1977 – Ivory Coast, South Africa
