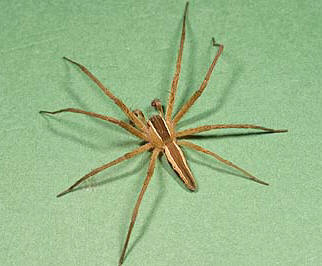
- male P. venusta
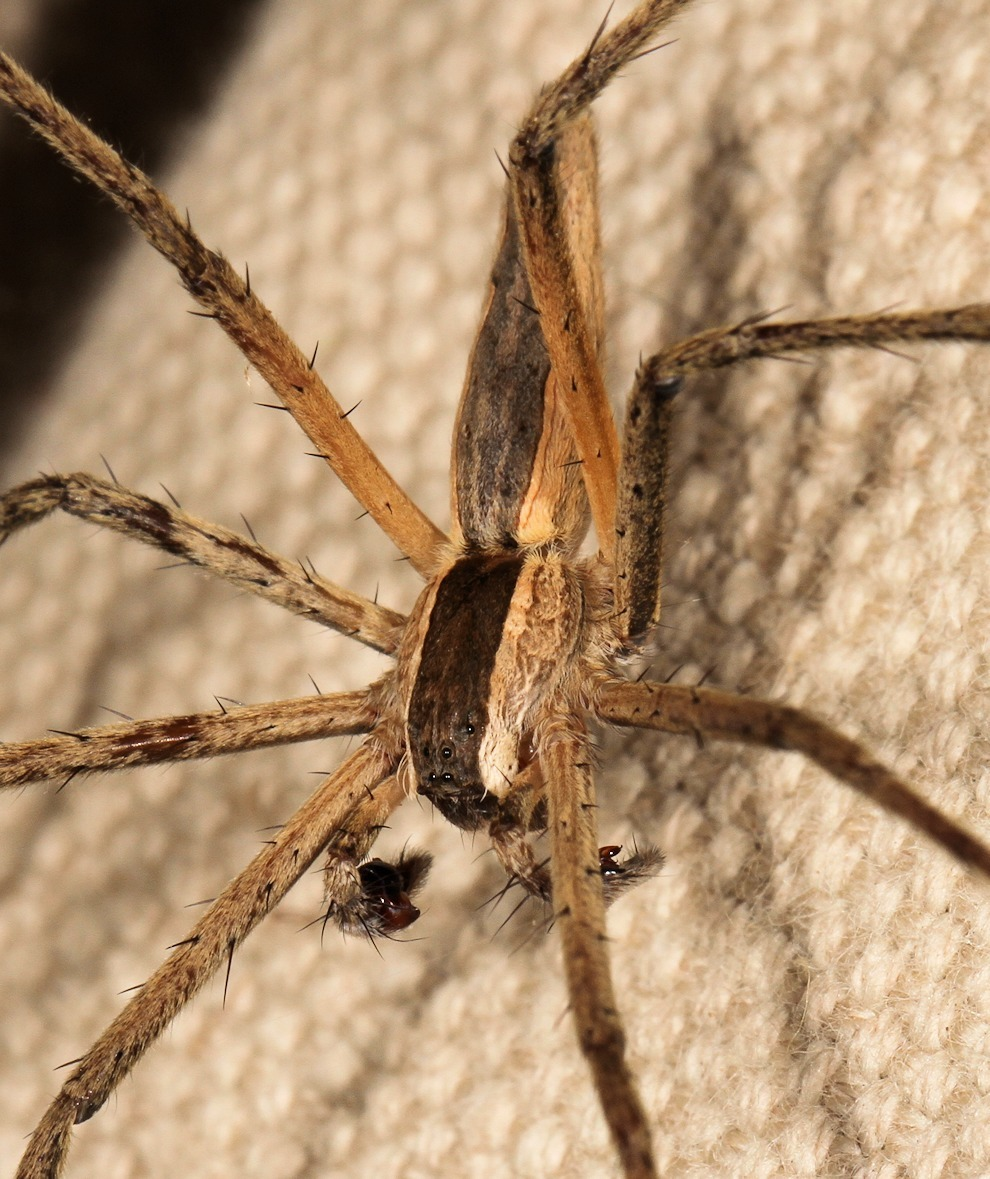
- P. simoni

Scientific classification
- Kingdom: Animalia
- Phylum: Arthropoda
- Subphylum: Chelicerata
- Class: Arachnida
- Order: Araneae
- Infraorder: Araneomorphae
- Family: Pisauridae
- Genus: Perenethis; L. Koch, 1878

Type species
- P. venusta L. Koch, 1878

Species
- 6, see text

= Perenethis =

Genus of spiders

Perenethis is a genus of nursery web spiders that was first described by Ludwig Carl Christian Koch in 1878.

== Distribution ==
Spiders in this genus are found in Asia and Africa, with P. venusta also found in Australia.

== Life style ==
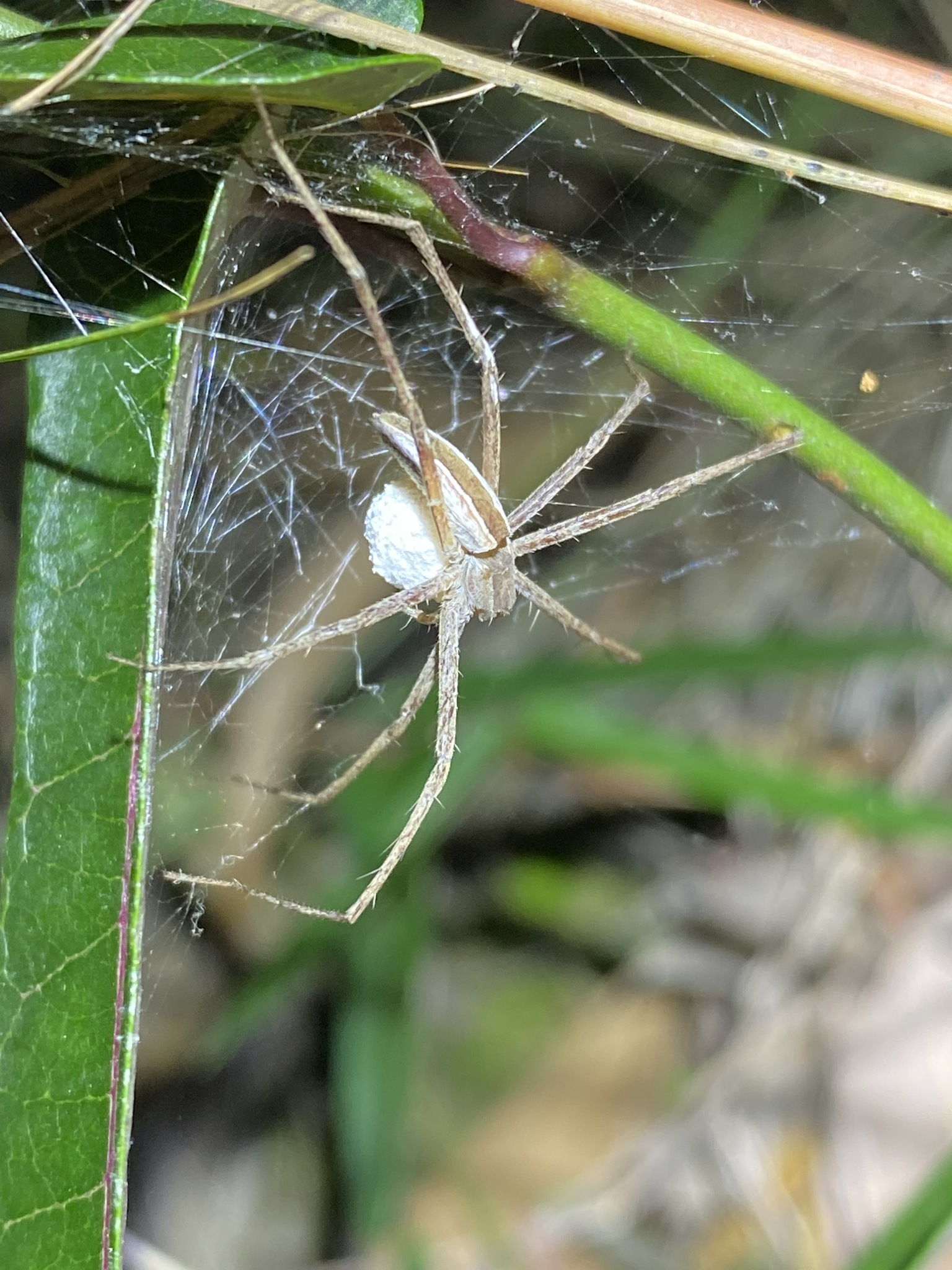
female P. venusta with egg sac

These are free-living plant dwellers found in savanna vegetation.

== Description ==
The colour pattern is median yellowish-brown, rarely reddish-brown, with a dorsal pattern featuring light lateral stripes along the prosoma and abdomen that enclose darker median sections. The ventral pattern shows greyish coloration of the legs. The carapace is very low, long, and almost flat in lateral view, with the eye region curving down to the chelicerae.The carapace is longer than wide, with eyes not on tubercles.

The anterior row is slightly procurved and the posterior eye row is recurved, with eyes rather small and subequal. The chelicerae have a posterior margin with two unequally-sized teeth close to the inner part. The abdomen is elongate and tapers to the posterior end, with indistinct brownish markings laterally towards the posterior apex.

The legs are of median length, with some specimens having thin, short pro- and retrolateral spines at the patella.

== Taxonomy ==
The genus was revised by Blandin in 1976 and Sierwald in 1997.

== Species ==
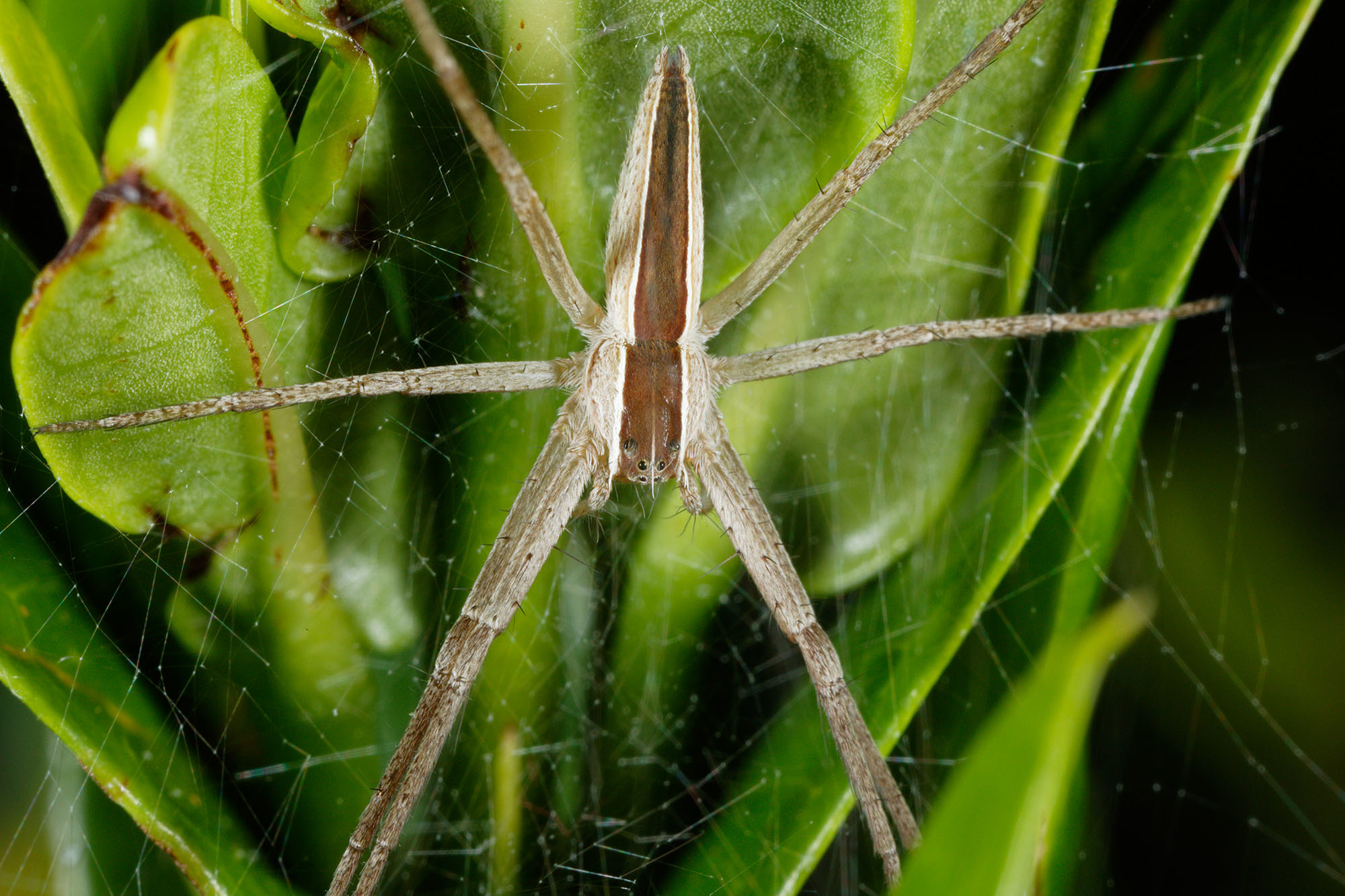
P. venusta

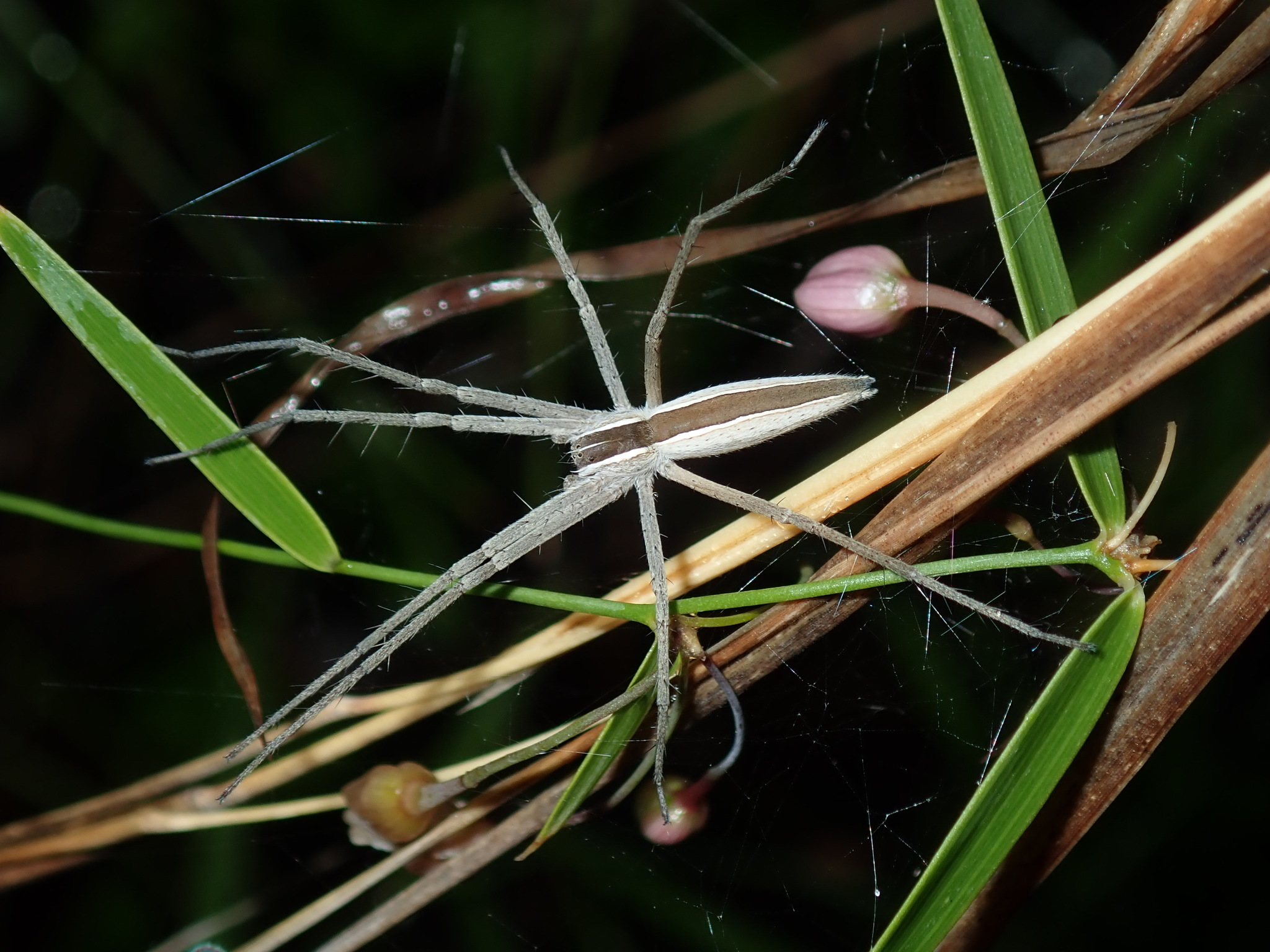
P. venusta

As of October 2025, this genus includes six species:

- Perenethis dentifasciata (O. Pickard-Cambridge, 1885) – Pakistan, India
- Perenethis fascigera (Bösenberg & Strand, 1906) – China, Korea, Japan
- Perenethis simoni (Lessert, 1916) – Africa, Comoros
- Perenethis sindica (Simon, 1897) – Pakistan, India, Sri Lanka, Nepal, China, Philippines
- Perenethis symmetrica (Lawrence, 1927) – Senegal, Djibouti, DR Congo, Kenya, Tanzania, Namibia, South Africa
- Perenethis venusta L. Koch, 1878 – India, Myanmar, Thailand, Singapore, Philippines, Japan, Papua New Guinea, Australia (Queensland, Western Australia) (type species)
