= Qianlingula =

Scientific classification
- Kingdom: Animalia
- Phylum: Arthropoda
- Subphylum: Chelicerata
- Class: Arachnida
- Order: Araneae
- Infraorder: Araneomorphae
- Family: Pisauridae
- Genus: Qianlingula; Zhang, Zhu & Song, 2004

Type species
- Q. bilamellata Zhang, Zhu & Song, 2004

Species
- Q. bilamellata Zhang, Zhu & Song, 2004 – China; Q. jiafu Zhang, Zhu & Song, 2004 – China; Q. turbinata Zhang, Zhu & Song, 2004 – China

Genus of spiders

Qianlingula is a genus of Chinese nursery web spiders that was first described by J. X. Zhang, M. S. Zhu & D. X. Song in 2004. As of June 2019 it contains only three species, found only in China: Q. bilamellata, Q. jiafu, and Q. turbinata.
