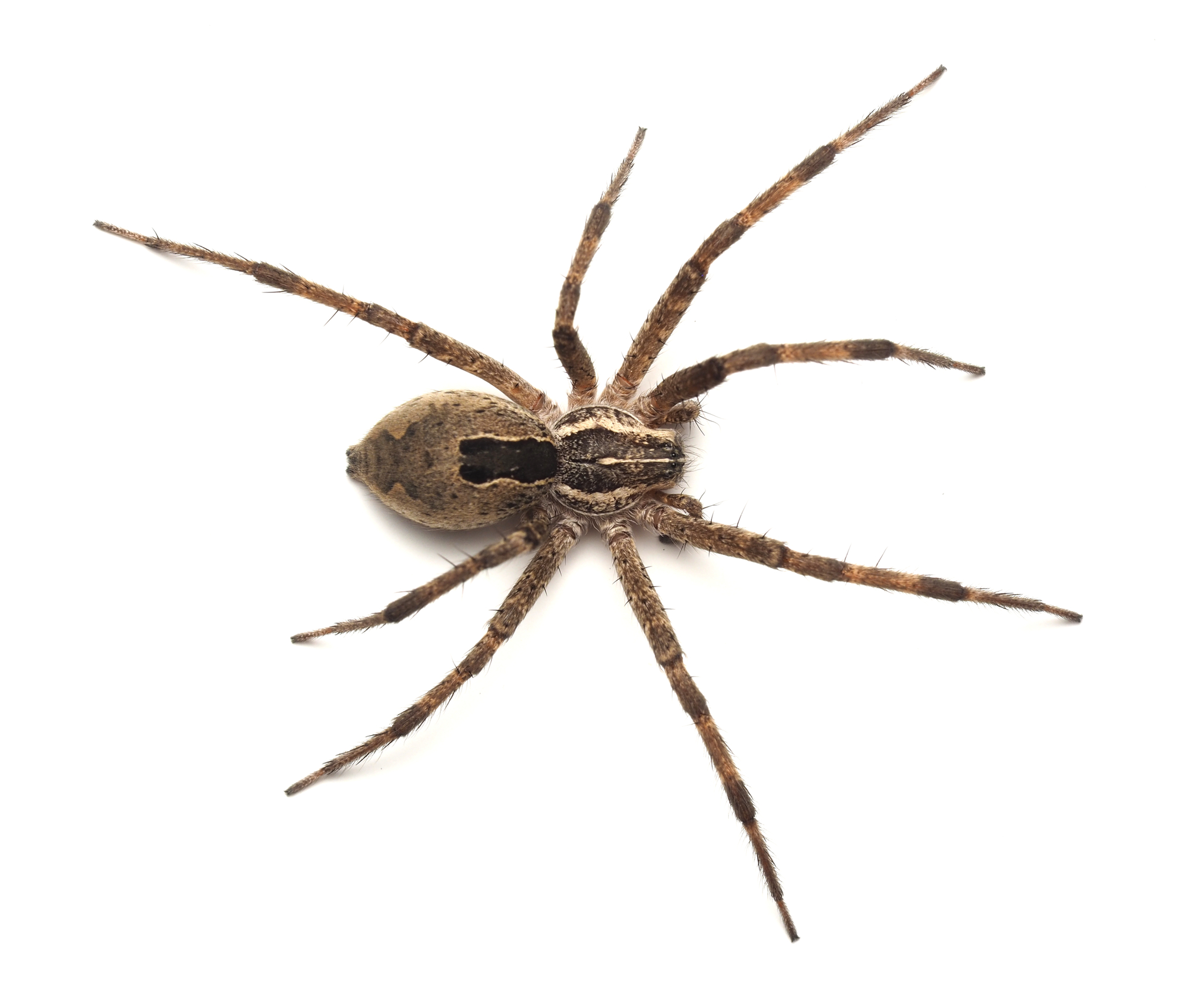
- D. icadia from Australia

Scientific classification
- Kingdom: Animalia
- Phylum: Arthropoda
- Subphylum: Chelicerata
- Class: Arachnida
- Order: Araneae
- Infraorder: Araneomorphae
- Family: Pisauridae
- Genus: Dendrolycosa; Doleschall, 1859

Type species
- D. fusca Doleschall, 1859

Species
- 17, see text

Synonyms
- Campostichommides Strand, 1911; Dianpisaura Zhang, Zhu & Song, 2004

= Dendrolycosa =

Genus of spiders

Dendrolycosa is a genus of nursery web spiders that was first described by Carl Ludwig Doleschall in 1859.

== Species ==
As of September 2025, the genus Dendrolycosa contains 18 species:

- Dendrolycosa bairdi Jäger, 2011 – Laos
- Dendrolycosa bobbiliensis (Reddy & Patel, 1993) – India
- Dendrolycosa cruciata (Roewer, 1955) – Tanzania
- Dendrolycosa duckitti Jäger, 2011 – Laos, Indonesia (Sumatra)
- Dendrolycosa fusca Doleschall, 1859 – Indonesia (Ambon)
- Dendrolycosa gitae (Tikader, 1970) – India (mainland, Andaman Islands)
- Dendrolycosa icadia (L. Koch, 1876) – Australia (Queensland)
- Dendrolycosa kakadu Raven & Hebron, 2018 – Australia (Northern Territory)
- Dendrolycosa lepida (Thorell, 1890) – Indonesia (Sumatra)
- Dendrolycosa ornata (Berland, 1924) – New Caledonia
- Dendrolycosa parangbusta (Barrion & Litsinger, 1995) – Philippines
- Dendrolycosa putiana (Barrion & Litsinger, 1995) – Philippines
- Dendrolycosa robusta (Thorell, 1895) – India, Myanmar, China, Laos, Vietnam
- Dendrolycosa rossi Silva & Griswold, 2013 – Madagascar
- Dendrolycosa sahyadriensis Sudhin, Sen & Jäger, 2023 – India
- Dendrolycosa sierwaldae Jäger, 2011 – New Guinea
- Dendrolycosa songi (Zhang, 2000) – China
- Dendrolycosa yuka Jäger, 2011 – South Africa
