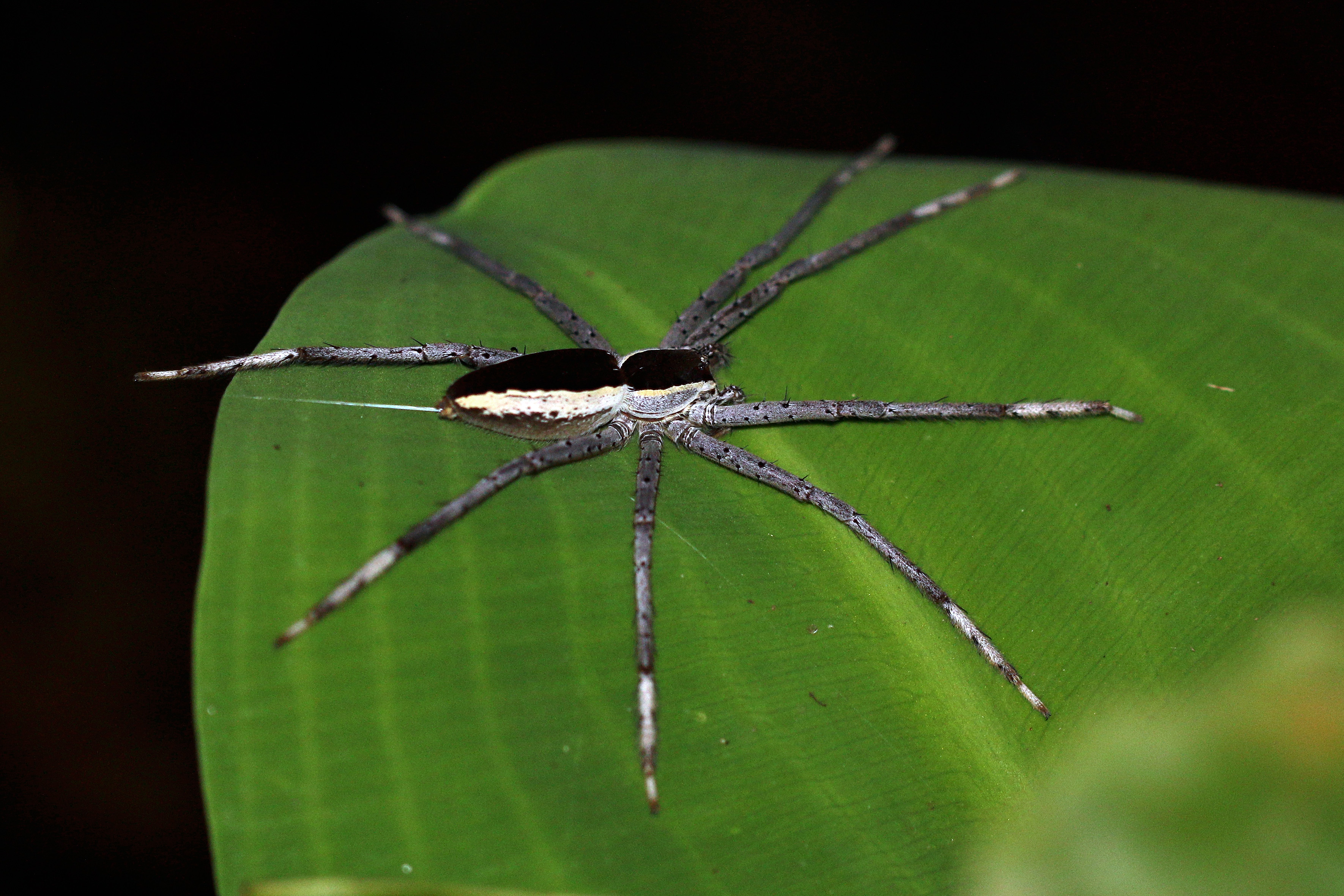
- Nilus albocinctus, female from Sabah, Borneo
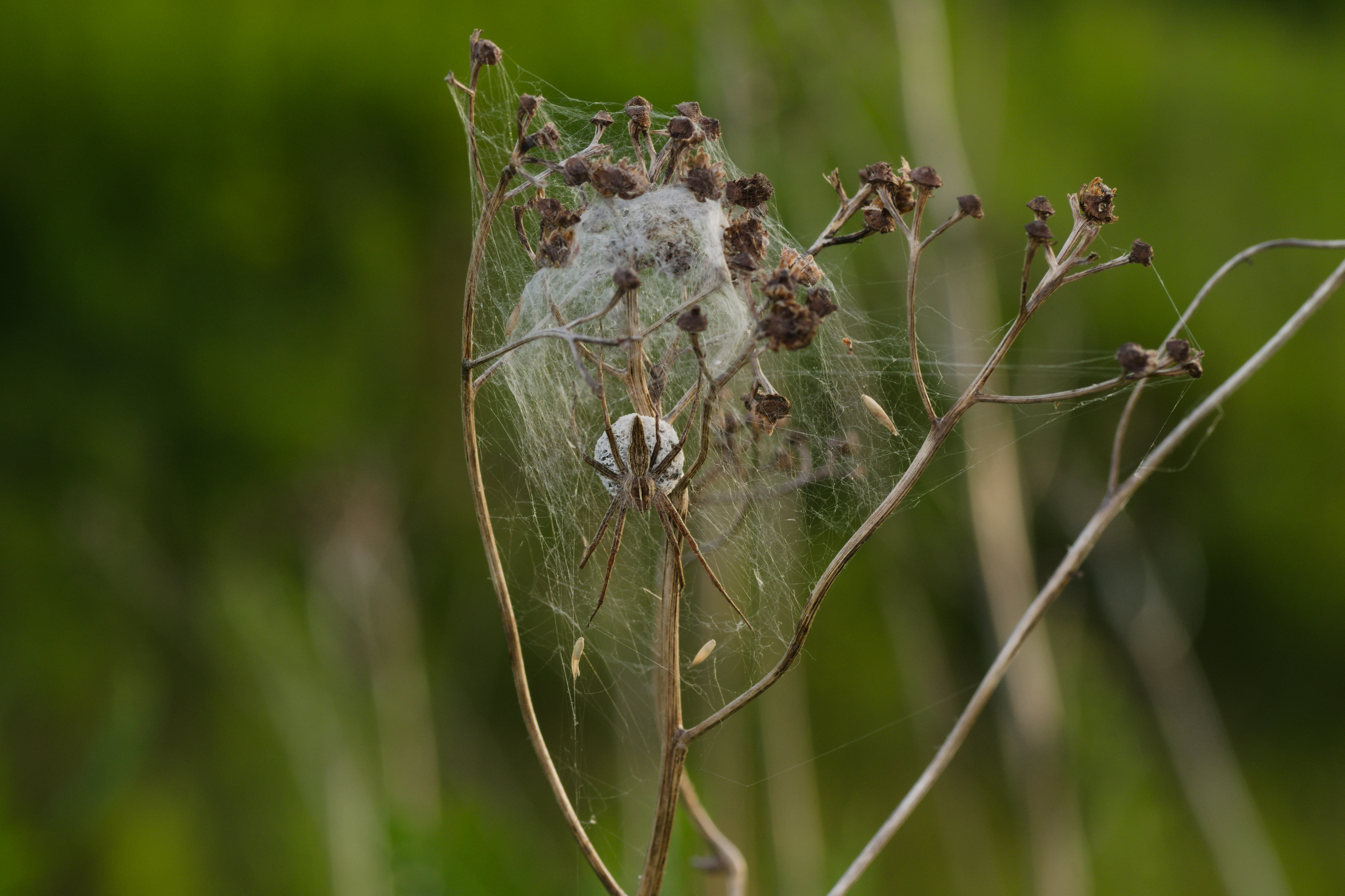
- Pisaura mirabilis female with its nursery of spiderlings

Scientific classification
- Kingdom: Animalia
- Phylum: Arthropoda
- Subphylum: Chelicerata
- Class: Arachnida
- Order: Araneae
- Infraorder: Araneomorphae
- Family: Pisauridae; Simon, 1890

Diversity
- 45 genera, 235 species
- blue: reported countries (WSC) green: observation hotspots (iNaturalist)

= Nursery web spider =

Nursery web spiders Temporal range: Palaeogene–present

Family of spiders

Nursery web spiders (Pisauridae) are a family of araneomorph spiders first described by Eugène Simon in 1890. Females of the family are known for building special nursery webs. When their eggs are about to hatch, a female spider builds a tent-like web, places her egg sac inside, and stands guard outside, hence the family's common name. Like wolf spiders, however, nursery web spiders are roaming hunters that do not use webs for catching prey.

The name "nursery web spider" is especially given to the European species Pisaura mirabilis. Adult female specimens may reach up to 15 mm in length, excluding legs. The legs of the male are longer in relation to body size than those of the female.

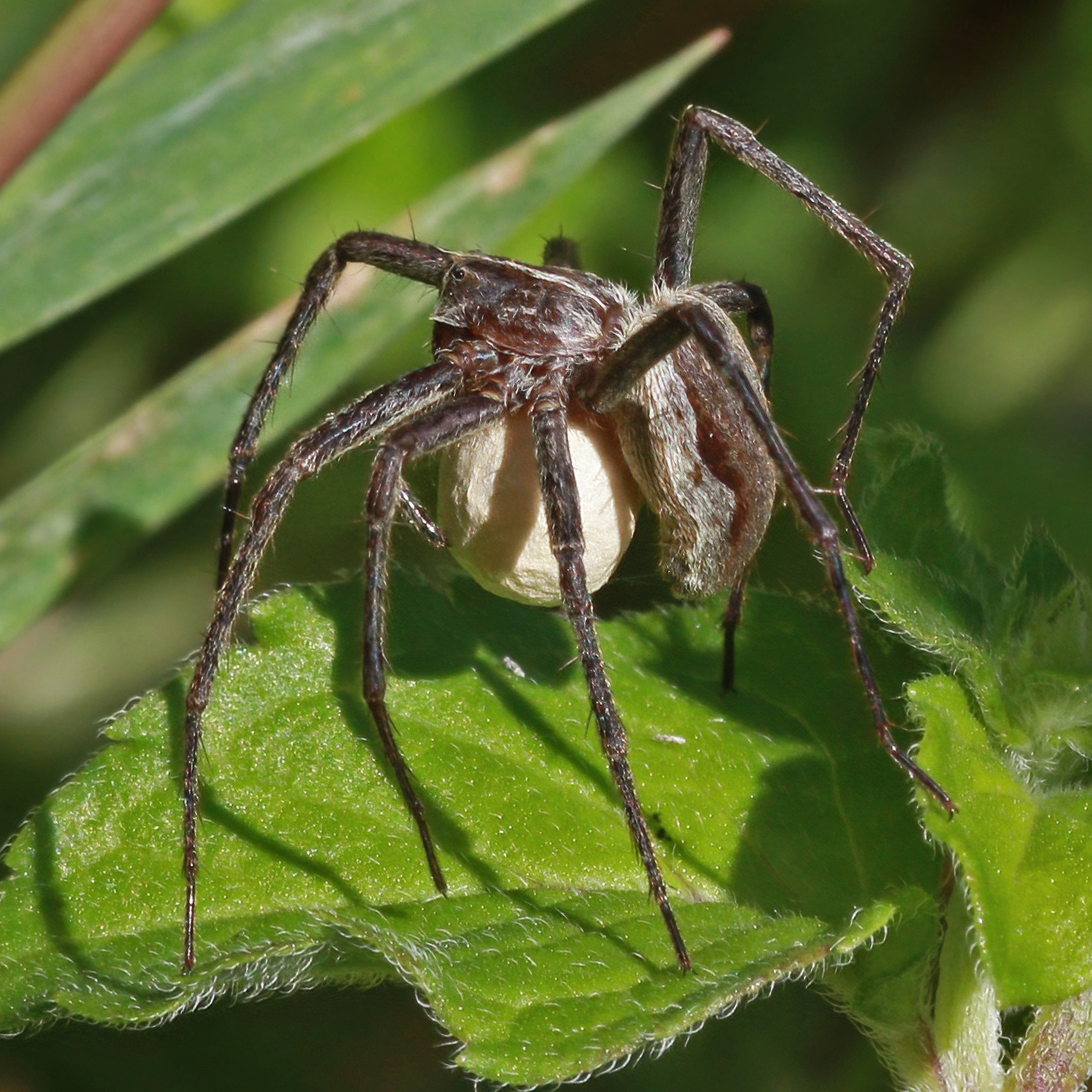
Nursery web spider carrying egg sac

== Distribution ==
Species occur throughout the world except for extremely dry or cold environments, and are common just about everywhere. Many can walk on the surface of still bodies of water and may even dive beneath the surface temporarily to escape enemies. They can jump a distance of 5 to 6 inches (130 to 150 mm), but they have trouble climbing extremely smooth surfaces such as glass.

== Behavior ==
The female spider sometimes attempts to eat the male after mating. The male, to reduce the risk of this, often presents the female with a gift such as a fly when approaching in the hope that this will satisfy her hunger. Sometimes, this gift is a fake present intended to fool the female. Males may wrap the fake gift in silk, to deceive the female to mate. Females can detect the fake gift and terminate mating, negating the male's deception in not giving a real gift.

== Description ==
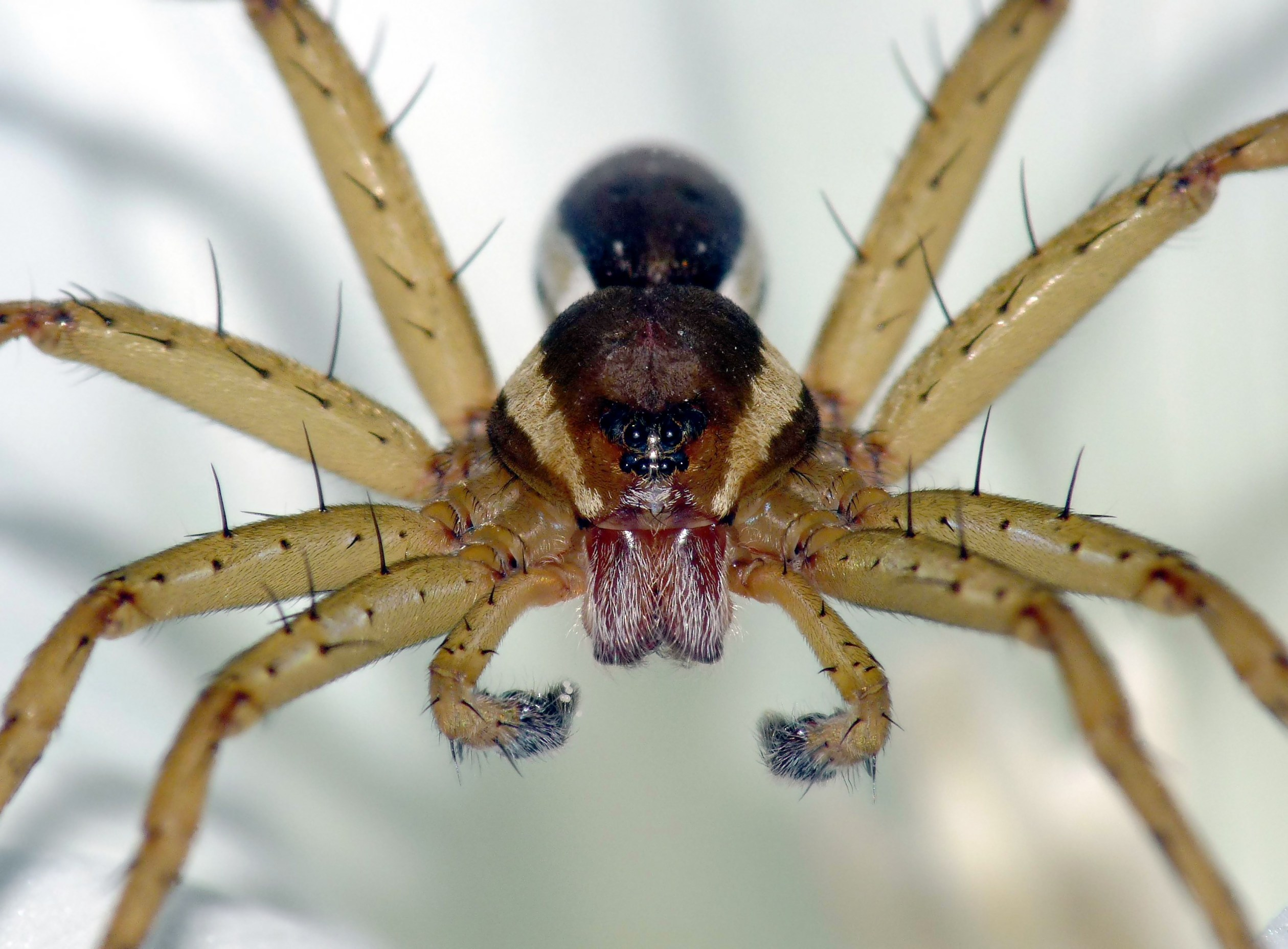
Dolomedes fimbriatus

Nursery web spiders resemble wolf spiders (Lycosidae) except for some key differences. The posterior lateral eyes of wolf spiders are relatively far back and point sideways. In nursery web spiders, the posterior lateral eyes are closer to the posterior median eyes. Also, female nursery web spiders carry their egg sacs with their chelicerae instead of attaching them to their spinnerets as wolf spiders do.

== Genera ==
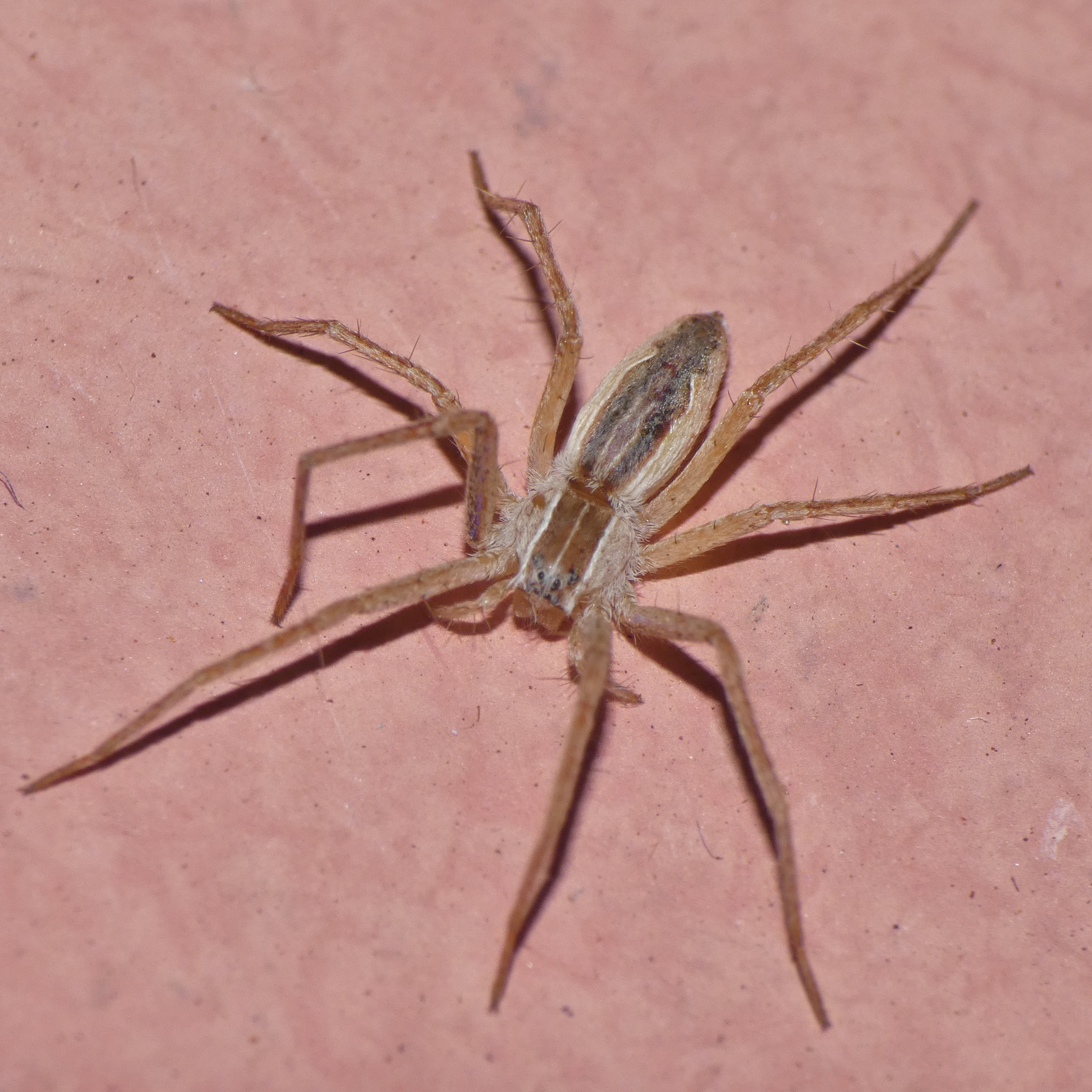
Afropisaura ducis

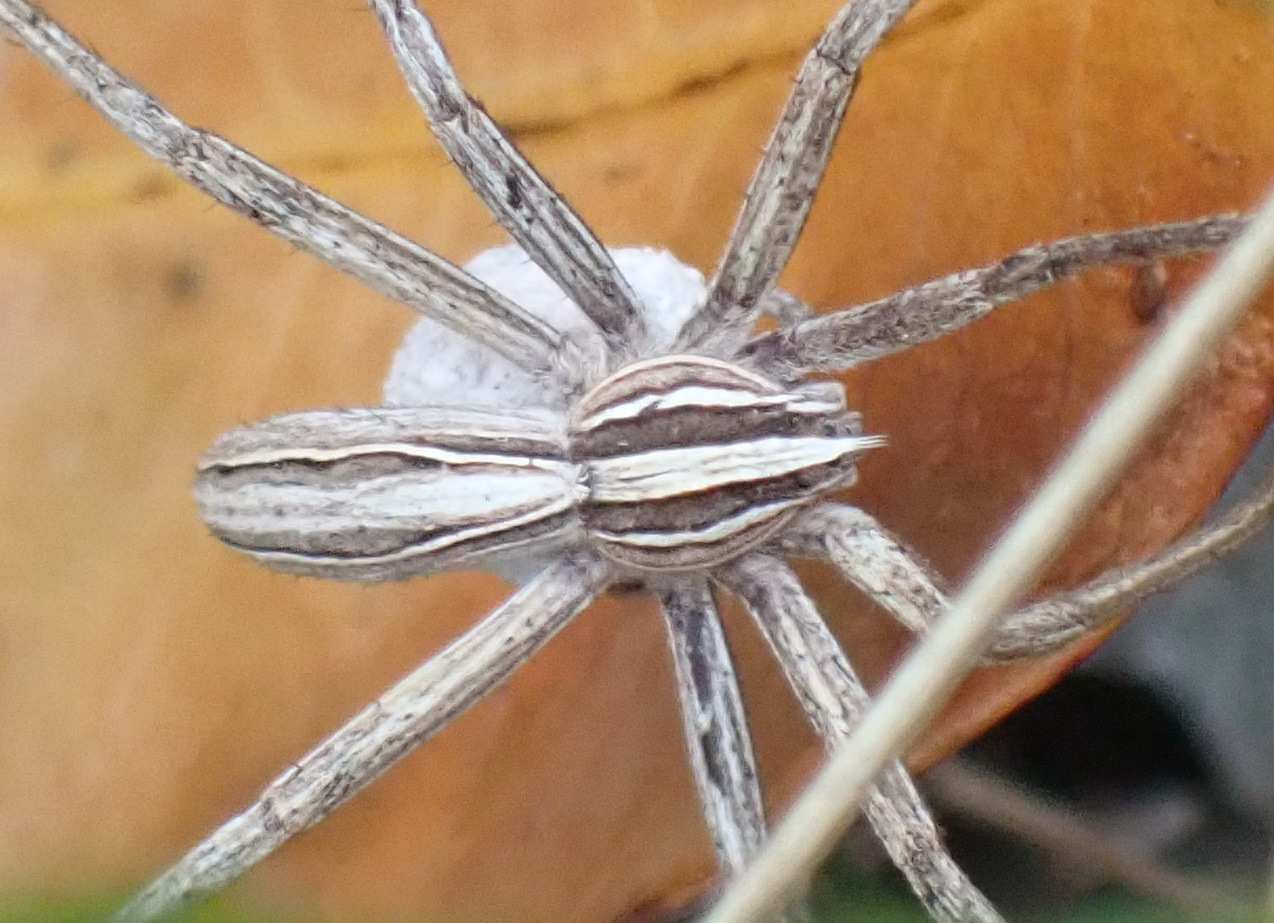
Chiasmopes namaquensis

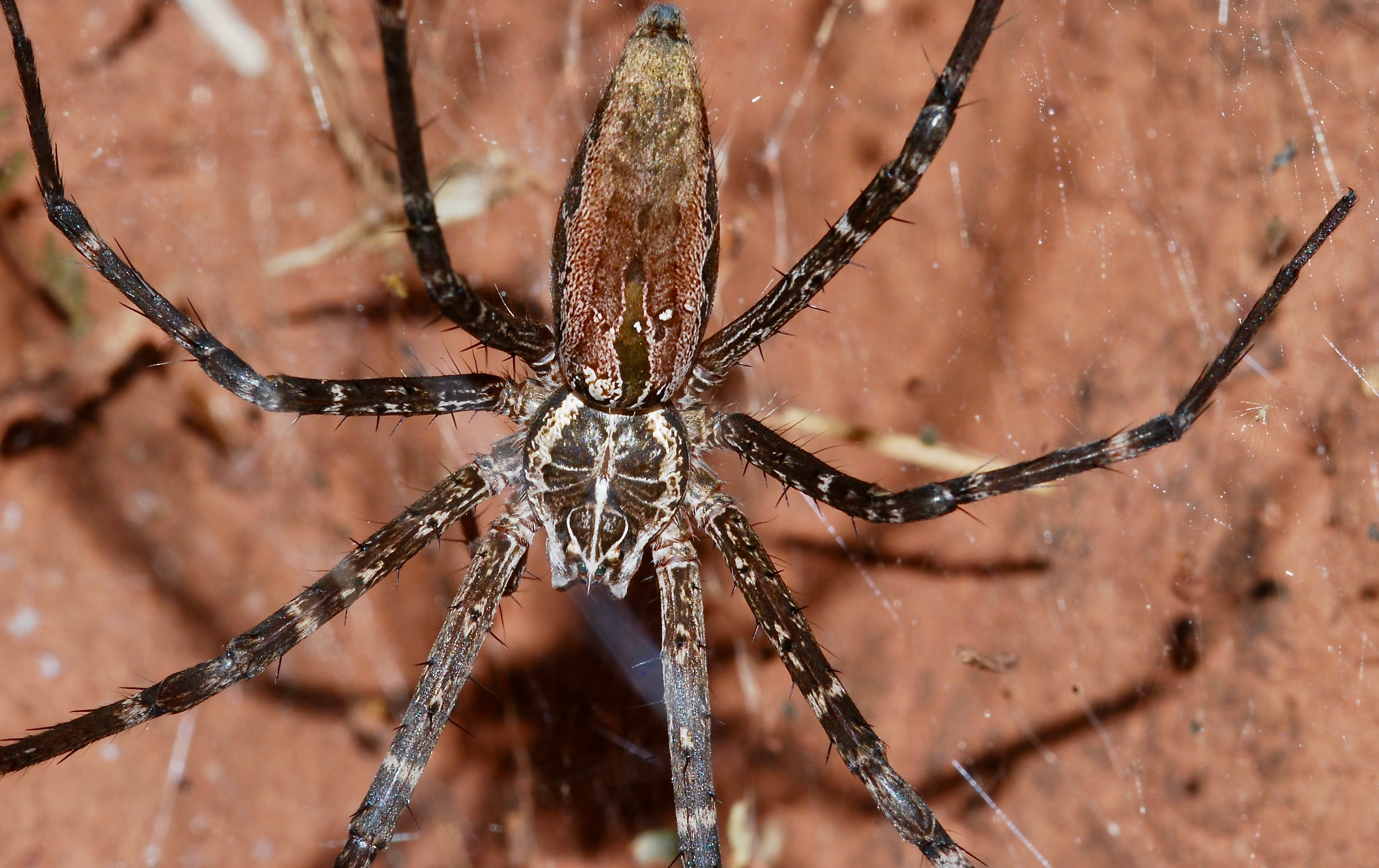
Euprosthenops bayaonianus

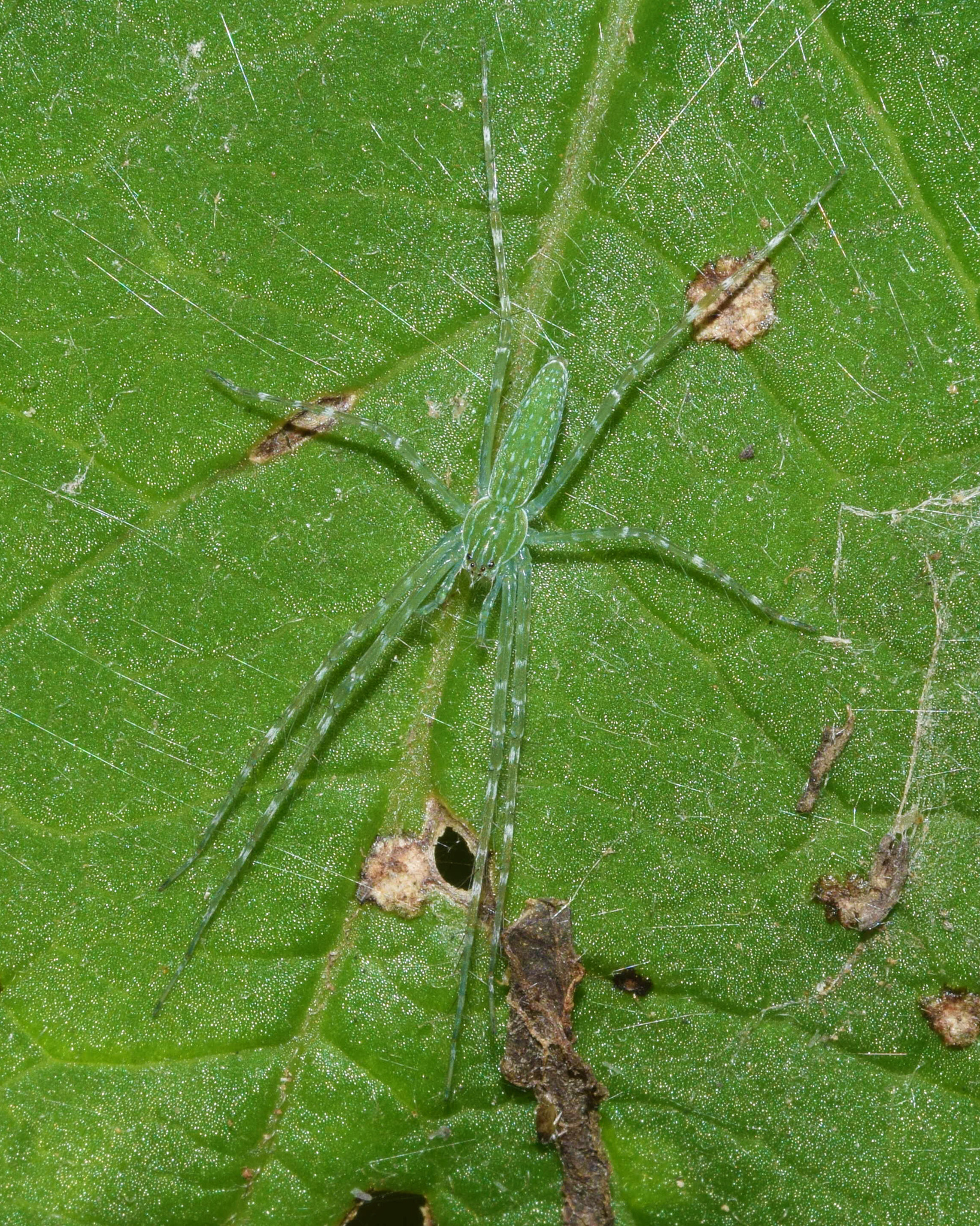
Hygropoda tangana

As of January 2026, this family includes 45 genera and 235 species:

- Afropisaura Blandin, 1976 – Africa
- Archipirata Simon, 1898 – Turkmenistan, China
- Architis Simon, 1898 – South America, Trinidad, Panama
- Blandinia Tonini, Silva, Filho & Freitas, 2016 – Madagascar
- Caripetella Strand, 1928 – Madagascar, Comoros
- Charminus Thorell, 1899 – Africa
- Chiasmopes Pavesi, 1883 – Ethiopia, Namibia, South Africa
- Cispinilus Roewer, 1955 – Central Africa
- Cispius Simon, 1898 – South Africa, Congo
- Cladycnis Simon, 1898 – Canary Islands
- Conakrya Schmidt, 1956 – Guinea
- Dendrolycosa Doleschall, 1859 – Asia, Africa, Oceania
- Eucamptopus Pocock, 1900 – India
- Euprosthenops Pocock, 1897 – Africa, India
- Euprosthenopsis Blandin, 1974 – Africa
- Hala Jocqué, 1994 – Madagascar
- Hygropoda Thorell, 1895 – Africa, Asia, Australia
- Ilipula Simon, 1903 – Vietnam
- Inola Davies, 1982 – Australia
- Maypacius Simon, 1898 – Africa
- Nilus O. Pickard-Cambridge, 1876 – Asia, Africa
- Papakula Strand, 1911 – Indonesia
- Paracladycnis Blandin, 1979 – Madagascar
- Perenethis L. Koch, 1878 – Asia, Comoros, Oceania
- Phalaeops Roewer, 1955 – Mozambique, Djibouti
- Pisaura Simon, 1886 – Asia
- Pisaurina Simon, 1898 – United States, Canada, Cuba
- Polyboea Thorell, 1895 – Asia
- Qianlingula Zhang, Zhu & Song, 2004 – China
- Rothus Simon, 1898 – Israel, South Africa
- Sphedanus Thorell, 1877 – Singapore, Malaysia, Indonesia
- Stoliczka O. Pickard-Cambridge, 1885 – Pakistan
- Tallonia Simon, 1889 – Madagascar
- Tapinothele Simon, 1898 – Tanzania
- Tapinothelella Strand, 1909 – South Africa
- Tapinothelops Roewer, 1955 – Ethiopia
- Tetragonophthalma Karsch, 1878 – West, Central Africa
- Thalassiopsis Roewer, 1955 – Madagascar
- Thaumasia Perty, 1833 – Central America, South America, Mexico
- Tinus F. O. Pickard-Cambridge, 1901 – India, Cuba, North America, Central America
- Tolma Jocqué, 1994 – Madagascar
- Voraptipus Roewer, 1955 – Mozambique
- Voraptus Simon, 1898 – Africa, Indonesia, Seychelles
- Vuattouxia Blandin, 1979 – Côte d'Ivoire
- Walrencea Blandin, 1979 – South Africa

Some fossilized spiders have also been assigned to this family:

- †Eopisaurella Petrunkevitch, 1958 (Early Eocene; Baltic amber)
- †Palaeoperenethis Seldon & Penney, 2009 (Ypresian, British Columbia, Canada)
- †Esuritor Petrunkevitch, 1942 (Eocene; Baltic amber)
