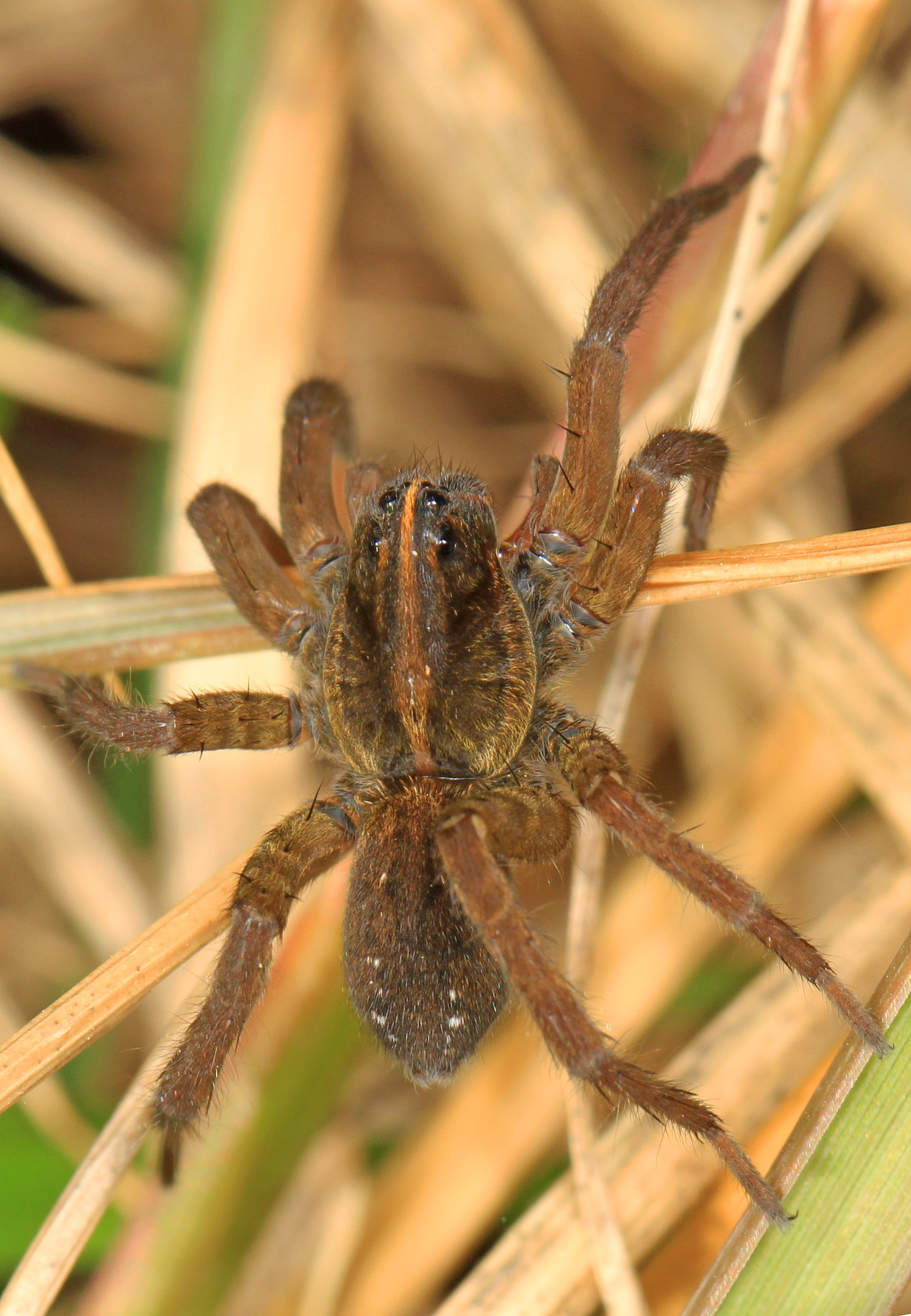
- Tigrosa helluo from Mason Neck, Virginia
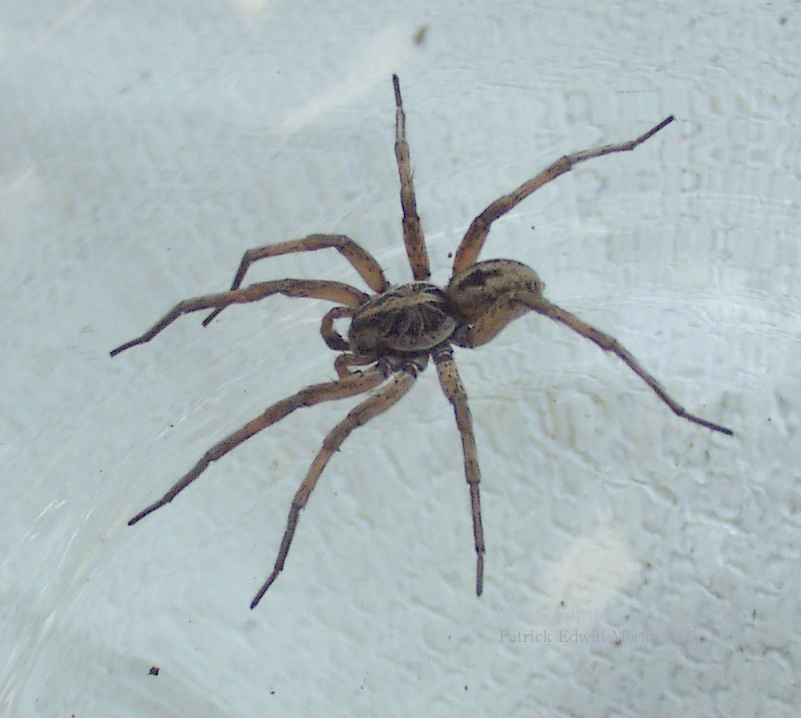
- Tigrosa helluo male from North Carolina

Scientific classification
- Kingdom: Animalia
- Phylum: Arthropoda
- Subphylum: Chelicerata
- Class: Arachnida
- Order: Araneae
- Infraorder: Araneomorphae
- Family: Lycosidae
- Genus: Tigrosa
- Species: T. helluo

Binomial name
- Tigrosa helluo (Walckenaer, 1837)

Synonyms
- Lycosa helluo Walckenaer, 1837; Lycosa sayi Walckenaer, 1837; Lycosa babingtoni Blackwall, 1846; Tarentula vafra C. L. Koch, 1847; Leimonia helluo (Walckenaer, 1837); Leimonia sayi (Walckenaer, 1837); Trochosa helvipes Keyserling, 1877; Lycosa nidicola Emerton, 1885; Lycosa crudelis Banks, 1892; Hogna helluo (Walckenaer, 1837)

= Tigrosa helluo =

Species of spider

Tigrosa helluo, commonly known as the Wetland Giant Wolf Spider, is a species of spider belonging to the family Lycosidae, also known as wolf spiders. T. helluo was formerly known as Hogna helluo before differences between dorsal color patterns, habitat preferences, body structures, etc. were discovered. The species is native to the United States, Canada, and Mexico. It can be found across the eastern half of the United States, primarily in the Northeast and New England, and as far west as Nebraska and Kansas. T. helluo can be found in diverse habitats including woods, marshes, fields, and riparian areas. Typically, members of this species prefer to live in wetter areas as opposed to dry environments. Males tend to live for around a year and females will live for close to two years.

The defining characteristic of T. helluo is its brown carapace and distinct yellow stripe starting from its anterior eyes extending down the cephalothorax. The underside of the abdomen has distinct black spots that distinguish T. helluo from other wolf spiders. At an average size of around 17 mm (0.67 in), T. helluo is one of the smaller wolf spiders. In addition, females tend to be larger than males in a display of sexual dimorphism.

Like other spiders of the family Lycosidae, wolf spiders are solitary and live and hunt alone. Unless in the process of mating, T. helluo will remain alone. It is usually active at night, during which it hunts for prey. In addition, T. helluo does not create webs, although females will make burrows under rocks or boards. Relying on their excellent eyesight and senses, T. helluo members are great hunters.

Members of T. helluo are not very aggressive and will not attack humans unless provoked. Their bites inject venom; however, it is not medically significant to humans, as only minor pain and swelling occur. Antivenom is rarely needed.

== Description ==
Whereas average body length for Tigrosa can range from 10 to 31 mm (0.39 to 1.22 in) for females and 11 to 24 mm (0.43 to 0.94 in) for males, T. helluo body length averages 17 mm (0.67 in). Compared to its close relative T. aspersa, T. helluo is much smaller. T. helluo is also often mistaken for Pisaurina mira, the nursery web spider, due to the physical resemblance. However, the carapace of T. helluo consists of a brownish color contrasting with a distinctive yellow stripe that extends from the anterior eyes to the cephalothorax. Starting from the posterior median eyes, a set of fainter yellow stripes extends posteriorly. In addition, the underside of the abdomen is marked with several black spots. Patterns found on the dorsal side of the cephalothorax and abdomen are similar to those found on T. georgicola; however, the faint yellow stripes appearing on T. helluo do not extend as far. Black spots found on the abdomen of T. helluo are also not found on T. georgicola. Coloration in the legs differs between sexes, with males' legs appearing yellow without distinct markings and females' legs appearing reddish brown without additional markings or bands.

== Taxonomy ==
The Tigrosa genus includes four species—T. annexa, T. aspersa, T. grandis, and T. helluo—that were moved from the genus Hogna. Tigrosa is defined by the distinct colored pattern on the dorsal cephalothorax, structure of the male palpus and epigynum, leg length, foraging behaviors, and eye arrangement. The aggressive nature and colorful patterns of these spiders related to the meaning of the word Tigrosa, which is "fierce like a tiger".

== Habitat and distribution ==
=== Habitat ===
In the United States, T. helluo can be found in a large variety of states in woods, marshes, and even grassy areas in northeastern states such as Connecticut. Females' nests are often found under stones or boards in fields and woods. These nests consist of burrows lined with silk. However, in states like Florida and Mississippi, T. helluo is most often found in wetter areas such as marshes and lakes.

=== Distribution ===
T. helluo can be found throughout the United States, Canada, and Mexico. It primarily resides along the East Coast in the New England region but can be found along the entire East Coast down to Florida. T. helluo resides in most states in the eastern half of the United States. It can be found as far west as Kansas and Nebraska.

== Reproduction and life cycle ==
Mating for T. helluo usually occurs in May or June. Males will live for just over one year while females will often live for around two years. Maturation occurs in males between May and September. Egg sacs are made in May and July and can range from 8 to 12 mm (0.31 to 0.47 in) in diameter. The eggs by themselves can appear tan or yellow and are around 1 to 2 mm (0.04 to 0.08 in) in diameter. Females will carry these eggs in an egg sac on their back until they hatch. Even after hatching, the female will continue to carry the hatchlings on her back until they mature enough to hunt by themselves. Female maturation can occur at any point during the year. Once mature, females will begin to overwinter during colder months. Males will typically die before it gets too cold.

As T. helluo matures, it will molt periodically. Time and duration of molting is dependent on nutritional intake and consequent growth potential. The frequency of molting is based on the nutritional reserves of an individual T. helluo. Individuals that feed more often will molt less frequently during maturation.

== Mating ==
=== Female–male dimorphism ===
T. helluo is sexually dimorphic. In this species, the two sexes dramatically differ in size, with mature females being larger than males. Typically, females will grow to weigh more than 300 mg (0.01 oz) with carapace widths of around 6.5 mm (0.26 in), while males will usually only weigh in excess of 200 mg (0.007 oz) and have carapace widths of around 4.5 mm (0.18 in).

=== Sexual cannibalism ===
Like many other wolf spiders, T. helluo will engage in precopulatory and postcopulatory sexual cannibalism. The frequency at which females participate in sexual cannibalism depends on a variety of factors. The degree of sexual dimorphism between two spiders has been shown to have an effect on the occurrence of sexual cannibalism. Males who are smaller are more vulnerable to larger females and therefore are more likely to be cannibalized. The larger the size difference between the male and female, the more likely for sexual cannibalism to occur. Thus, sexual cannibalism in T. helluo can be viewed similarly to a predator–prey interaction where size difference affects the actions of each. Another factor that impacts the degree of sexual cannibalism for T. helluo is the female condition. Females who have been starved and therefore are hungry are more likely to cannibalize than females who are well fed. It is possible that males can maximize their fitness by mating only with well-fed females. The male condition can also affect the possibility of sexual cannibalism. Older males or males in poorer condition, while they might not be very small, are more vulnerable to females. Therefore, they are more likely to alter their copulatory behavior depending on their perceived risk of being cannibalized. These males can invest more into a single copulation by engaging for longer because they are at a high risk of being eaten after mating.

=== Copulation ===
The process of copulation for T. helluo consists of a series of interactions between the male palp and the female epigynum. First, the male will mount the female such that they are facing opposite from each other. The underside of the male's cephalothorax is positioned against the dorsal section of the female's abdomen. The male then will signal the female to rotate the abdomen by touching the anterior of the female abdomen. After this, the male will use his palp to engage with the female's abdomen and epigynum. The right and left palps will interact with the right and left sides of the epigynum. After the palp and epigynum are engaged, the male will expand his hematodocha, causing his embolus to enter the female copulatory duct. Semen is then exchanged. This interaction is called an insertion. During a single insertion, the male may also expand his hematodocha multiple times. However, it is often only a single expansion per insertion. T. helluo will also engage in more than one insertion per copulation. Usually, one insertion will happen per side of the male palp. Copulation for T. helluo will typically last around eight minutes.

== Diet ==
=== Prey ===
Wolf spiders typically eat different kinds of insects or even other smaller spiders like Pardosa milvina. They are nocturnal so they wait for prey and hunt at night. T. helluo can survive on insects such as crickets, fly grubs, cockroaches, mealworms, and even beetles.

=== Effects of diet on survivorship ===
T. helluo is able to feed on a large variety of prey and thus enjoys a mixed diet of different insects. A 1992 study assessing the effects of polytypic versus monotypic diets on wolf spiders found that T. helluo individuals raised on polytypic diets had significantly higher survivorship and reached sexual maturity earlier than individuals consuming a monotypic diet. Certain body parts like the cephalothorax and legs were also significantly larger at maturity in the polytypic diet group.

=== Effects of diet on behavior ===
A 1999 study examining the effect of feeding on burrow construction for T. helluo reported that hunger level significantly impacts its behavioral decisions. In comparison to starved spiders, well-fed individuals had a better nutritional state and made significantly more burrows. Since males do not make burrows, they were not included in the study.

== Predators ==
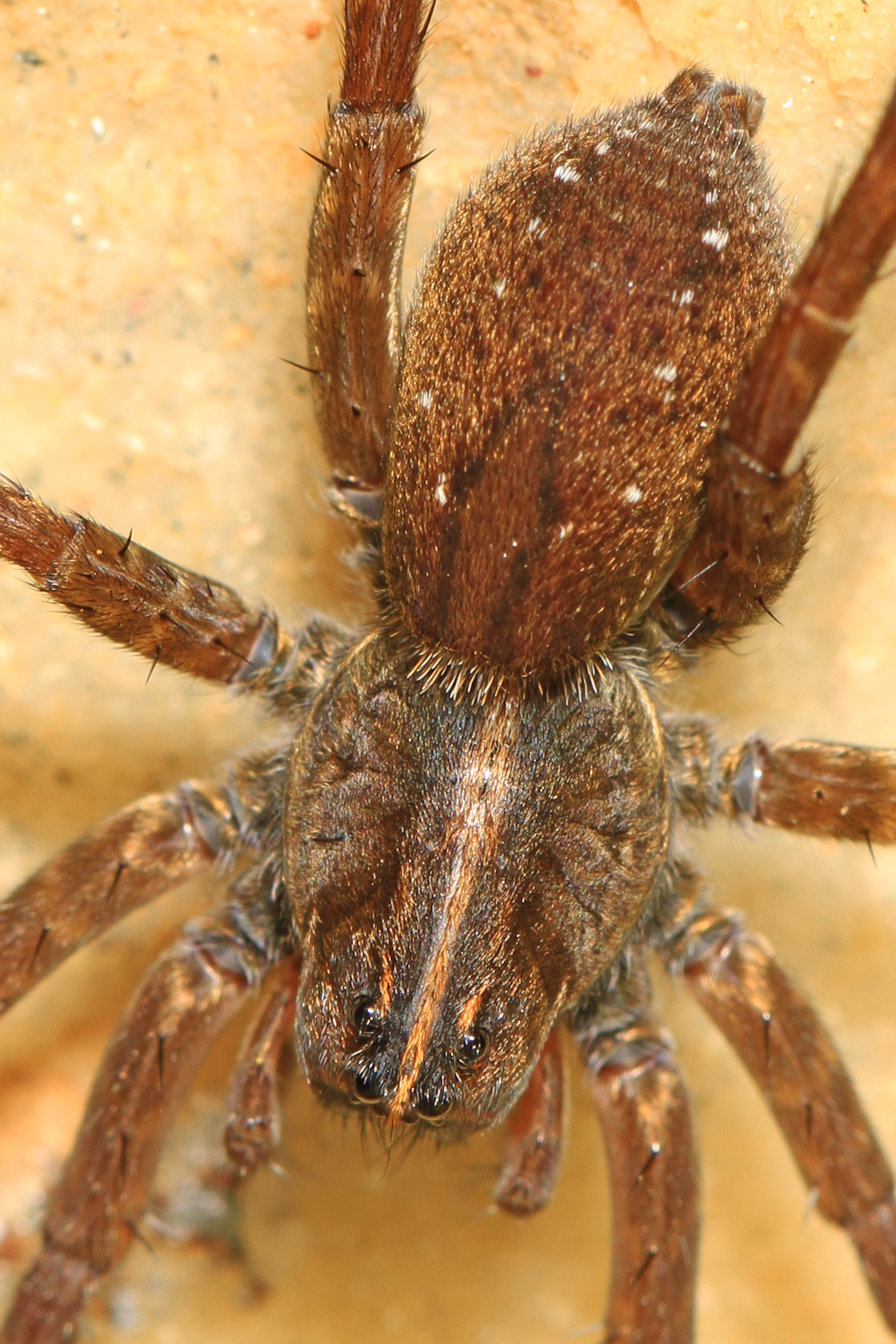
Tigrosa helluo female

Although they are hunters, wolf spiders are also preyed upon by other organisms such as praying mantises, birds, wasps, small reptiles, and even other spiders. Lycosidae have fantastic vision and are sensitive to vibrations, so they use these senses to detect and evade predators. They also use their speed and camouflage from their natural coloring to avoid predators. Females of the species T. helluo make burrows in secluded habitats, such as underneath stones, that can also function as a place to hide from predators. If needed, T. helluo can also bite predators and inject venom.

== Behavior ==
=== Hunting ===
T. helluo typically switches between a few different foraging sites. Females build burrows of silk and wait for prey to show up in their current foraging site. Males typically roam around and wait for prey. Like all wolf spiders, T. helluo is a solitary hunter and will hunt alone, meeting with other spiders only to mate.

=== Chemical cues in hunting ===
A 2001 study examining chemical cues in T. helluo suggests that T. helluo is able to detect chemical cues from recently hunted prey. The spiders will show a preference for chemical cues that match that of their most recently hunted prey. Thus, further hunting activities will show a dietary preference for the prey species most recently consumed.

It has also been shown that the presence of glyphosate-based herbicide affects prey capture behavior of T. helluo. In the presence of herbicide, T. helluo is better able to detect and orient itself towards prey and therefore is able to subdue prey more efficiently.

=== Communication ===
While wolf spiders are solitary and do not usually associate with others outside mating, communication between individual spiders does occur occasionally. Wolf spiders have some of the best vision of all spiders, so they use visual cues, such as waving their pedipalps, to signal to each other for mating. They are also sensitive to vibrations, scent, and taste.

== Bites ==
=== Bites to humans ===
Wolf spiders are usually not aggressive and will not bite unless readily provoked. They also possess venom that is injected into organisms upon biting. However, to humans, wolf spider bites are generally considered minor and not medically significant. Bites typically cause minor swelling and pain, but no severe complications. Antivenom is not usually needed to treat wolf spider bites.

== Differences from Pardosa milvina ==
Both Pardosa milvina and Tigrosa helluo are among the more common wolf spider species in the United States, but they do have behavioral differences in their hunting approaches. Whereas T. helluo tends to wait for prey to pass by its location prior to attacking, P. milvina goes out to find its prey. However, the much smaller size of P. milvina also makes it prey for T. helluo.
