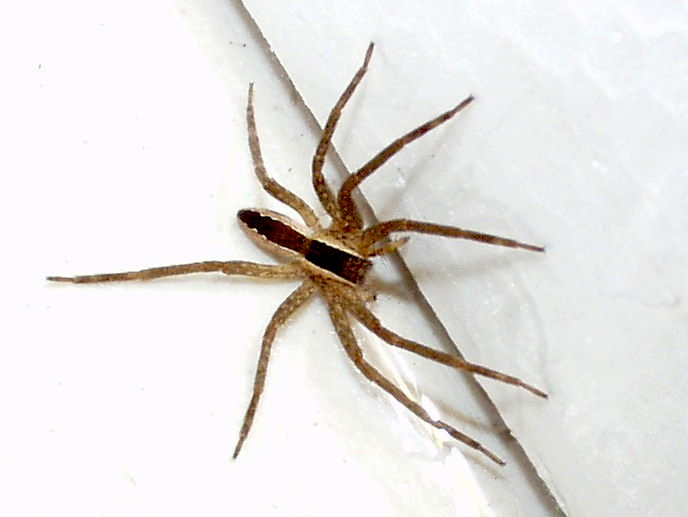

Scientific classification
- Domain: Eukaryota
- Kingdom: Animalia
- Phylum: Arthropoda
- Subphylum: Chelicerata
- Class: Arachnida
- Order: Araneae
- Infraorder: Araneomorphae
- Family: Pisauridae
- Genus: Pisaurina
- Species: P. brevipes

Binomial name
- Pisaurina brevipes (Emerton, 1911)

= Pisaurina brevipes =

Species of spider

Pisaurina brevipes is a species of "nursery web spider" that is found in the eastern half of the North American continent, from Ontario down to Florida and west to Kansas.

P. brevipes is distinguished from the similar Pisaurina mira by having relatively shorter legs. The ratio of patella-tibia I length to cephalothorax length is less than 2.0 in males and less than 1.4 in females, whereas for P. mira the patella-tibia I length ratio is more than 2.0 in males and more than 1.4 in females. The edges of the abdominal band are more straight edged than in P. mira.

The natural history of P. brevipes is not well known. The only records known to Carico seem to indicate that they favor grasslands, bogs, and swamps. These spiders rear their young in nurseries, which are bell-like structures of spider web laid out in a sheet form.

P. brevipes is difficult to distinguish from P. mira, unless the pedipalps of the males are examined. The reason is that its coloration patterns fall within the natural range of variation of the more numerous P. mira.

The females of P. brevipes have a body length of 11 to 13 mm, and the males are about 10.8 mm.
