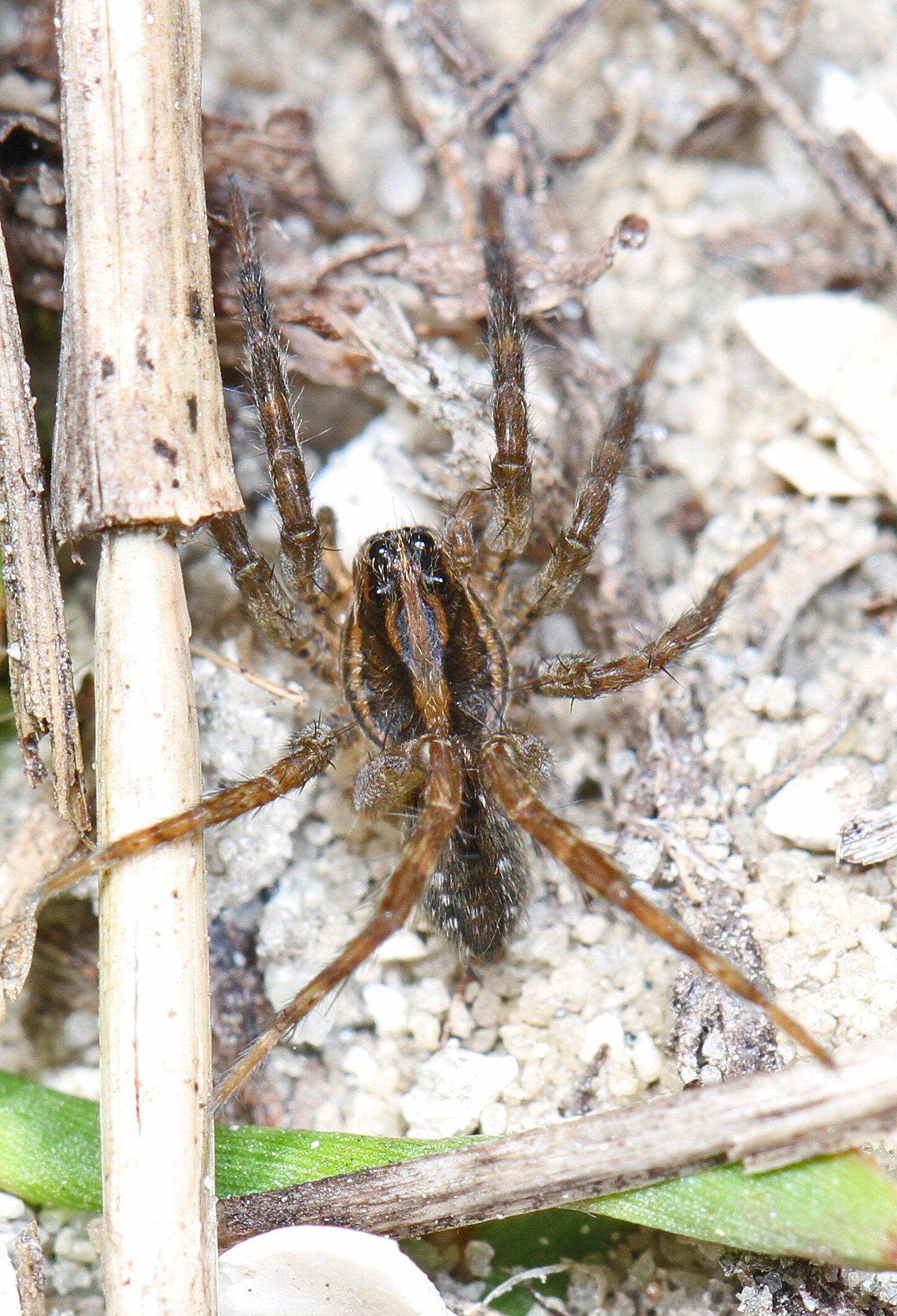
- Tigrosa annexa from Lake Placid, Florida

Scientific classification
- Kingdom: Animalia
- Phylum: Arthropoda
- Subphylum: Chelicerata
- Class: Arachnida
- Order: Araneae
- Infraorder: Araneomorphae
- Family: Lycosidae
- Genus: Tigrosa; Brady, 2012

= Tigrosa =

Genus of spiders

Tigrosa is a genus of spiders in the family Lycosidae, found in North America.

== Taxonomy ==
The genus Tigrosa was erected by Allen R. Brady in 2012. Prior to 1990, many medium to large wolf spiders (family Lycosidae) from North America were placed in the genus Lycosa. In 1990 it was accepted that Lycosa was a Mediterranean genus and did not occur in North America; seven species were transferred to Hogna. A more detailed examination of the type species of Hogna, Hogna radiata, convinced Brady that a new genus was needed for some of the North American species that had been moved to Hogna. Characters that distinguish Tigrosa from Hogna include the pattern on the upper (dorsal) surface of the cephalothorax, the arrangement of the eyes, and the shape of the female epigyne.

The generic name Tigrosa is intended to mean "fierce like a tiger", referring to the patterning and behaviour of Tigrosa species.

== Species ==
As of May 2016, the World Spider Catalog accepted the following species:

- Tigrosa annexa (Chamberlin & Ivie, 1944) – USA
- Tigrosa aspersa (Hentz, 1844) – USA, Canada
- Tigrosa georgicola (Walckenaer, 1837) – USA
- Tigrosa grandis (Banks, 1894) – USA
- Tigrosa helluo (Walckenaer, 1837) (type species) – USA, Canada, Mexico
