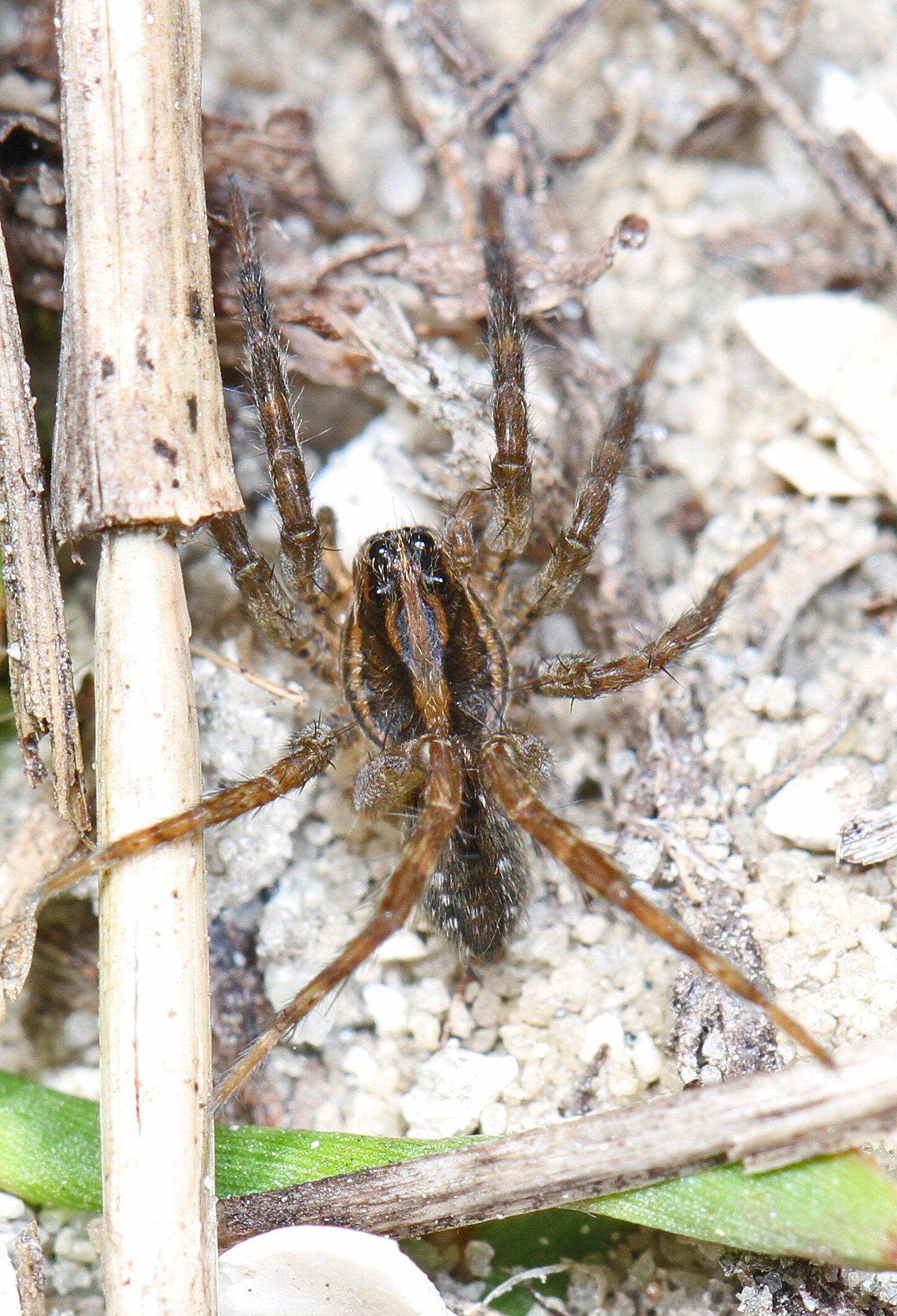

Scientific classification
- Kingdom: Animalia
- Phylum: Arthropoda
- Subphylum: Chelicerata
- Class: Arachnida
- Order: Araneae
- Infraorder: Araneomorphae
- Family: Lycosidae
- Genus: Tigrosa
- Species: T. annexa

Binomial name
- Tigrosa annexa (Chamberlin & Ivie, 1944)

Synonyms
- Lycosa annexa Chamberlin & Ivie, 1944 Hogna annexa Roewer, 1955

= Tigrosa annexa =

Species of spider

Tigrosa annexa is a species of wolf spider (Lycosidae) native to eastern North America from Texas, east to Florida, and north to Ohio.

== Description ==
Males measured in Mississippi had an average total length of 26.17 millimeters, ranging from 21.3 to 32.1 millimeters. Females were smaller, measuring 17.96 (16.5 to 20.0) on average. Tigrosa annexa has two distinct dark brown to black bars on the back of the cephalothorax, often with lighter yellowish gray lines on each side.

Distinguished from Tigrosa helluo and Tigrosa georgicola by the presence of two white dashes behind the posterior median eyes.

== Ecology ==
A study in Everglades National Park found Tigrosa annexa to be most abundant in tropical hardwood hammock forests with xeric or limestone soil. This species prefers grass over sand to better camouflage with their environment.

Tigrosa annexa feeds on small invertebrates such as may beetles and mole crickets. They are preyed on by larger spiders and spider wasps.

=== Reproduction ===
During the pre-emergence stage, female wolf spiders carry the egg sacs suspended from their spinnerets, rather than making a web like many other spiders. The post-emergence stage begins in 4 to 6 weeks, in which the female tears open the egg sac for the spiderlings to emerge. The emerged offspring then remain on the mother’s back for 1 to 2 weeks before dispersing. Female Tigrosa annexa produce small numbers of larger offspring. Body mass was found to be correlated with both clutch mass and the number of offspring, with larger females producing larger offspring at higher clutch sizes.

Females are known to engage in cannibalism after copulating. Males have shown courtship behaviors in response to female silk pheromones.

== Taxonomy ==
Tigrosa annexa was originally described in the genus Lycosa, until it was moved to Hogna due to a dispute on geographic distribution. Allen R. Brady described the genus Tigrosa in 2012, which T. annexa was placed in along with three other North American wolf spiders.
