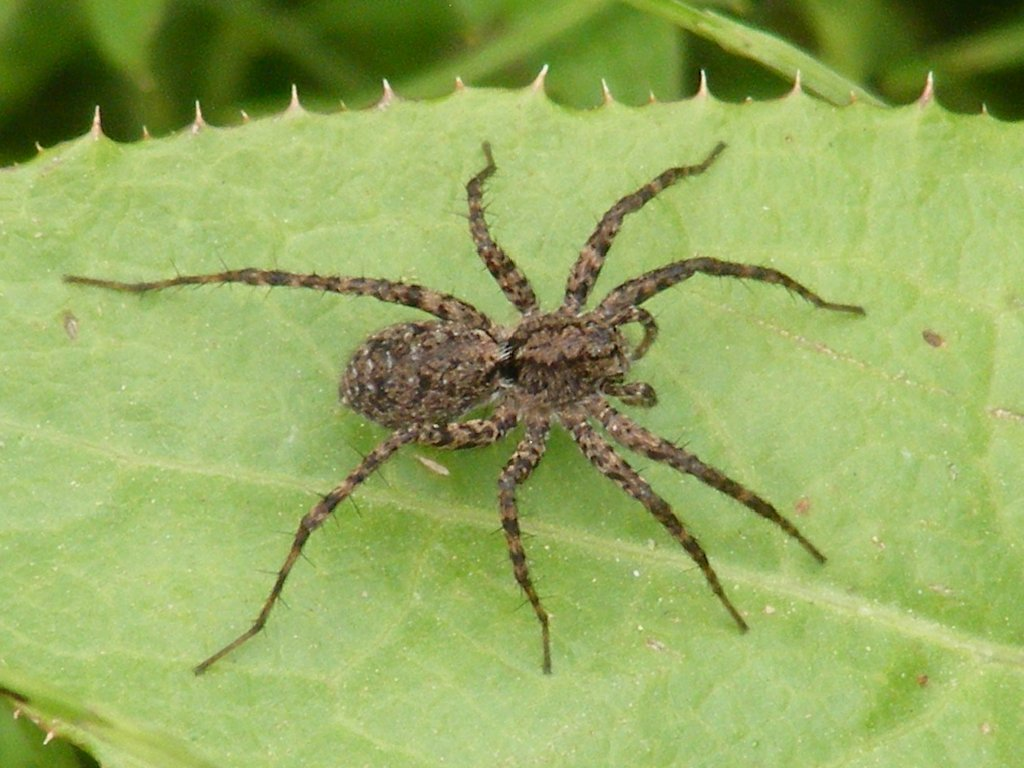

Scientific classification
- Kingdom: Animalia
- Phylum: Arthropoda
- Subphylum: Chelicerata
- Class: Arachnida
- Order: Araneae
- Infraorder: Araneomorphae
- Family: Lycosidae
- Genus: Pardosa
- Species: P. milvina

Binomial name
- Pardosa milvina (Hentz, 1844)

= Pardosa milvina =

Species of arachnid

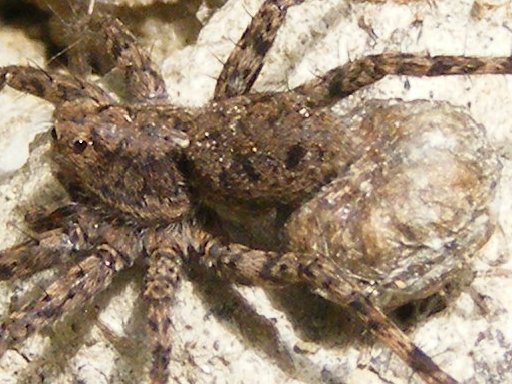
Shore spider, Pardosa milvina

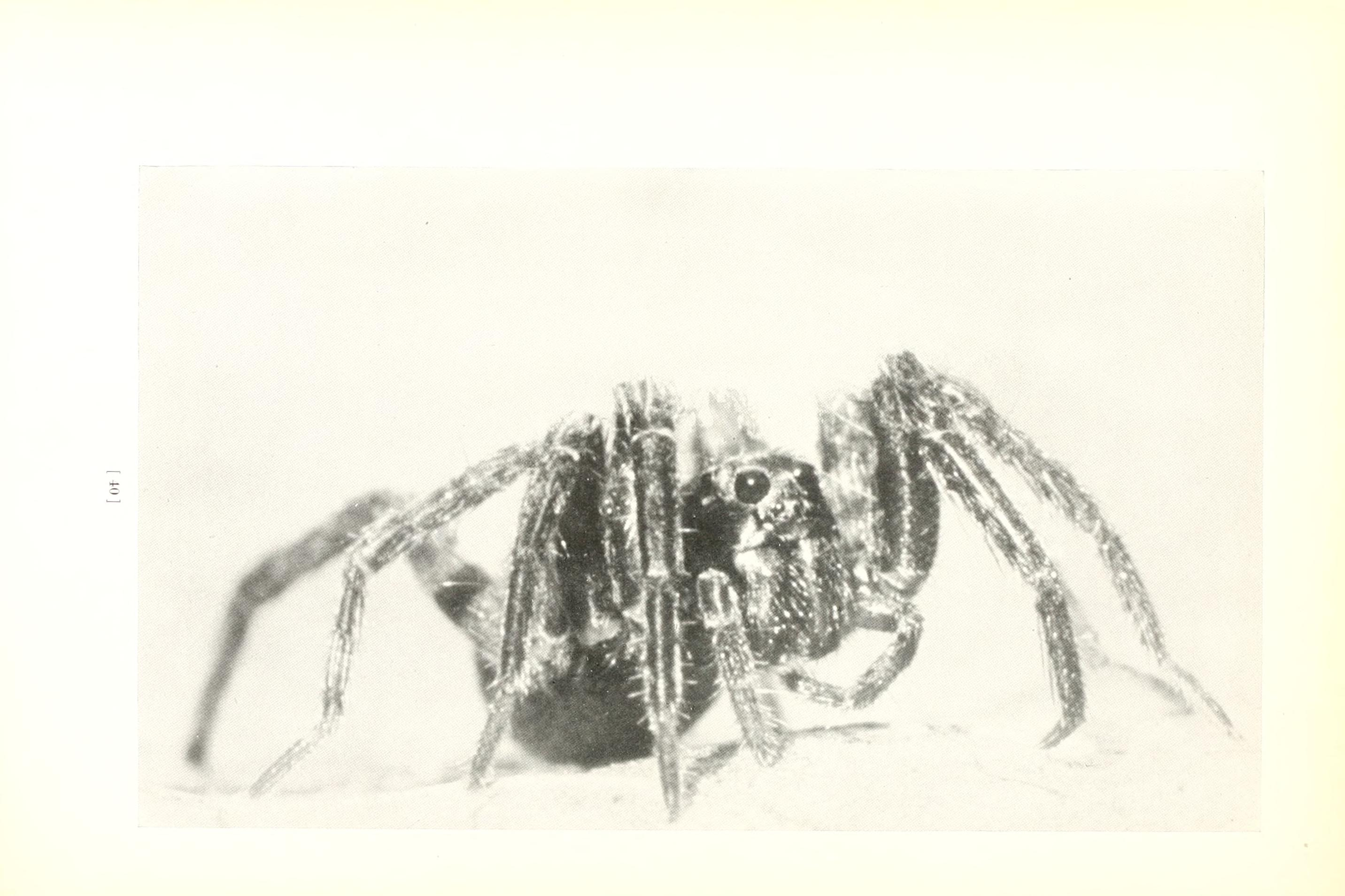
Book of monsters (Page 40) BHL4428088

Pardosa milvina, the shore spider, is a species in the wolf spider family. They are mainly found near rivers and in agricultural areas in eastern North America. P. milvina feed on a large variety of small insects and spiders. Ground beetles such as Scarites quadriceps and large wolf spiders such as Tigrosa helluo are predators of P. milvina. P. milvina are smaller spiders with thin, long legs. This species captures prey such as arthropods with their legs and then kills them with their venom. Their predators are larger wolf spiders and beetles. P. milvina are able to detect these predators from chemotactile and vibratory cues. These spiders lose limbs when escaping from predators and they can change their preferred location in order to avoid predators. P. milvina also use chemical cues in order to mate. During their mating ritual, the male raises his legs and shakes his body. Both males and females can use silk, a chemotactile cue, for sexual communication. Additionally, female shore spiders heavily invest in their offspring, keeping them in egg sacs and carrying them for a few weeks after they are born.

== Description ==
The shore spider’s eyes are arranged in a characteristic pattern with the top row having four eyes and the subsequent rows having only two eyes each. They have thin, long legs with long spines. Pardosa milvina cannot climb smooth surfaces due to their lack of tufts of hair that are common at the end of legs on other spiders. These wolf spiders have smaller chelicerae and more wavy dorsal stripes than other spiders in this family. They have yellow spots on their abdomen and males have white hairs on their kneecaps. Shore spiders are a smaller spider, as the largest female is approximately 6.2 mm in length and the largest male is approximately 4.7 mm. Additionally, female spiders carry large egg sacs.

== Habitat and Distribution ==
Pardosa milvina are located in high densities near rivers and agricultural areas of eastern North America. There are large variances in their abundance throughout the year, between months, or even from one year to the next. They can also be found in dry, open woods near water, such as by rivers, ponds, and streams of New England, Georgia, and west of the Rockies. Additionally, shore spiders are abundant in disturbed habitats and are commonly found on soil surfaces or in patches of mulch.

== Diet ==
Pardosa milvina are active cursorial predators and active foragers. They feed on ground-dwelling arthropods like crickets. Thesey also consume Diptera, Collembola, Homoptera, Thysanoptera, small Orthoptera, and small spiders. Although they are smaller spiders, they can overwhelm their prey with their chelicerae and legs. This species grabs prey with their legs and chelicerae, biting the prey until it is killed by the spider's venom. They sometimes roll onto their backs when they are fighting with the prey. They can also eat juvenile Hogna helluo.

== Enemies ==
=== Predators ===
Larger wolf spiders like Tigrosa helluo and Hogna helluo are predators of P. milvina. Ground beetles such as Scarites quadriceps are also predators of the shore spider. The adult Hogna helluo is 20 times larger than Pardosa. The egg sacs of female P. milvina contribute to predation and foraging costs. Females that don't have egg sacs are able to avoid predation as they are able to move more easily.

=== Parasites ===
One acrocerid that parasitizes P. milvina is Ogcodes eugonatus. Another parasite of shore spiders are mermithid nematode endoparasites. These can emerge from the ventral abdomen of shore spiders. Mermithids can cause behavioral and morphological changes in spiders, such as slower reaction times to predators, abdominal swelling, malformed legs and pedipalps, and undeveloped secondary sexual characteristics.

== Protective Behaviors ==
=== Detecting Predators ===
Predators can announce their presence through signals or predator cues. P. milvina use chemotactile predator cues like silk, faeces, and other excreta in order to determine when a predator is nearby. They are then able to respond to the amount of predation risk based on these cues. When visual or chemotactile predator cues are not present, P. milvina can use vibratory cues in order to assess the risk from the predator. When they detect these predators through these cues, P. milvina decrease their activity. They only decrease activity when the predator is alerted to their presence. However, if the predator has not detected that the spider is nearby, this spider continues its activity. P. milvina are more responsive to isolated chemotactile cues as they are usually more reliable than vibratory cues alone. Chemotactile cues from predators can give Pardosa more specific information like the sex, size, diet, and hunger levels of the predator. Usually, these spiders only respond to the most threatening predator's vibratory cues. P. milvina will use vibratory cues mainly when they are the only information available to them.

=== Site Selection ===
P. milvina changes their site preference in order to avoid predators. When there is presumably no danger present, P. milvina prefer more complex grass habitats over bare dirt. However, when there are predator cues, this preference is gone. P. milvina can capture more prey in dirt but they are more likely to be attacked by predators, specifically Hogna helluo. There is a tradeoff between the quality of habitat and the increased risk of predation. The negative effect of predation risk is worse than having slightly less food. P. milvina spiders are active foragers who can go to new habitats when threatened and remain successful in prey capture.

=== Leg Autotomy ===
The loss of legs in P. milvina is quite common. These spiders can sacrifice their legs in order to avoid predation, since these predators grasp their legs during an attack. If a male Pardosa were to lose its first pair of legs, it would decrease his overall fitness. This is because the frontal legs and their symmetry are an important characteristic when courting females. Even with a loss of limbs, there is little difference in the prey capture technique for Pardosa. The only difference is that those with no loss to the frontal legs are able to eat larger prey. This could lower the fitness of females by reducing the size of their egg sacs and number of eggs. When attempting to escape from a predator, P. milvina with leg loss were able to escape as they normally would. However, they might end up losing more limbs from this predator interaction. Spiders with all their legs might be better off because they have more limbs to give up to the predator and therefore escape. P. milvina could be able to survive with less legs since they are born with more legs than they actually require. They are able to give up some limbs in order to escape the predator.

== Mating ==
=== Airborne chemical communication ===
In addition to sexual pheromones on spider silk, research have shown that Pardosa milvina possesses an airborne sexual communication capability. Researchers put unmated and mated females in pitfall traps and observe the behavior of adult males. The result is that males are more likely to fall into the traps with unmated females, showing airborne information can direct males to virgin females.

=== Male Courtship ===
Males use substrate-borne chemical cues to gain information on the mating status of females. When males detect silk and pheromones from a virgin female, their courtship response is more energized. Males court the females by raising their legs and shaking their bodies. The rate at which the males lift their legs is an accurate representation of their assets since females who mate with males that raise their legs rapidly during courtship produce more surviving offspring. P. milvina can identify chemotactile cues like silk or feces from a predator. The courtship activity of males makes them more susceptible to attacks from Tigrosa helluo. The risk of attacks from predators affects the intensity of the male's courtship ritual. The symmetry of the front legs of a male P. milvina is related to the rate of his leg raises. Males with symmetrical front legs have a lower intensity courtship when there are predator cues present as they have a high potential for future mating and reproduction. However, males with asymmetrical front legs court with high intensity when predator cues are present because they are desperate to mate and reproduce as they might not have many opportunities.

=== Sexual Communication ===
Female silk evokes male courtship behavior. Spiders use silk to chemically communicate with each other. Females use silk to release their sex pheromones indicating their mating status and willingness to mate with males. P. milvina produces three types of silk: dragline silk, attachment disks, and cord silk. Dragline silk are thin, white strands made from ampullate glands and are most likely used to get male attention. Attachment disks are made from piriform silk glands and can be used to keep dragline silk on to the substrate. However, these can still be made without other silk types. For example, male P. milvina use attachment disks to find the correct direction to follow females. Cord silk are thick, tan strands and are usually short. Females are able to tell the difference between silk from courting males and from non-courting males. When females are in the presence of courting males, they deposit more attachment disks and dragline silk. Cord silk deposition does not differ with the presence of courting or non-courting males. Females might be enhancing directional signals in order for the males to use attachment disks to follow females. This shows how silk is used for sexual communication.

== Parental care ==
=== Egg sacs ===
Females invest in brooding their offspring by making an egg sac by wrapping the eggs with fibrous sheets of silk. They attach this egg sac to their Spinneret and carry the sac for 12 to 30 days. The egg sac is off-white, tan, or blue in color. After this carrying period, the egg sac is torn and spiderlings emerge. These spiderlings are still carried by their mother for 3 to 24 days. The size and weight of these egg sacs make it harder for the female to attack prey and avoid predators. Occasionally, female shore spiders drop their egg sacs which could result in the death of the spiderlings.
