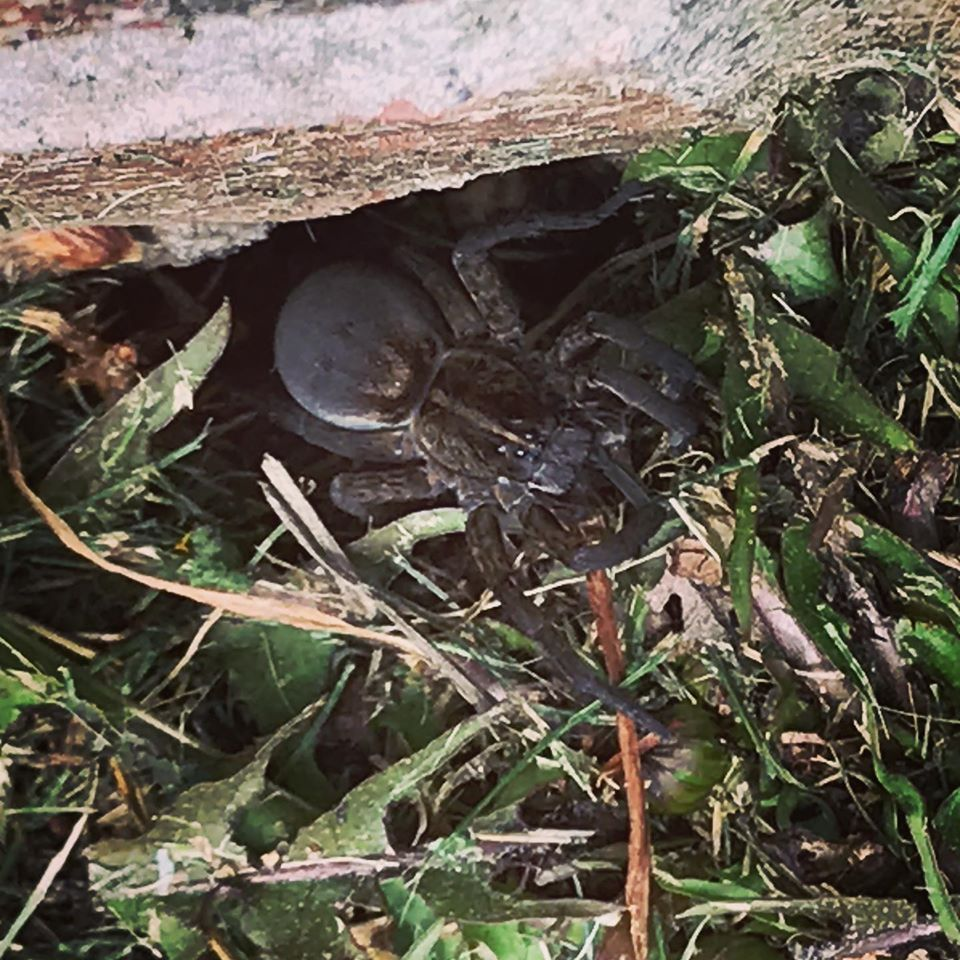

Scientific classification
- Kingdom: Animalia
- Phylum: Arthropoda
- Subphylum: Chelicerata
- Class: Arachnida
- Order: Araneae
- Infraorder: Araneomorphae
- Family: Lycosidae
- Genus: Tigrosa
- Species: T. aspersa

Binomial name
- Tigrosa aspersa (Hentz, 1844)

Synonyms
- Lycosa aspersa Tarentula inhonesta Lycosa tigrina Lycosa vulpina Lycosa immaculata Lycosa exitiosa Lycosa oblonga Lycosa inhonesta Hygrolycosa aspersa Hogna aspersa

= Tigrosa aspersa =

Species of spider

Tigrosa aspersa is a large (up to one-inch (25 mm) body length) wolf spider that inhabits the eastern United States. Compared to its close relative Tigrosa helluo, T. aspersa is much larger. This species was known as Hogna aspersa prior to 2012, when it was moved to Tigrosa.

A different species (Lycosa implacida) was named Lycosa aspersa in 1849 by Nicolet by accident.
