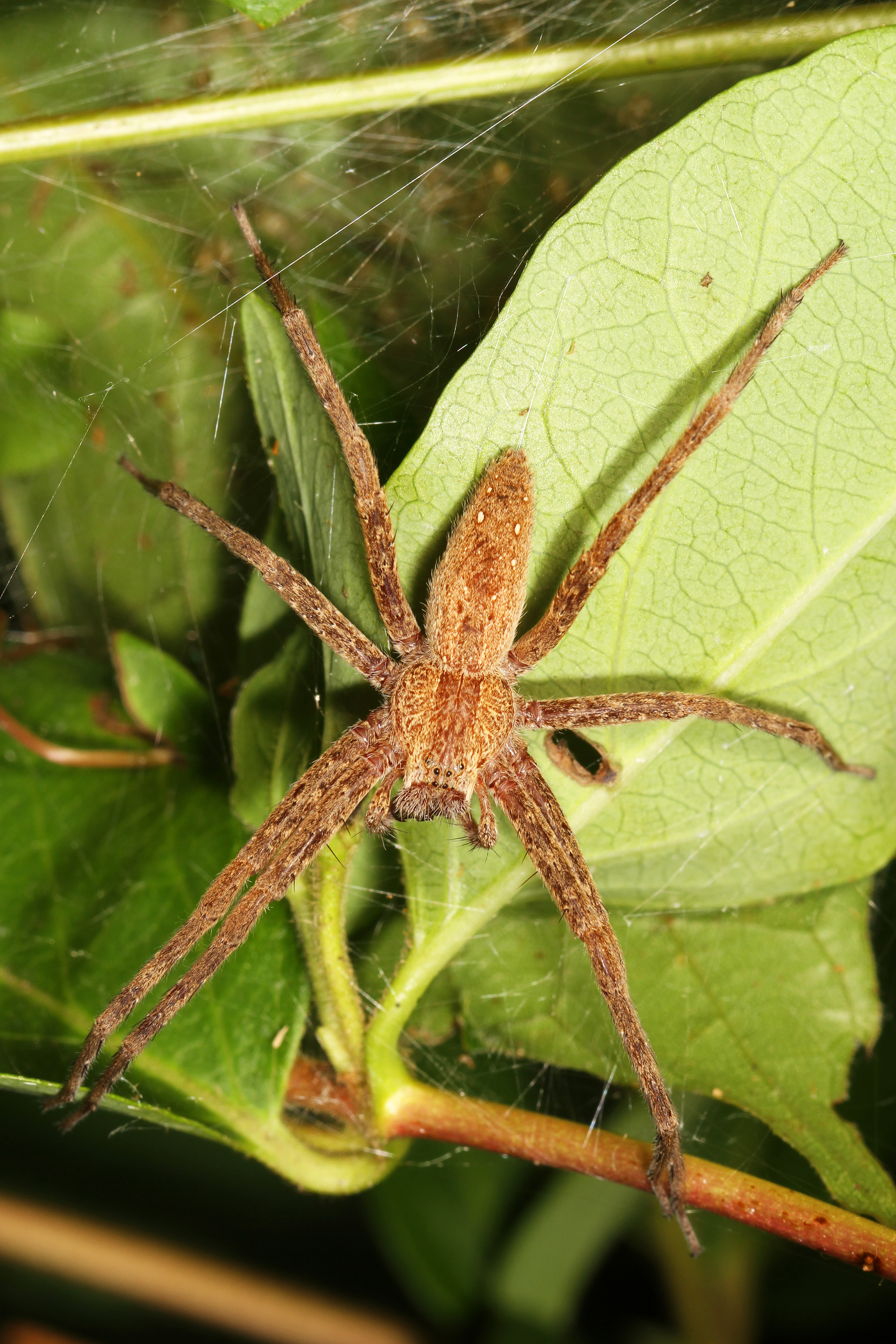
- Pisaurina mira from Mason Neck, Virginia
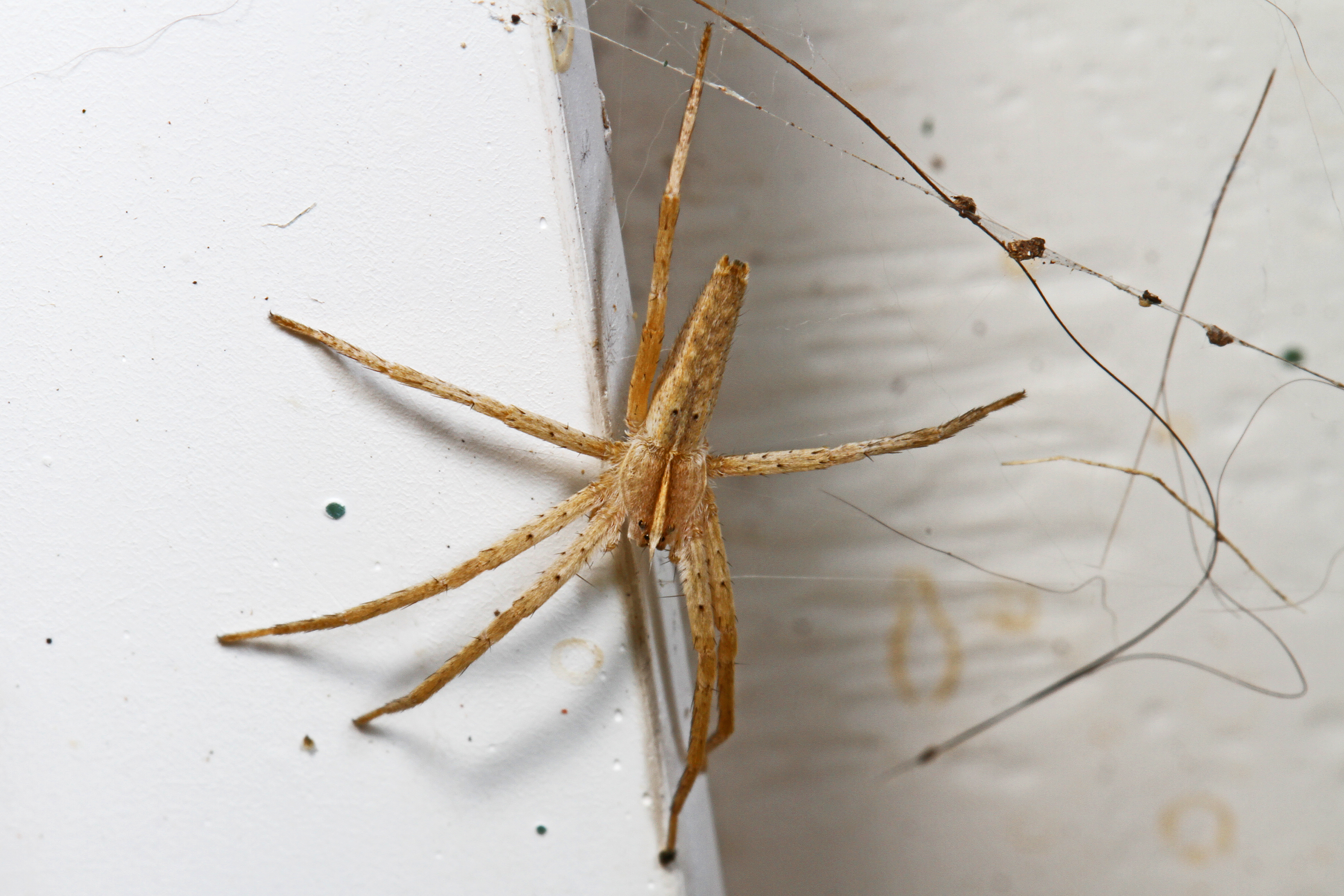
- Pisaurina dubia from Woodbridge, Virginia

Scientific classification
- Kingdom: Animalia
- Phylum: Arthropoda
- Subphylum: Chelicerata
- Class: Arachnida
- Order: Araneae
- Infraorder: Araneomorphae
- Family: Pisauridae
- Genus: Pisaurina; Simon, 1898

Type species
- P. mira (Walckenaer, 1837)

Species
- 4, see text

Synonyms
- Pelopatis Bishop, 1924; Thanatidius Simon, 1898

= Pisaurina =

Genus of spiders

Pisaurina is a genus of nursery web spiders that was first described by Eugène Louis Simon in 1898. It likes to live within vegetated areas such as meadows, bushes or tall grass, preferring warm or tropical areas to settle down and reproduce.

== Species ==
As of June 2019 it contains four species, found only in Canada, the United States, and on the Greater Antilles:

- Pisaurina brevipes (Emerton, 1911) – USA, Canada
- Pisaurina dubia (Hentz, 1847) – USA
- Pisaurina mira (Walckenaer, 1837) (type) – USA, Canada
- Pisaurina undulata (Keyserling, 1887) – USA, Cuba
