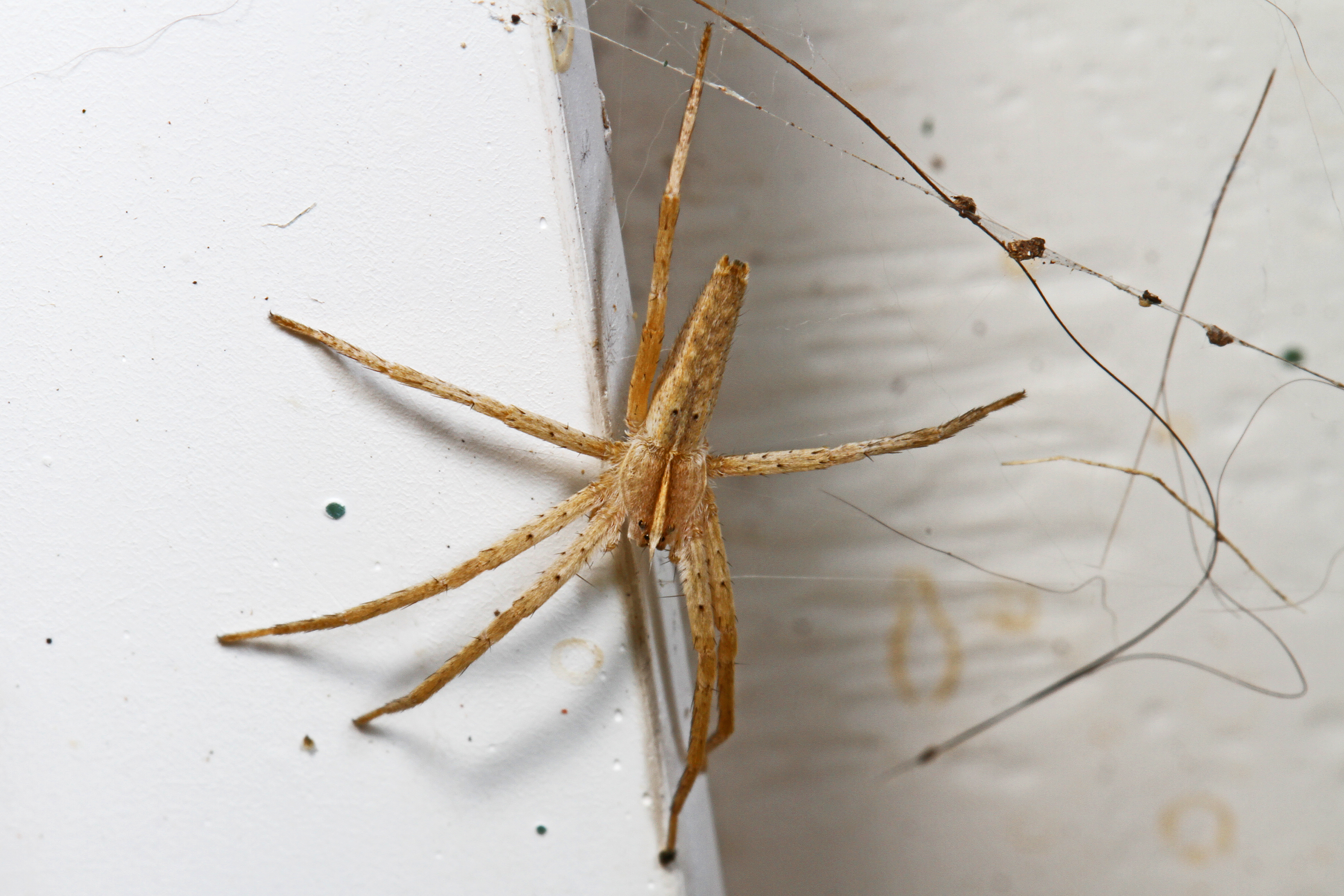

Scientific classification
- Domain: Eukaryota
- Kingdom: Animalia
- Phylum: Arthropoda
- Subphylum: Chelicerata
- Class: Arachnida
- Order: Araneae
- Infraorder: Araneomorphae
- Family: Pisauridae
- Genus: Pisaurina
- Species: P. dubia

Binomial name
- Pisaurina dubia (Hentz, 1847)

= Pisaurina dubia =

Species of spider

Pisaurina dubia is a species of nursery web spider in the family Pisauridae. It is found in the United States.
