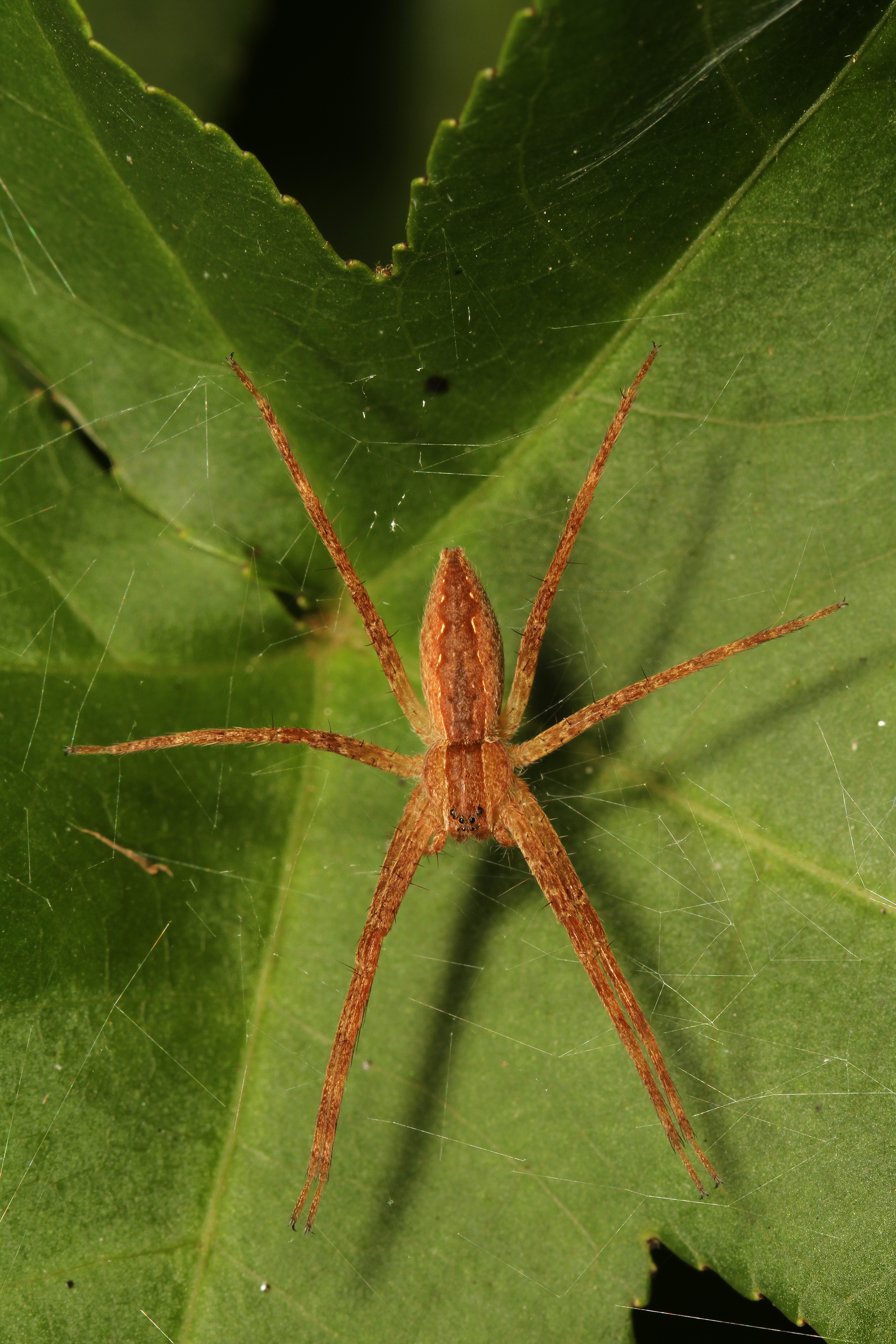

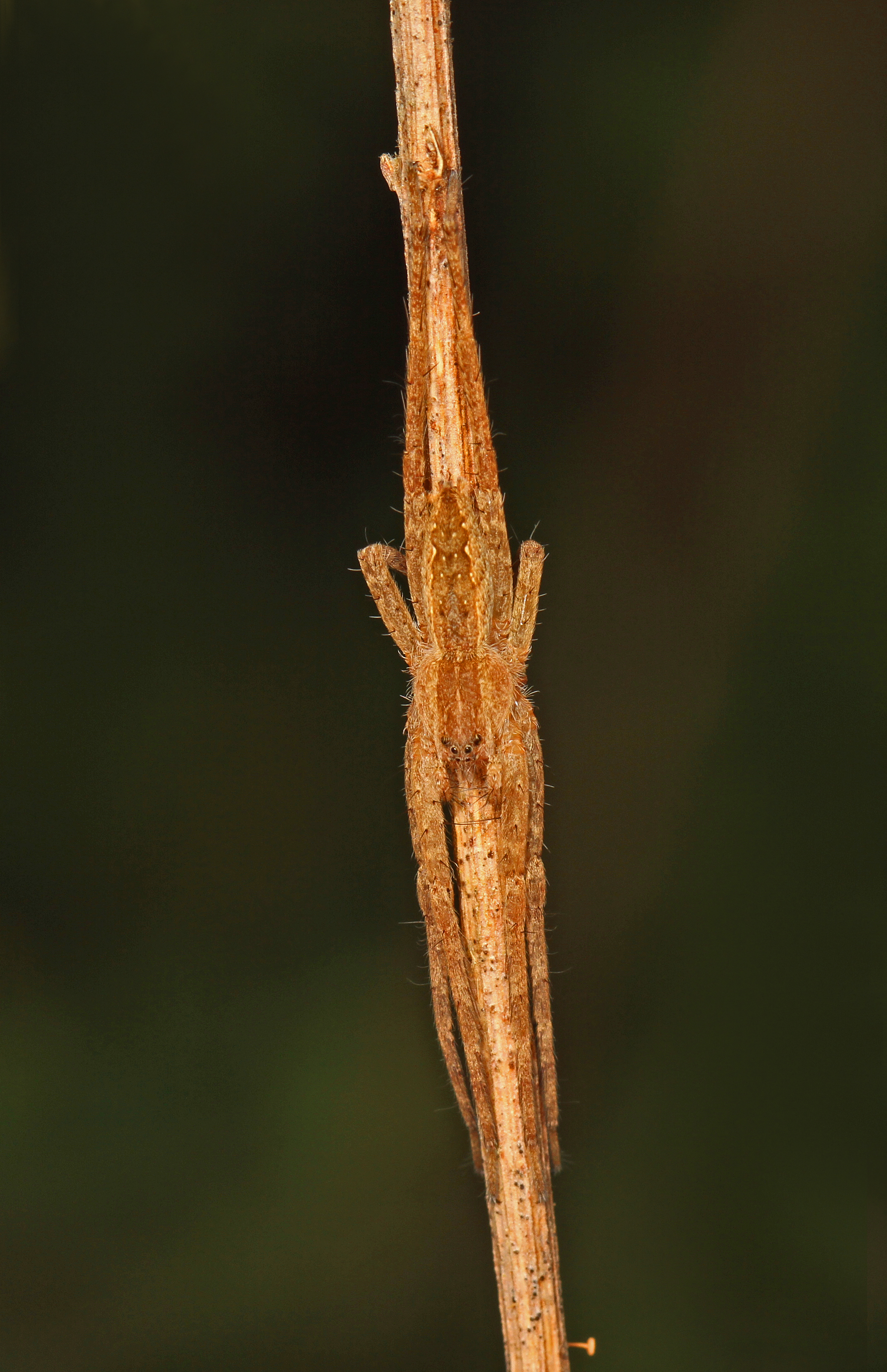

Scientific classification
- Kingdom: Animalia
- Phylum: Arthropoda
- Subphylum: Chelicerata
- Class: Arachnida
- Order: Araneae
- Infraorder: Araneomorphae
- Family: Pisauridae
- Genus: Pisaurina
- Species: P. mira

Binomial name
- Pisaurina mira (Walckenaer, 1837)

= Pisaurina mira =

Species of spider

Pisaurina mira, also known as the American nursery web spider, due to the web it raises young in, is a species of spider in the family Pisauridae. They are often mistaken for wolf spiders (Lycosidae) due to their physical resemblance. P. mira is distinguished by its unique eye arrangement of two rows.

P. mira is known for its wide distribution across eastern North America and tend to inhabit high weeds or low shrubs in ecotonal areas. It is categorized as a "sit-and-wait ambush predator" that waits for prey to come within reach and snatches them using its chelicerae (clawlike pincers).

P. mira is most well known for its sexually cannibalistic behavior and extensive use of silk web in mating. Prior to copulation, the male binds the female's legs with his silk to avoid being consumed by the female. This silk use for survival has been found to increase P. mira males' reproductive fitness, as they typically engage in mating with multiple females when not manipulated.

Like other members of the Pisauridae, P. mira carries its eggs along with it in a sac that is secured both by a thread of silk linking it to the spider's spinnerets and by being held by the spider's chelicerae.

When the eggs are nearly ready to hatch the mother builds a nursery web within which the egg sac is then hung. After they hatch, and until their first molt, the infant spiders inhabit the rather large volume enclosed by this nursery web. The mother spider stations herself nearby to defend the nursery. The responsibility of parental care is upheld solely by the female, as males who survive the sexually cannibalistic female during mating depart to mate with more females.

Although the venom of P. mira is enough to kill its prey, which are usually small insects, it is insufficient for any lethal damage to bigger animals or humans.

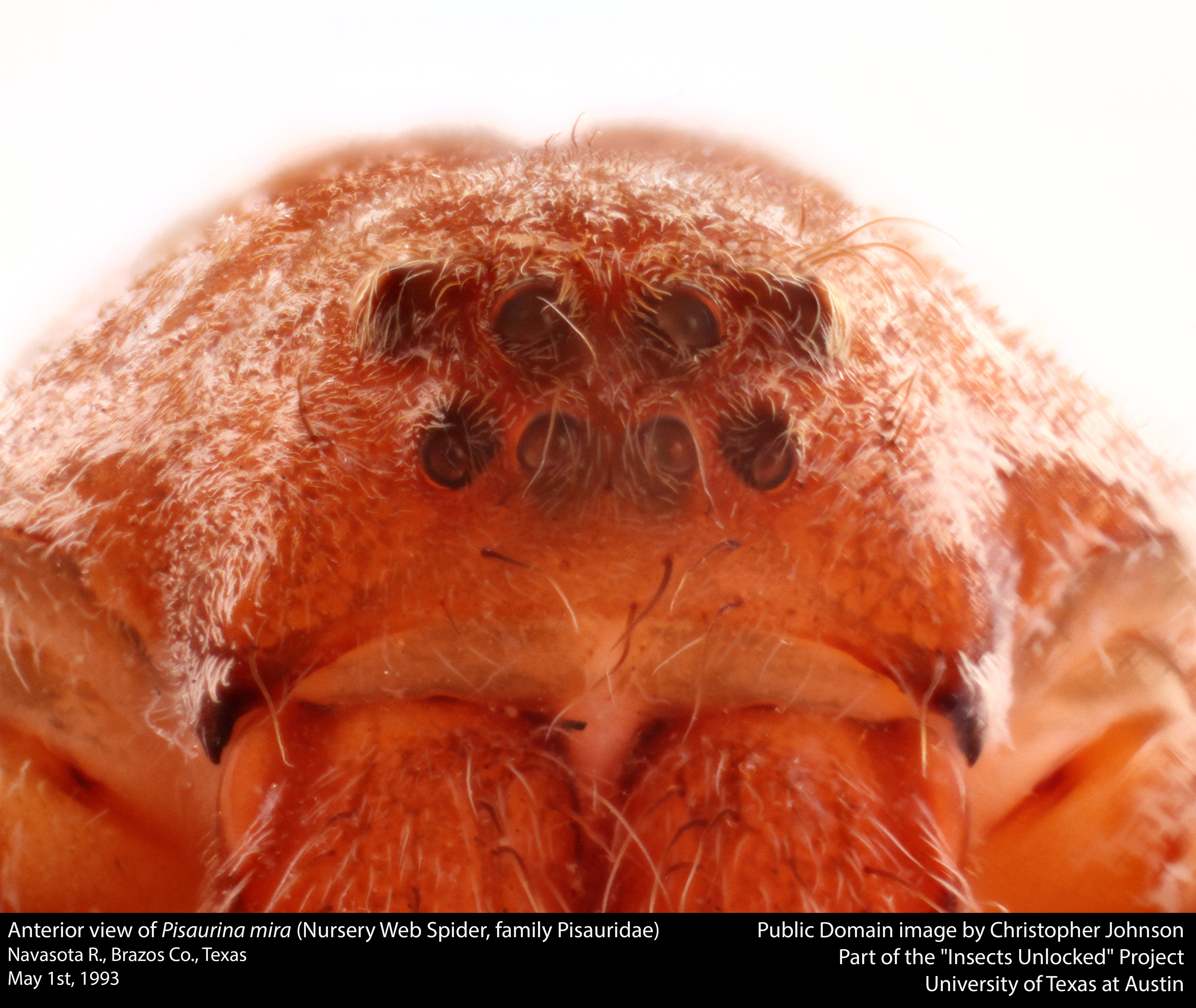
Anterior view demonstrating the typical eye pattern

== Description ==
Pisaurina mira, commonly referred to as the nursery web spider, has a moderately high carapace, a hard layer that provides outer protection for the cephalothorax (combined head and thorax region). The abdomen is moderately long, typically less than twice the length of carapace.

P. mira is distinguished from other species similar in general morphology with its unique straight anterior row of eyes. The eight eyes are arranged in two rows: four eyes in the front form a straight line, and four eyes in the back form a U-shape. It is a sexually dimorphic species, with the male spiders generally having longer legs and a larger leg length to body ratio than the females.

The patterns of P. mira range from a distinct dark median band on the abdomen to an indistinct median band with two rows of lateral spots.

== Habitat ==
Nursery web spiders are wandering hunters. They are usually found on vegetation or at water margins throughout North America. Pisaurina mira is usually seen in the woods and meadows, but it is most populated in the transitional areas between woods and fields. They inhabit tall grass, shrubs, and bushes, which gives them an advantage considering their hunting strategy, waiting for prey to come within their reach and using their pincers ("sit-and-wait ambush predator").

=== Geographic range ===
Nursery web spiders are distributed across Eastern North America, ranging from Ontario and Quebec, extending southward to central Florida and the Rio Grande Valley of Texas. They also extend westward to Minnesota, Kansas, and Oklahoma.

== Diet ==
Pisaurina mira are active hunters. Instead of setting up a spider web to passively wait for prey, the most significant silk use in P. mira is centered around the mating behavior. In order to obtain food, the nursery web spiders wander around, hunting for insects such as gnats and mosquitoes. They use their chelicerae to grab the prey. While P. mira's venom is not lethal, it injects digestive juices into their prey and liquifies the prey's internal organs. The vast majority of nutritional intake for the nursery web spiders come from this soup of liquified organs.

=== Heat tolerance ===
Compared to the wolf spider (Tigrosa helluo), a species that is often considered similar to the nursery web spiders, P. mira exhibits lower heat tolerance (critical thermal maxima parameter (CTM50) = 34 °C). Likewise, with increasing temperature, the nursery web spiders become weaker predators, resulting in noticeably decreased prey mortality rate. At warmer temperatures, there is an increase in metabolism and energy demand. Due to the heat sensitivity of the nursery web spiders, the increased stress stemming from higher temperature result in the relinquishment of remarkable predator abilities.

== Webs ==
Females will gather leaves to build nursery webs when their eggs are near hatching. Once hatched, the spiderlings will inhabit this web until their first molt. During this time, the female guards the web from predators.

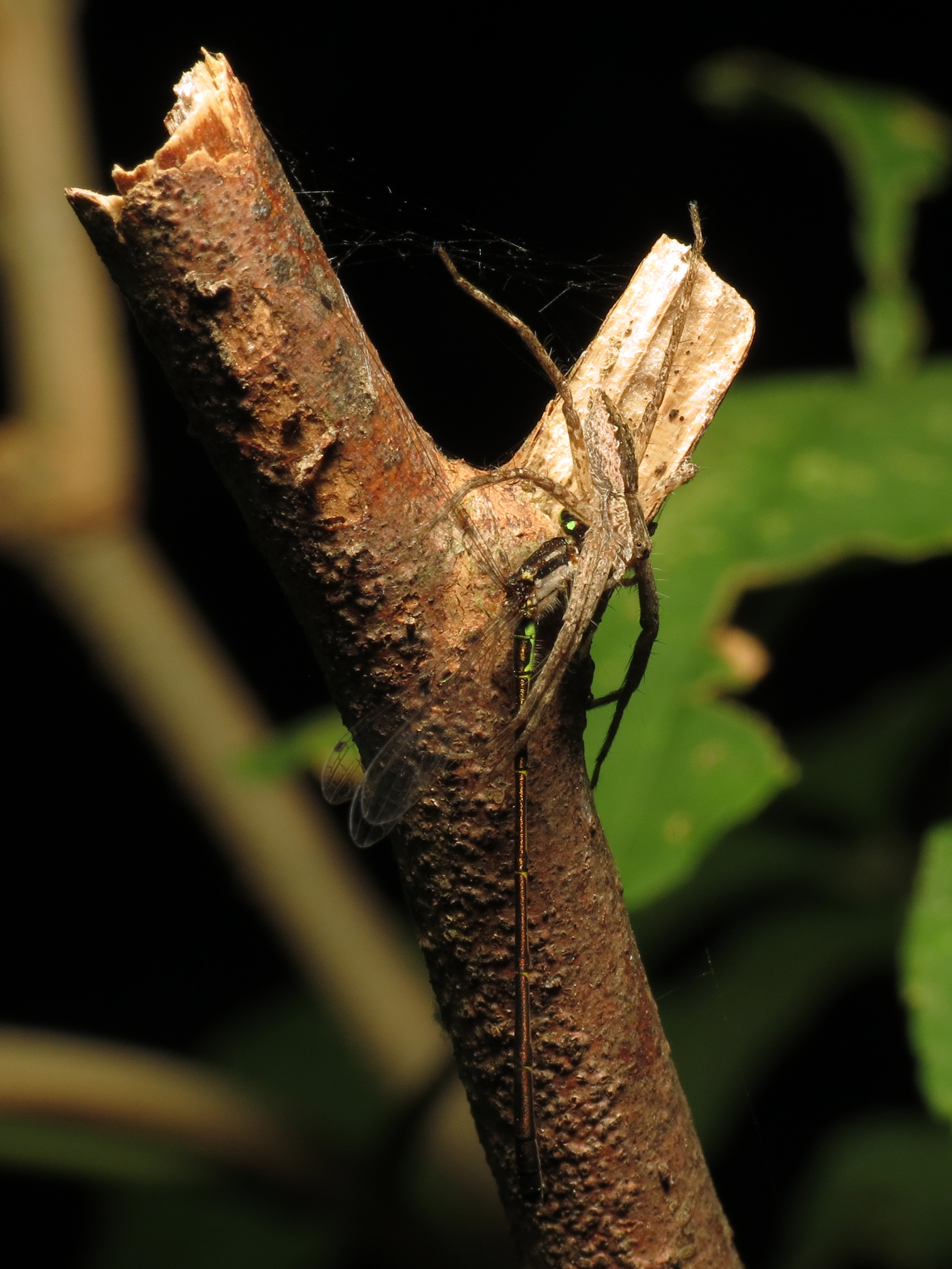
With damselfly prey

== Reproduction ==
Mating for P. mira typically occurs in mid-June to mid-July. The female first transfers her eggs into a cocoon under her abdomen. She embraces this cocoon until the eggs are ready to hatch. While awaiting this process, the female also builds a "nursery web" by gathering leaves together, a safe place where the spiderlings will grow.

Nursery web spiders are known to be univoltine, which means it only has one brood of offspring per year. The care of the offspring is typically solely the female's responsibility; from carrying eggs to maintaining the sac until hatching, the female does most of the work, and the male's role is very limited. The spiderlings molt multiple times, and at each stage, a larger skin develops to accommodate for the growing spider. The weaning phase begins after the spiderlings' first molt, with the departure of spiderlings from the nursery.

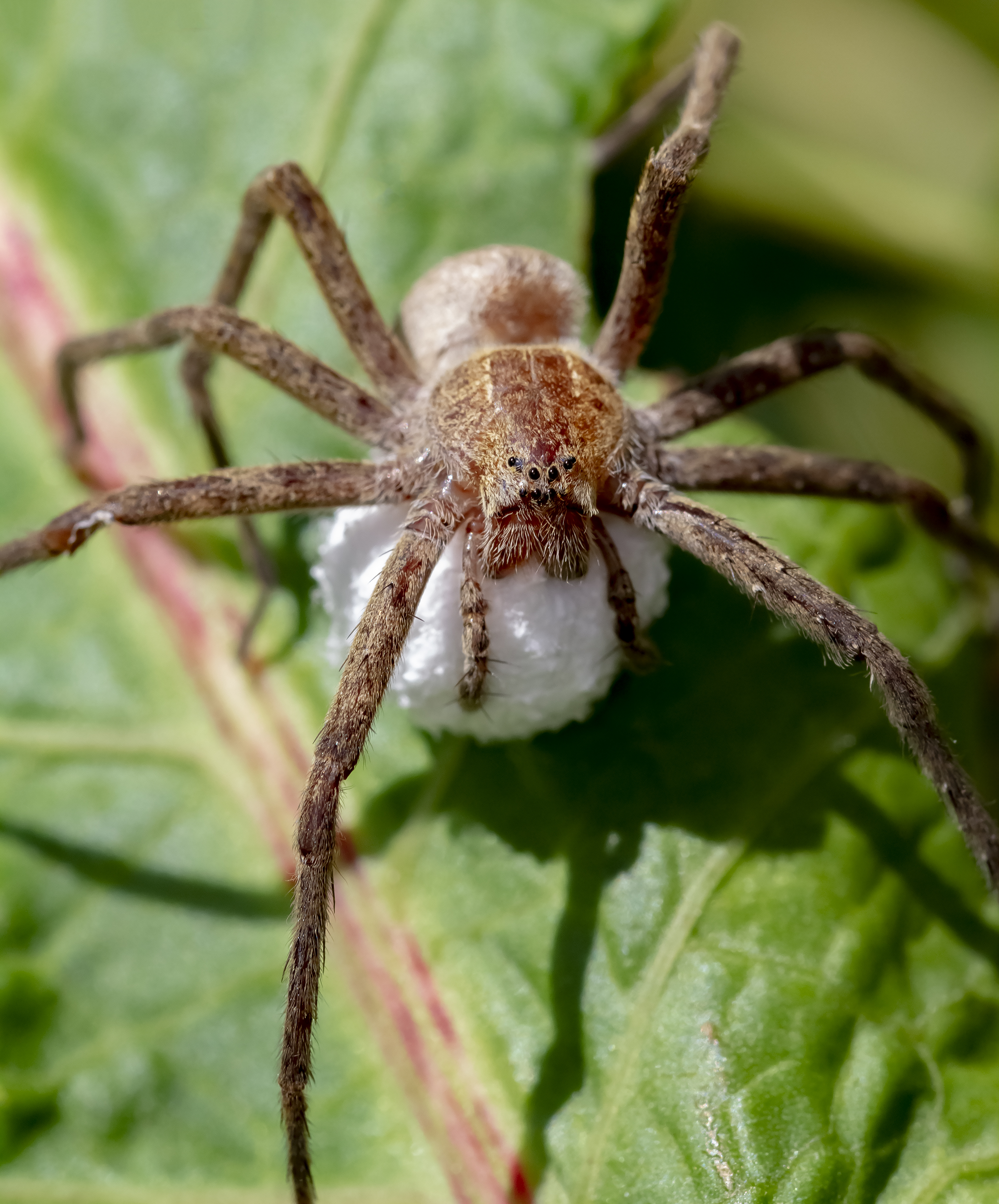
Female with egg sac

== Behavior ==
=== Mating ===
The female P. mira is known to be sexually cannibalistic. In order to avoid being eaten by the female during mating, the male P. mira wraps the legs of the females in silk prior to and during copulation. More specifically, the male uses his silk to immobilize the female's legs I and II while he holds her legs III and IV.

Prior to mating, the male follows the female, periodically releasing his dragline (a line of spider silk). Slowly approaching the female from behind, the male traces the female's path until he reaches the female's hind legs.

For the actual mating stage, both the male and the female release draglines. The female hangs freely from her dragline, while the male uses his dragline to reach the female. The male nursery web spider then rotates the female about three to five times, wrapping his silk around her legs and immobilizing them. Throughout this stage, the legs of the female are fixed in a flexed position, bounded by either the veil of silk from the male, or the legs of the male. Because the male legs play a significant role in immobilizing the female during mating and copulation, longer leg length in males are associated with greater chances of copulation and lower risk of being cannibalized in males.

Because the female grows increasingly active throughout repeated copulations, copulatory silk wrapping is assumed to be an example of a self-defense mechanism adopted by the male nursery spiders. However, as this behavior of female wrapping by the male remains rare among spiders, further investigation is necessary.

=== Number of mates ===
When the male P. mira is able to successfully avoid sexual cannibalism, it mates with multiple females to increase the numbers of offspring. The lack of responsibility for parental care distributed to P. mira is a key component behind this behavior. Unmanipulated male P. mira is known to successfully mate with up to 5 different females, as single mating does not deplete the sperm storage in the pedipalps of the male nursery web spider. Thus, this consecutive mating may occur in relatively short time frames, ranging from a single night to a 72-hour window. Because the use of silk web to immobilize during copulation can ensure a greater chance at multiple mating, we can assume it to be a positive trait that is selected for among the males.

=== Nuptial gift ===
The silk generated by the male P. mira is rather versatile; when courting a female nursery web spider, the male spider offers her a "nuptial gift," usually a prey wrapped up in the male's silk. This act of gift-giving serves as the first stage of mating, preceding copulation. The female spider then has a choice to either accept the gift and follow through with mating, or chase the male away. After copulation, the male typically takes the nuptial gift back with him.

=== Copulation ===
As seen above, copulation in nursery web spiders is facilitated by the unique silk wrapping behavior observed in males. In males, sperm is stored in organs called pedipalps. As male P. mira transfer approximately the same amount of sperm from pedipalps per insertion, increased insertion number was found to result in increased sperm transfer. An increased number of sperm in P. mira also typically leads to an increase in the number of offspring, but the causal relationship still remains unclear. It is, however, still presumed that the silk wrapping is a trait evolved in males for an advantage in sexual selection and a maximization of reproductive fitness.

=== Sexual cannibalism ===
In nursery web spiders, females are known to frequently engage in sexual cannibalism. While sexual cannibalism is assumed to grant a greater chance at reproductive success for both spiders, with better fit and larger offspring, P. mira males can most likely obtain greater reproductive success by avoiding sexual cannibalism and ensuring survival themselves. More specifically, the use of silk veils was found to often grant higher fertilization success, as it interfered with the female's tactile and chemical receptors. Upon being trapped in the silk veil, the female P. mira shows increased movement in order to free themselves, and the attempts at sexual cannibalism may continue regardless of the veil.

== Interaction with humans ==
Pisaurina mira, as one of the most common spiders found in eastern United States, is well integrated in human lives. While the venom of P. mira is lethal to its prey, it is not effective against larger targets and is thus very unlikely to be medically significant for humans.

=== Agricultural impact ===
Because the vast majority of nursery web spiders' diet consists of insects found on fields and other cultivation sites for crops, they inevitably have an effect on the population of bugs and pests who feed on those crops and share the same habitats. The seasonal fluctuation of prey population affects the seasonal fluctuation of the P. mira population as well. For example, the highest population level of tarnished plant bugs, a prevalent pest for crops in the United States, was marked in October and June. The eggs of P. mira hatch in May, and the immature spiderlings are dispersed from nursery webs in June. Mature males are most collected in May and June. Thus, the interconnectedness of the population of these two species largely influence the crop yield. However, because P. mira's diet as a carnivore is rather diverse, a decline in the population of one prey does not hold much significance, as P. mira is able to hunt for other available insects.

== Contribution to the ecosystem ==
P. mira contributes to the increase of carbon storage by reducing grasshopper herbivory. The presence of P. mira alters the dietary habits of grasshoppers, which consequently increases the carbon storage by allowing the plants to take over a larger area for photosynthesis as they can conserve the resources that were once reserved for self-protection. They are also known to consume tarnished plant bugs, a pest that holds economic significance on many crops in the United States, mostly for small fruits and vegetables.
