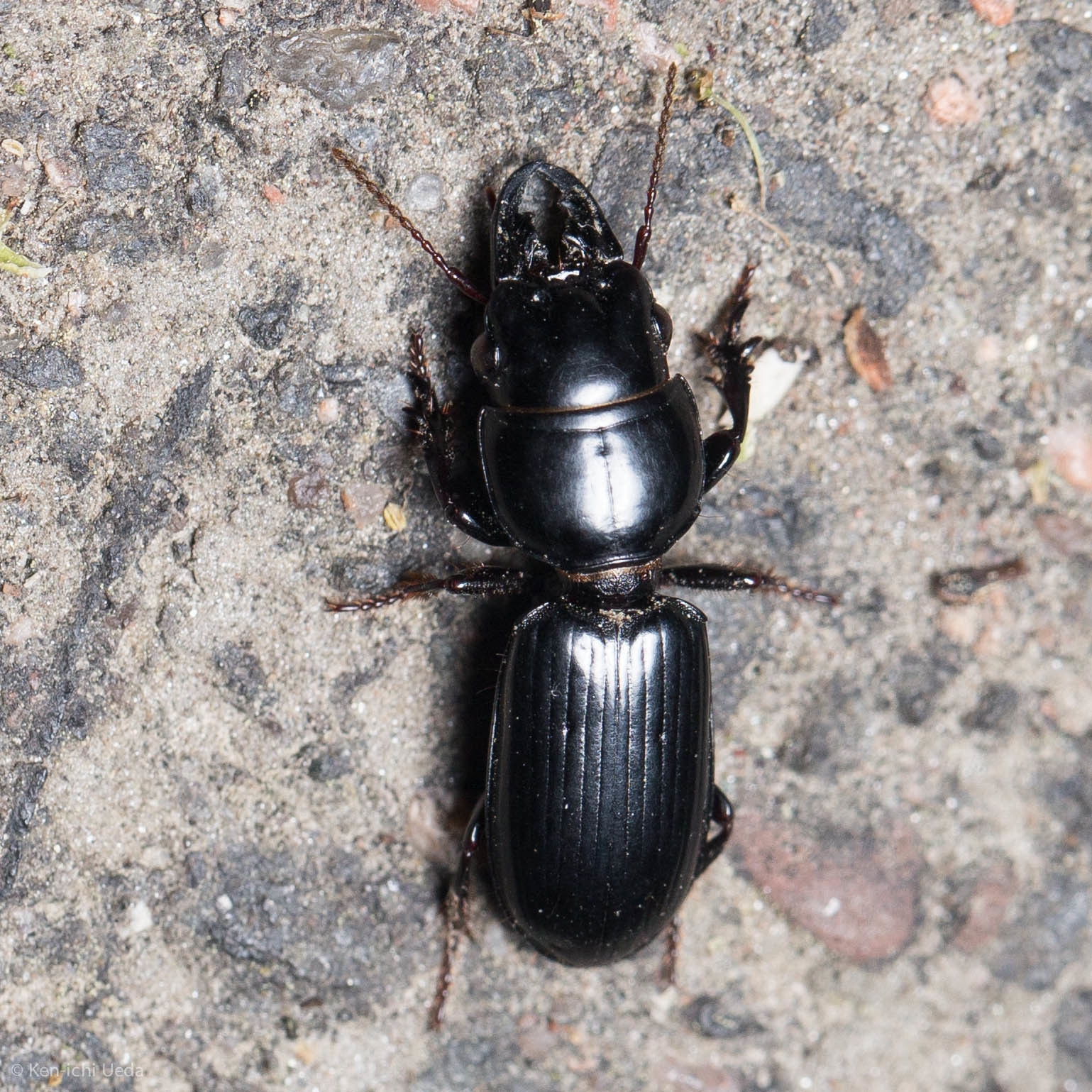

Scientific classification
- Domain: Eukaryota
- Kingdom: Animalia
- Phylum: Arthropoda
- Class: Insecta
- Order: Coleoptera
- Suborder: Adephaga
- Family: Carabidae
- Genus: Scarites
- Species: S. quadriceps

Binomial name
- Scarites quadriceps Chaudoir, 1843

= Scarites quadriceps =

Species of beetle

Scarites quadriceps is a species of ground beetle in the family Carabidae. It is found in North America. It can be found beneath debris on the edges of fields or beaches.
