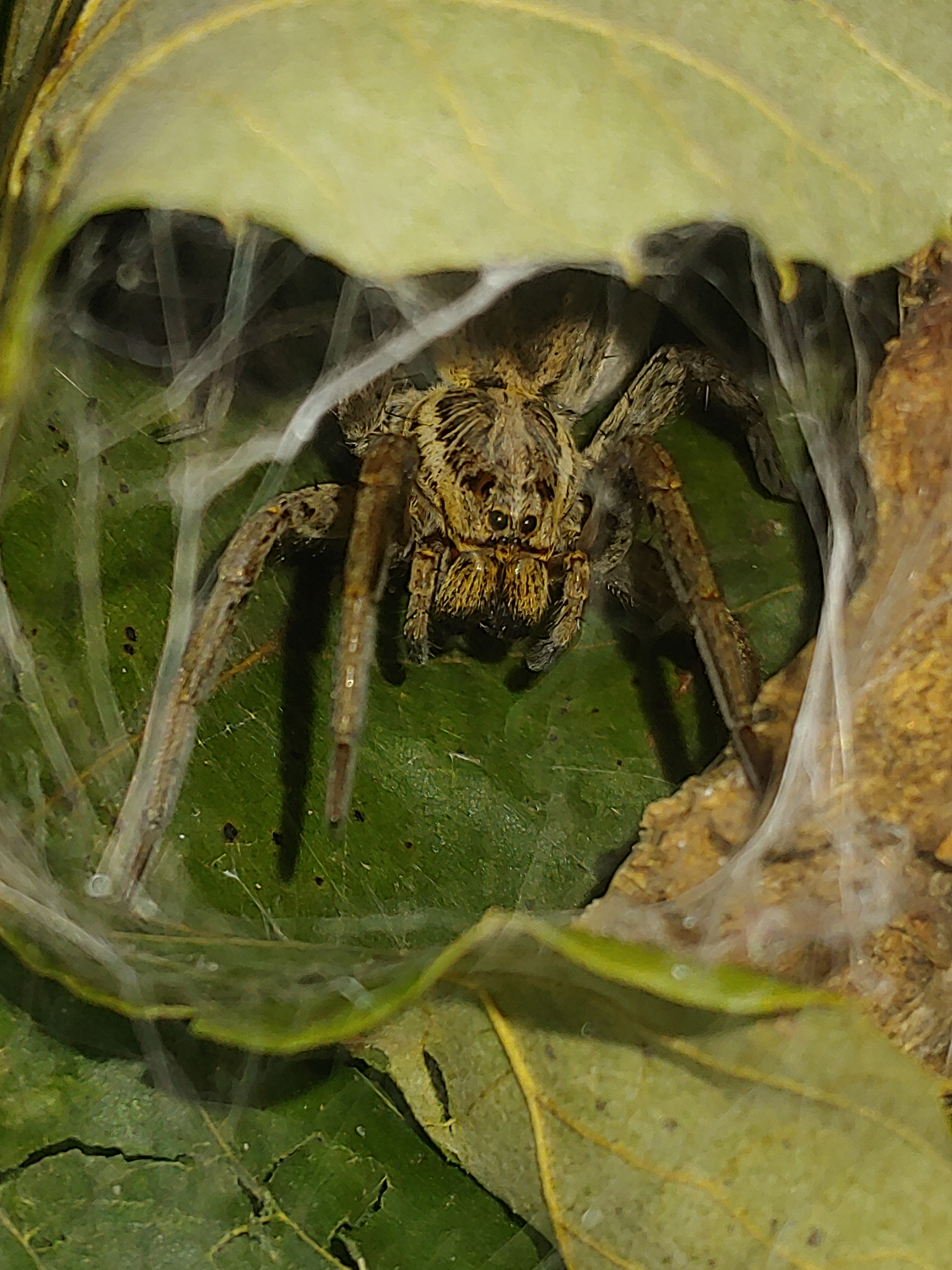

Conservation status
- Data Deficient (IUCN 3.1)

Scientific classification
- Kingdom: Animalia
- Phylum: Arthropoda
- Subphylum: Chelicerata
- Class: Arachnida
- Order: Araneae
- Infraorder: Araneomorphae
- Family: Lycosidae
- Genus: Hogna
- Species: H. radiata

Binomial name
- Hogna radiata (Latreille, 1817)

Subspecies
- Hogna radiata clara (Franganillo, 1913) — Spain; Hogna radiata minor (Simon, 1876) — Mediterranean

= Hogna radiata =

Species of spider

Hogna radiata is a species of wolf spider present in South Europe (from the middle of France), the Balkans, north Africa, and Central Asia (N. I. Platnick). This species is wandering, hunting smaller insects less than 20% of its own size. Found on grass, parks, and forests.

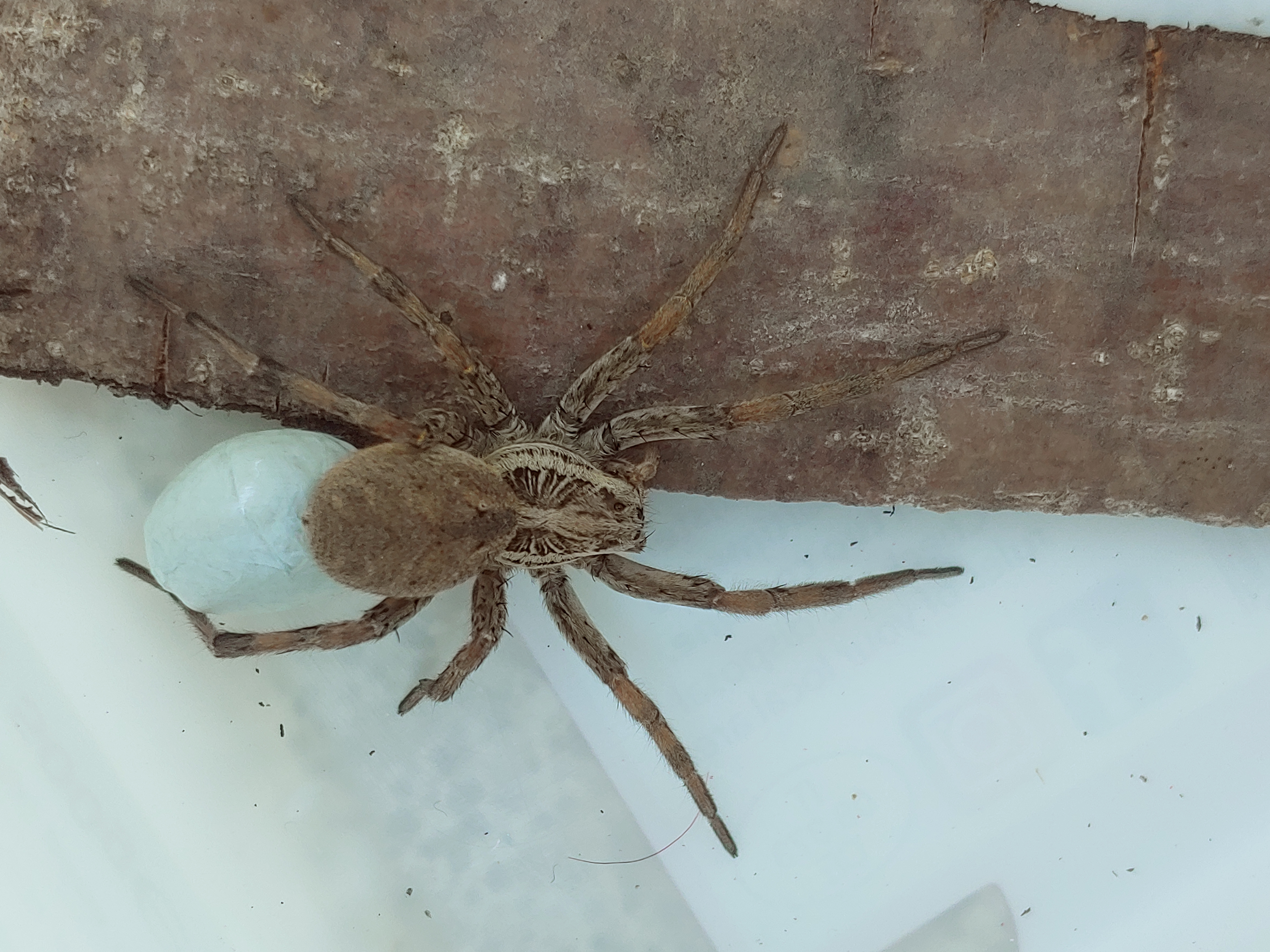
Hogna radiata female with eggsac

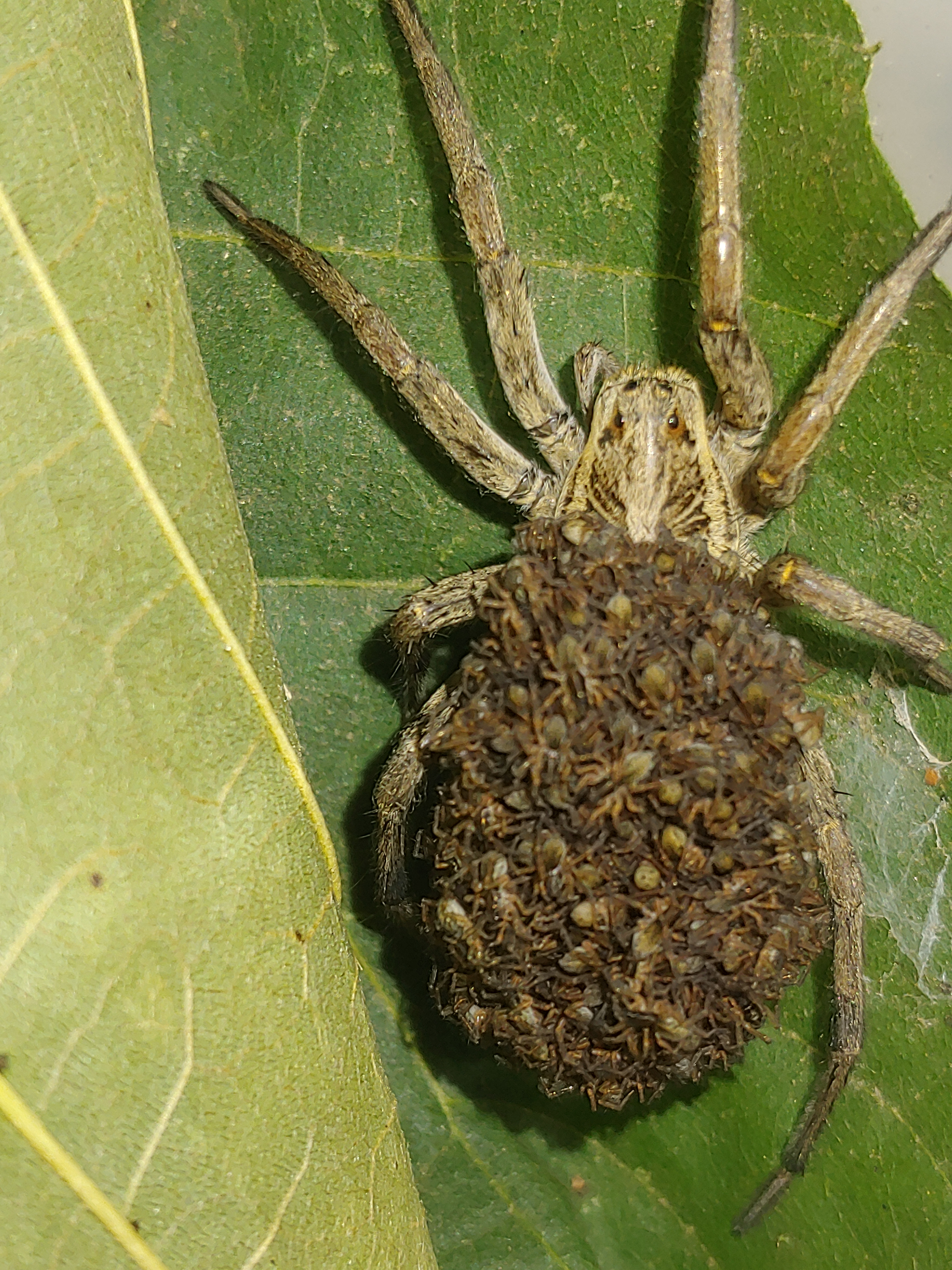
female hogna radiata carrying her young on her back

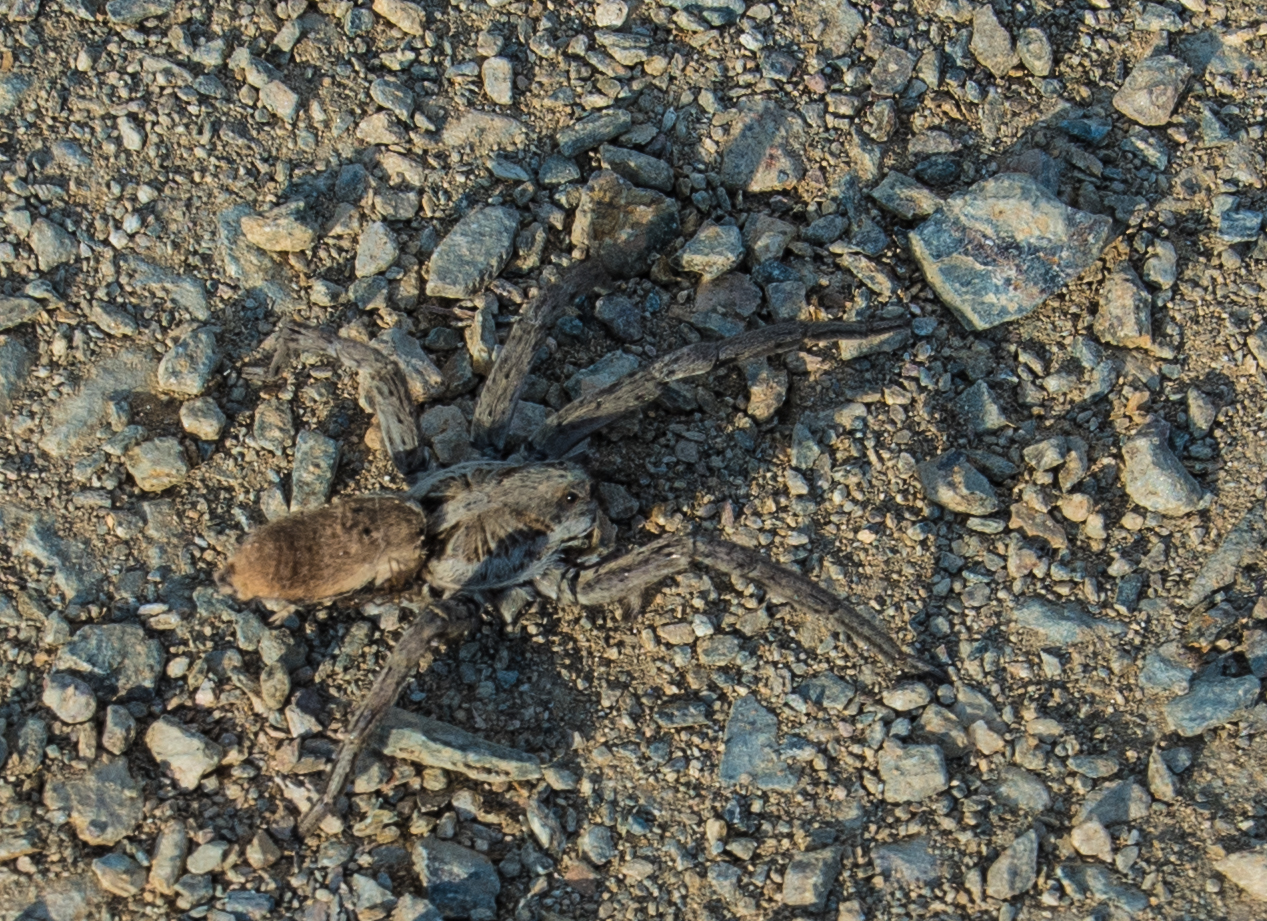
Triple amputated individual, on a trail in Roquebrun, Hérault, France at Haut-Languedoc Regional Natural Park.

== Sources ==
- (fr) n°1
- (fr) n°2
- (pt) n⁰3
