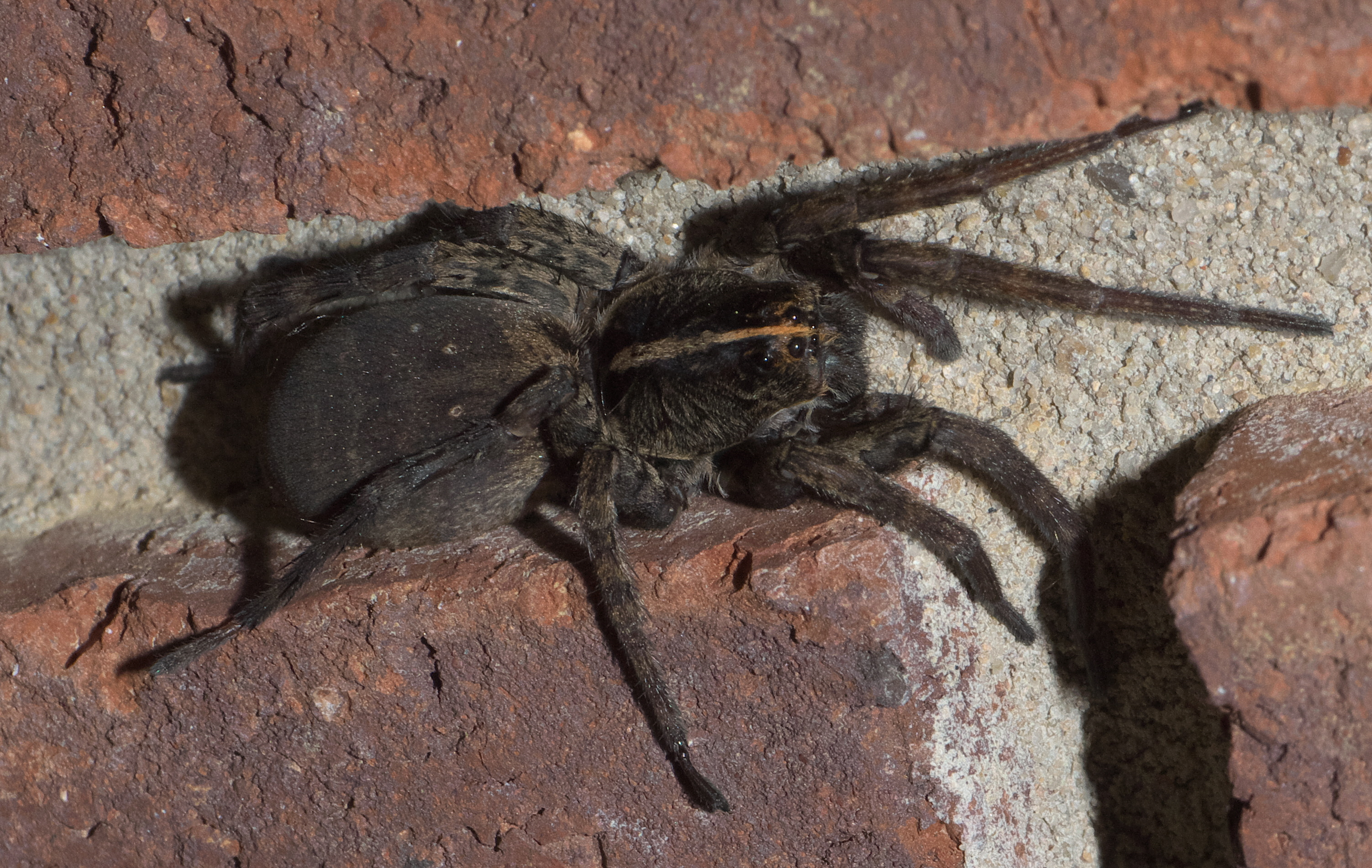

Scientific classification
- Kingdom: Animalia
- Phylum: Arthropoda
- Subphylum: Chelicerata
- Class: Arachnida
- Order: Araneae
- Infraorder: Araneomorphae
- Family: Lycosidae
- Genus: Tigrosa
- Species: T. grandis

Binomial name
- Tigrosa grandis (Banks, 1894)

= Tigrosa grandis =

Species of spider

Tigrosa grandis is a species of wolf spider (Lycosidae) endemic to the United States, where it occurs from Montana, east to Missouri, and south to Texas.
