= Tigrosa georgicola =

Scientific classification
- Kingdom: Animalia
- Phylum: Arthropoda
- Subphylum: Chelicerata
- Class: Arachnida
- Order: Araneae
- Infraorder: Araneomorphae
- Family: Lycosidae
- Genus: Tigrosa
- Species: T. georgicola

Binomial name
- Tigrosa georgicola (Walckenaer, 1837)

Species of spider

Tigrosa georgicola is a species of wolf spider in the family Lycosidae. It is endemic to the Southeastern United States. The type specimen was collected in Burke County, Georgia. Its habitat includes the forest floor of deciduous woodlands.
