= Trichoncyboides =

Scientific classification
- Kingdom: Animalia
- Phylum: Arthropoda
- Subphylum: Chelicerata
- Class: Arachnida
- Order: Araneae
- Infraorder: Araneomorphae
- Family: Linyphiidae
- Genus: Trichoncyboides; Wunderlich, 2008
- Species: T. simoni

Binomial name
- Trichoncyboides simoni (Lessert, 1904)

Genus of spiders

Trichoncyboides is a monotypic genus of sheet weavers containing the single species, Trichoncyboides simoni. It was first described by J. Wunderlich in 2008, and is found in Europe, Germany, Switzerland, and Czechia.
