= Zenonina =

Scientific classification
- Kingdom: Animalia
- Phylum: Arthropoda
- Subphylum: Chelicerata
- Class: Arachnida
- Order: Araneae
- Infraorder: Araneomorphae
- Family: Lycosidae
- Genus: Zenonina; Simon

Species
- 6, see text

Genus of spiders

Zenonina is a genus of African spiders in the family Lycosidae with six described species. It was first described in 1898 by Eugène Simon.

== Description ==
Females measure 6-7 mm in total length, males 5-6 mm. Members of this genus are recognized by the different shape of the carapace and abdomen. They lack the typical lycosid bands on the carapace and abdomen.

The carapace is round with the eye region narrowed and bearing strong setae. On the thoracic region, the carapace has a strong indentation where the abdomen fits in. The abdomen has a triangular shape.

The legs are strong and the femur and tibiae of the front legs bear strong setae.

== Species ==
As of October 2025, this genus includes six species:

- Zenonina albocaudata Lawrence, 1952 – South Africa
- Zenonina fusca Caporiacco, 1941 – Ethiopia
- Zenonina mystacina Simon, 1898 – Namibia, South Africa
- Zenonina rehfousi Lessert, 1933 – Angola
- Zenonina squamulata Strand, 1908 – Ethiopia
- Zenonina vestita Simon, 1898 – Ethiopia (type species)
