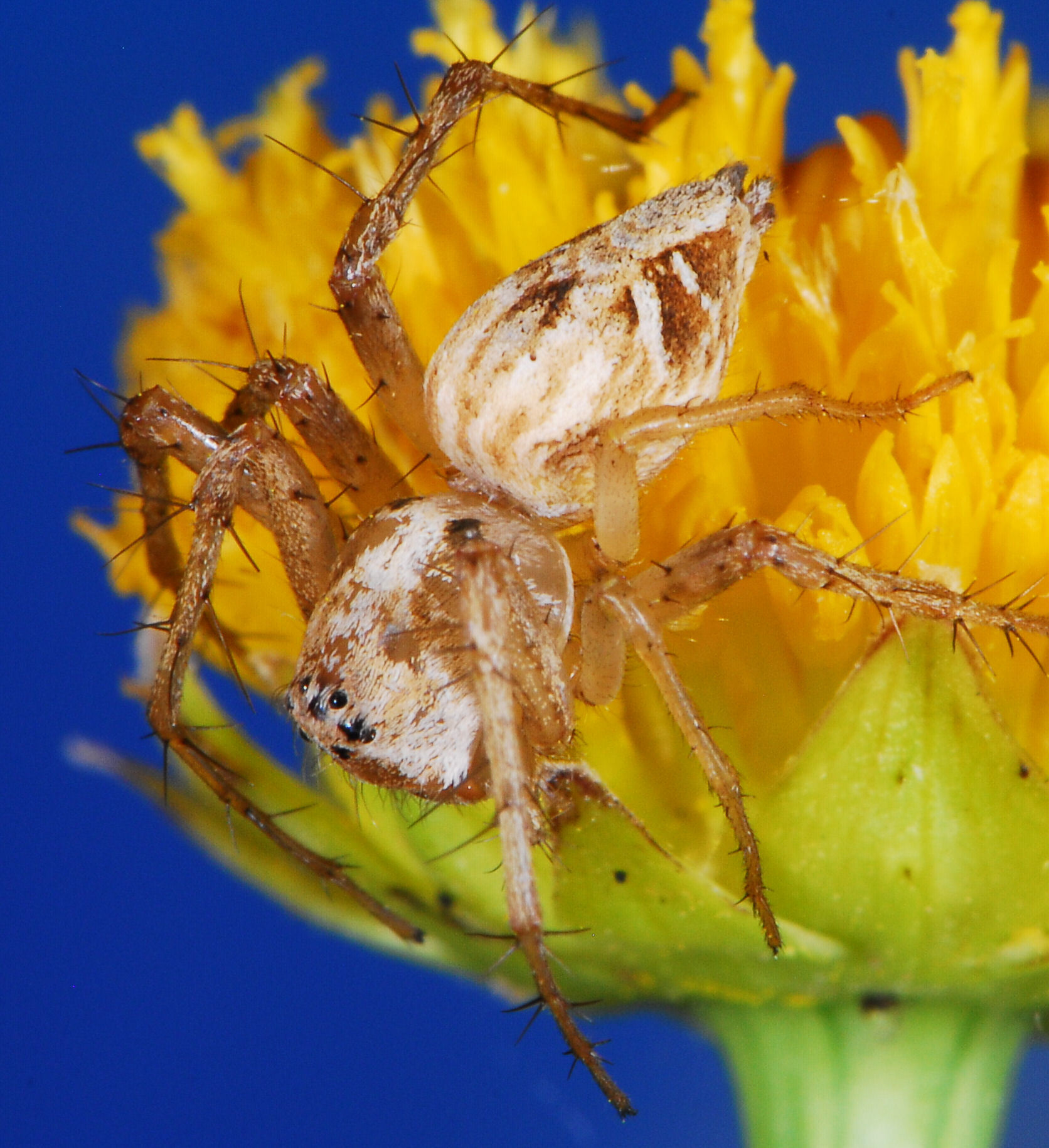
- female
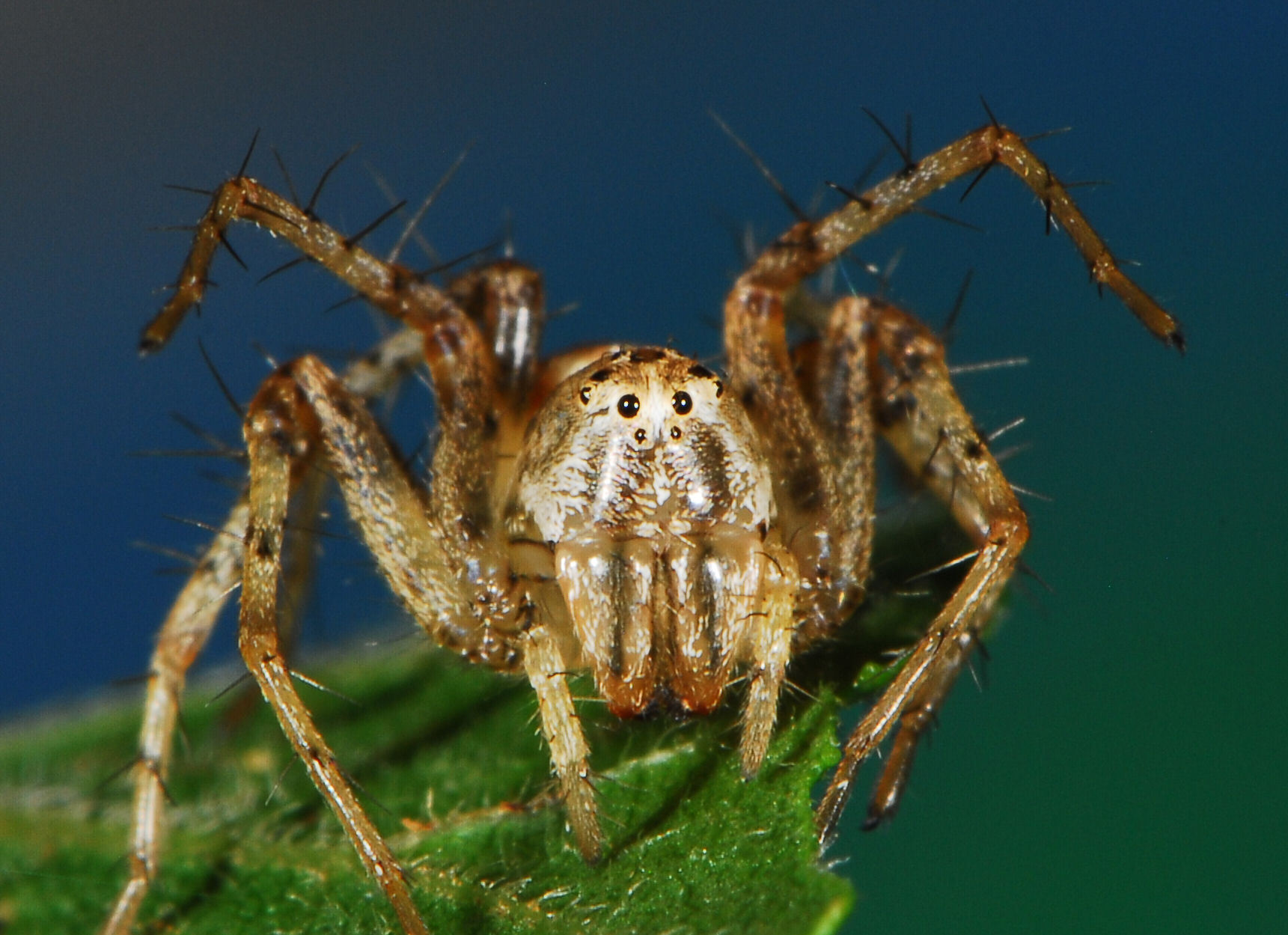
- female

Scientific classification
- Kingdom: Animalia
- Phylum: Arthropoda
- Subphylum: Chelicerata
- Class: Arachnida
- Order: Araneae
- Infraorder: Araneomorphae
- Family: Oxyopidae
- Genus: Oxyopes
- Species: O. bothai

Binomial name
- Oxyopes bothai Lessert, 1915

= Oxyopes bothai =

Botha's Lynx Spider

Species of spider

Oxyopes bothai is a species of spider in the family Oxyopidae. It is commonly known as Botha's lynx spider.

== Distribution ==
Oxyopes bothai occurs in Ethiopia, Tanzania, and South Africa. In South Africa, the species is widely distributed across all provinces at altitudes ranging from 16 to 1,698 m above sea level.

== Habitat and ecology ==
The species is commonly found on grasses across multiple biomes including Fynbos, Forest, Grassland, Savanna, Nama Karoo, and Thicket biomes. It has also been sampled from pistachio orchards, demonstrating its adaptability to agricultural environments.

== Description ==
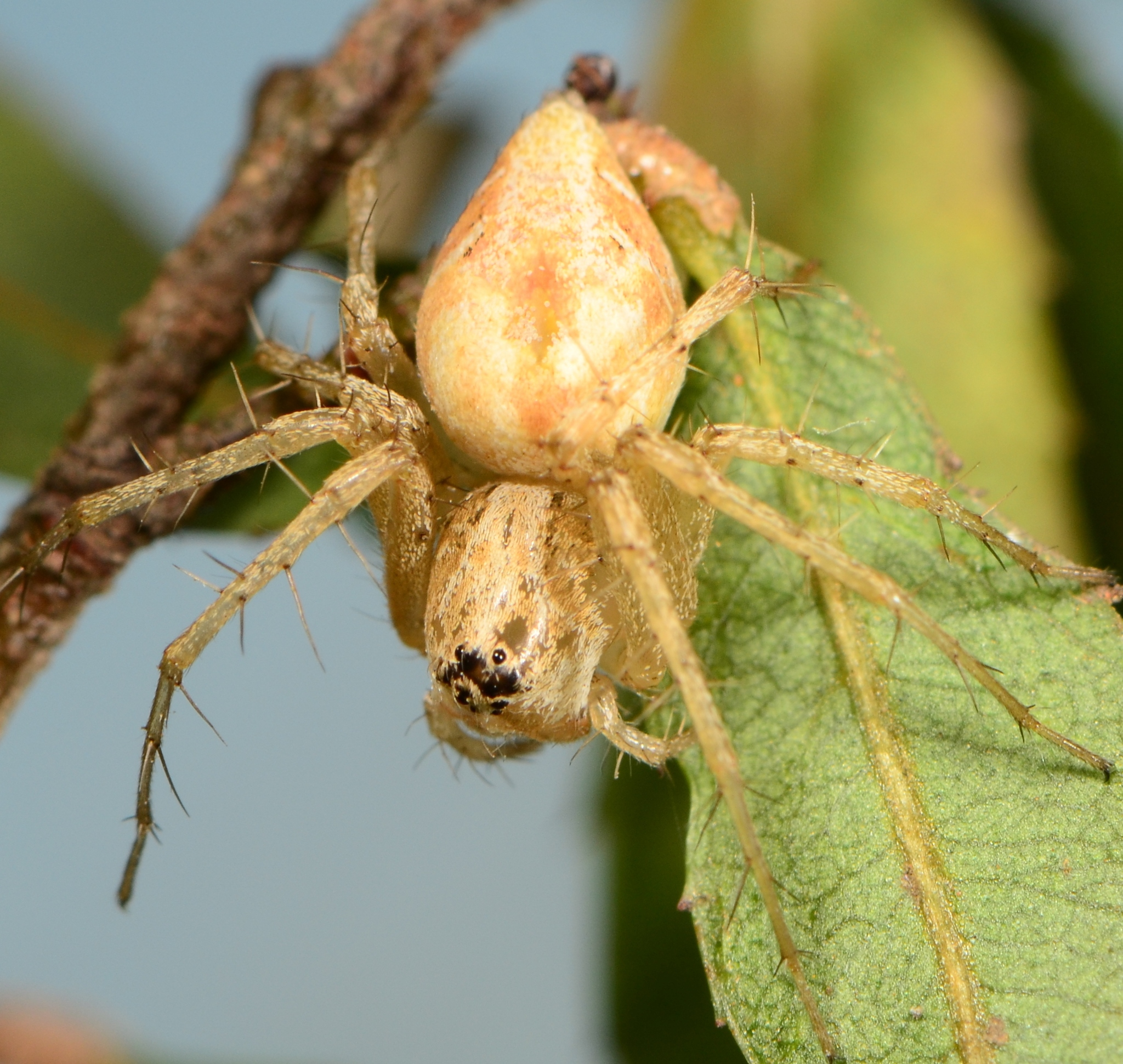
female

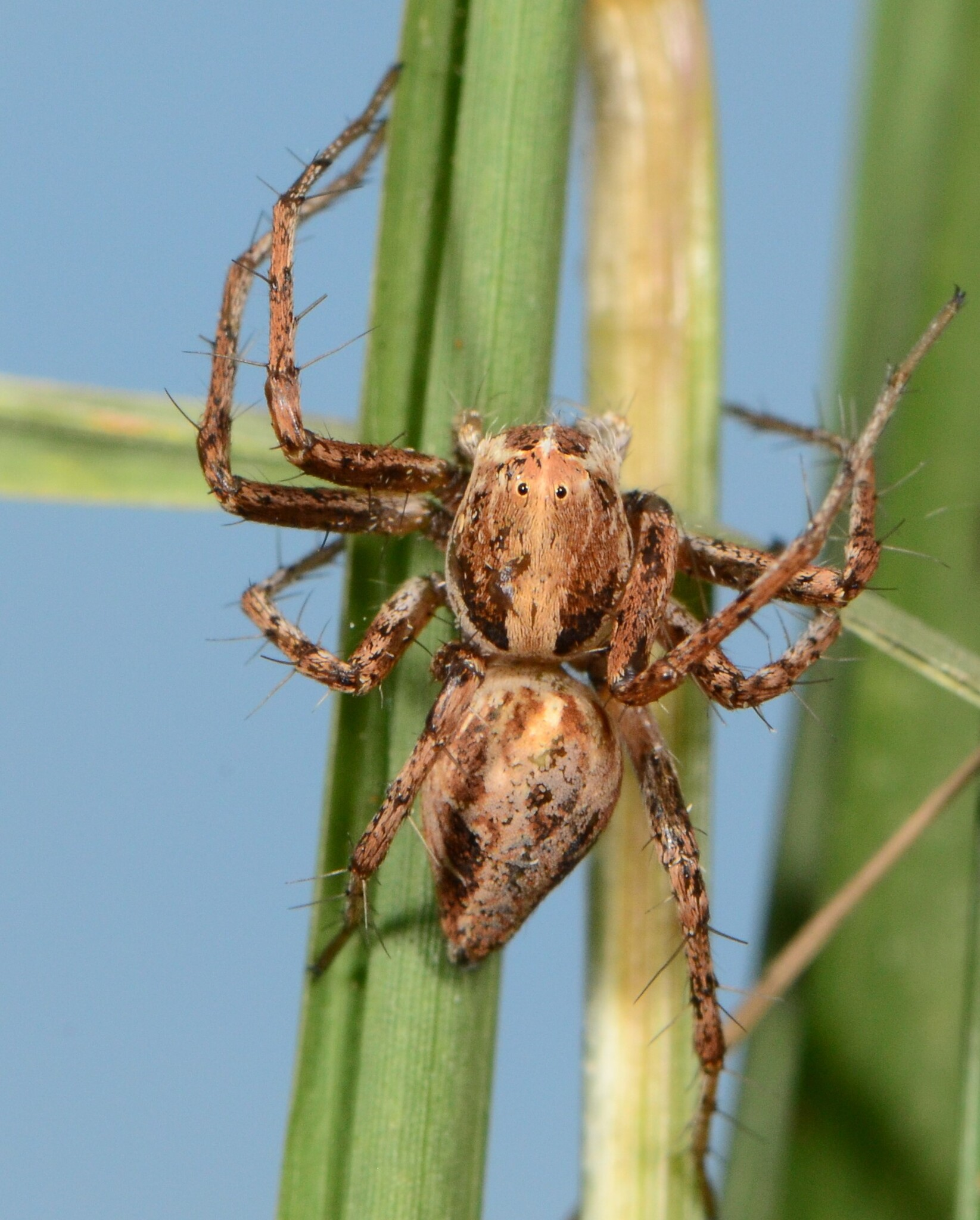
female

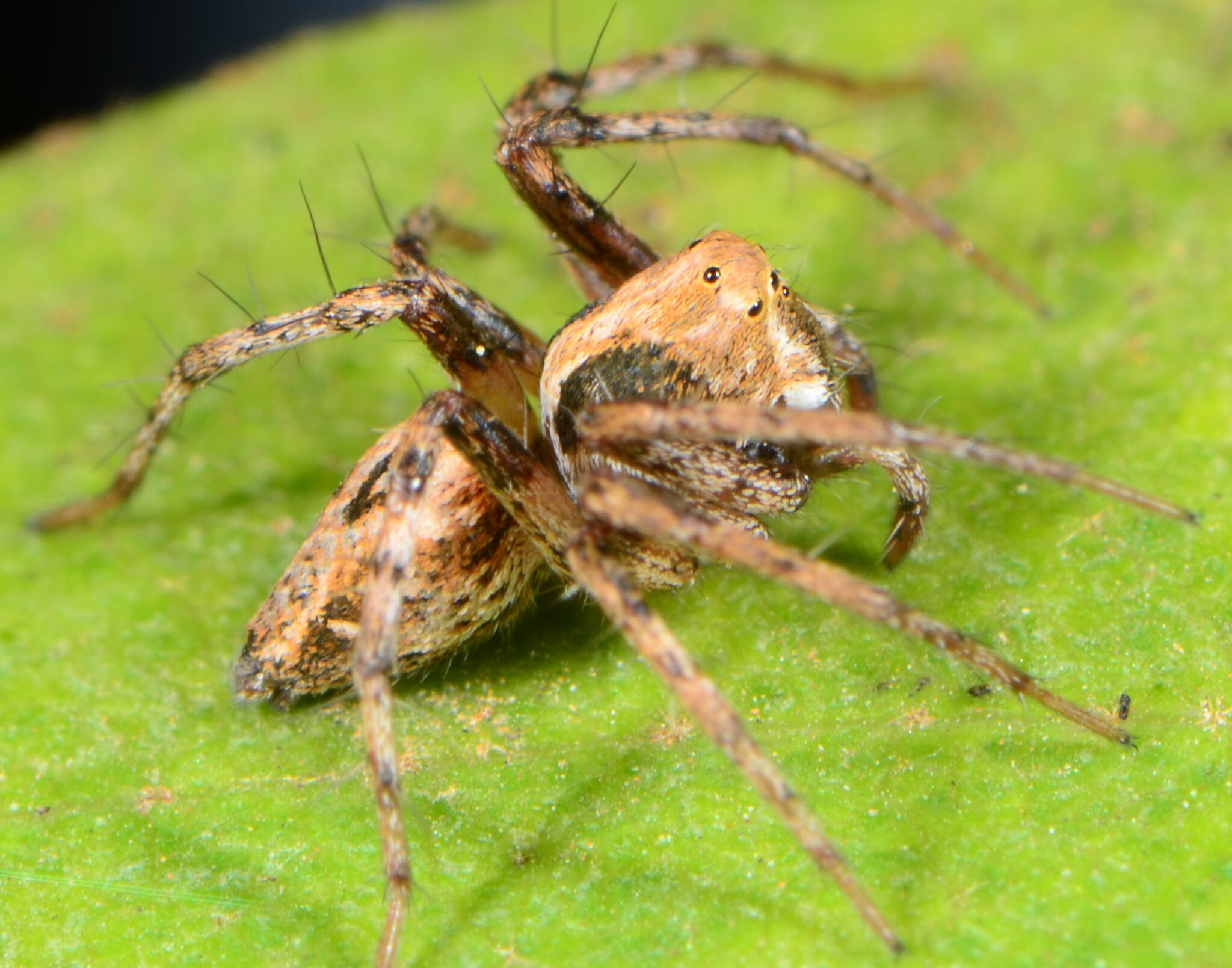
female

Oxyopes bothai is known only from females. The species displays the typical lynx spider morphology with long, slender legs bearing prominent spines and a characteristic tapering opisthosoma.

== Conservation ==
Oxyopes bothai is listed as Least Concern by the South African National Biodiversity Institute due to its wide geographical range across multiple provinces. The species is protected in more than ten protected areas and faces no significant threats.
