= Euprosthenops proximus =

Tanzania Euprosthenops Nursery-Web Spider

Scientific classification
- Kingdom: Animalia
- Phylum: Arthropoda
- Subphylum: Chelicerata
- Class: Arachnida
- Order: Araneae
- Infraorder: Araneomorphae
- Family: Pisauridae
- Genus: Euprosthenops
- Species: E. proximus

Binomial name
- Euprosthenops proximus Lessert, 1916

Synonyms
- Euprosthenops hartmanni Roewer, 1955

Species of spider

Euprosthenops proximus is a species of spider in the family Pisauridae. It is found across several African countries and is commonly known as the Tanzania Euprosthenops nursery-web spider.

== Distribution ==
Euprosthenops proximus has a wide distribution across Africa. It is found in Angola, the Democratic Republic of the Congo, Ethiopia, Ivory Coast, Rwanda, Tanzania, and South Africa. In South Africa, it has been recorded from four provinces at altitudes ranging from 51 to 1,251 m above sea level.

== Habitat and ecology ==
Funnel-web pisaurids construct their webs in short shrubs and bushes close to the ground or in trees. Large webs are made in vegetation with a funnel at the bottom. The capture web is sheet-like and composed of dense criss-crossing threads. The species has been sampled from the Grassland and Savanna biomes.

A study of spiders inhabiting abandoned mammal burrows at Nylsvley in South Africa found that Euprosthenops proximus builds a web over those of other spider species, attaching it to grass surrounding the burrow. The web is hammock-shaped and the spider sits in the middle waiting for prey. When disturbed, the spider runs over the web and escapes into the burrow.

== Conservation ==
Euprosthenops proximus is listed as Least Concern by the South African National Biodiversity Institute due to its wide geographical range. There are no significant threats to the species, and it is protected in Kalkfontein Dam Nature Reserve, Kosi Bay Nature Reserve, and Ophathe Game Reserve.

== Taxonomy ==
The species was originally described by Roger de Lessert in 1916 from Tanzania. It was revised by Blandin in 1976, who synonymized Euprosthenops hartmanni Roewer, 1955 with this species. It is known from both sexes.
