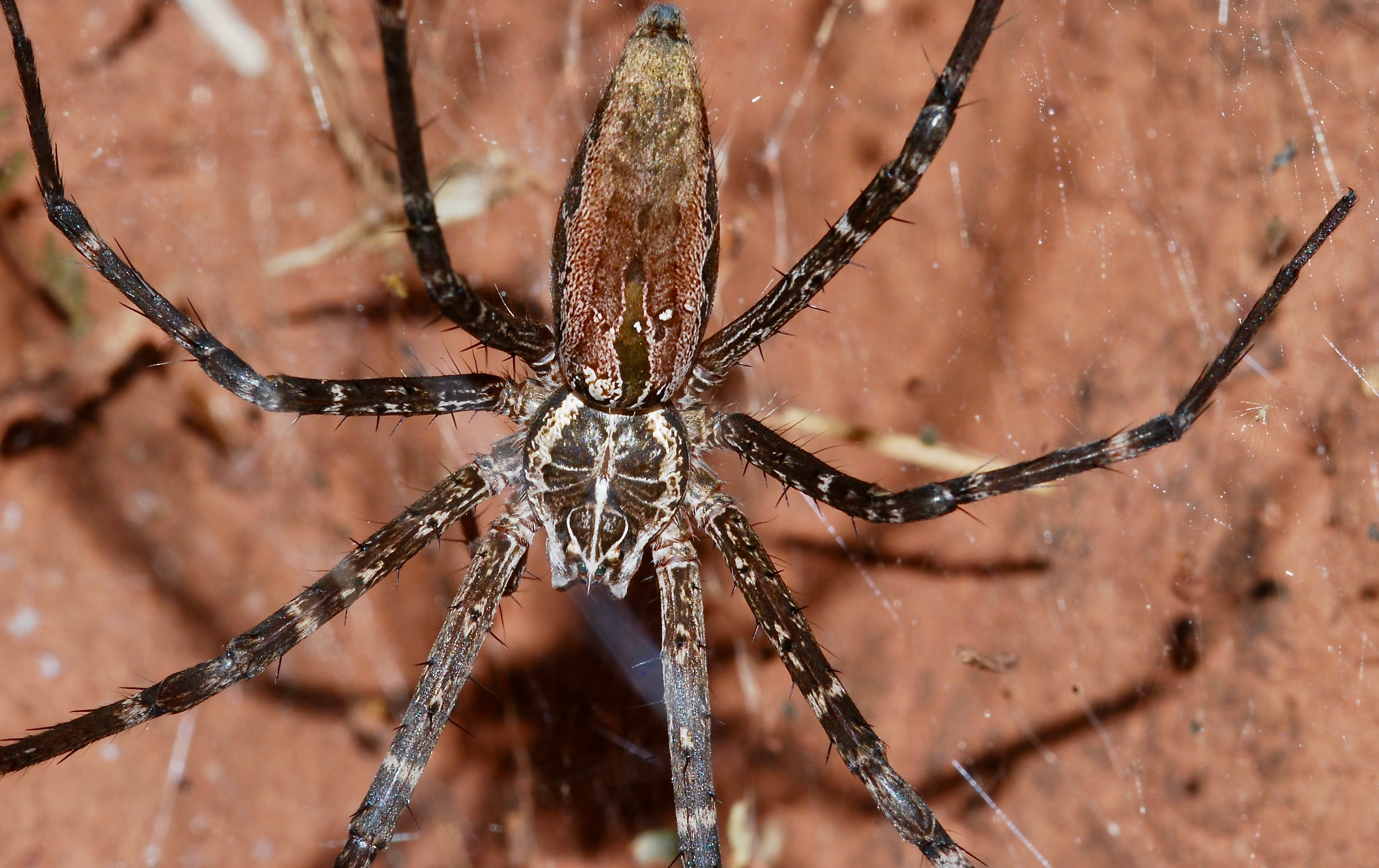
- E. bayaonianus
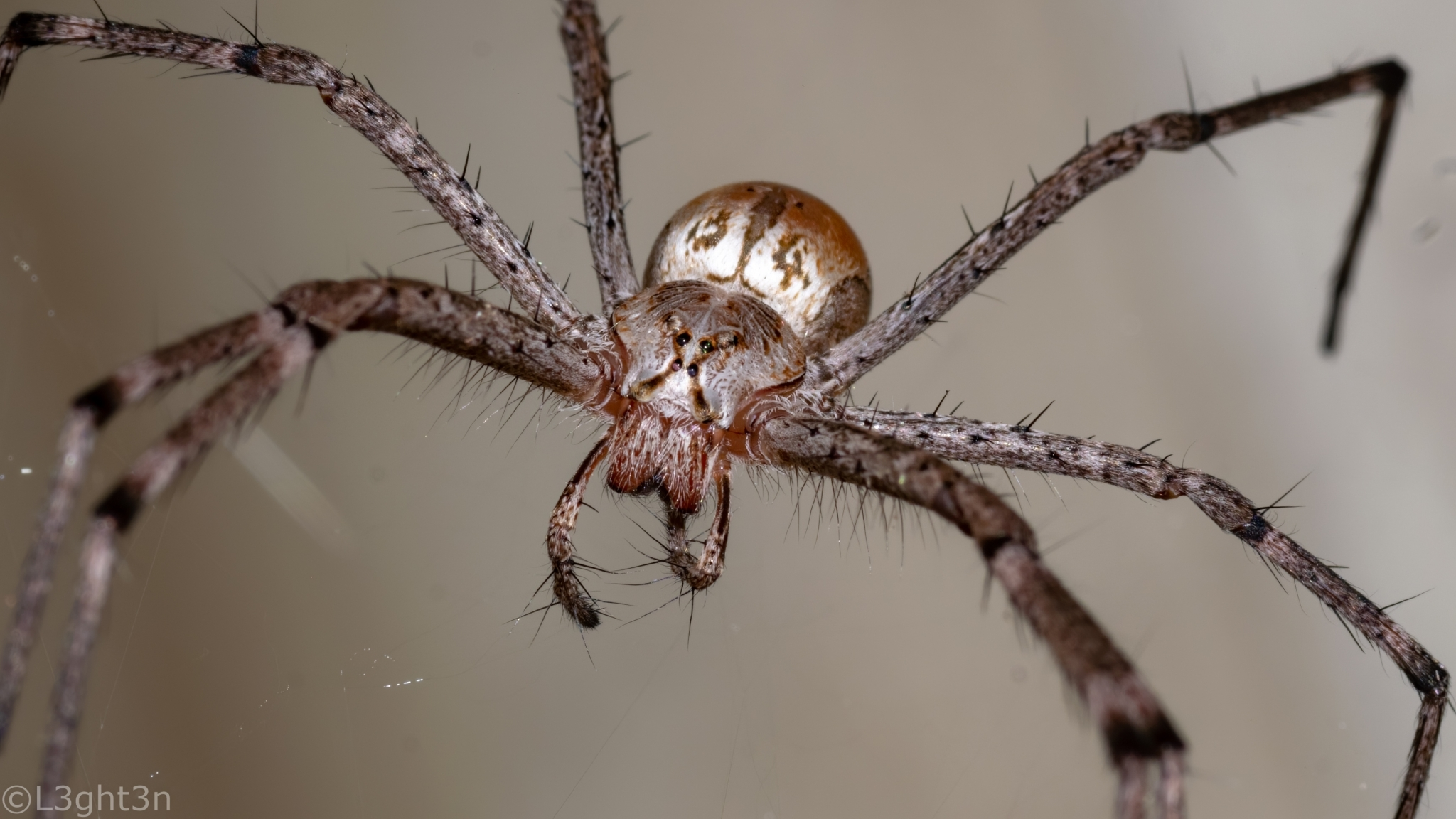
- E. australis

Scientific classification
- Kingdom: Animalia
- Phylum: Arthropoda
- Subphylum: Chelicerata
- Class: Arachnida
- Order: Araneae
- Infraorder: Araneomorphae
- Family: Pisauridae
- Genus: Euprosthenops; Pocock, 1897

Type species
- E. bayaonianus (Brito Capello, 1867)

Species
- 9, see text

Synonyms
- Euprosthenomma Roewer, 1955; Podophthalma Brito Capello, 1867

= Euprosthenops =

Genus of spiders

Euprosthenops is a genus of nursery web spiders that was first described by Reginald Innes Pocock in 1897. Its species are found in Africa, India, Pakistan and Israel.

== Distribution ==
Spiders in this genus are found from South Africa to Rwanda and Ivory Coast, with two species found outside Africa, in Israel, Pakistan and India.

== Life style ==
They make large webs in vegetation with funnel at bottom. Euprosthenops moves under the web. The female carries the egg sac below the body and builds a nursery-web when spiderlings emerge.

== Description ==
In Euprosthenops, the carapace is longer than wide. The eyes are arranged in four rows. The clypeus has a blunt projection on which the anterior lateral eyes are situated. The diameter of the anterior median eyes is smaller than that of the anterior lateral eyes. The median ocular quadrangle is longer than or as long as its posterior width.

The chelicerae have four posterior teeth. The abdomen is elongate and tapers to the back. The legs have spines on the femur, tibia and metatarsi, while the patellae have one spine dorso-apically. All legs have three claws.

== Taxonomy ==
The genus Euprosthenops was described by Pocock in 1897. It has been revised by Blandin (1976), with notes on some species by Silva and Sierwald (2014).

== Species ==
As of October 2025, this genus includes ten species and one subspecies:

- Euprosthenops australis Simon, 1898 – Senegal, Nigeria, DR Congo, Zambia, Namibia, Zimbabwe, Botswana, South Africa
- Euprosthenops bayaonianus (Brito Capello, 1867) – Sierra Leone, Ivory Coast, Ghana, DR Congo, Kenya, Zambia, Mozambique, South Africa (type species)
- Euprosthenops benoiti Blandin, 1976 – Rwanda
- Euprosthenops biguttatus Roewer, 1955 – DR Congo, Namibia
- Euprosthenops ellioti (O. Pickard-Cambridge, 1877) – Pakistan, India
- Euprosthenops insperatus Zonstein & Marusik, 2021 – Israel
- Euprosthenops pavesii Lessert, 1928 – Central, East Africa
- Euprosthenops proximus Lessert, 1916 – Ivory Coast, Ethiopia, DR Congo, Rwanda, Tanzania, Angola, South Africa
  - E. p. maximus Blandin, 1976 – Ivory Coast
- Euprosthenops schenkeli (Roewer, 1955) – East Africa
- Euprosthenops wuehlischi Roewer, 1955 – Namibia
