= Pronophaea vidua =

Midlands Pronophaea dark sac spider

Conservation status
- Least Concern (SANBI Red List)

Scientific classification
- Kingdom: Animalia
- Phylum: Arthropoda
- Subphylum: Chelicerata
- Class: Arachnida
- Order: Araneae
- Infraorder: Araneomorphae
- Family: Corinnidae
- Genus: Pronophaea
- Species: P. vidua

Binomial name
- Pronophaea vidua (Lessert, 1923)

Species of spider

Pronophaea vidua is a spider species in the family Corinnidae. It is commonly known as the Midlands Pronophaea dark sac spider.

== Distribution ==
Pronophaea vidua is endemic to South Africa, where it is known from KwaZulu-Natal Province at two localities Kranzkloof Nature Reserve and Ngome State Forest.

== Habitat and ecology ==
This species consists of free-living ground dwellers that have been sampled from the Grassland and Savanna biomes at altitudes ranging from 344 to 1,002 m above sea level.

== Conservation ==
Pronophaea vidua is listed as Least Concern by the South African National Biodiversity Institute despite its limited range.

== Taxonomy ==
The species was originally described by Roger de Lessert in 1923 as Medmassa vidua from Krantzkloof, KwaZulu-Natal. Haddad & Bosselaers (2010) illustrated the female, but the male has not yet been described.
