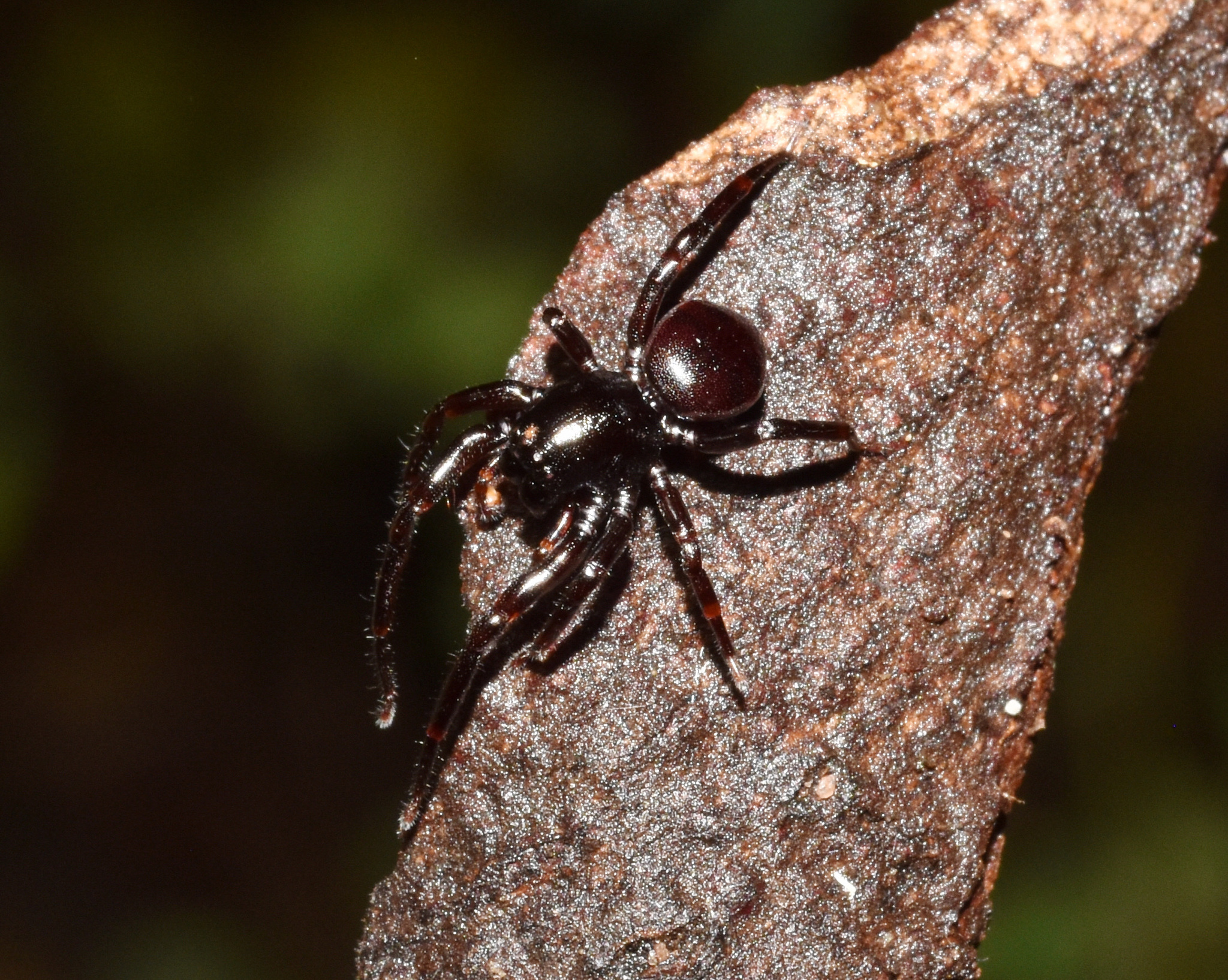
- P. natalica
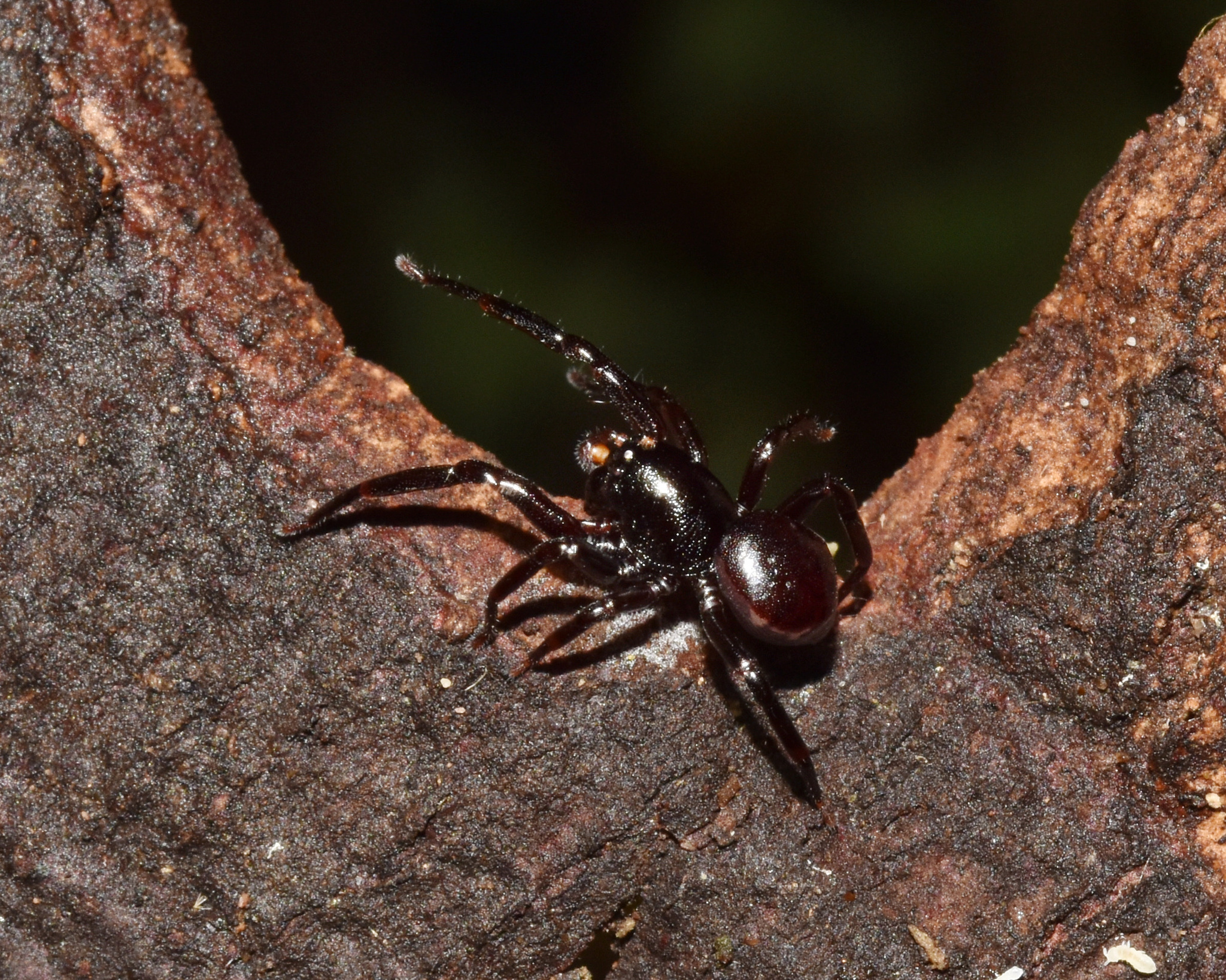
- P. natalica

Scientific classification
- Kingdom: Animalia
- Phylum: Arthropoda
- Subphylum: Chelicerata
- Class: Arachnida
- Order: Araneae
- Infraorder: Araneomorphae
- Family: Corinnidae
- Genus: Pronophaea; Simon, 1897

Type species
- P. natalica Simon, 1897

Species
- see text

= Pronophaea =

Genus of spiders

Pronophaea is a genus of African corinnid sac spiders first described by Eugène Simon in 1897. As of September 2025 it contains only three species, all found in South Africa.

== Species ==
- Pronophaea natalica Simon, 1897
- Pronophaea proxima (Lessert, 1923)
- Pronophaea vidua (Lessert, 1923)
