= Pronophaea proxima =

Zebra Pronophaea dark sac spider

Conservation status
- Least Concern (SANBI Red List)

Scientific classification
- Kingdom: Animalia
- Phylum: Arthropoda
- Subphylum: Chelicerata
- Class: Arachnida
- Order: Araneae
- Infraorder: Araneomorphae
- Family: Corinnidae
- Genus: Pronophaea
- Species: P. proxima

Binomial name
- Pronophaea proxima (Lessert, 1923)

Species of spider

Pronophaea proxima is a spider species in the family Corinnidae. It is commonly known as the Zebra Pronophaea dark sac spider.

== Distribution ==
Pronophaea proxima is endemic to South Africa, where it is known from four provinces: Eastern Cape, Western Cape, Limpopo and KwaZulu-Natal.

== Habitat and ecology ==
This species consists of free-living ground-dwellers that have been sampled from the Grassland and Savanna biomes at altitudes ranging from 19 to 1,097 m above sea level.

== Conservation ==
Pronophaea proxima is listed as Least Concern by the South African National Biodiversity Institute due to its wide geographical range. The species is protected in two protected areas, Groeneweide Forest Station and Nylsvley Nature Reserve. There are no known threats to the species.

== Taxonomy ==
The species was originally described by Roger de Lessert in 1923 as Medmassa proxima from Krantzkloof, KwaZulu-Natal. Haddad & Bosselaers (2010) illustrated the male, but the female has not yet been described.
