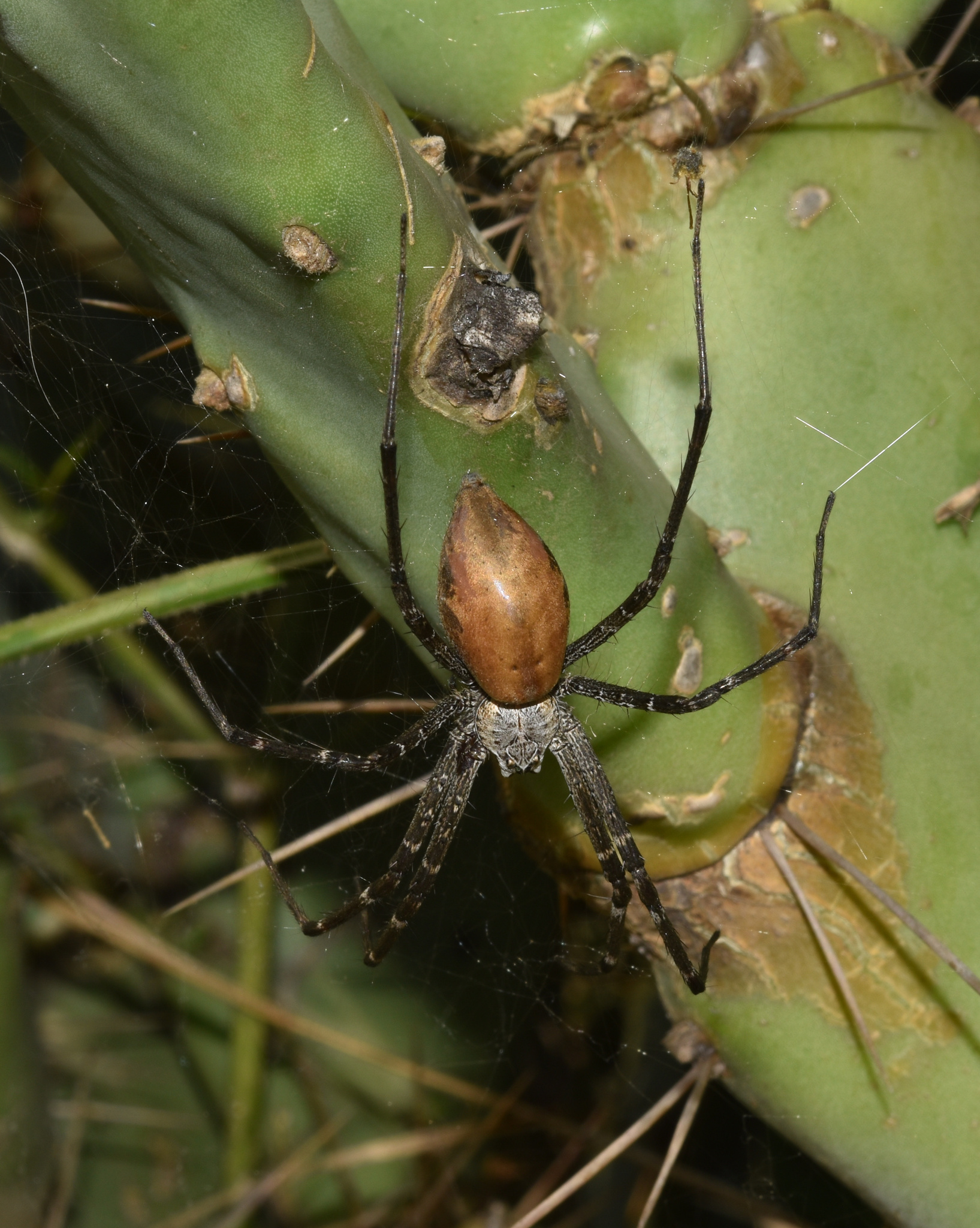

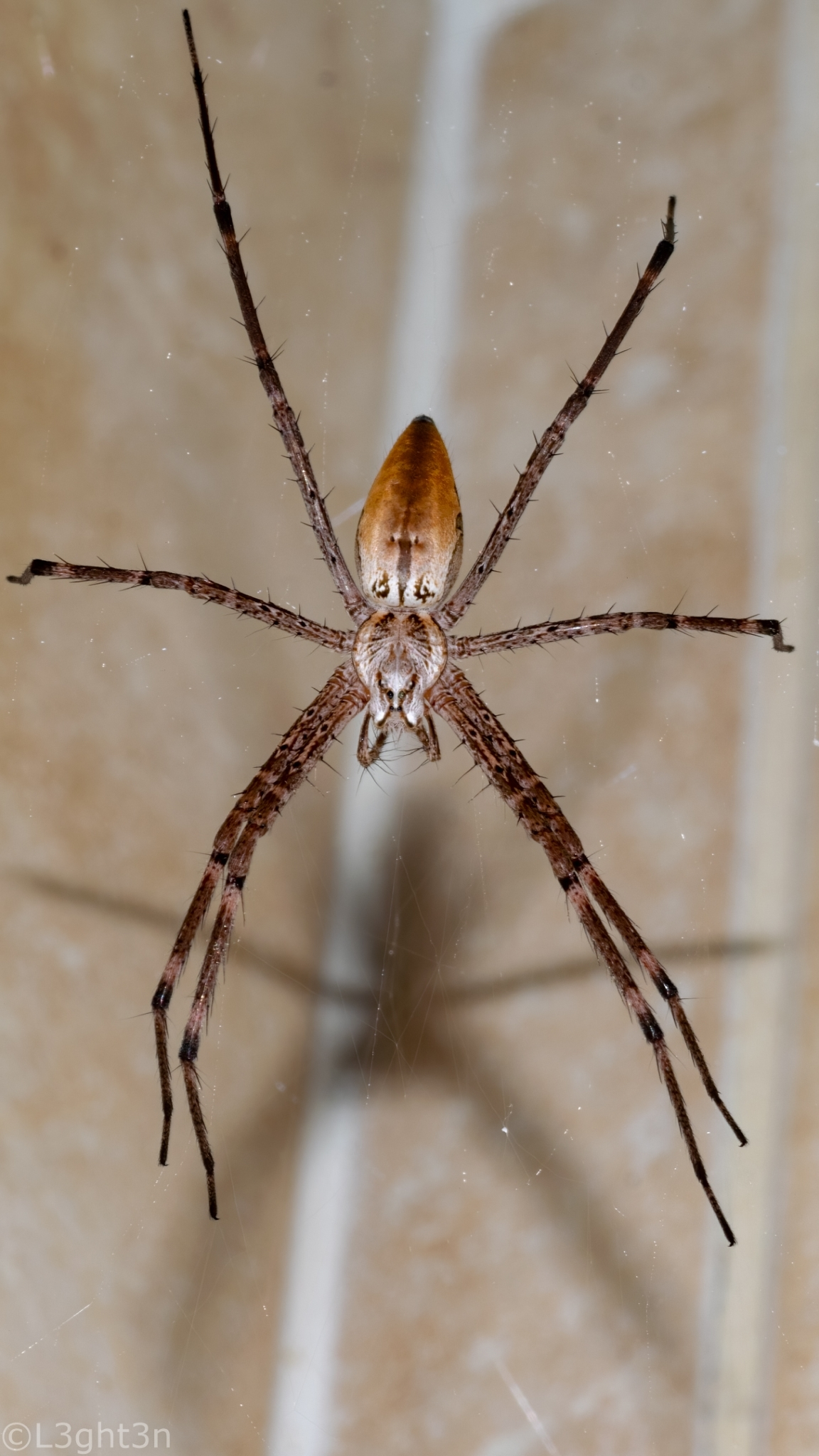

Scientific classification
- Kingdom: Animalia
- Phylum: Arthropoda
- Subphylum: Chelicerata
- Class: Arachnida
- Order: Araneae
- Infraorder: Araneomorphae
- Family: Pisauridae
- Genus: Euprosthenops
- Species: E. australis

Binomial name
- Euprosthenops australis Simon, 1898

Synonyms
- Podophthalma bayaoniana Karsch, 1878

= Euprosthenops australis =

African Euprosthenops Nursery-Web Spider

Species of spider

Euprosthenops australis is a species of spider in the family Pisauridae. It is found across several African countries and is commonly known as the African Euprosthenops nursery-web spider.

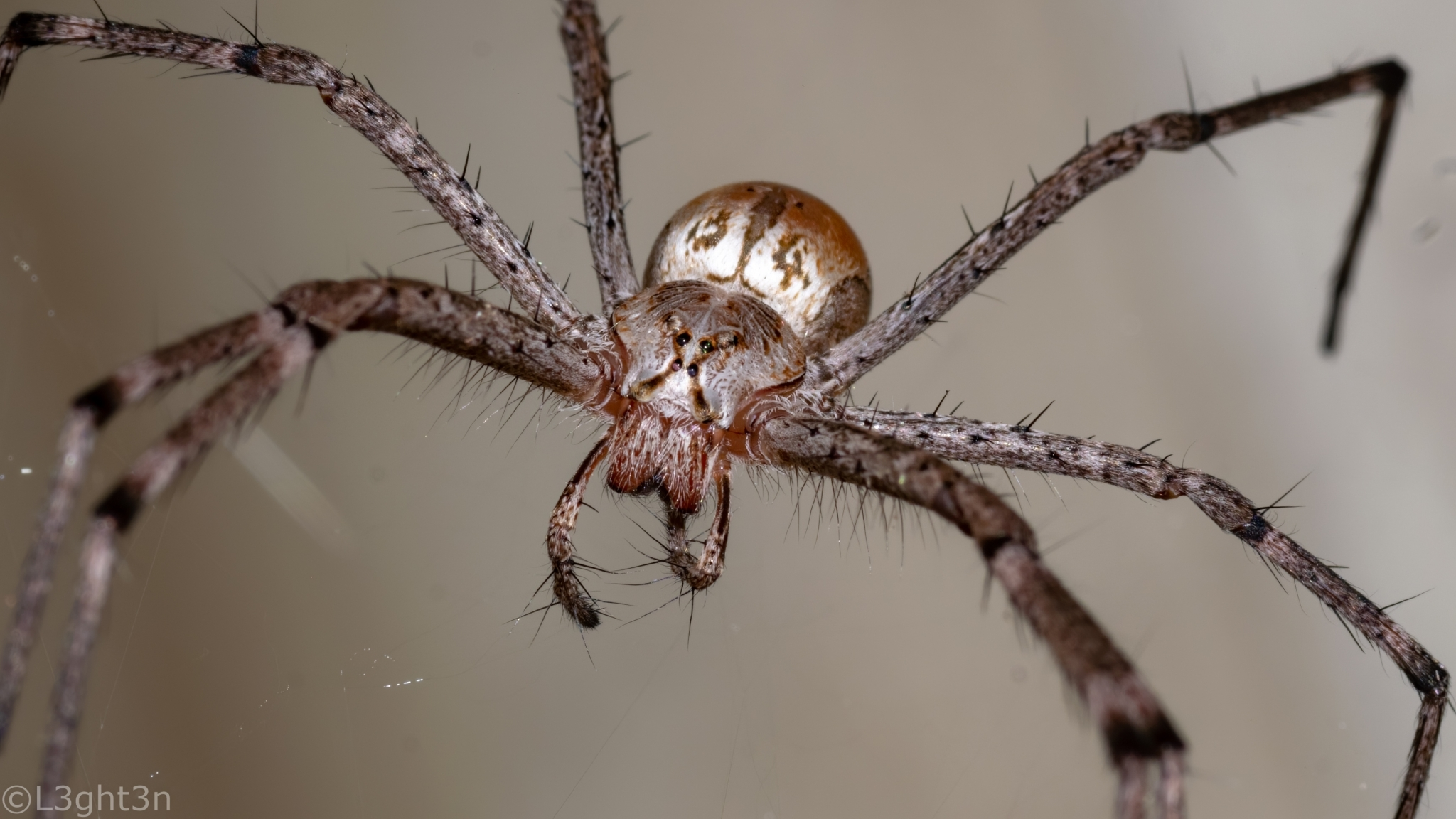

== Distribution ==
Euprosthenops australis has a wide distribution across Africa. It is found in the Democratic Republic of the Congo, Namibia, Nigeria, Zimbabwe, Zambia, Senegal, and South Africa. In South Africa, it has been recorded from eight provinces at altitudes ranging from 4 to 1,663 meters above sea level.

== Habitat and ecology ==
The species inhabits multiple biomes including Grassland, Savanna, and Thicket biomes. Funnel-web pisaurids construct their webs in short shrubs and bushes close to the ground, or make large webs in trees. The capture web is sheet-like and composed of dense criss-crossing threads with a funnel at the bottom. Euprosthenops australis moves under the web and the female carries the egg sac below the body, building a nursery-web when spiderlings emerge.

The species is sometimes found in houses, and care of the egg sac and spiderlings has been observed in the field.

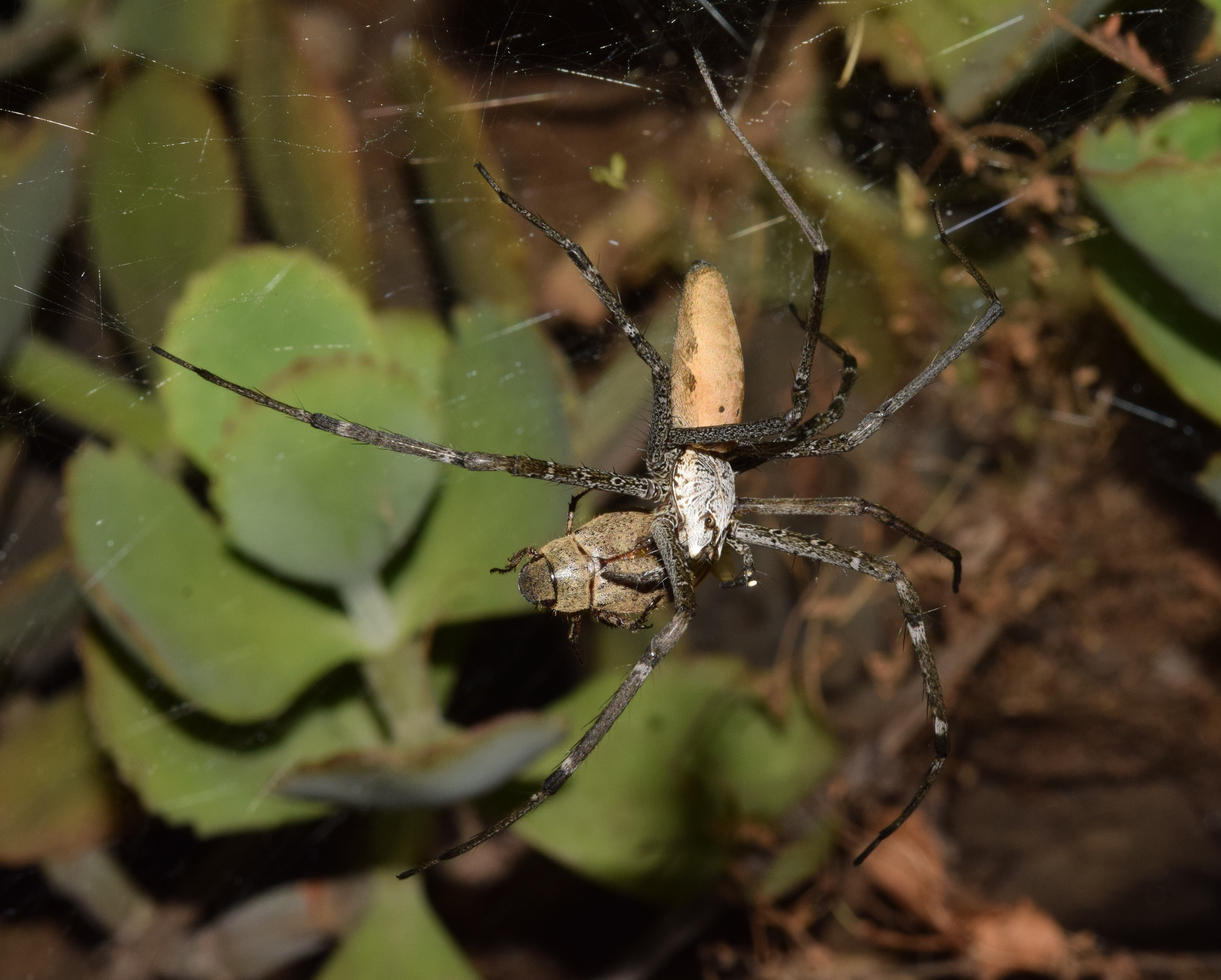
with beetle

== Conservation ==
Euprosthenops australis is listed as Least Concern by the South African National Biodiversity Institute due to its wide geographical range. There are no significant threats to the species, and it is protected in 11 protected areas.

== Etymology ==
The species name australis is Latin meaning "southern", referring to the species' southern African distribution.

== Taxonomy ==
The species was originally described by Eugène Simon in 1898. It was revised by Blandin in 1976, and the male was first described by Silva & Sierwald in 2014.
