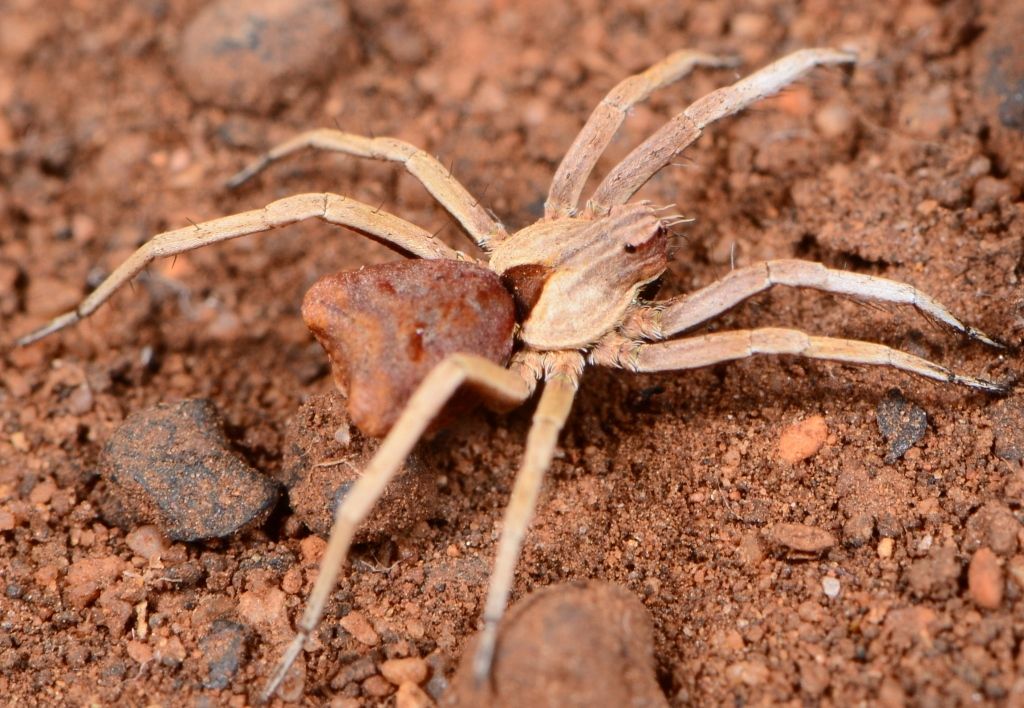
- Female
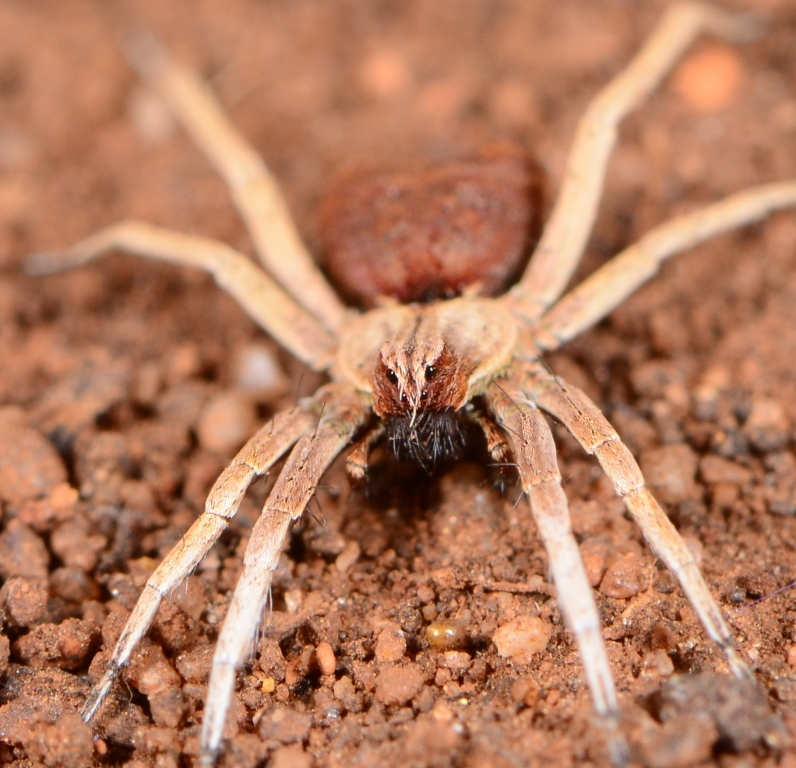
- Female

Scientific classification
- Kingdom: Animalia
- Phylum: Arthropoda
- Subphylum: Chelicerata
- Class: Arachnida
- Order: Araneae
- Infraorder: Araneomorphae
- Family: Lycosidae
- Genus: Zenonina
- Species: Z. albocaudata

Binomial name
- Zenonina albocaudata Lawrence, 1952

= Zenonina albocaudata =

Pietermaritzburg Zenonina wolf spider

Species of spider

Zenonina albocaudata is a species of spider in the family Lycosidae. It is endemic to South Africa and is commonly known as the Pietermaritzburg Zenonina wolf spider.

== Distribution ==
Zenonina albocaudata is found in South Africa, where it has been sampled from five provinces at altitudes ranging from 224 to 1699 m. Localities include Bloemfontein Botanical Gardens and several nature reserves in the Free State, Pretoria and Suikerbosrand Nature Reserve in Gauteng, uMkuze Game Reserve and Pietermaritzburg in KwaZulu-Natal, multiple sites in Limpopo including Polokwane Nature Reserve and Blouberg Nature Reserve, and George in the Western Cape.

== Habitat and ecology ==
Zenonina albocaudata is a free-running ground dweller sampled from the Fynbos, Grassland, and Savanna biomes.

== Description ==
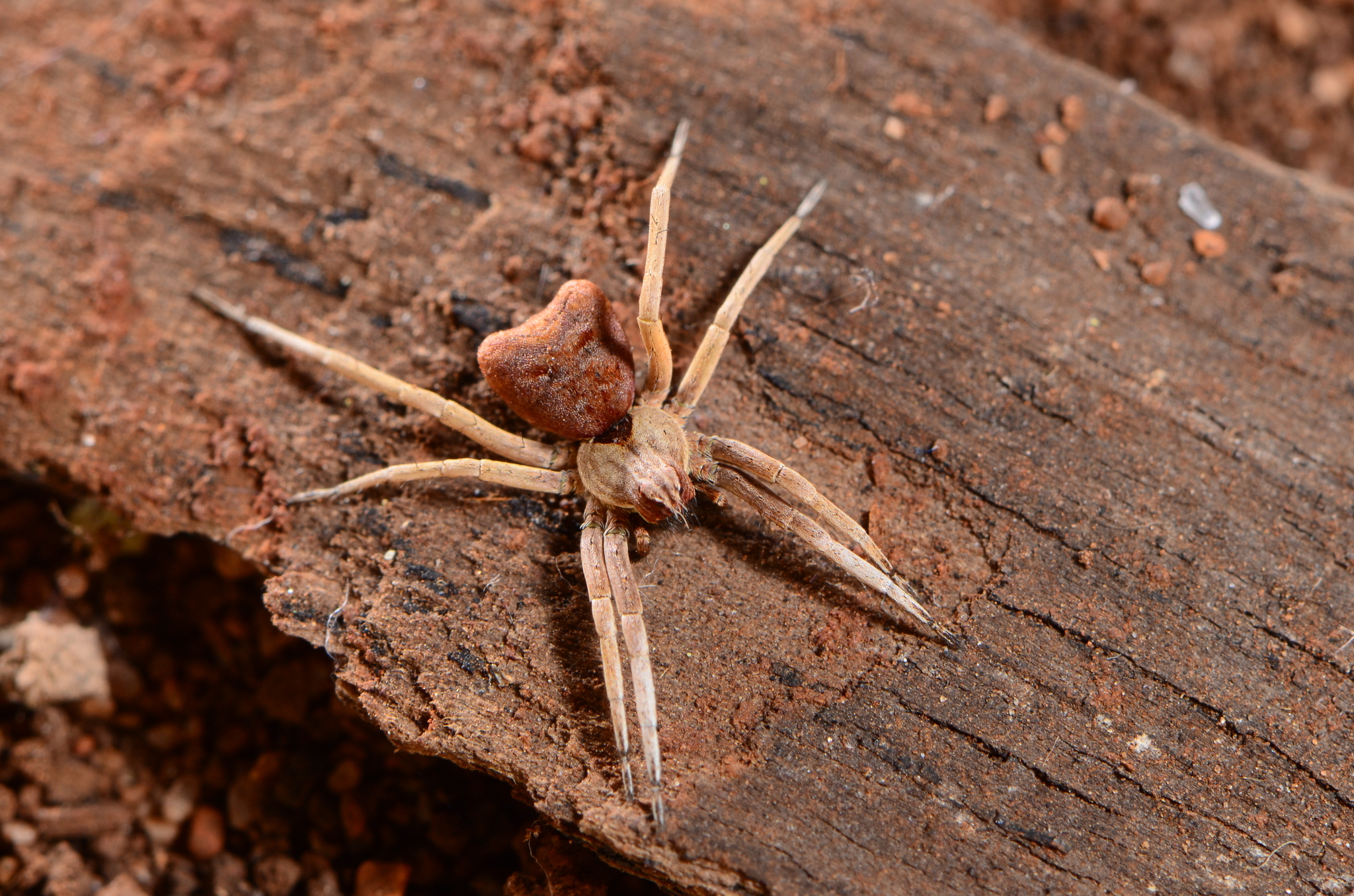

The carapace is brown with a narrow light marginal band at the sides. The cephalic region is dark brown, while the thoracic region posteriorly has a well-defined triangular blackish marking in the middle. The abdomen above is variegated blackish-brown with a quadrate marking just above the spinnerets composed of white hairs that contrast strongly with the rest of the dorsal surface. The sides are blackish. The ventral surface is brown and considerably lighter than the dorsum.

== Conservation ==
Zenonina albocaudata is listed as Least Concern by the South African National Biodiversity Institute due to its wide geographical range. It is protected in more than 8 protected areas.

== Taxonomy ==
Zenonina albocaudata was described by Lawrence in 1952 from Pietermaritzburg in KwaZulu-Natal. The species has not been revised and is known from both sexes.
