= Zenonina mystacina =

Bloemfontein Zenonina wolf spider

Scientific classification
- Kingdom: Animalia
- Phylum: Arthropoda
- Subphylum: Chelicerata
- Class: Arachnida
- Order: Araneae
- Infraorder: Araneomorphae
- Family: Lycosidae
- Genus: Zenonina
- Species: Z. mystacina

Binomial name
- Zenonina mystacina Simon, 1898

Species of spider

Zenonina mystacina is a species of spider in the family Lycosidae. It is found in southern Africa and is commonly known as the Bloemfontein Zenonina wolf spider.

== Distribution ==
Zenonina mystacina is found in Namibia and South Africa.

In South Africa, it has been sampled from seven provinces at altitudes ranging from 91 to 1531 m. Localities include Tsolwana Nature Reserve in the Eastern Cape, Bloemfontein and multiple nature reserves in the Free State, Tembe Elephant Park in KwaZulu-Natal, Kruger National Park and Lephalale in Limpopo, multiple sites in Mpumalanga, Benfontein Game Reserve in the Northern Cape, and Karoo National Park in the Western Cape.

== Habitat and ecology ==
Zenonina mystacina is a free-running ground dweller sampled from the Grassland, Nama Karoo, and Savanna biomes.

== Description ==
The cephalothorax is red-brown and covered with red-brown scale hairs. It is lighter behind and finely white-bordered. The head region has two thin whitish dots and is triangular pale yellow behind. The abdomen dorsally is brown with reddish brown scales and pale yellow scales on the posterior depressed median part. Ventrally it has pale yellow scales with a single pale yellow shade. The legs are pale yellow with all segments having dense white scales.

== Conservation ==
Zenonina mystacina is listed as Least Concern by the South African National Biodiversity Institute. Although the species is known only from the female, it has a wide geographical range. It is protected in more than 8 protected areas.

== Taxonomy ==
Zenonina mystacina was described by Simon in 1898 from Bloemfontein in the Free State. The species was reviewed by Roewer (1959) and is known only from the female.
