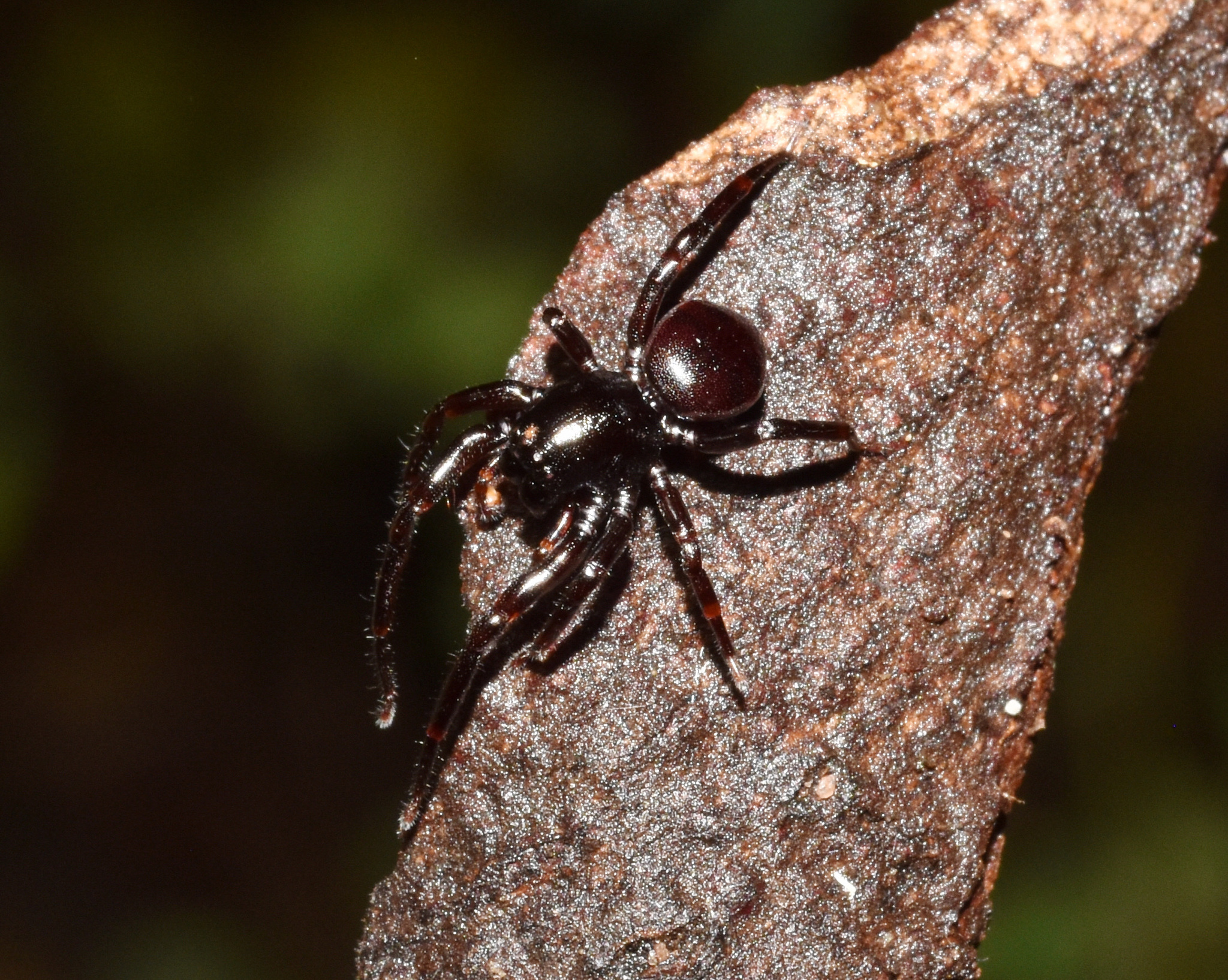

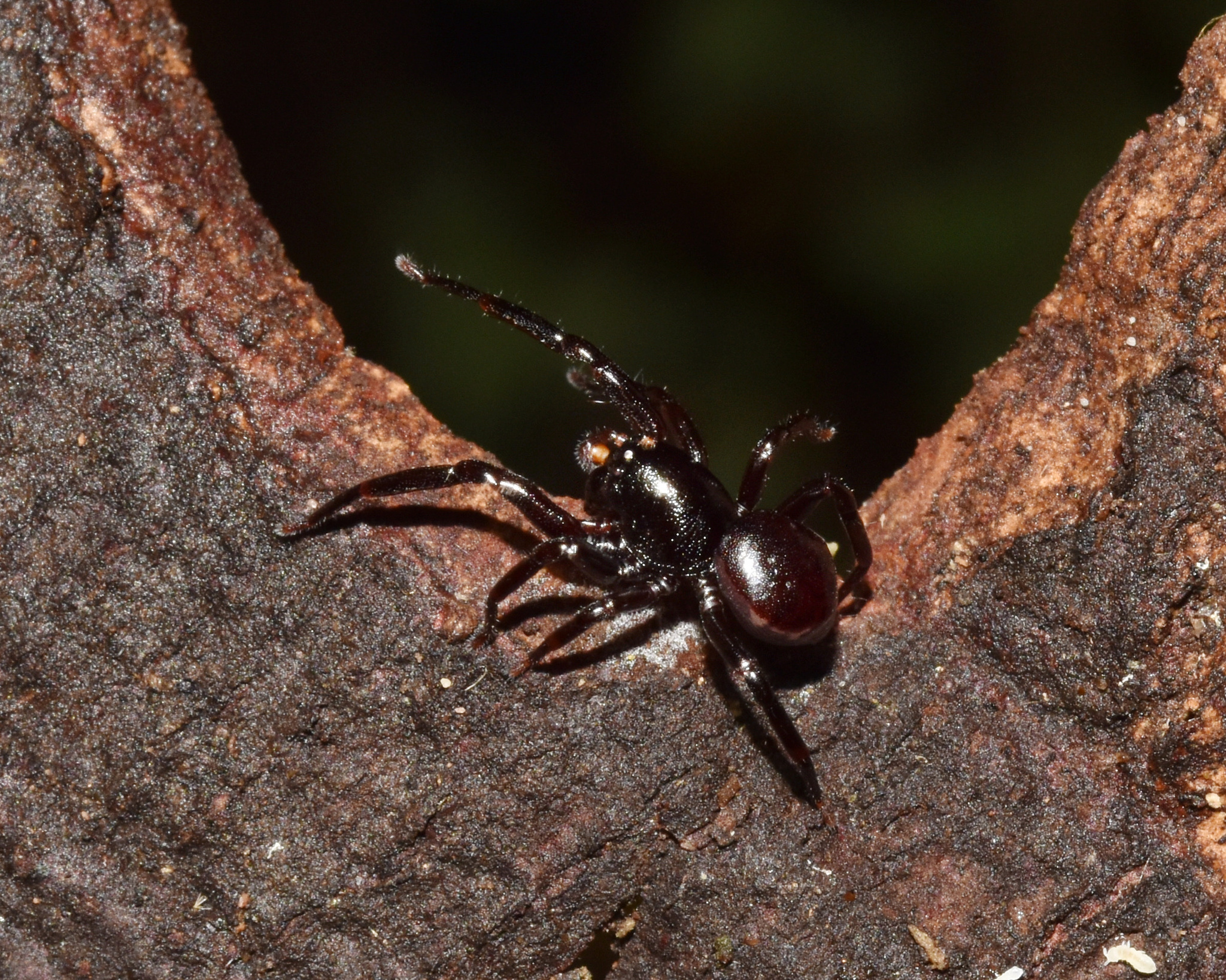

Scientific classification
- Kingdom: Animalia
- Phylum: Arthropoda
- Subphylum: Chelicerata
- Class: Arachnida
- Order: Araneae
- Infraorder: Araneomorphae
- Family: Corinnidae
- Genus: Pronophaea
- Species: P. natalica

Binomial name
- Pronophaea natalica Simon, 1897

Synonyms
- Medmassa nitida Lawrence, 1937

= Pronophaea natalica =

Natal Pronophaea dark sac spider

Species of spider

Pronophaea natalica is a spider species in the family Corinnidae. It is commonly known as the Natal Pronophaea dark sac spider.

== Distribution ==
Pronophaea natalica is endemic to South Africa, where it has a wide distribution across six provinces, Eastern Cape, Free State, KwaZulu-Natal, Limpopo, Mpumalanga and Western Cape.

== Habitat and ecology ==
This species consists of free-living ground-dwellers collected predominantly in leaf litter and pitfall traps. It has been sampled from all the floral biomes except the Desert and Succulent Karoo biomes, and also from commercial pine plantations, at altitudes ranging from 3 to 1,861 m above sea level.

== Conservation ==
Pronophaea natalica is listed as Least Concern by the South African National Biodiversity Institute due to its wide geographical range. It is conserved in more than 10 protected areas. There are no known threats to the species.

== Taxonomy ==
The species was originally described by Eugène Simon in 1897, with the type locality given only as Natal. It was redescribed by Haddad & Bosselaers (2010) and is a senior synonym of Medmassa nitida Lawrence, 1937, which was described from KwaZulu-Natal. The species is known from both sexes.
