= Camille Pictet =

Swiss naturalist (1864–1893)

Jules-Camille Pictet (June 28, 1864 – January 29, 1893) was a Swiss naturalist and specialist on hydrozoa. Along with Maurice Bedot he travelled to the Malay Archipelago on a collecting expedition and died shortly afterwards. His father Édouard Pictet (1835–1879) was also a naturalist who specialized in entomology, particularly of the Neuroptera.

Pictet was born in Geneva, the son of entomologist Édouard Pictet and Emilie Louise Mallet. His grandfather was the naturalist François-Jules Pictet de la Rive who founded the Museum of Natural History in Geneva. Other family relatives included Charles Bonnet and Horace-Bénédict de Saussure. Interested in science from an early age, he studied fossils with his grandfather. After studies in Stuttgart he worked under Carl Vogt at the University of Geneva and spent some time in the Roscoff biological station under Henri de Lacaze-Duthiers. He was a keen alpinist and was the first to climb Aiguille du Géant in 1887. He then became a student of Hermann Fol. He spent a year in Freiburg im Breisgau under August Weismann and Robert Wiedersheim. In 1890 he went on an expedition to study marine organisms to the Malay Peninsula, accompanying Maurice Bedot. Returning, he wrote a dissertation on spermatogenesis and received a doctorate on July 8, 1891. He continued to work with Fol at Villefranche. In 1891 he married the Swiss artist Marie Diodati (1866–1958, she later married Pictet's friend Bedot, becoming Marie Bedot-Diodati). While working on a monograph of the expedition results, he became ill and fifteen days later he died at the age of 28.
