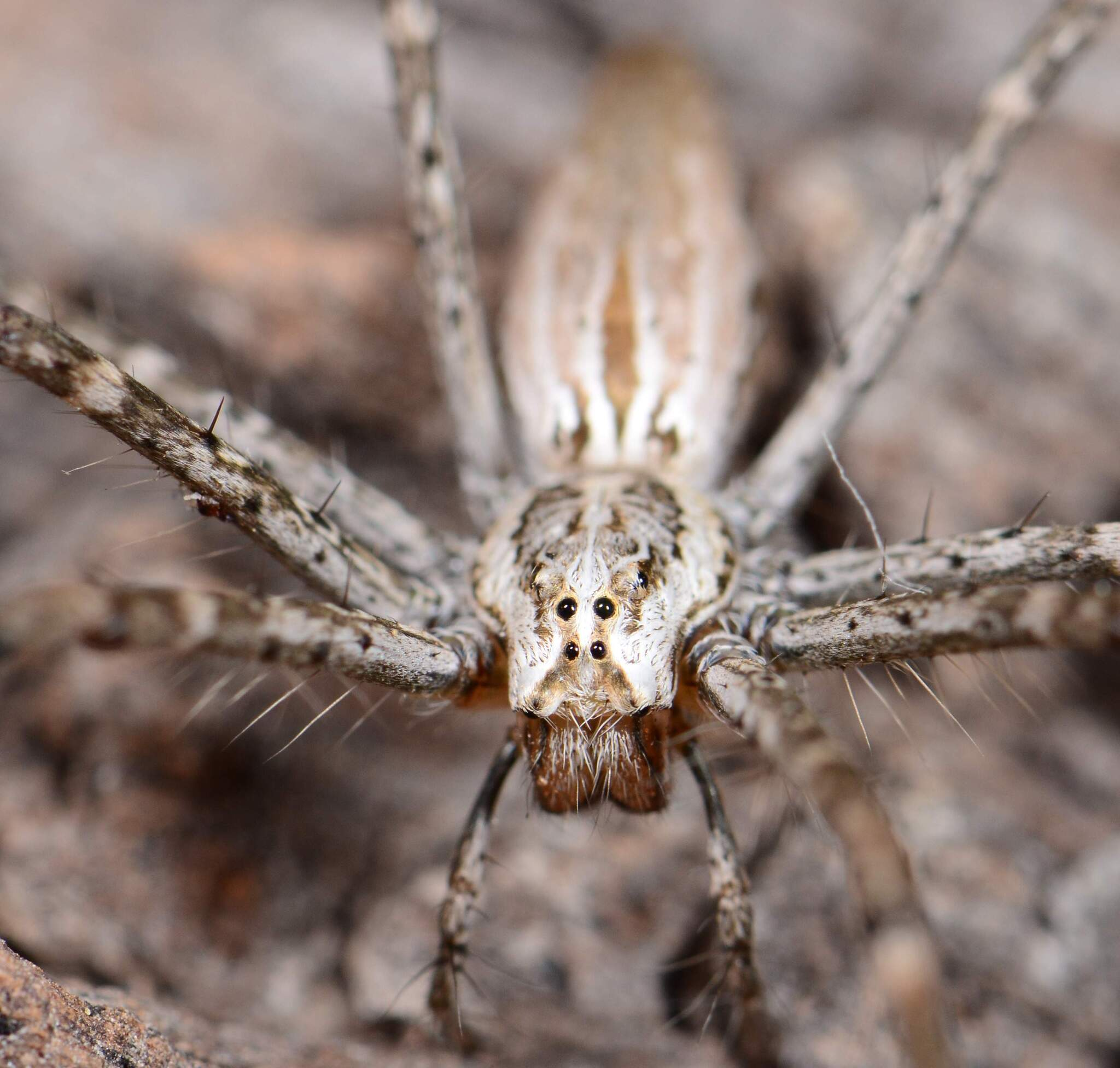
- female
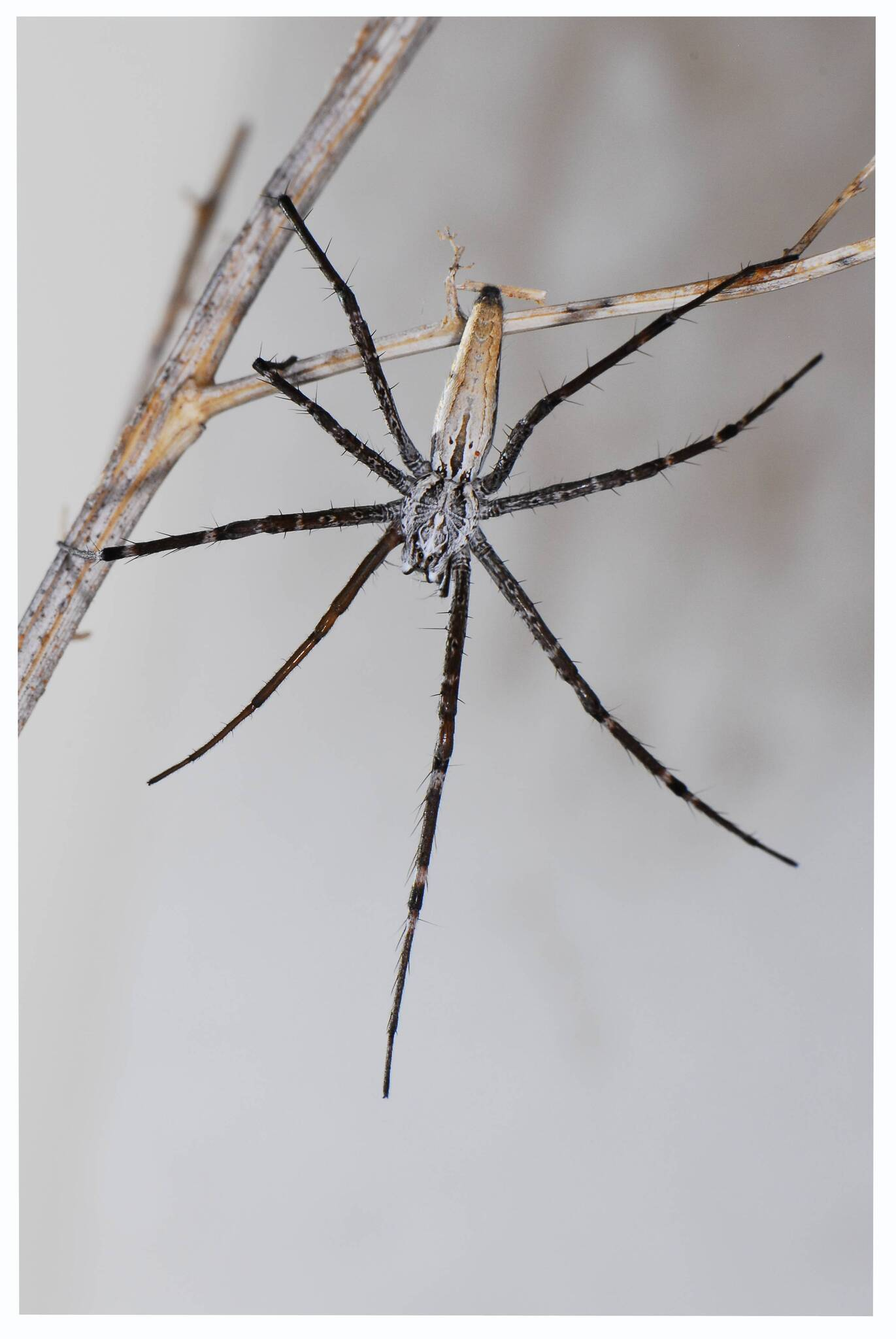
- female

Scientific classification
- Kingdom: Animalia
- Phylum: Arthropoda
- Subphylum: Chelicerata
- Class: Arachnida
- Order: Araneae
- Infraorder: Araneomorphae
- Family: Pisauridae
- Genus: Euprosthenops
- Species: E. bayaonianus

Binomial name
- Euprosthenops bayaonianus (Brito Capello, 1867)

= Euprosthenops bayaonianus =

Decorated Euprosthenops Nursery-Web Spider

Species of spider

Euprosthenops bayaonianus is a species of spider in the family Pisauridae. It is found across several African countries and is commonly known as the decorated Euprosthenops nursery-web spider.

== Distribution ==
Euprosthenops bayaonianus has a wide distribution across Africa. It is found in Sierra Leone, Ivory Coast, Ghana, the Democratic Republic of the Congo, Kenya, Zambia, Mozambique, and South Africa. In South Africa, it has been recorded from six provinces at altitudes ranging from 415 to 1,444 m above sea level.

== Habitat and ecology ==
Funnel-web pisaurids construct their webs in short shrubs and bushes close to the ground. Large webs are made in vegetation with a funnel at the bottom. The capture web is sheet-like and composed of dense criss-crossing threads. The species has been sampled from the Grassland, Savanna, and Thicket biomes.

== Description ==
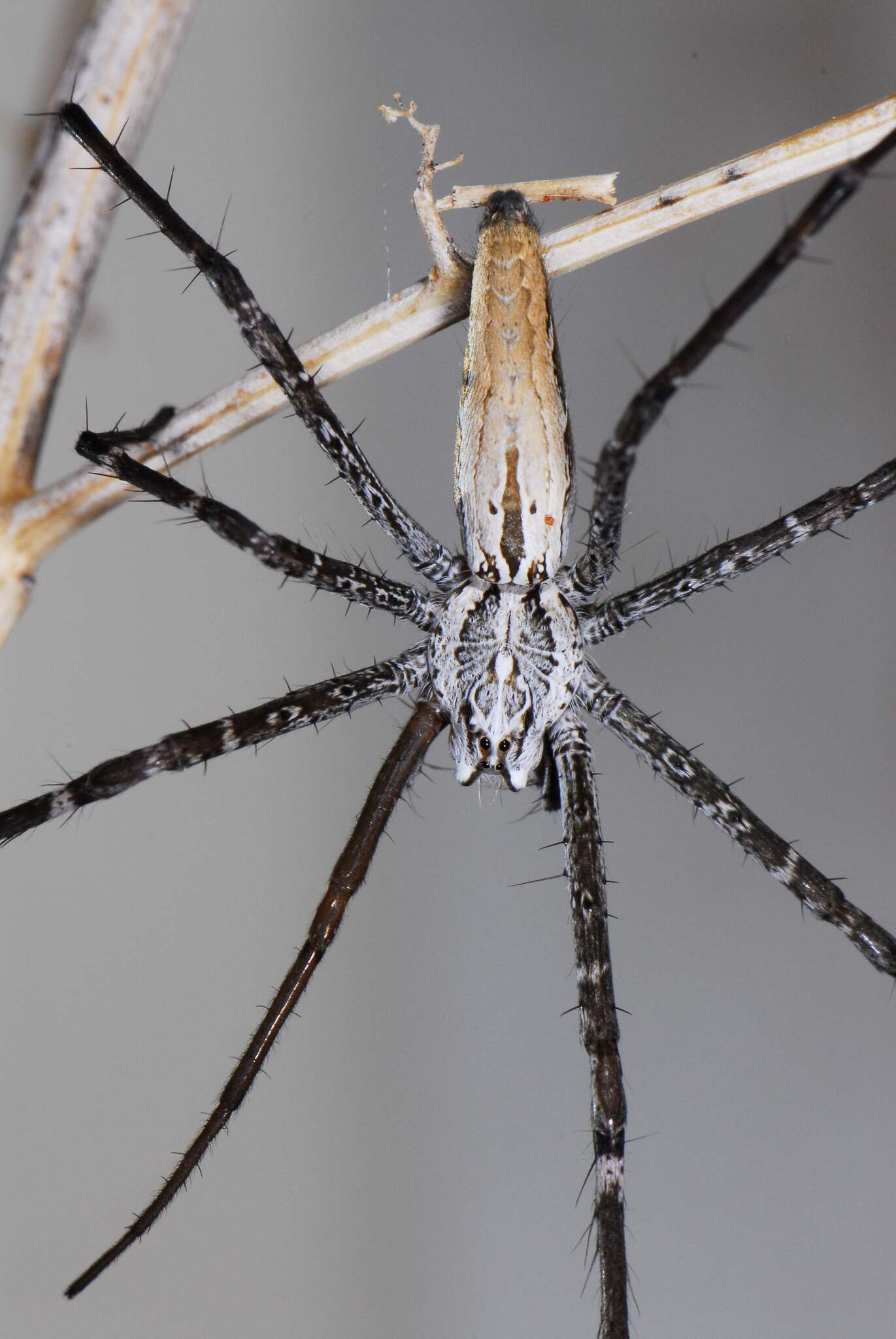
female

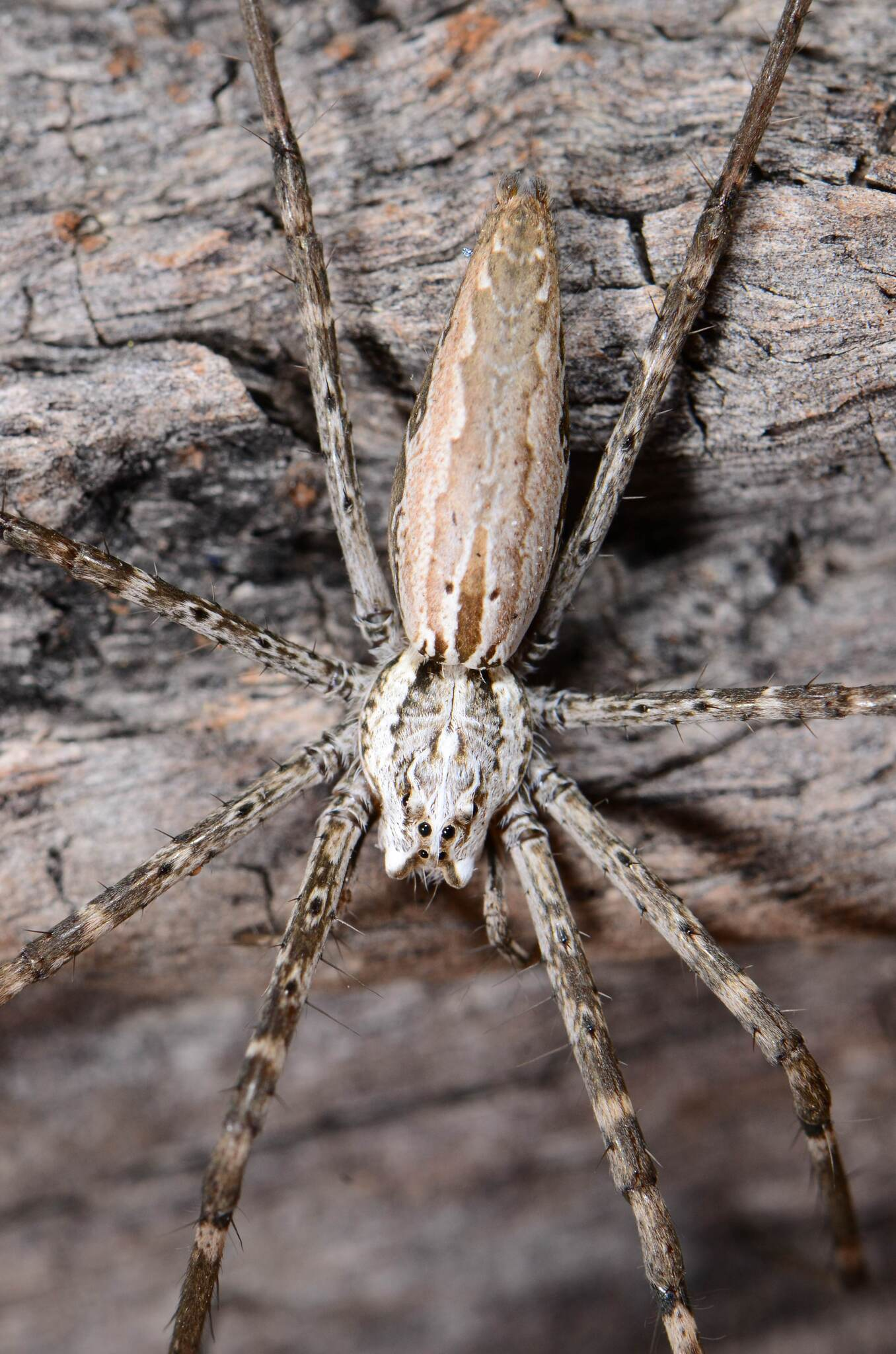
female

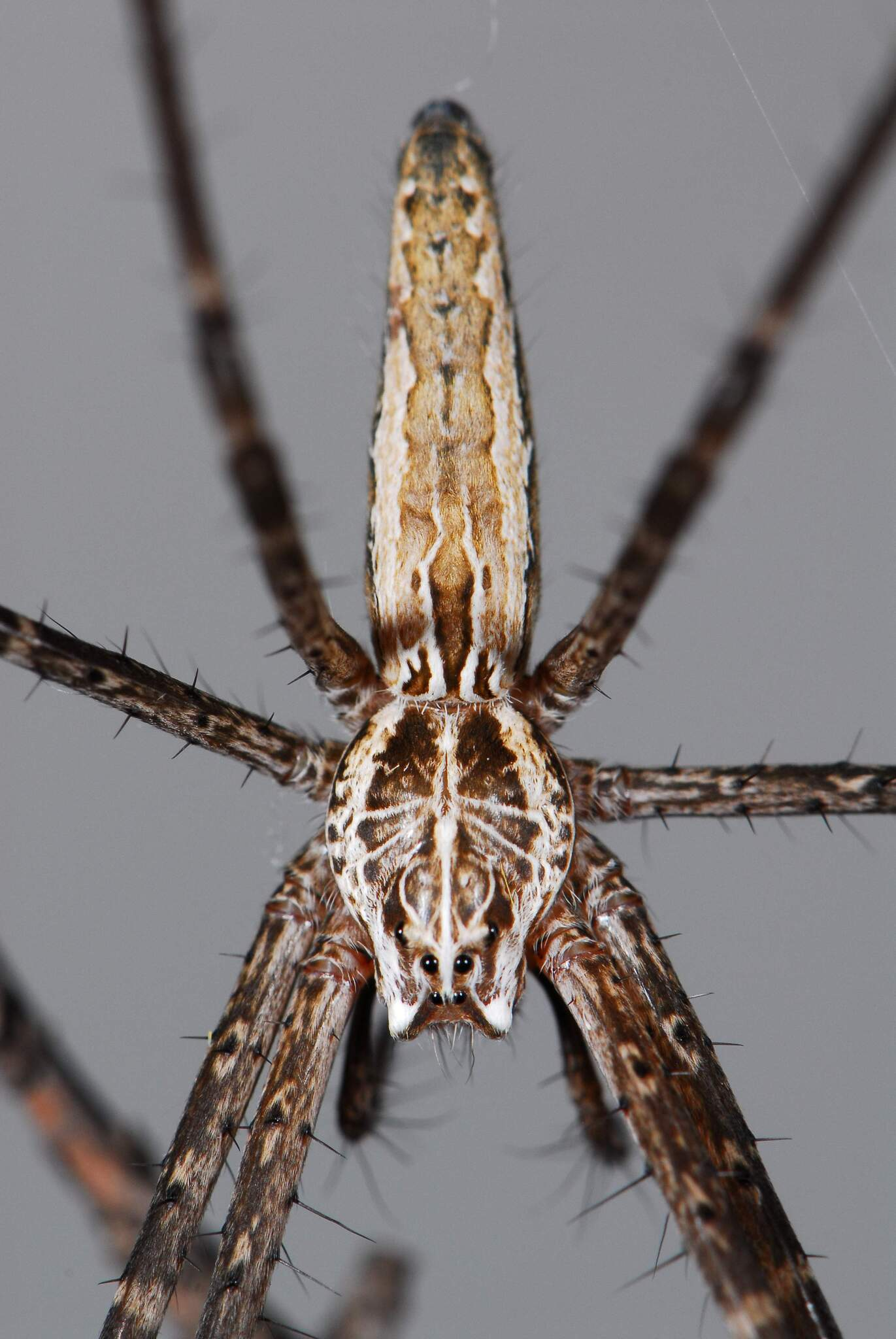
female

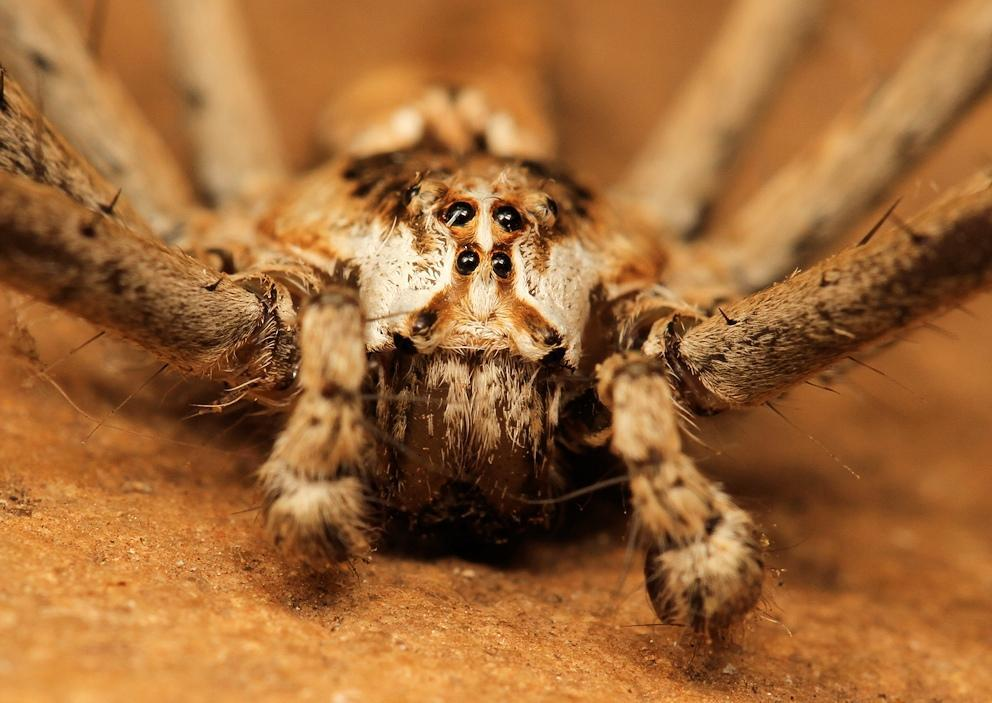

== Conservation ==
Euprosthenops bayaonianus is listed as Least Concern by the South African National Biodiversity Institute due to its wide geographical range. There are no significant threats to the species, and it is protected in several areas including Addo Elephant National Park, Kalkfontein Dam Nature Reserve, Kwandwe Private Game Reserve, Mpetsane Conservation Estate, Acacia Lodge Game Reserve, and Nelshoogte Forest Reserve.

== Etymology ==
The species name bayaonianus refers to the original type locality in Mozambique.

== Taxonomy ==
The species was originally described by Brito Capello in 1867 as Podophthalma bayonianna from Mozambique. It was revised by Blandin in 1976 and is known from both sexes.
