= Lessertinella =

Scientific classification
- Kingdom: Animalia
- Phylum: Arthropoda
- Subphylum: Chelicerata
- Class: Arachnida
- Order: Araneae
- Infraorder: Araneomorphae
- Family: Linyphiidae
- Genus: Lessertinella; Denis, 1947

Type species
- L. kulczynskii (Lessert, 1909)

Species
- L. carpatica Weiss, 1979 – Slovakia, Romania, Macedonia; L. kulczynskii (Lessert, 1909) – Alps (France, Italy, Switzerland, Germany, Austria), Slovakia

Genus of spiders

Lessertinella is a genus of dwarf spiders that was first described by J. Denis in 1947. As of May 2019 it contains only two species, both found in Austria, France, Germany, Italy, Macedonia, Romania, Slovakia, and Switzerland: L. carpatica and L. kulczynskii.
