= Maurice Bedot =

Swiss zoologist, specialist of coelenterates

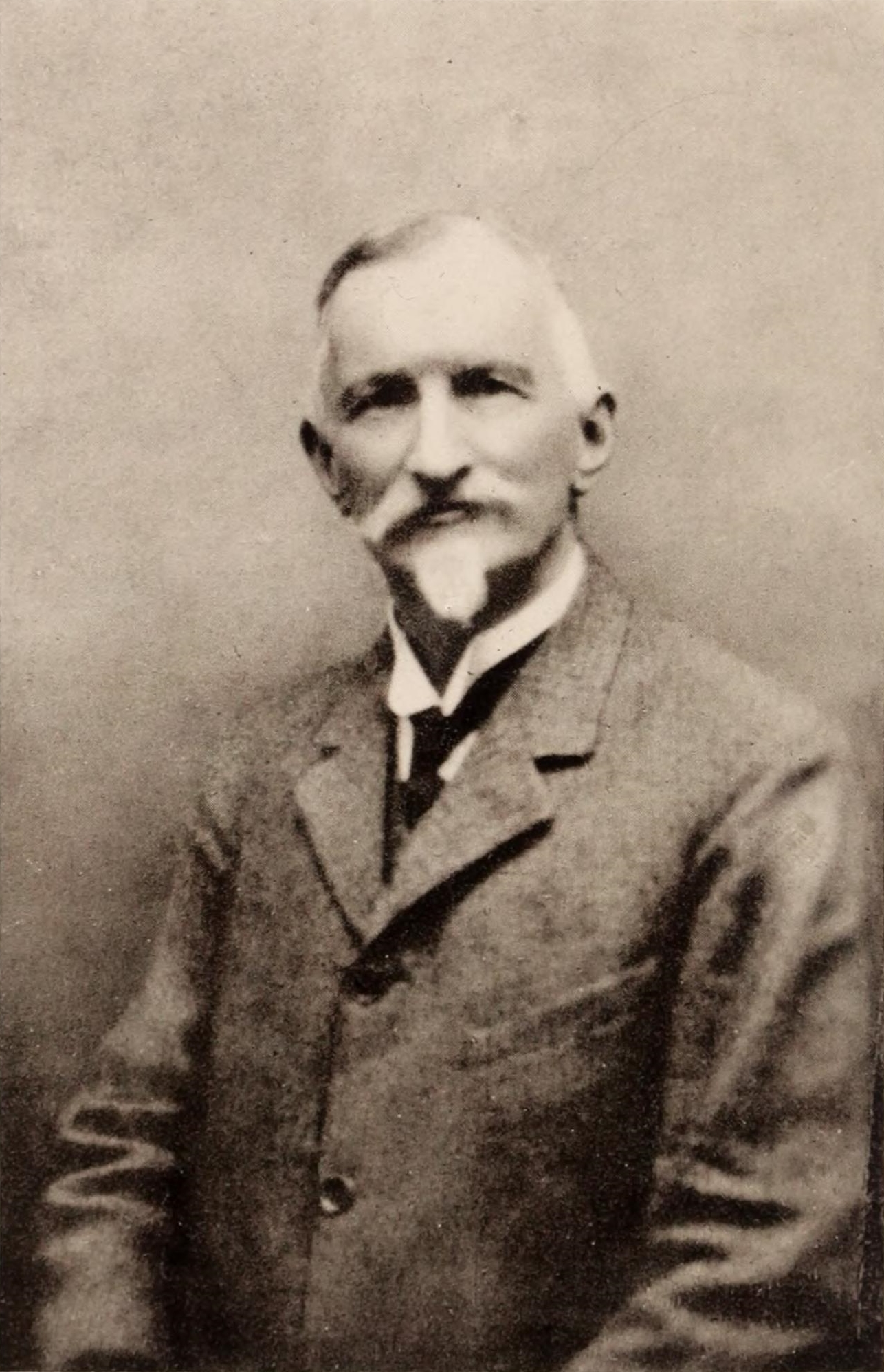

Maurice Bedot (7 April 1859 – 27 August 1927) was a Swiss zoologist who became a director of the Museum of Natural History in Geneva. He took part in an expedition into the Malay Archipelago to collect marine biological specimens.

Bedot studied at the University of Geneva under Carl Vogt and Hermann Fol. He also spent some time at the University of Jena working under Oscar Hertwig on his doctorate. He spent time at the marine biological station in Naples. In 1890 Bedot was part of a team along with Camille Pictet to join an expedition to the Malay Archipelago. He travelled through Sarawak, Borneo, lived with Dayaks and then visited Java. He spent two and a half months in the Bay of Amboina collecting specimens. The collections made were studied subsequently and he published two monographs which included descriptions of the expedition. He also took an interest in physical anthropology and studied the cranial characters of the people of Valais. He became the director of the Museum of Natural History in Geneva in 1891 and held the position for 36 years. He founded the journal Swiss Review of Zoology in 1893 which he edited until his death. Bedot took an interest in numismatics, anthropology and music and was keenly involved in promoting young zoologists. Among the people he influenced was Jean Piaget. From 1897 he also served as a professor of general zoology at the University of Geneva. He was elected to the Geographical Society of Geneva in 1891. He married the widow of Pictet, Marie Diodati who became a well-known artist and jewellery designer. She illustrated many of his zoology works.
