= Roger de Lessert =

Swiss arachnologist (1878–1945)

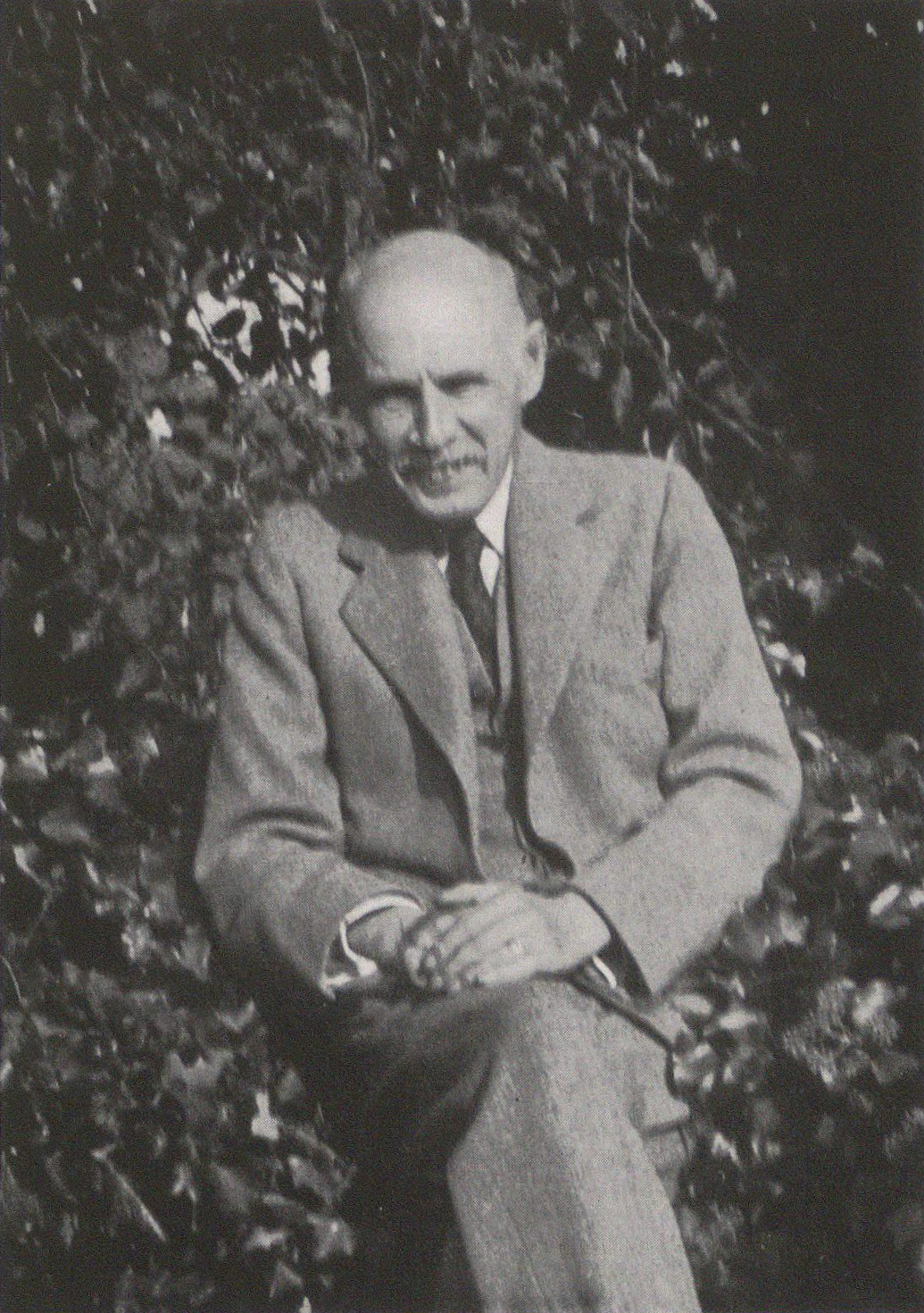

Roger de Lessert (11 September 1878 – 1945) was a Swiss zoologist and arachnologist. He published extensively on spiders, particularly of the Afrotropical region. He described a large number of species and several are named in his honour including the genera Lessertia Smith, 1908 (Linyphiidae), Lessertina Lawrence, 1942 (Eutichuridae), Lessertinella Denis, 1947 (Linyphiidae) and Pellolessertia Strand, 1929 (Salticidae).

== Life and work ==
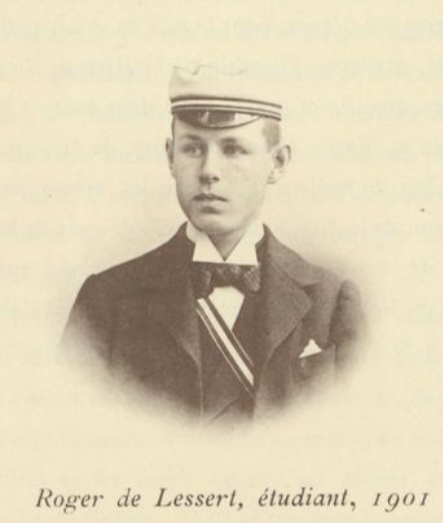
As a student in 1901

De Lessert was born in Lavigny, Canton of Vaud, Switzerland in the noble family of Henry de Lessert and Marie Tronchin de la Rive. He studied at the University of Geneva and received a doctorate in 1903 under Emile Yung (1854–1918) who succeeded Carl Vogt. In his thesis he introduced 60 species of spiders new to Switzerland. In 1906 he married his cousin Jacqueline de Lessert de Neufville. He was active in the Zoological Society of Switzerland and contributed to the catalogue of invertebrates of Switzerland by Maurice Bedot. In 1908 he joined the Museum of Natural History in Geneva to work on the arthropod collections. He retired in 1918 and moved to Buchillon where he spent most of his time studying spiders. In 1908 he made a trip to East Africa on a collecting expedition as a substitute for Jean Carl (1877–1944). He later studied the spiders collected on Swedish expeditions by Yngve Sjöstedt and A. Tullgren as well as by the American Museum to Uganda, Kilimanjaro, South Africa, Congo, Angola, and Portuguese East Africa between 1913 and 1922. A street in Buchillon is named after him as Rue Roger-de-Lessert.
