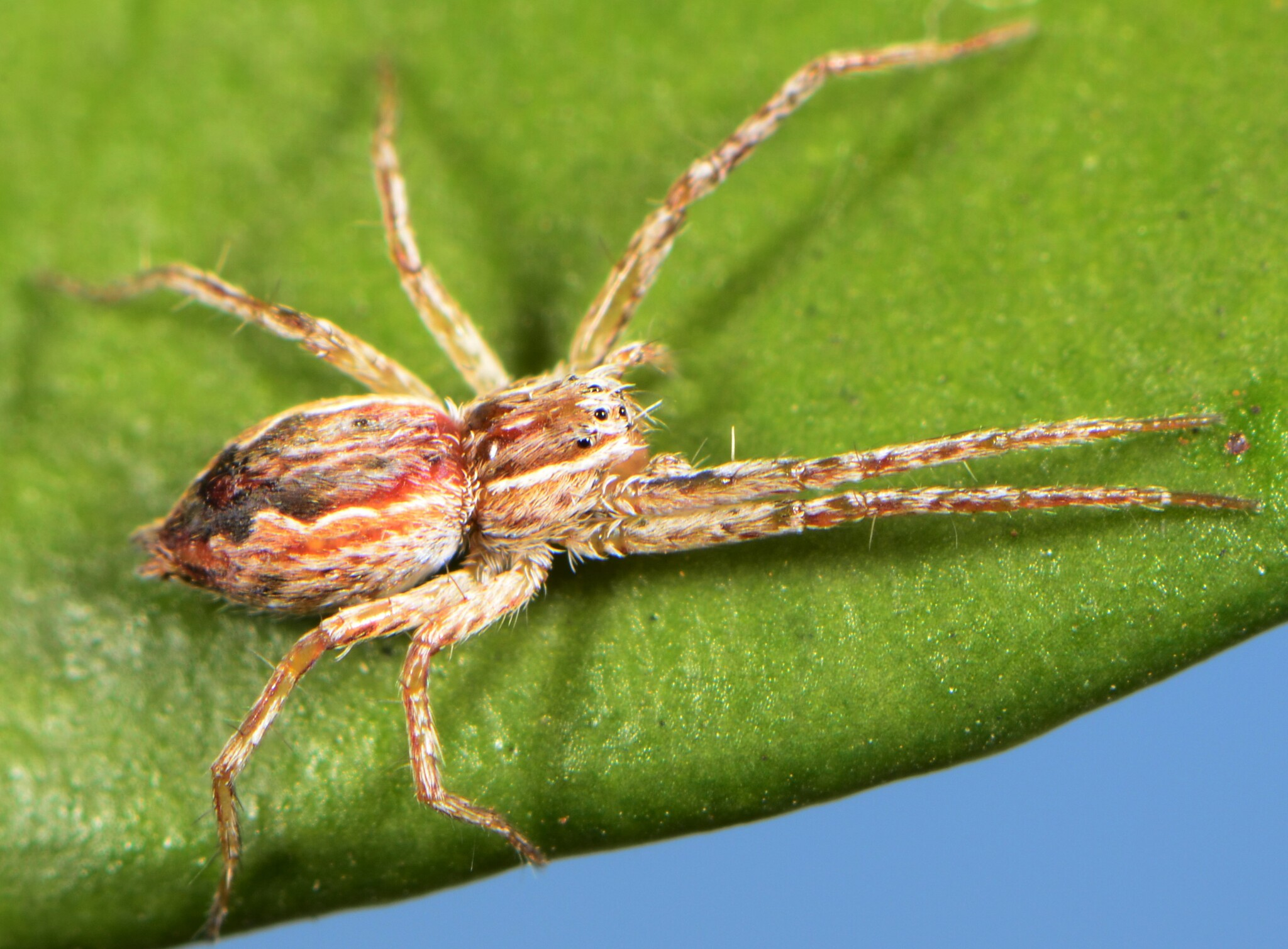
- female
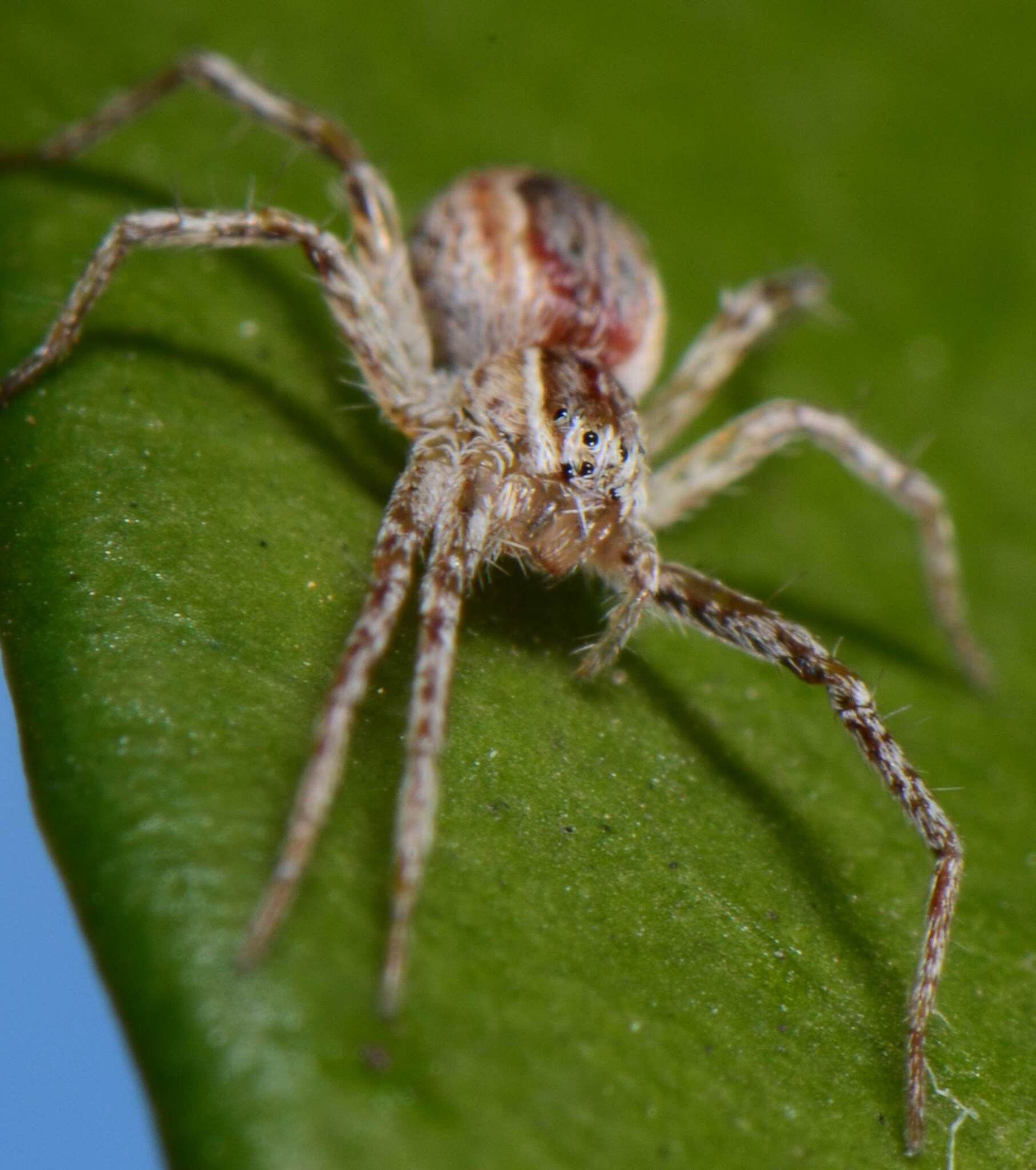
- female

Scientific classification
- Kingdom: Animalia
- Phylum: Arthropoda
- Subphylum: Chelicerata
- Class: Arachnida
- Order: Araneae
- Infraorder: Araneomorphae
- Family: Pisauridae
- Genus: Afropisaura
- Species: A. rothiformis

Binomial name
- Afropisaura rothiformis (Strand, 1908)

Synonyms
- Pisaura rothiformis Strand, 1908; Rothus faradjensis Lessert, 1928; Pisaura faradjensis Roewer, 1955

= Afropisaura rothiformis =

Common Afropisaura grass nursery-web spider

Species of spider

Afropisaura rothiformis is a species of spider in the family Pisauridae. It has a wide distribution throughout Africa and is commonly known as the common Afropisaura grass nursery-web spider.

== Distribution ==
Afropisaura rothiformis has a wide distribution throughout Africa, including Angola, Burundi, Cameroon, Democratic Republic of the Congo, Ethiopia, Nigeria, Somalia, Tanzania, Uganda and South Africa.

In South Africa, it has been sampled from seven provinces. Localities include Mkambati Nature Reserve and Addo Elephant National Park in the Eastern Cape, Irene and Wonderboom in Gauteng, Ndumo Game Reserve and Tembe Elephant Park in KwaZulu-Natal, Blouberg Nature Reserve and Kruger National Park in Limpopo, Kruger National Park sites in Mpumalanga, Kgaswane Mountain Reserve in North West, and Cederberg Wilderness Area in the Western Cape.

== Habitat and ecology ==
The species is a free-living nursery-web spider commonly found on vegetation at night. Their movements are erratic as they move swiftly in leaps or jumps.

They are sampled with sweep nets and have been recorded from the Grassland, Savanna and Thicket biomes at altitudes ranging from 1 to 1706 m.

== Description ==
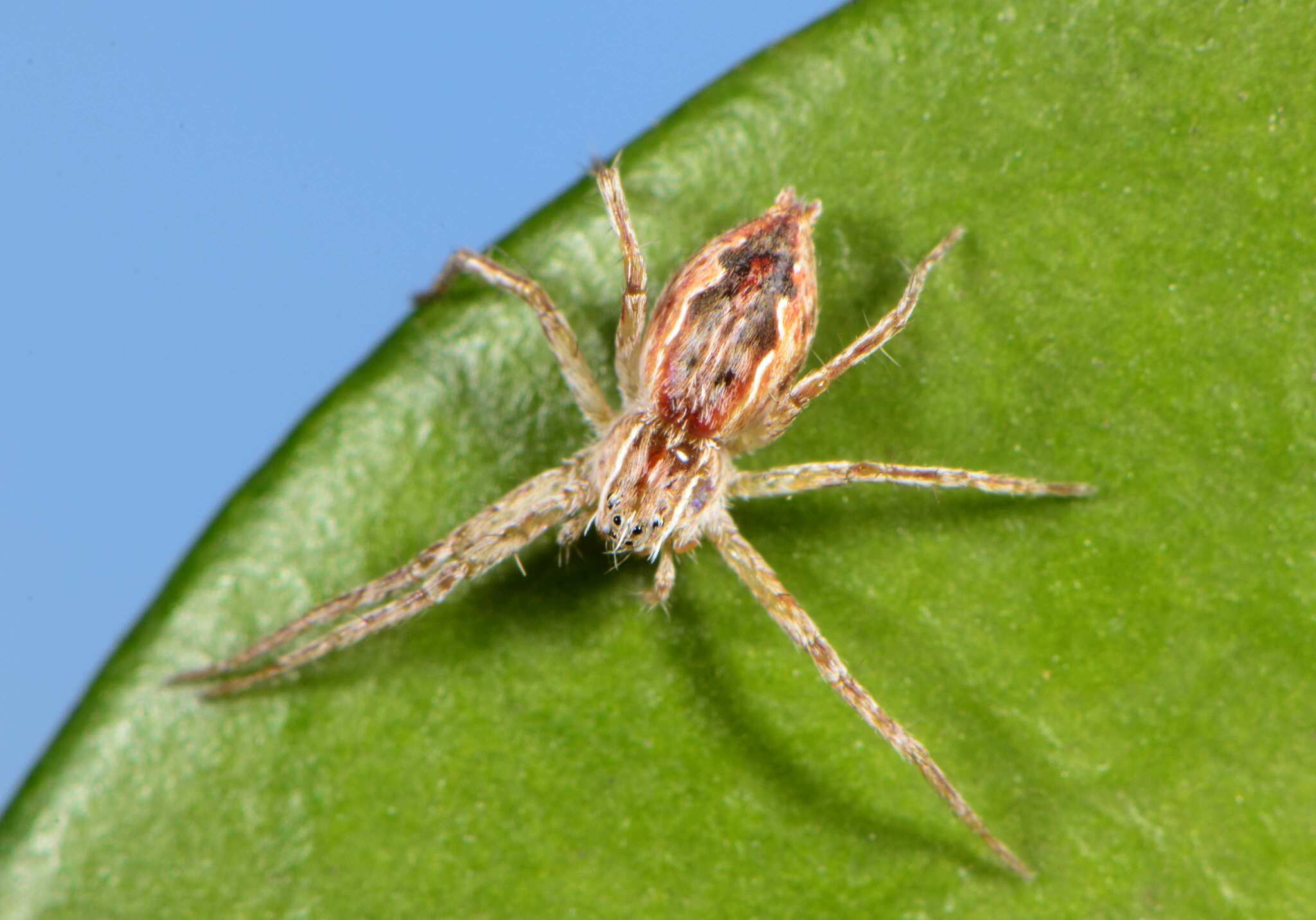
female

== Conservation ==
Afropisaura rothiformis is listed as Least Concern due to its wide geographical range. The species is recorded from 11 protected areas in South Africa. There are no significant threats to the species.

== Taxonomy ==
The species was originally described by Embrik Strand in 1908 as Pisaura rothiformis from Cameroon. It was transferred to Afropisaura by Blandin in 1976, who also synonymized Pisaura faradjensis Lessert, 1928 with this species. The species is known from both sexes and has been revised by Blandin (1976) and Sierwald (1997).
