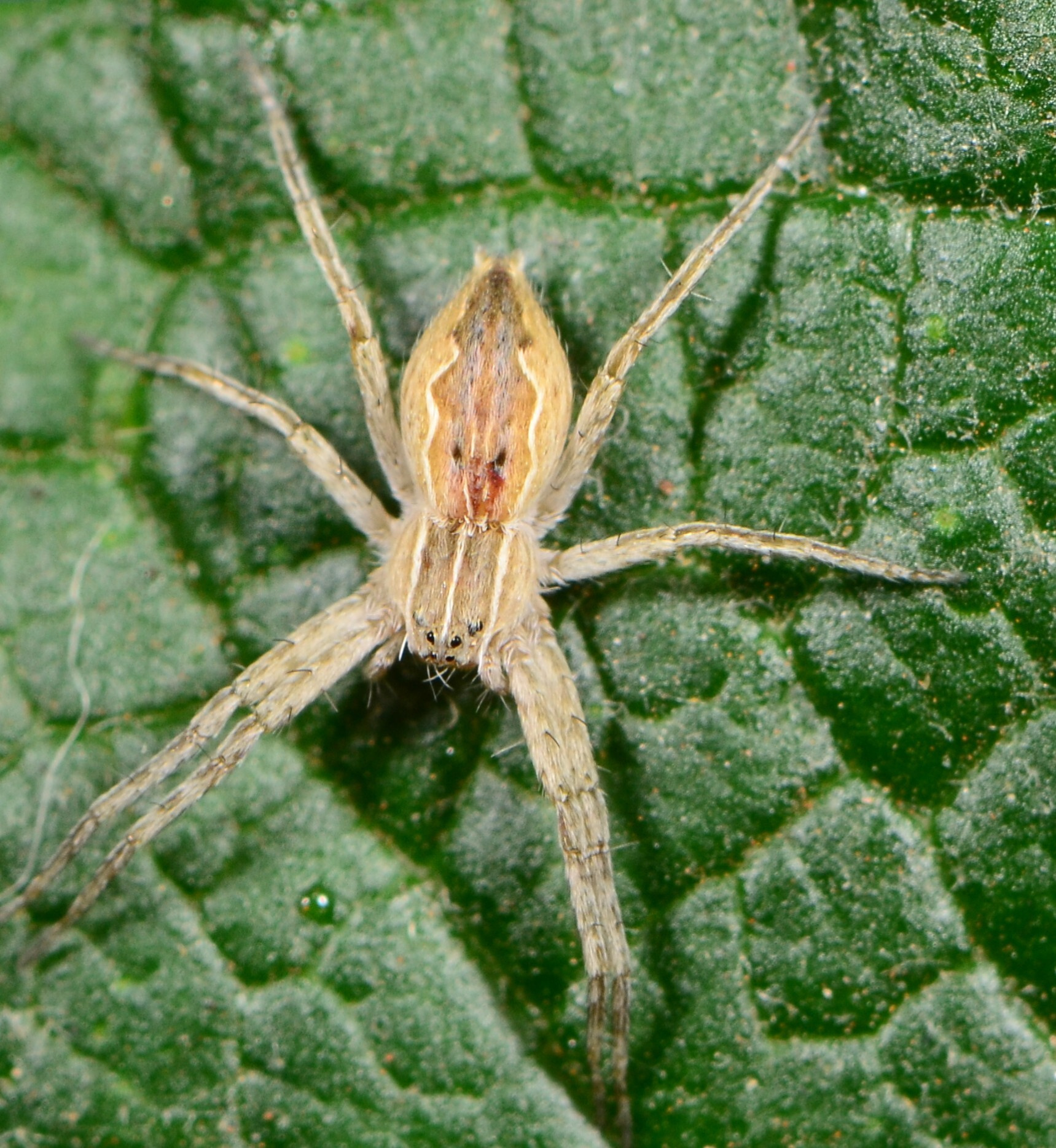
- juvenile
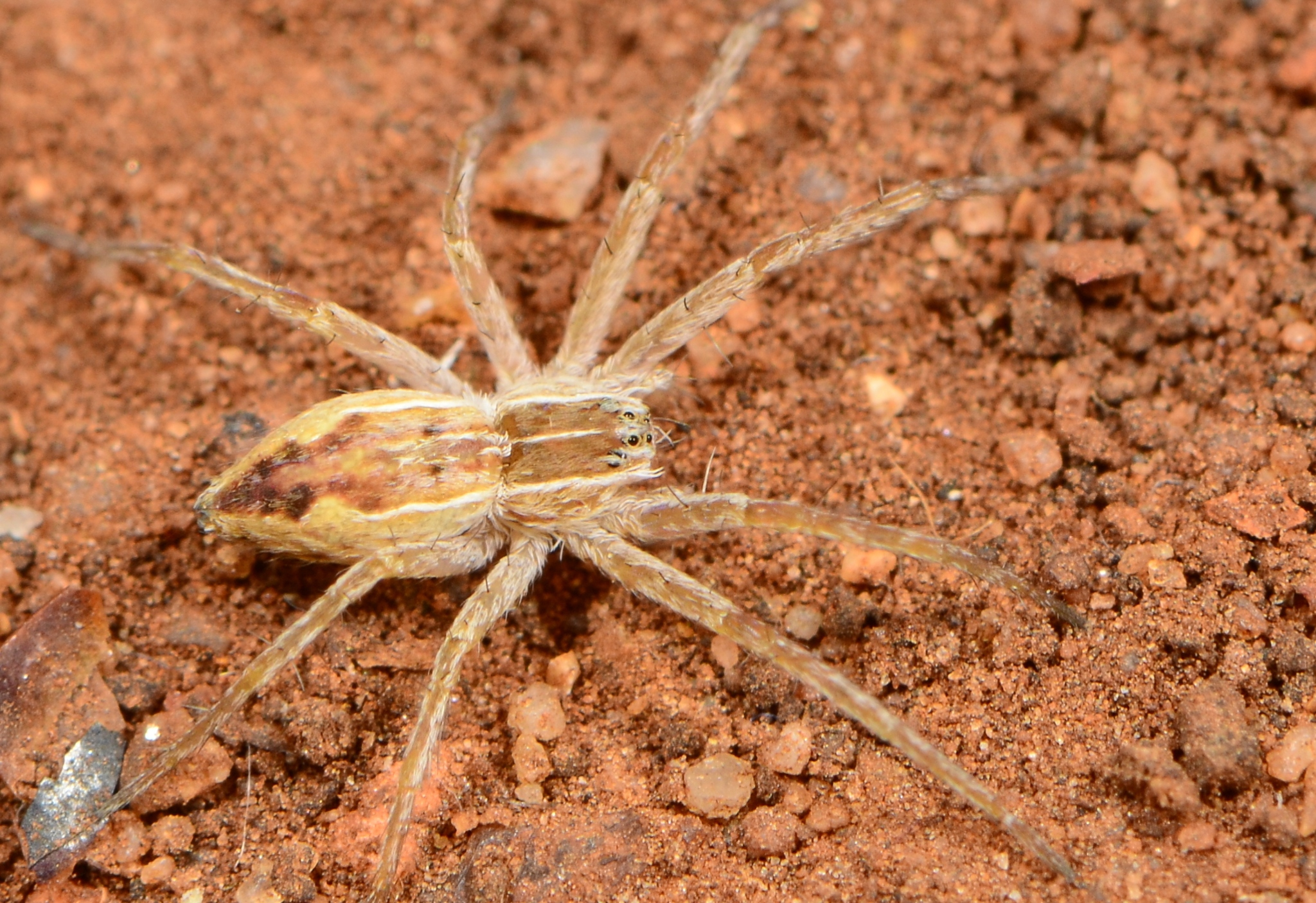
- juvenile

Scientific classification
- Kingdom: Animalia
- Phylum: Arthropoda
- Subphylum: Chelicerata
- Class: Arachnida
- Order: Araneae
- Infraorder: Araneomorphae
- Family: Pisauridae
- Genus: Afropisaura
- Species: A. ducis

Binomial name
- Afropisaura ducis (Strand, 1913)

Synonyms
- Pisaura ducis Strand, 1913; Pisaura camerunensis Roewer, 1955

= Afropisaura ducis =

East Africa Afropisaura nursery-web spider

Species of spider

Afropisaura ducis is an African species of spider in the family Pisauridae. It is commonly known as the East Africa Afropisaura nursery-web spider.

== Distribution ==
Afropisaura ducis has a wide distribution throughout Africa. In South Africa, it has been recorded from four provinces at altitudes ranging from 16 to 1513 m.

Notable South African localities include Mountain Zebra National Park in the Eastern Cape, Umhlanga Rocks in KwaZulu-Natal, Lephalale in Limpopo, and Irene in Gauteng.

== Habitat and ecology ==
The species is a free-living nursery-web spider commonly found on vegetation at night. Their movements are erratic as they move swiftly around in leaps or jumps. The species has been sampled from the Grassland, Savanna and Thicket biomes.

== Description ==
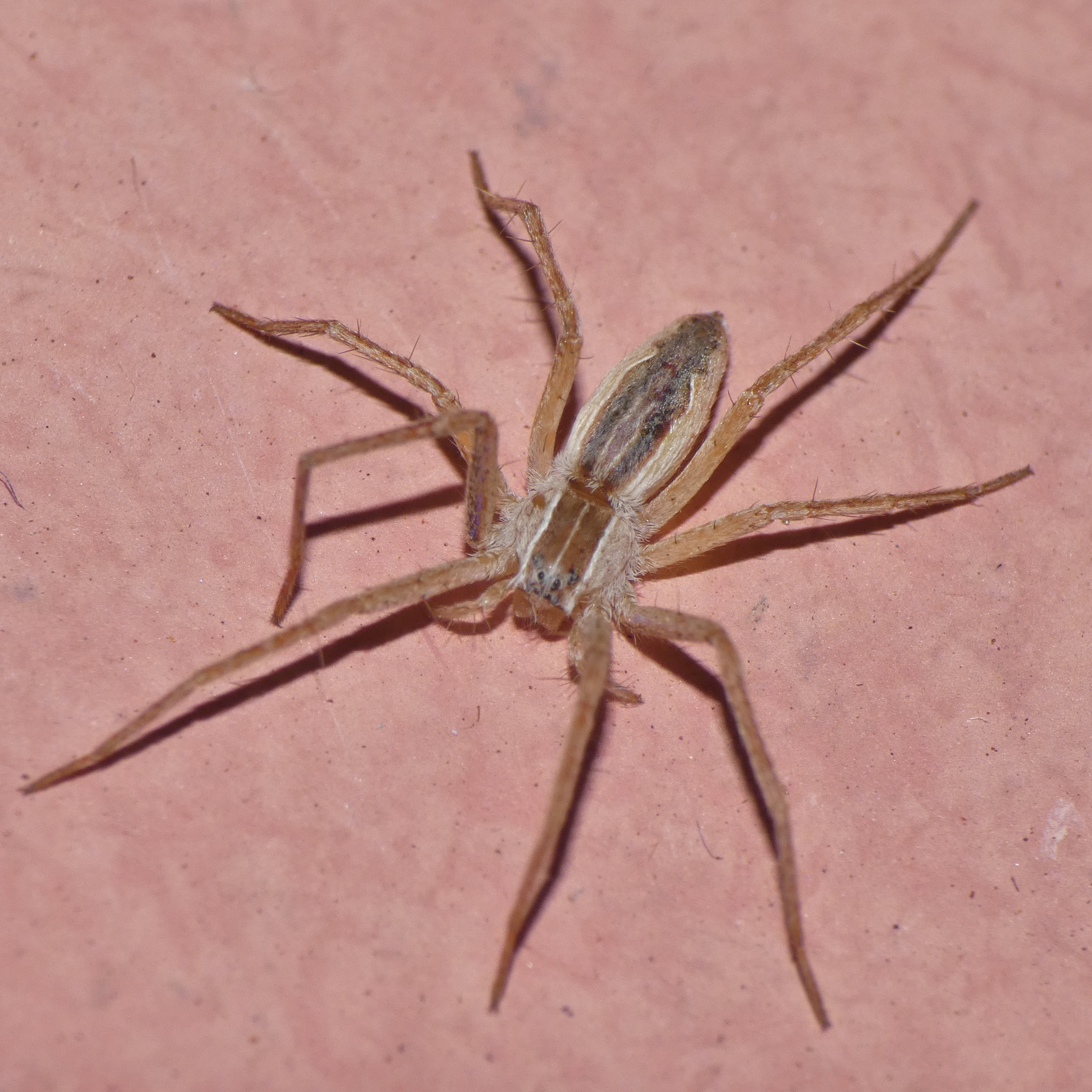

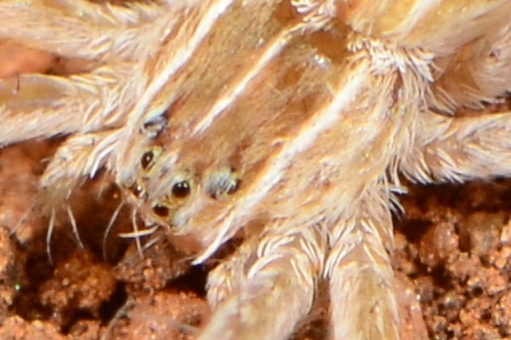
female

== Conservation ==
Afropisaura ducis is listed as Least Concern due to its wide geographical range. The species is protected in Mountain Zebra National Park. There are no significant threats to the species.

== Taxonomy ==
The species was originally described by Embrik Strand in 1913 as Pisaura ducis from Lake Kivu in East Africa. It was transferred to the genus Afropisaura by Blandin in 1976, who also synonymized Pisaura camerunensis Roewer, 1955 with this species. The species has been revised by Blandin (1976) and Sierwald (1997) and is known from both sexes.
