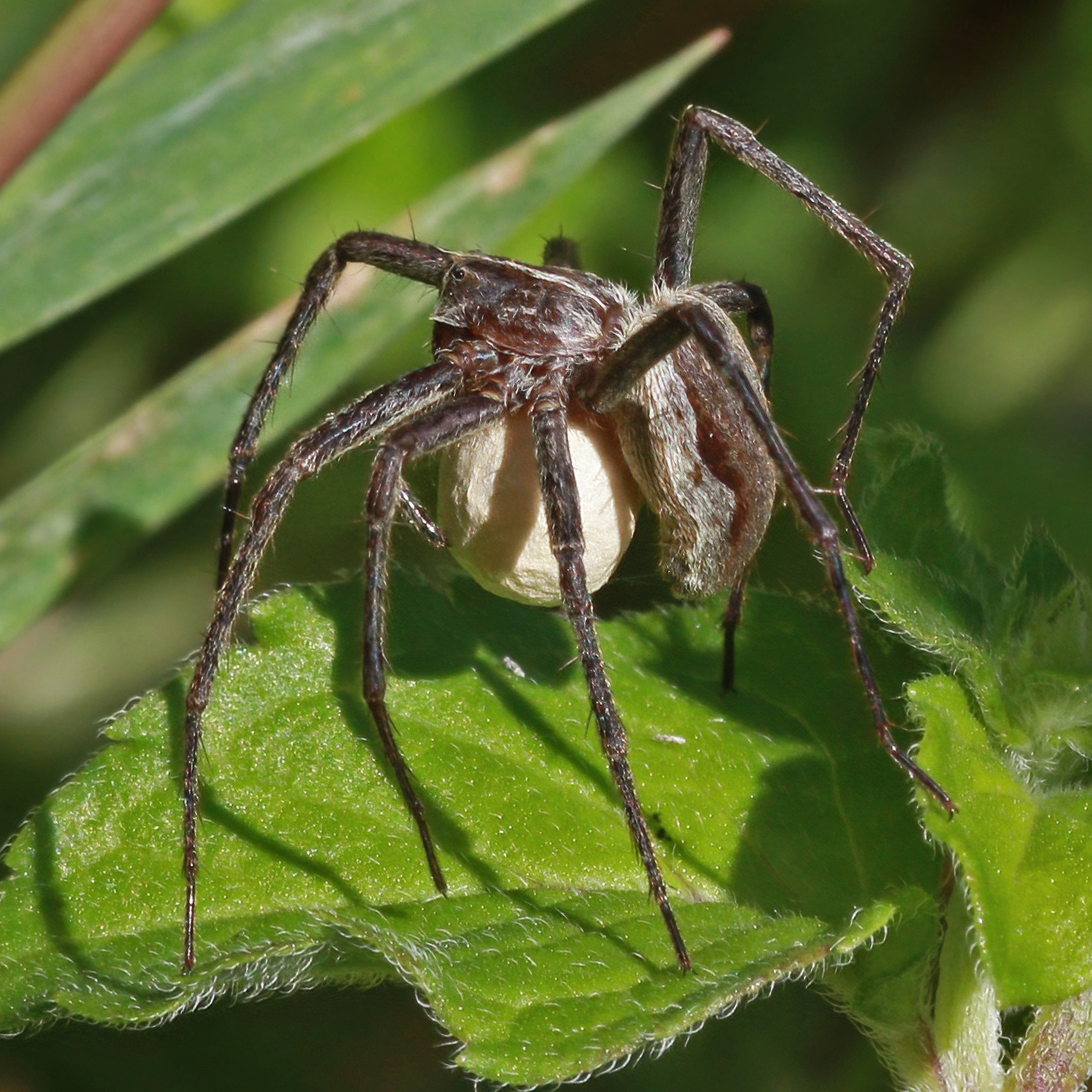
- Female carrying egg sack

Scientific classification
- Kingdom: Animalia
- Phylum: Arthropoda
- Subphylum: Chelicerata
- Class: Arachnida
- Order: Araneae
- Infraorder: Araneomorphae
- Family: Pisauridae
- Genus: Pisaura
- Species: P. mirabilis

Binomial name
- Pisaura mirabilis (Clerck, 1757)

Synonyms
- Aranea listeri Scopoli, 1763; Aranea arcuato-lineata Martini & Goeze, 1778; Aranea flavo-striata Martini & Goeze, 1778; Aranea tripunctata Martini & Goeze, 1778; Aranea rufo-fasciata De Geer, 1783; Aranea marmorata Fourcroy, 1785; Aranea agraria Olivier, 1789; Aranea obscura Fabricius, 1793; Aranea bivittata Risso, 1826; Ocyale murina C. L. Koch, 1837; Dolomedes scheuchzeri Bremi-Wolff, 1849; Ocyale mirabilis albida Franganillo, 1913; Ocyale mirabilis fusca Franganillo, 1913

= Pisaura mirabilis =

Species of spider

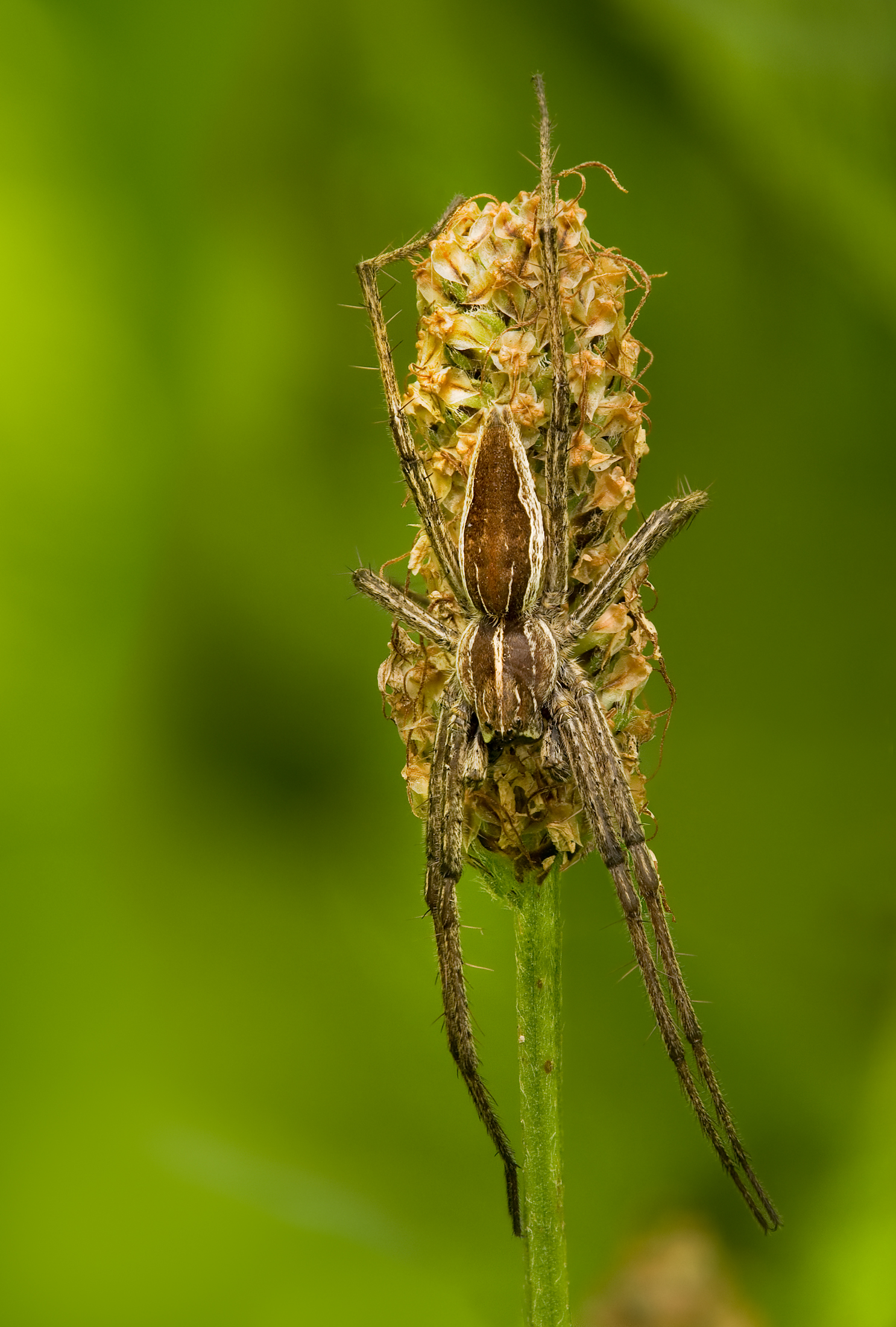
On Plantago lanceolata

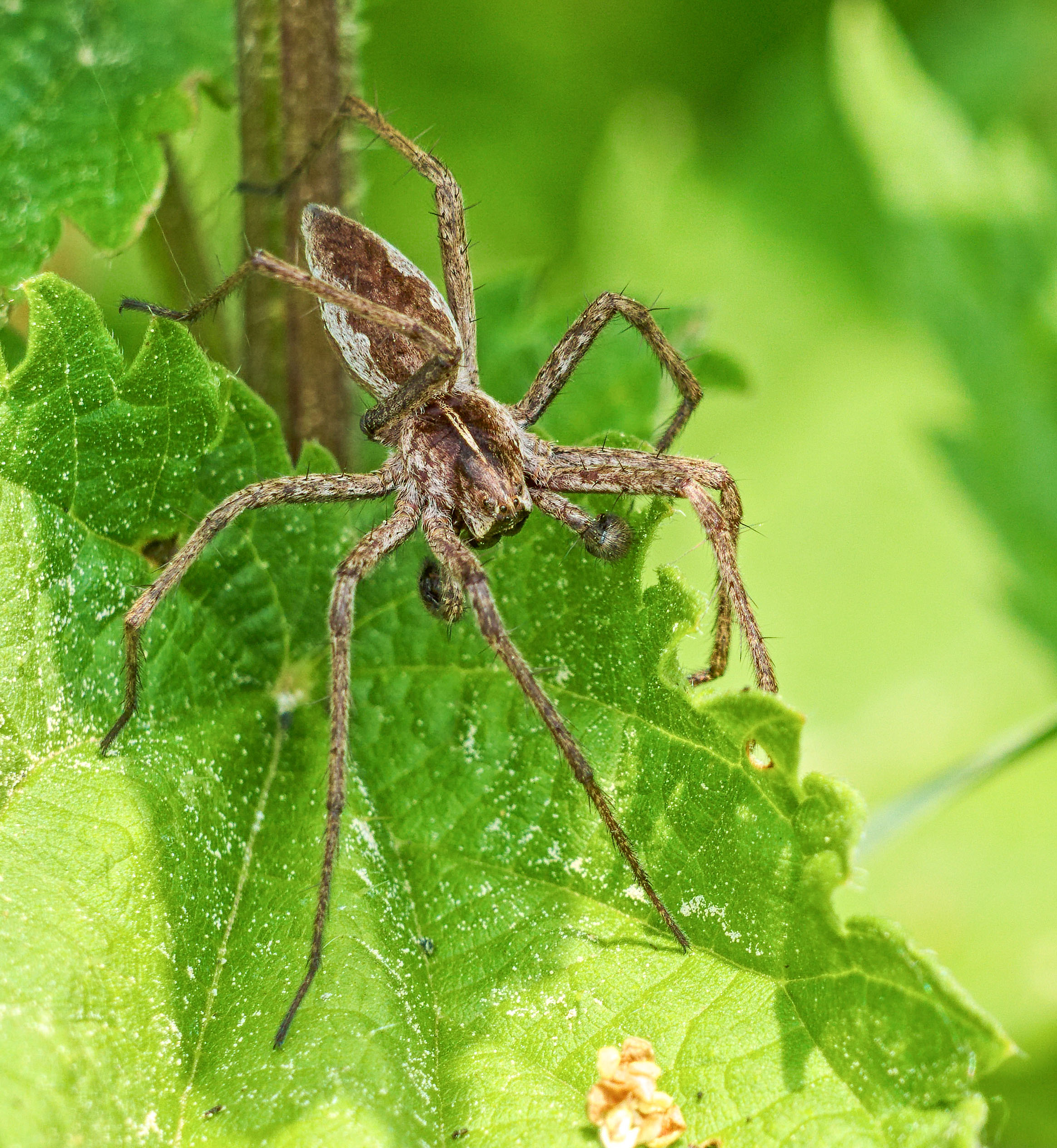
Male

Pisaura mirabilis, also known as the predatory spider, cunning spider or bridal gift spider, belongs to the hunting spider family (Pisauridae) and the superfamily Lycosoidea. It is widespread throughout Europe. In 2002, it was voted Spider of the Year by the Arachnological Society.

== Description ==
Striking characteristics of Pisaura mirabilis are its long legs (the fourth pair being the longest) and its slender abdomen (opisthosoma). The male is between 10 and 13 mm, while the female is 12 to 15 mm. After final ecdysis, the male spiders weigh on average 54 mg and females 68 mg.

The prosoma (cephalothorax) is variable in color, ranging from light to reddish brown and from gray to black. A lighter stripe is visible down the middle of the prosoma. The opisthosoma (abdomen) is long and narrow and tapered towards the rear end.

The female spiders has a dark patch (epigyne) on the underside of her abdomen that includes the copulatory organs. Male genital openings can be found at the same location, but remain inconspicuous.

Patterning and coloration varies due to polymorphism. These patterns, which can be caused by hair and pigments, change with the growth of the spider (ontogenesis).

Male spiders exhibit a stronger contrast than females and appear black, especially when compared to the white nuptial gifts. Females tend to get paler towards the end of summer. The stripe along the back of the body can be found in all spiders and can be seen as crypsis, a protective measure against predators.

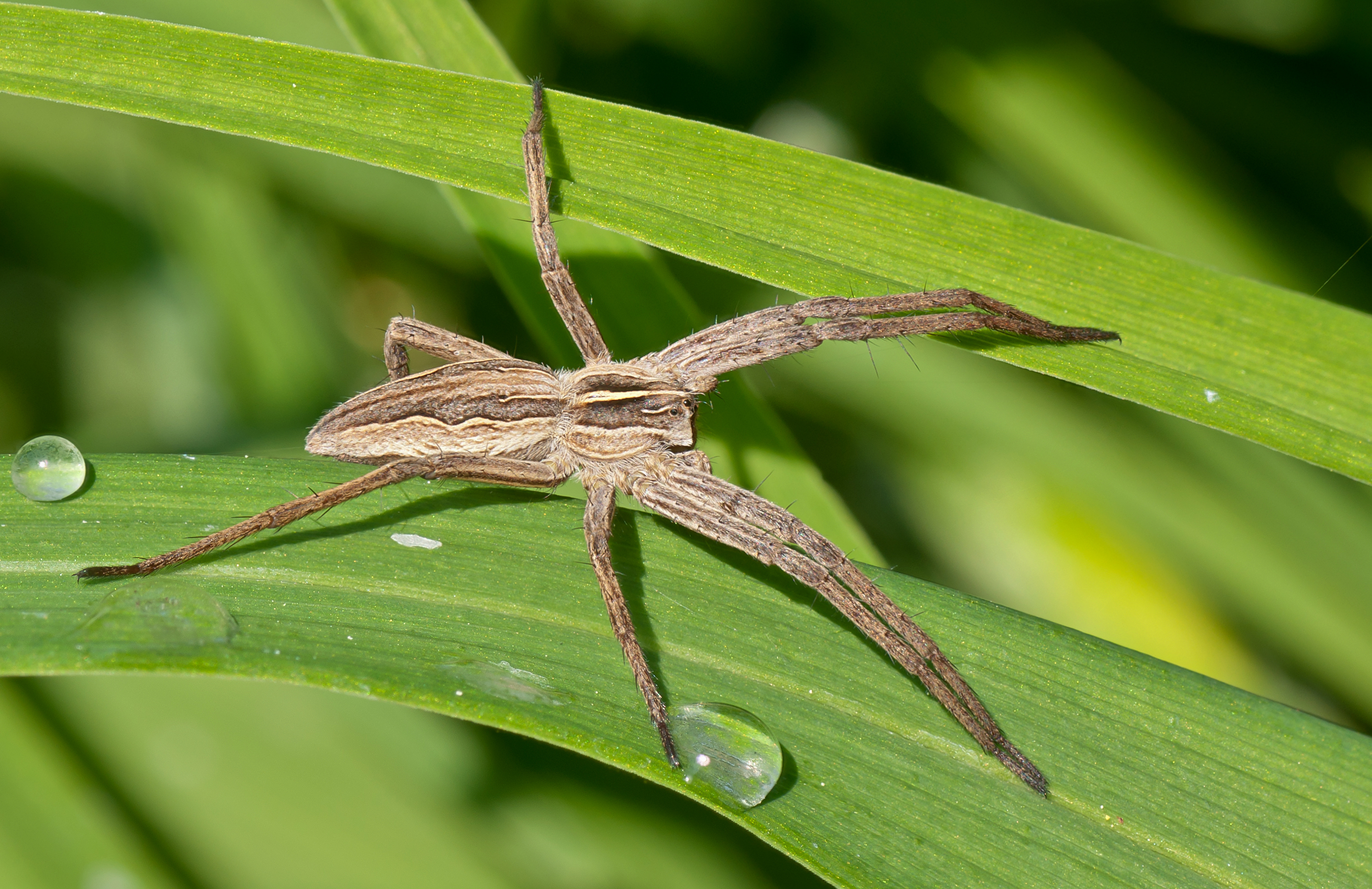

The pedipalps in nymphs and females look similar to legs. In males, this structure gets thicker towards the end and is used to store sperm until reproduction (bulbus). The outer chelicerae segment consists of three teeth. They catch their prey during the day and at night and are also active on warm winter days.

== Habitat and distribution ==
Pisaura mirabilis has a palearctic distribution, and can be found all over Europe. These spiders inhabit the Canary Islands and Madeira, the Asian part of Russia, China and North Africa.

P. mirabilis lives in all habitats, but prefers wet environments, such as wet meadows, lowland moors, salt marshes, dunes, the edge of forests, and wet hedges. It inhabits all strata, from the ground to the top of trees, but are not found under rocks or in caves. These spiders can be found at altitudes up to 1100 m.

== Lifestyle ==
The spider develops from a fertilised egg inside a cocoon into an embryo. After inversion, the embryo enters the prelarval stage. A few hours later, the prelarva moults into a larva. At this stage, the spiders are colorless but mobile, and can detect sensory signals from its surrounding. They do not have any eyes yet and their chelicerae are short and sharp. A few fine hairs can be found on their feet.

Depending on the temperature, the larvae moult after 4.5 – 7.5 days into the first nymphal stage. Once leaving the cocoon through an opening, they live in a protective web made by the mother, where they feed on the leftover yolk from their eggs and drink from water droplets. After about a week, the nymphs start suspending themselves from their own spider silk and start preying on fruit flies. This usually happens in the sixth or seventh nymphal stage. Cannibalism does not occur in the first few days, but occurs in later stages. The whole nymphal stage is divided into 12 stages at most. Male spiders become sexually mature in the 9th to 11th stages, females in the 10th to 12th stages. Temperature can influence the development and number of stages, with colder temperatures slowing down the process. Under good conditions, spiders can complete their nymphal development in fewer than 12 stages. The duration from prelarval stage to final moult (maturity) typically lasts 257 days for males (stage 10) and 289 days for females (stage 11). Adulthood is the period after final moult till death. Females live longer than males, the record being 247 days for females and 186.5 days for males.

Depending on habitat, nursery web spiders hibernate once or twice during the nymphal stage. The period of hibernation (diapause) is spent in ground vegetation under leaves, moss, and stones. They can be found in garages and houses, as well. Some individuals in the south of France have been found under loose bark of the plane tree. The nymphs in stages 6 to 8 start hibernating in November and continue with their development towards the end of February to the beginning of March.

Pisaura mirabilis in Western and Central Europe reach sexual maturity in May, when sperm uptake, the search for females, offering of nuptial gifts, and courtship and mating takes place. In Northern and Eastern Europe, spiders reach sexual maturity only in June, while in Southern Europe, they become sexually mature in April.

Nursery web spiders have a one-year annual cycle in southern Europe. They grow in summer, hibernate in winter, reach adulthood in spring, and reproduce and then die in autumn. Their offspring are sexually mature in the following spring. Spiders from the north have a two-year cycle, having to go through two hibernations before reaching sexual maturity. Spiders in Western and Central Europe have a mix of both one- and two-year cycles. Males have a two-month period to reproduce; females three and a half.

== Mating system ==
Males of this species offer a nuptial gift to potential female mates. Some Pisaura mirabilis specimens have also been observed to use thanatosis during courtship. After presenting the nuptial gift to the female, she bites on to the gift and the male moves to her epigyne to deposit sperm with his pedipalps. Throughout copulation, the male keeps a leg on the gift so as to be ready if she tries to escape with it or attack him. At this time, the male may feign death – his limbs become straight and he is dragged along with the female while holding on to the gift. When the female stops, the male slowly "resurrects" and continues attempting to mate. Thanatosis in P. mirabilis has been observed to significantly increase the male's odds of successfully copulating from less than 30% to 89%.

== Predators, parasites, and pathogens ==
Predators of Pisaura mirabilis includes spider wasps, tree frogs, lizards, and song birds during the day, and toads, shrews, and bats at night. Other spider species, as well as from the same species (cannibalism), consider P. mirabilis as prey.

Nursery web spiders are often parasitised by nematodes, parasitic wasps, and Acari. These parasites infect the spider and its eggs and cocoons, which can lead to destruction of a whole clutch of eggs.

Baculoviridae and Rickettsia species infect nursery web spiders, as well. They most likely enter the gastrointestinal tract via the spiders' prey. Not only can nymphs and adults be infected, but different stages in the cocoon are infected, as well.

== See also ==
- Spider families
