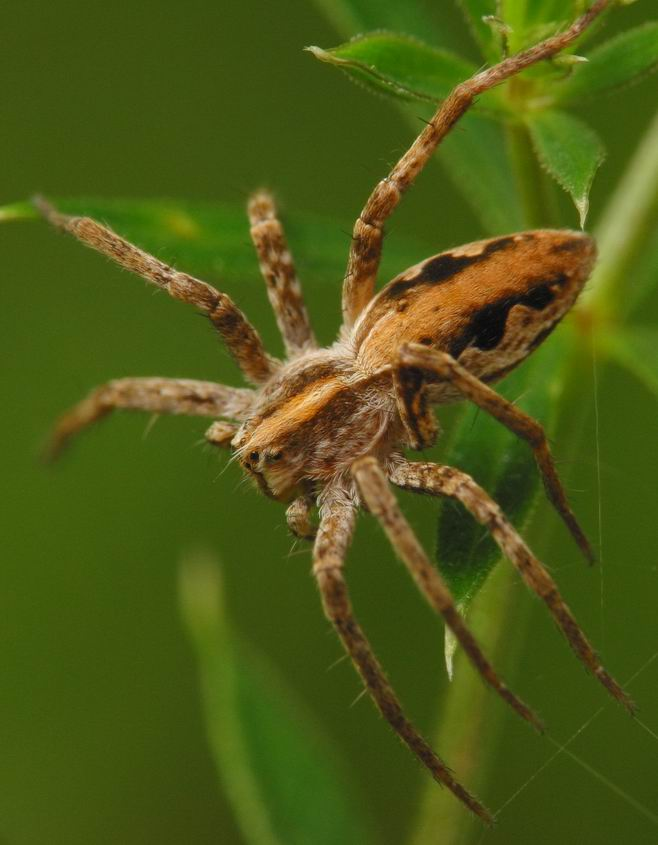
- P. mirabilis

Scientific classification
- Kingdom: Animalia
- Phylum: Arthropoda
- Subphylum: Chelicerata
- Class: Arachnida
- Order: Araneae
- Infraorder: Araneomorphae
- Family: Pisauridae
- Genus: Pisaura; Simon, 1886

Species
- See text.

Diversity
- 13 species

= Pisaura =

Genus of spiders

Pisaura is a genus of Eurasian spiders in the family Pisauridae.

== Description ==
Pisaura (at least the European species) vary in colouration from yellow and bright brown to mostly red-brown and grey or black. A distinct, bright stripe runs down the middle of the prosoma. The opisthosoma is long, slender and tapering posteriorly. On the dorsal surface of the opisthosoma is a wide, jagged stripe with dark margins. The posterior cheliceral furrow margin has two or three teeth.

== Ecology ==
Spiders of this genus are hunters on the ground or on vegetation.

== Taxonomy ==
The genus name Pisaura was first published by Eugène Simon in 1886. In 1757, Carl Alexander Clerck had described a species of spider under the name Araneus mirabilis; later authors placed the species either in Dolomedes or more usually in Ocyale. Simon stated that the type species of Ocyale was entirely different from "Ocyale mirabilis", so placed the species in a new genus as Pisaura mirabilis. In the same publication, Simon also described Pisaura valida, later placed in Afropisaura as Afropisaura valida.

=== Species ===
As of September 2025, the World Spider Catalog accepted the following species:

- Pisaura acoreensis Wunderlich, 1992 – Azores
- Pisaura anahitiformis Kishida, 1910 – Japan
- Pisaura ancora Paik, 1969 – Russia (South Siberia, Far East), China, Korea
- Pisaura bicornis Zhang & Song, 1992 – China, Japan
- Pisaura consocia (O. Pickard-Cambridge, 1872) – Cyprus, Turkey, Israel, Lebanon, Syria
- Pisaura lama Bösenberg & Strand, 1906 – Russia (Far East), China, Korea, Japan
- Pisaura mirabilis (Clerck, 1757) (type species) – Europe, Turkey, Middle East, Caucasus, Russia (Europe to Middle Siberia), Central Asia, China
- Pisaura novicia (L. Koch, 1878) – Mediterranean to Central Asia, India
- Pisaura orientalis Kulczyński, 1913 – Mediterranean
- Pisaura podilensis Patel & Reddy, 1990 – India
- Pisaura quadrilineata (Lucas, 1838) – Canary Islands, Madeira
- Pisaura sublama Zhang, 2000 – China
- Pisaura swamii Patel, 1987 – India

== Gallery ==
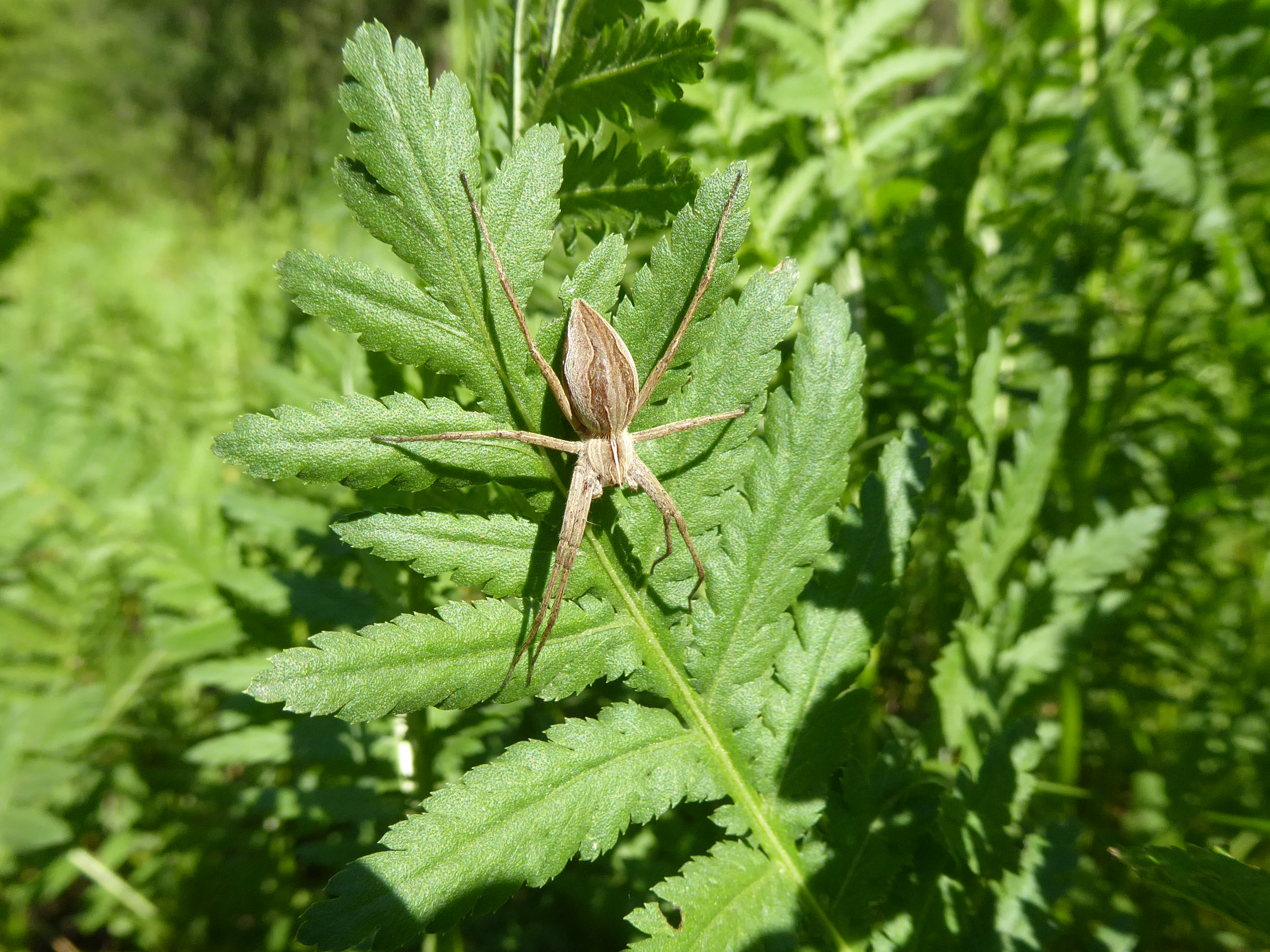
Pisaura sp. female, Italy

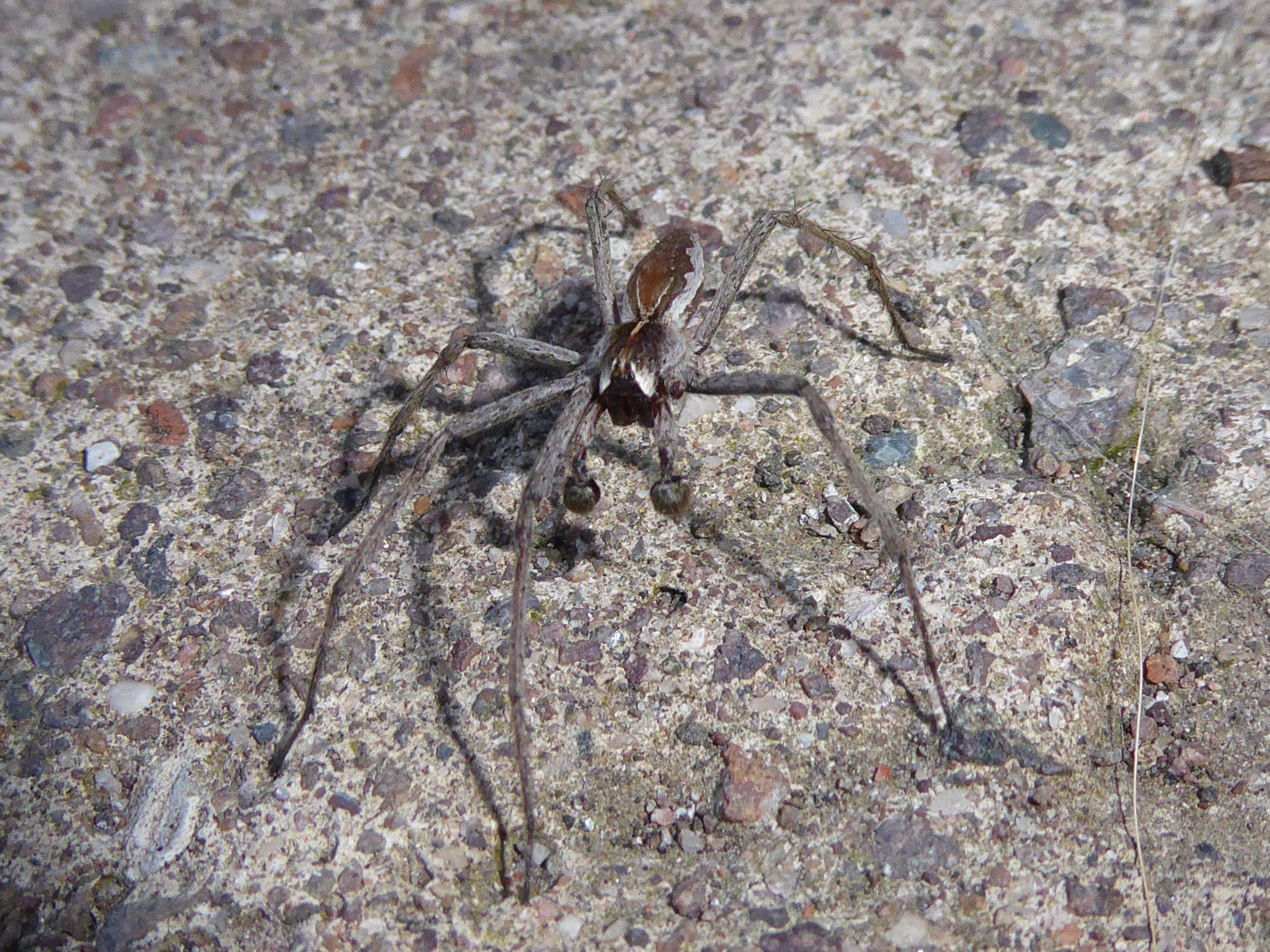
Pisaura cf mirabilis male, Italy

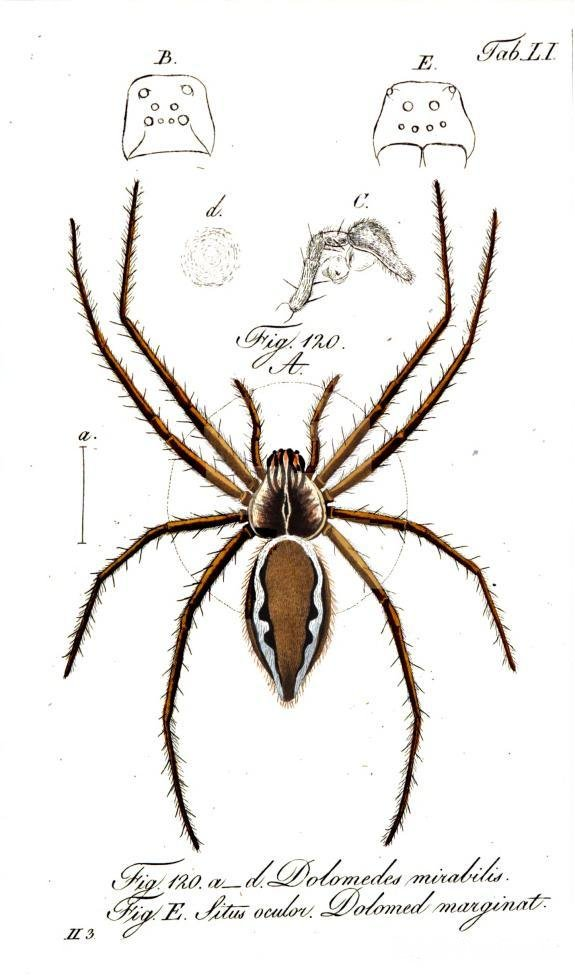
Pisaura mirabilis diagram
