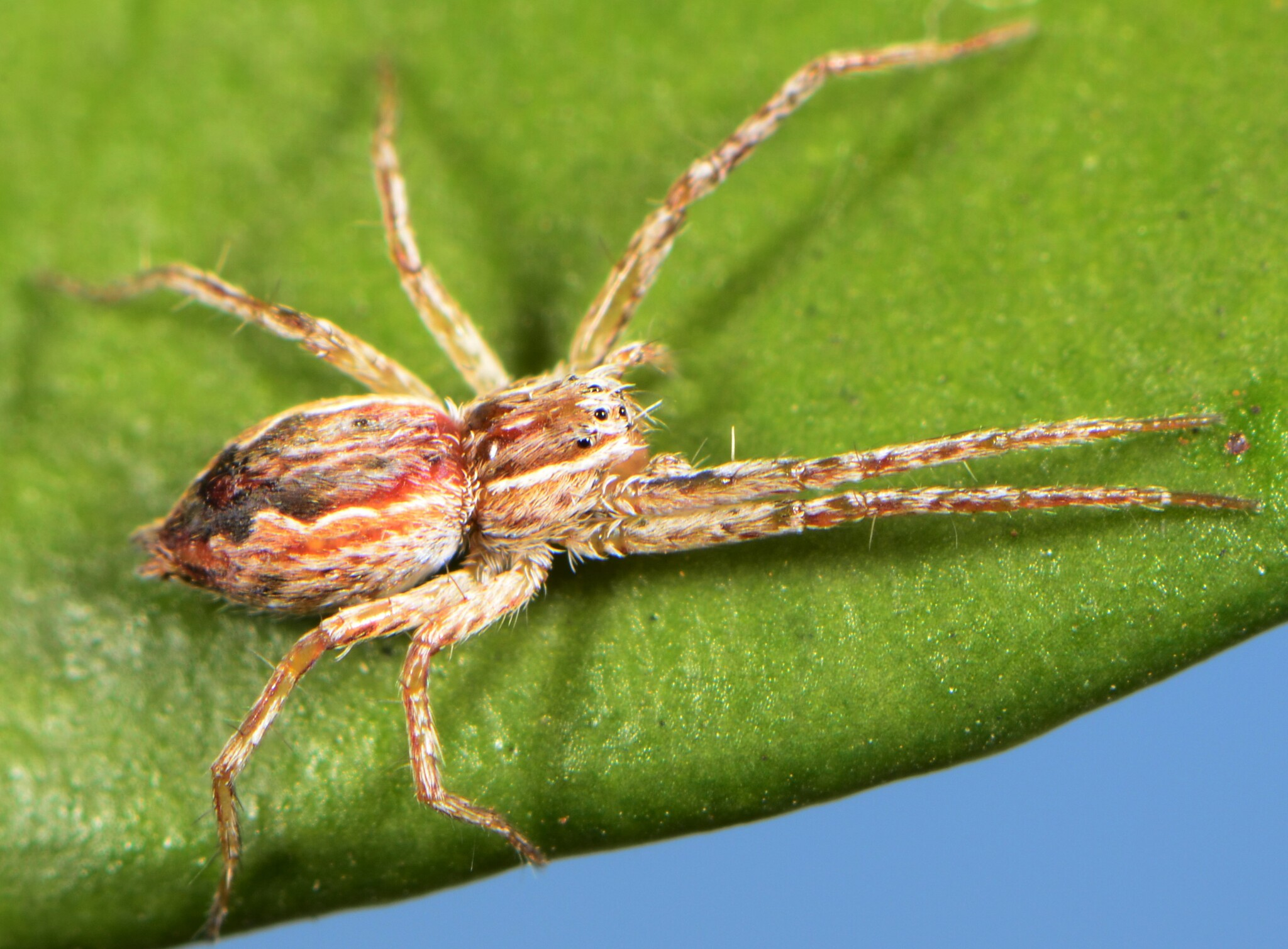
- female A. rothiformis
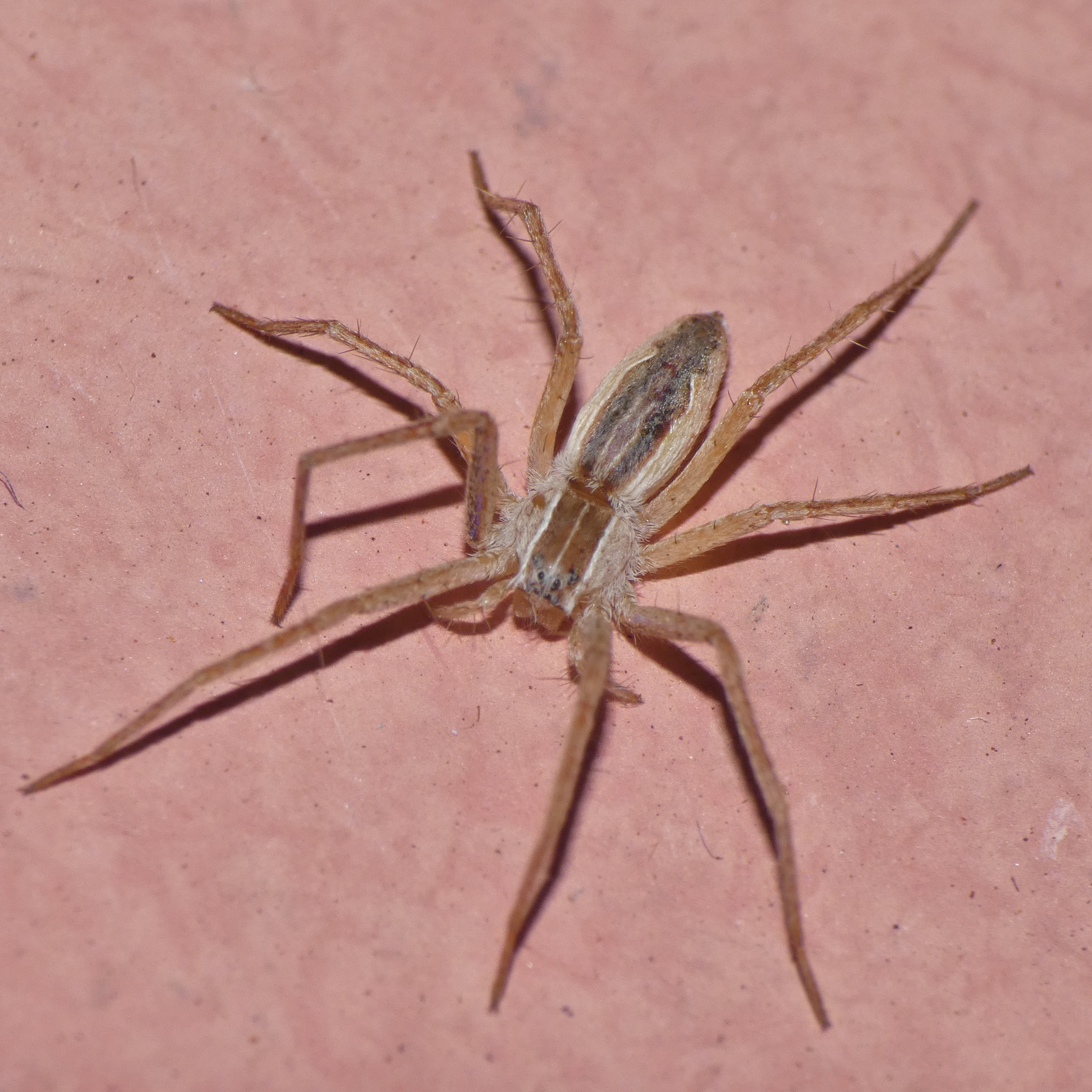
- A. ducis

Scientific classification
- Kingdom: Animalia
- Phylum: Arthropoda
- Subphylum: Chelicerata
- Class: Arachnida
- Order: Araneae
- Infraorder: Araneomorphae
- Family: Pisauridae
- Genus: Afropisaura; Blandin, 1976

Type species
- A. valida (Simon, 1886)

Species
- A. ducis (Strand, 1913); A. rothiformis (Strand, 1908); A. valida (Simon, 1886)

= Afropisaura =

Genus of spiders

Afropisaura is a genus of African nursery web spiders that was first described by P. Blandin in 1976. Its three described species are found in Africa.

== Description ==
Females measure 9 to 14 mm in body length, while males range from 11 to 13 mm, with males having longer legs than females. The carapace is as wide as long and narrower in the eye region. Eight eyes are arranged in two rows, with the anterior eye row slightly procurved and the posterior row recurved. The posterior row is slightly wider than the anterior row, and the anterior median eyes are smallest. The chelicerae bear three equally-sized cheliceral teeth.

The abdomen is elongated, tapering towards the back, and usually bears plumose setae. The legs have three claws and are relatively long, sometimes slightly laterigrade. Setae are present on the patellae, femora, tibiae and metatarsi. The tarsi have trichobothria arranged in two rows or scattered. The trochanters are deeply notched.

== Taxonomy ==
The genus Afropisaura was described by Blandin in 1976. Species were formerly placed in the genus Pisaura. The genus has been revised by Blandin (1976) and Sierwald (1997), though specimens from southern Africa were not included in the revision.

== Species ==
As of October 2025, this genus includes three species:

- Afropisaura ducis (Strand, 1913) – West, Central, East Africa, South Africa
- Afropisaura rothiformis (Strand, 1908) – Nigeria, Cameroon, Ethiopia, Somalia, DR Congo, Uganda, Burundi, Tanzania, Angola, South Africa
- Afropisaura valida (Simon, 1886) – West, Central Africa (type species)
