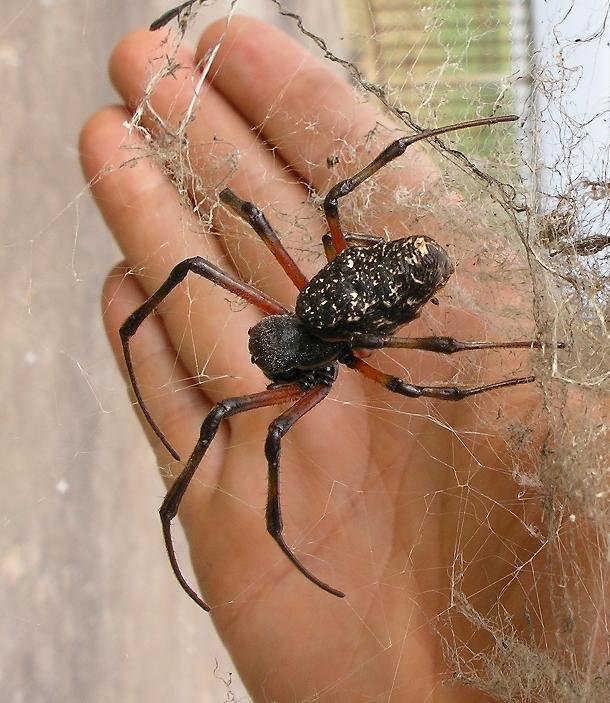
- Female in Mozambique
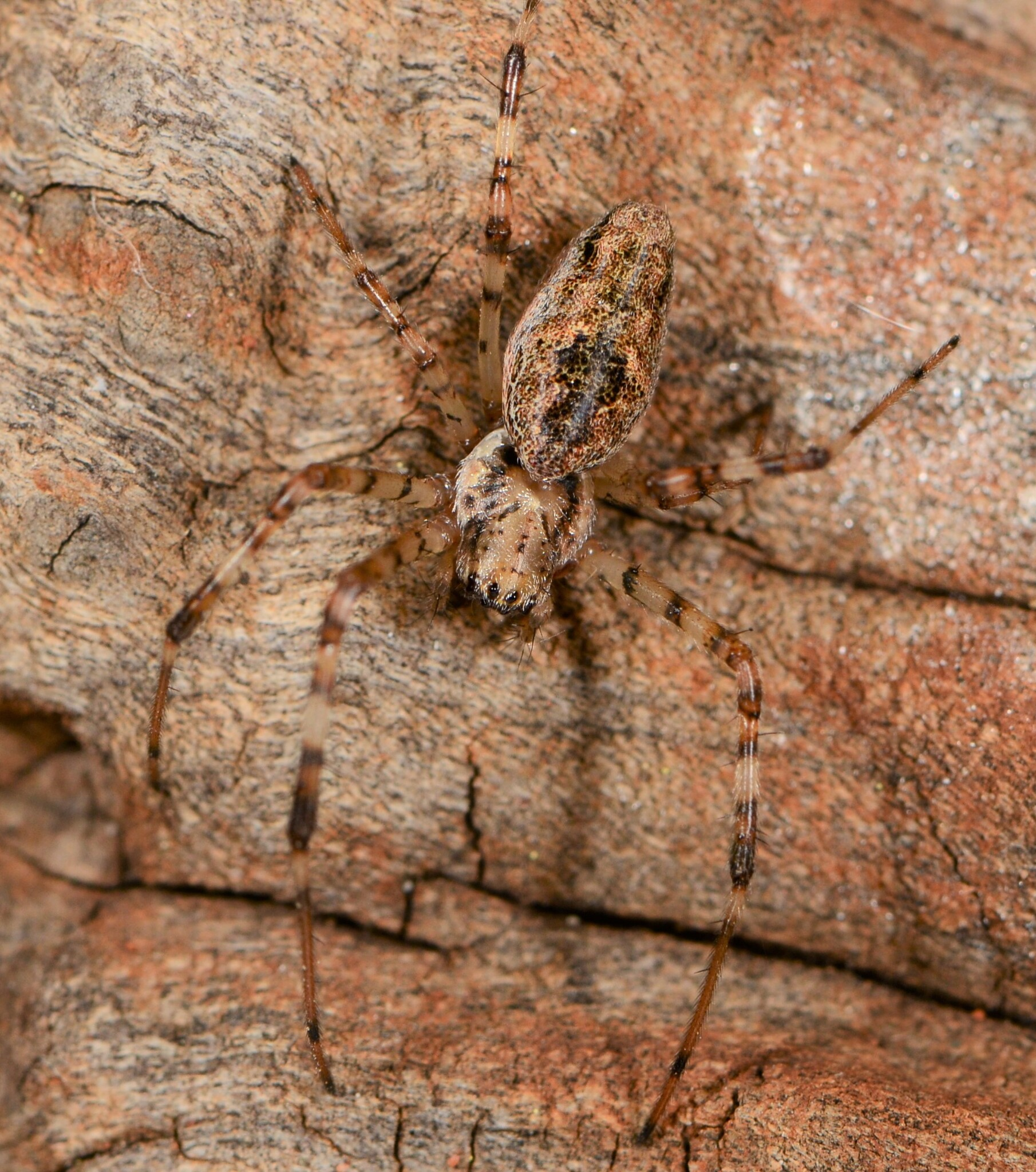
- Juvenile in South Africa

Scientific classification
- Kingdom: Animalia
- Phylum: Arthropoda
- Subphylum: Chelicerata
- Class: Arachnida
- Order: Araneae
- Infraorder: Araneomorphae
- Family: Nephilidae
- Genus: Nephilingis
- Species: N. cruentata

Binomial name
- Nephilingis cruentata (Fabricius, 1775)
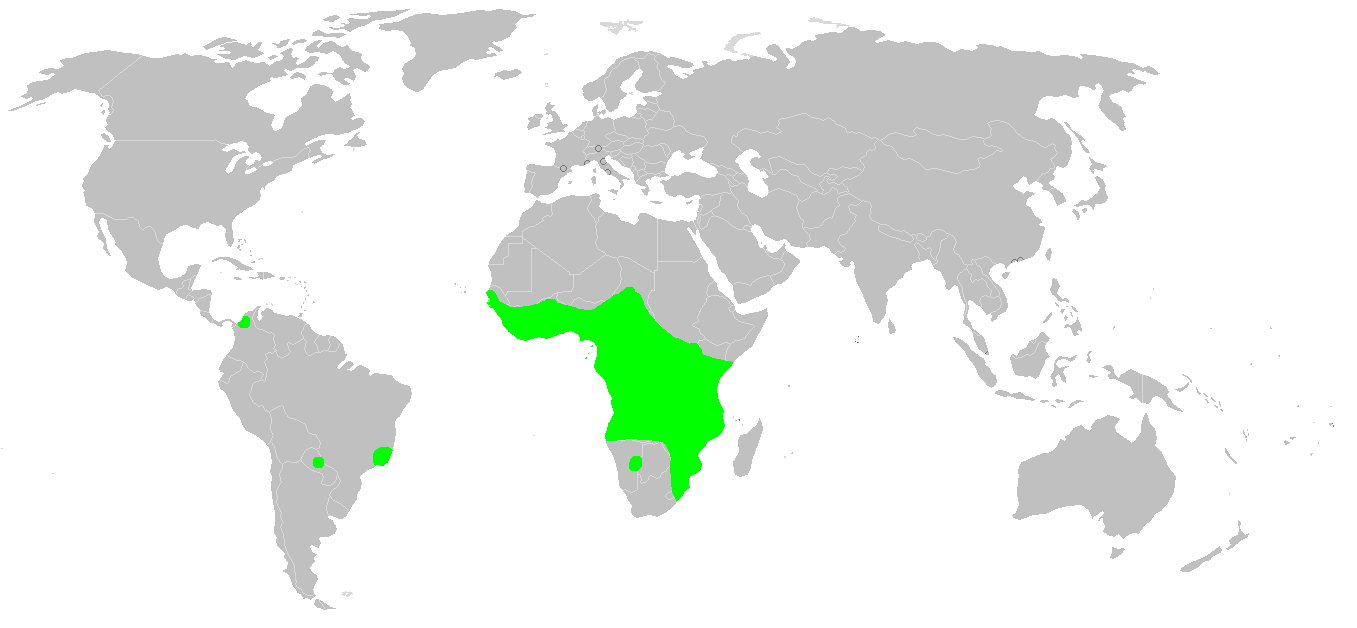

Synonyms
- Aranea cruentata Fabricius, 1775; Epeira diadela Walckenaer, 1841; Epeira brasiliensis Walckenaer, 1841; Epeira azzara Walckenaer, 1841; Nephilengys genualis Gerstaecker, 1873; Nephila brasiliensis Bertkau, 1880; Nephilengys cruentata Simon, 1887; Araneus diadelus Petrunkevitch, 1911

= Nephilingis cruentata =

Species of spider

Nephilingis cruentata, commonly referred to as the African hermit spider, is an nephilid spider with a strikingly red sternum.

== Distribution ==
N. cruentata is found in tropical and subtropical Africa and several limited areas of South America (Brazil, northern Colombia and Paraguay), where it has probably been introduced by humans in the late 19th century at the latest.

== Habitat and ecology ==
In South Africa, the species inhabits multiple biomes including Grassland, Indian Ocean Coastal Belt, Forest and Savanna biomes. Nephilingis cruentata builds asymmetrical white orb-webs, often against tree trunks, walls or large rocks with a funnel-shaped retreat on the side. The spiders are frequently found under the overhangs of roofs. The webs are large, measuring 1-1.5 m in diameter.

== Description ==
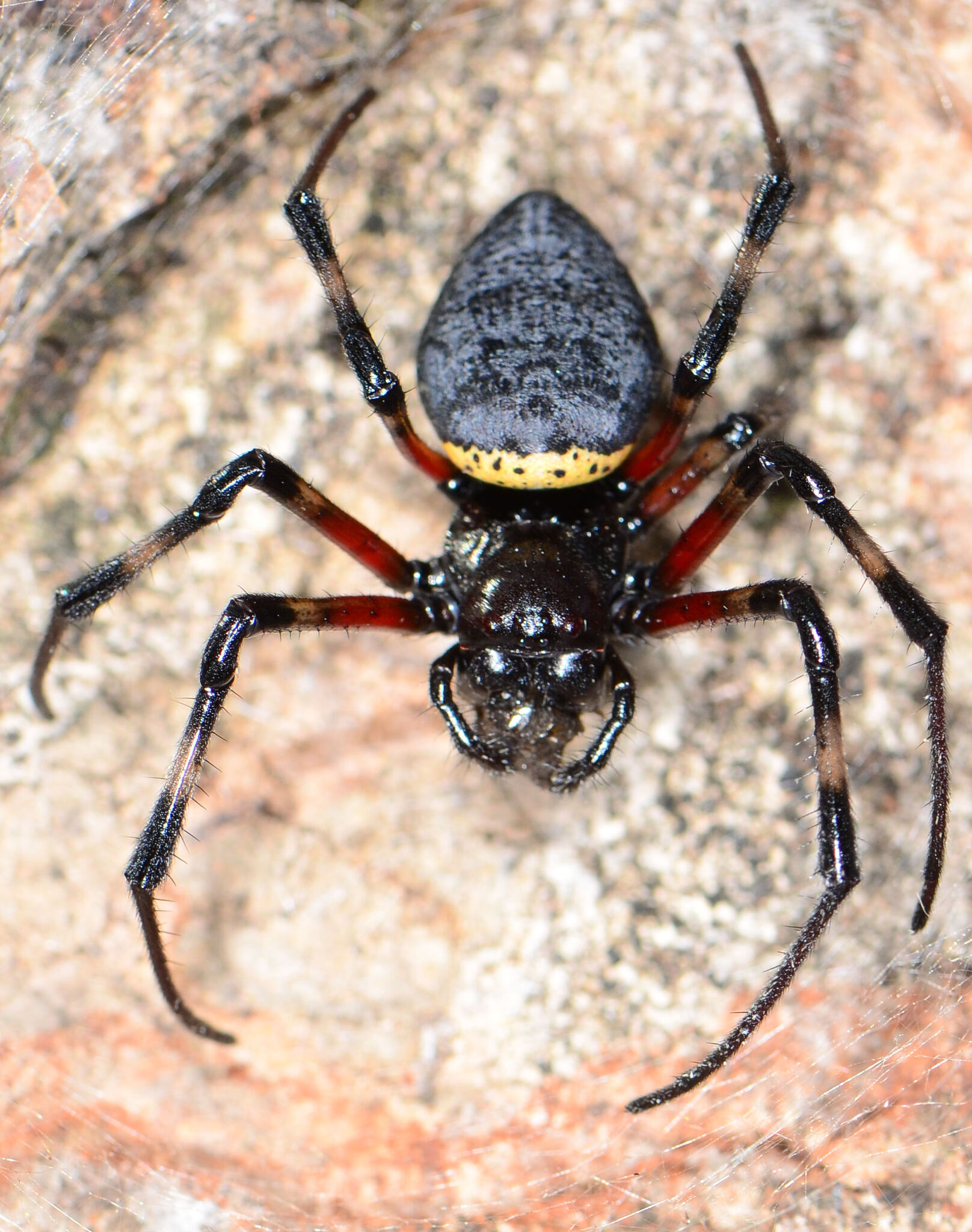
female

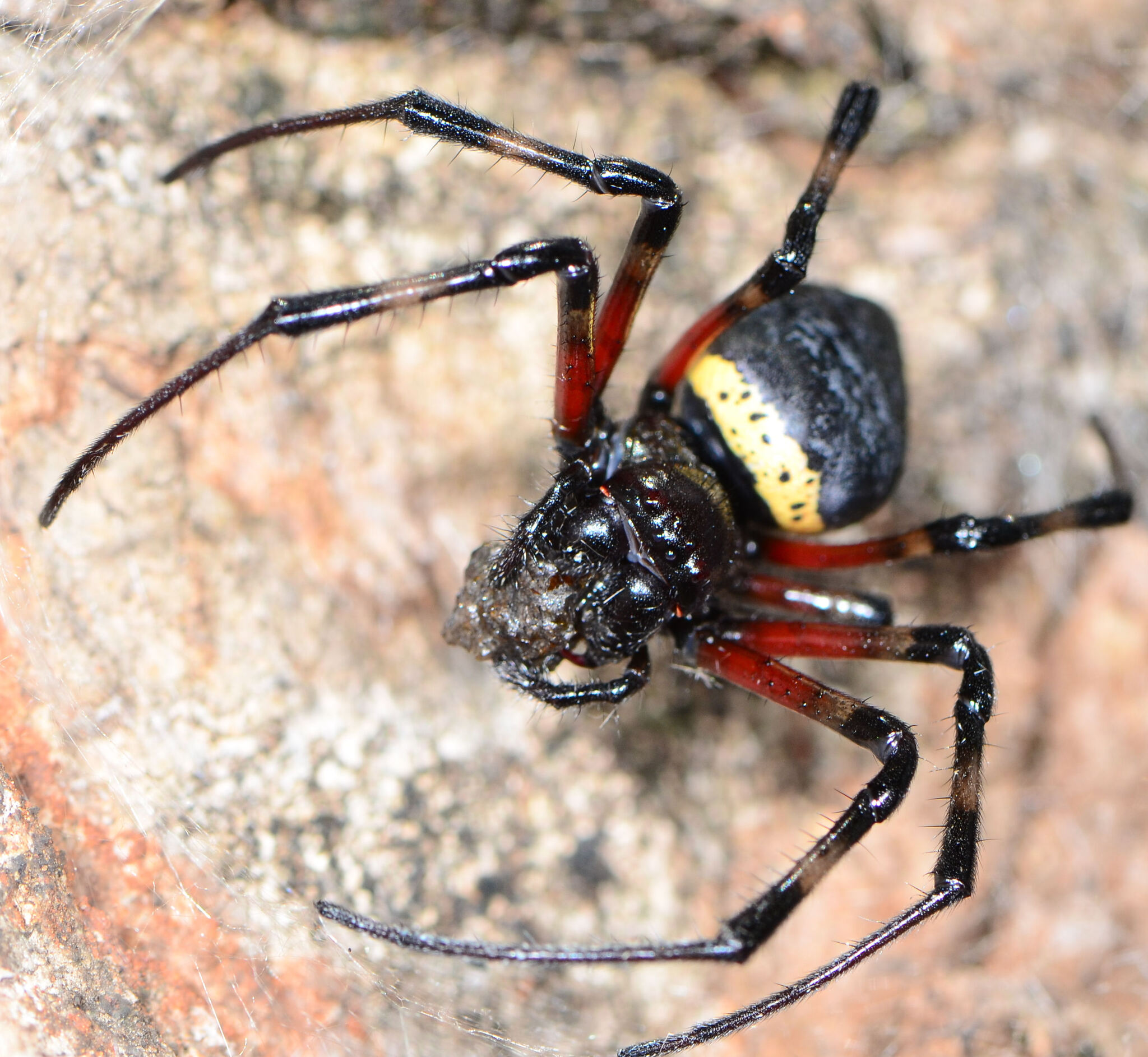

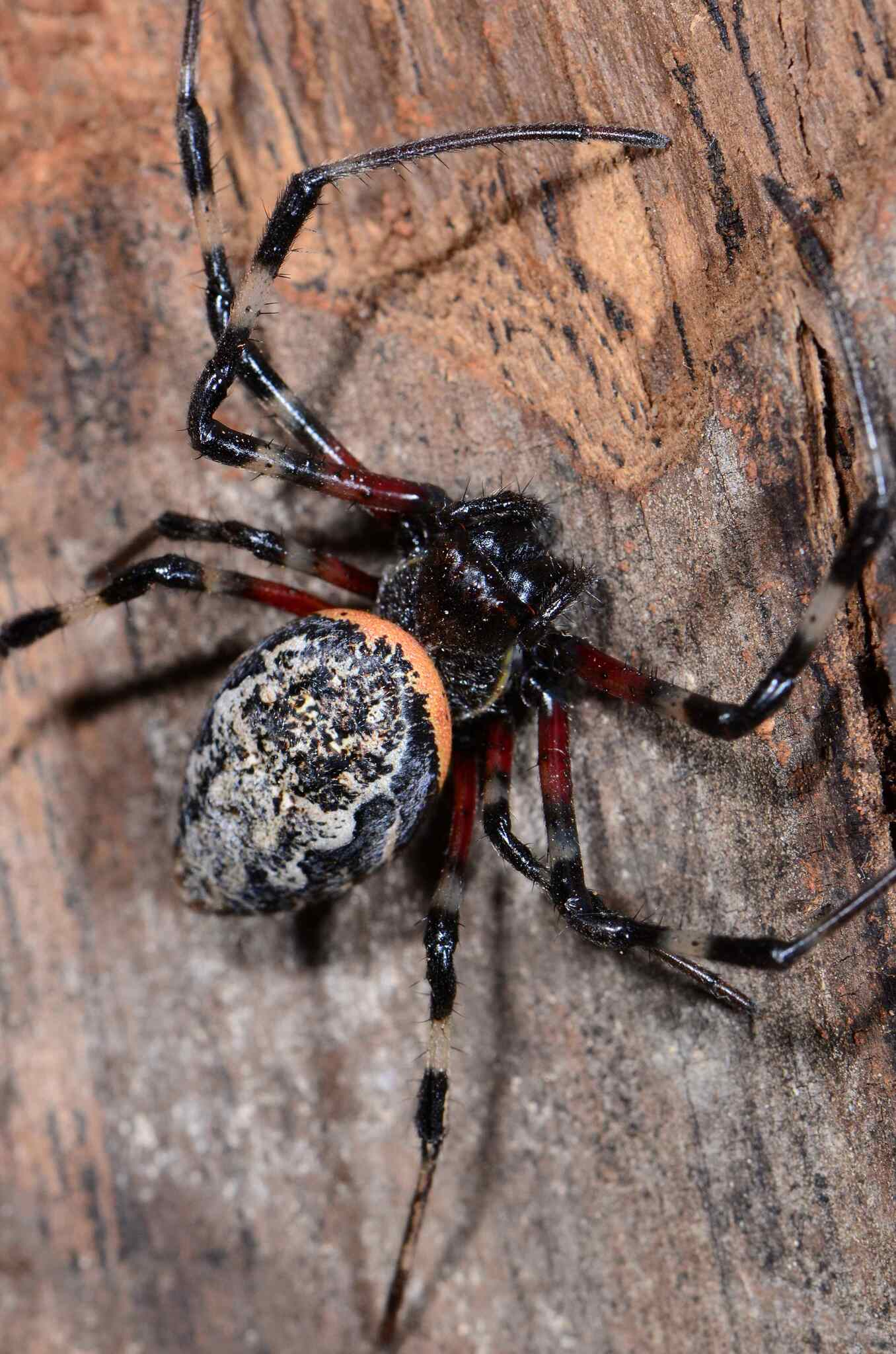
another female

Females reach a length of 20-25 mm. Males are typically no longer than 5 mm. The legs can be uniformly dark red or brown, or annulated.

This species is strikingly sexually dimorphic, with females boasting a large, heart-shaped ophistosoma often found to be an olive-brown, cream, and/or earthy grey. Males however, are small and brown, sharing a less dramatic yet similarly shaped ophistosoma with their female counterparts.

In distinguishing nephilingis cruentata from the related golden orb weaver, these spiders will have an apparent reddish-orange marking on their underside.

== Name ==
The species name cruentata is derived from Latin cruentus "bloody", referring to the female red sternum.

== Taxonomy ==
The species was first described in 1775 by Johan Fabricius, as Araneus cruentata. In 1887, Eugène Simon transferred it to the genus Nephilengys. In 2013, species:Matjaž Kuntner et al. decided that four species of Nephilengys were sufficiently different to require an alternative generic placement. Accordingly, they erected the genus Nephilingis with Nephilingis cruentata as the type species.

== Conservation ==
Nephilingis cruentata is listed as Least Concern by the South African National Biodiversity Institute due to its wide geographical range and common occurrence. The species is protected in eight protected areas including Ophathe Game Reserve and Ndumo Game Reserve. There are no significant threats to the species.
