= Nephilingis dodo =

Scientific classification
- Kingdom: Animalia
- Phylum: Arthropoda
- Subphylum: Chelicerata
- Class: Arachnida
- Order: Araneae
- Infraorder: Araneomorphae
- Family: Nephilidae
- Genus: Nephilingis
- Species: N. dodo

Binomial name
- Nephilingis dodo (Kuntner & Agnarsson, 2011)

Synonyms
- Nephilengys dodo

Species of spider

Nephilingis dodo is an nephilid spider endemic to Mauritius. It was found to be separate from the related species Nephilingis borbonica in 2011.

== Anatomy ==
=== Female ===
The abdomen is strikingly white. Females reach a length of about 23mm.

=== Male ===
Only 5 to 6 mm in length, males have a grey abdomen with white spots and a yellow-brown sternum.

== Distribution ==
N. dodo is endemic to Mauritius, where it inhabits the native forests.

== Name ==
Named after the vernacular of the extinct flightless bird from Mauritius, the dodo (Raphus cucullatus). These two species once shared their habitat, the increasingly rare native forests in Mauritius. The specific name, a noun in apposition, is meant to increase awareness of the need for urgent conservation of the Mauritius biota.
