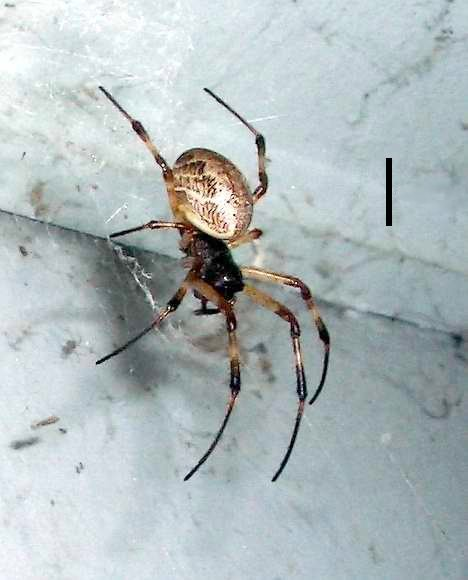
- N. papuana from northern Australia

Scientific classification
- Kingdom: Animalia
- Phylum: Arthropoda
- Subphylum: Chelicerata
- Class: Arachnida
- Order: Araneae
- Infraorder: Araneomorphae
- Family: Nephilidae
- Genus: Nephilengys
- Species: N. papuana

Binomial name
- Nephilengys papuana Thorell, 1881
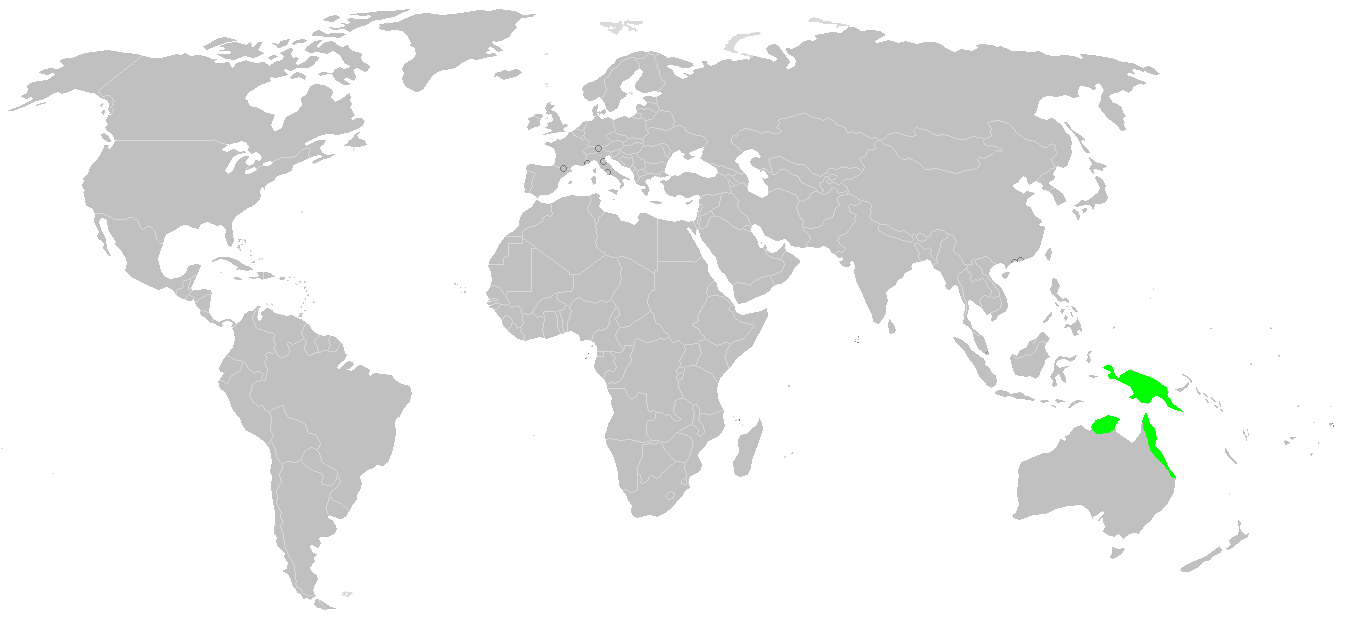

Synonyms
- Nephilengys malabarensis papuana Thorell, 1881; Nephilengys rainbowi Hogg, 1899

= Nephilengys papuana =

Species of spider

Nephilengys papuana is a species of nephilid spider.

== Description ==
The species was previously included in Nephilengys malabarensis as the subspecies N. m. papuana, but is now recognized as a separate species.

Female body length is about 28 mm, male length 6 mm.

Male spiders apparently self-emasculate after copulation.

"At least in Nephilengys, this strategy enables remote copulation, a continuation of sperm transfer after males are detached from copula, which is an additional mechanism to secure eunuch paternity (Li et al. 2012). Although Nephilengys papuana eunuchs have not been subject to experimental testing, early research reported incidents of post-mating emasculation in this species (Robinson and Robinson 1980) and thus its behavior is likely to closely resemble that of its sister species."

== Name ==
The species name is derived from Papua.

== Distribution ==
The species occurs in New Guinea and tropical Australia (Queensland).

== Gallery ==
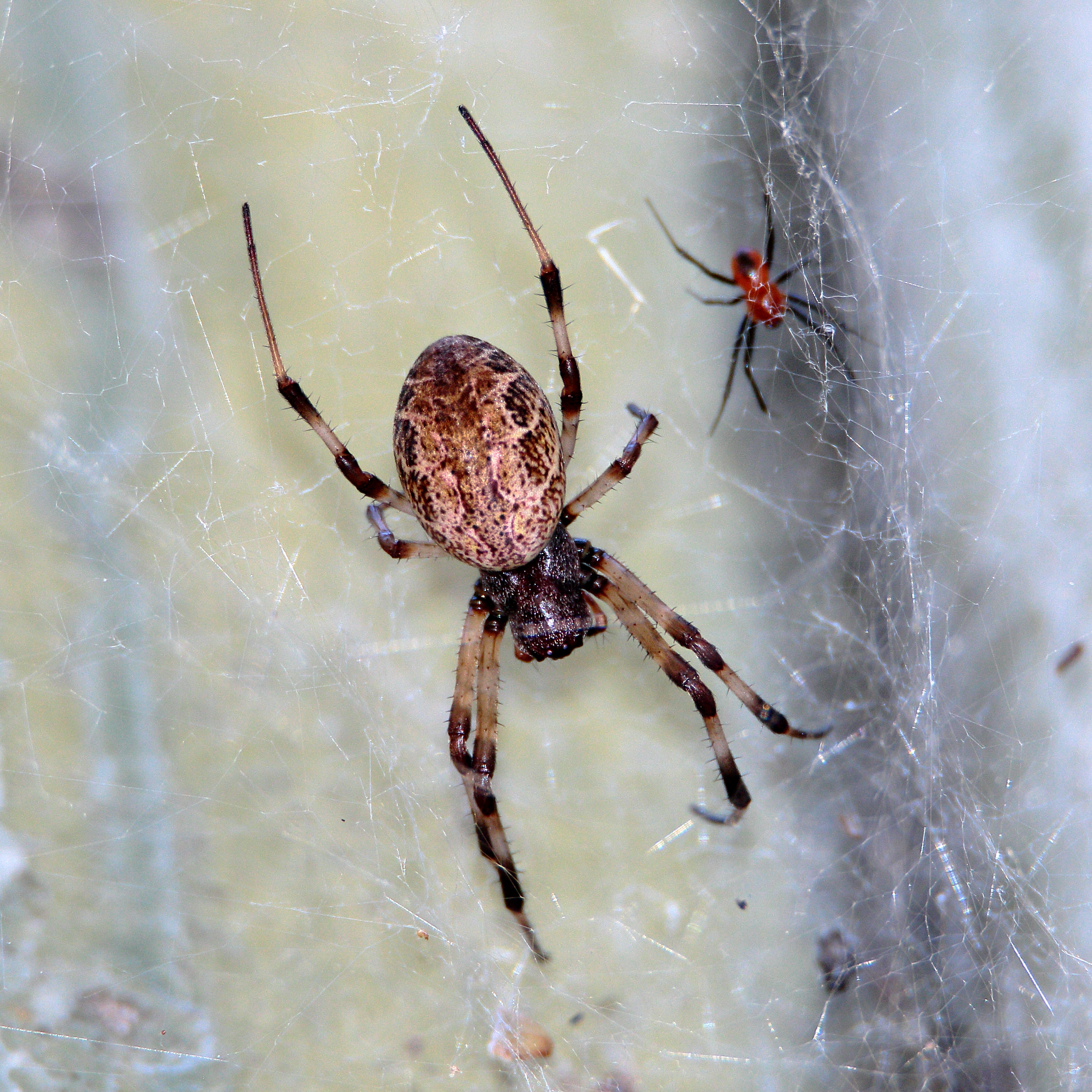
Nephilengys papuana female (centre) and much smaller male (right) taken in Cairns

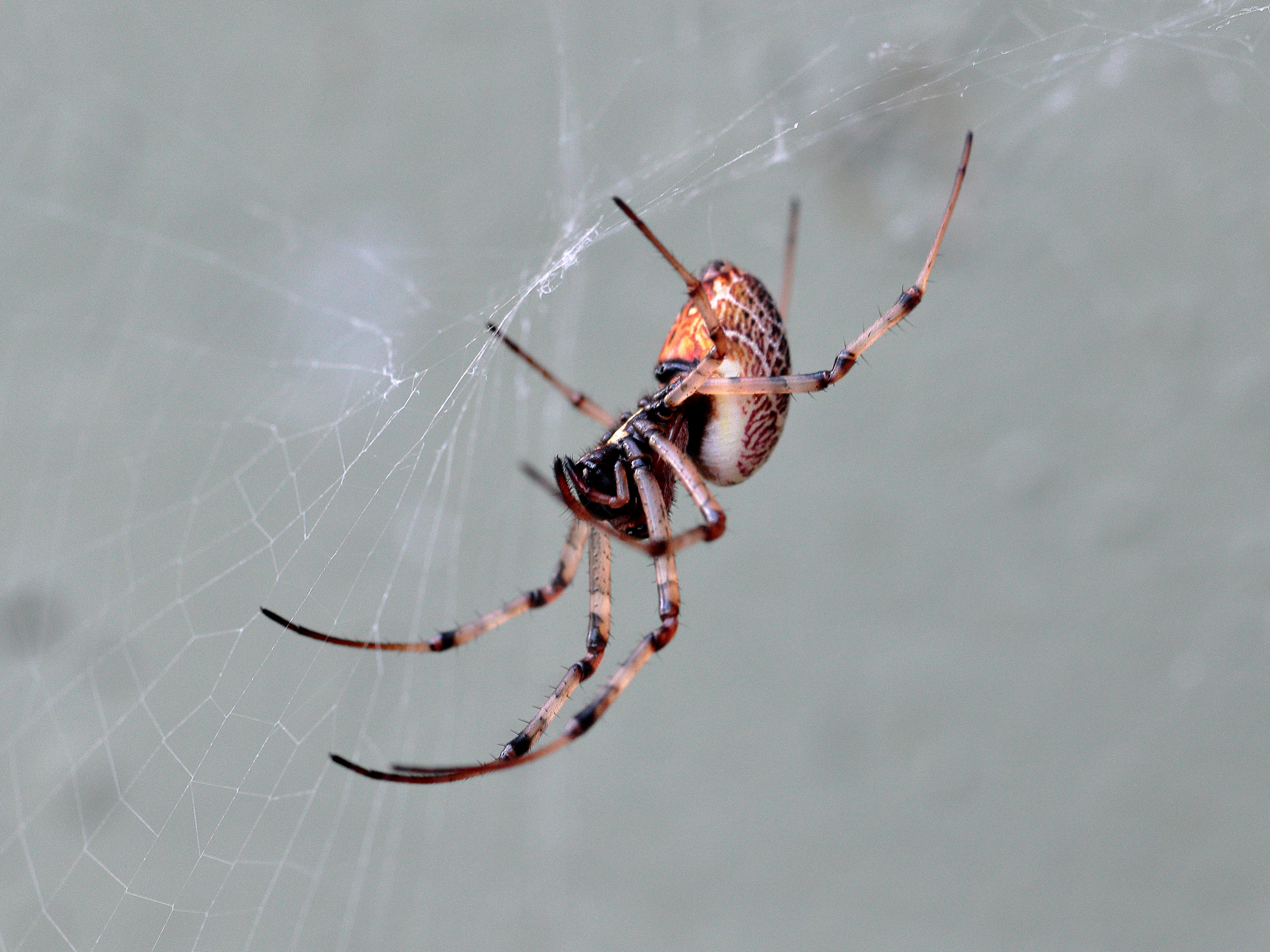
side view of female, Cairns

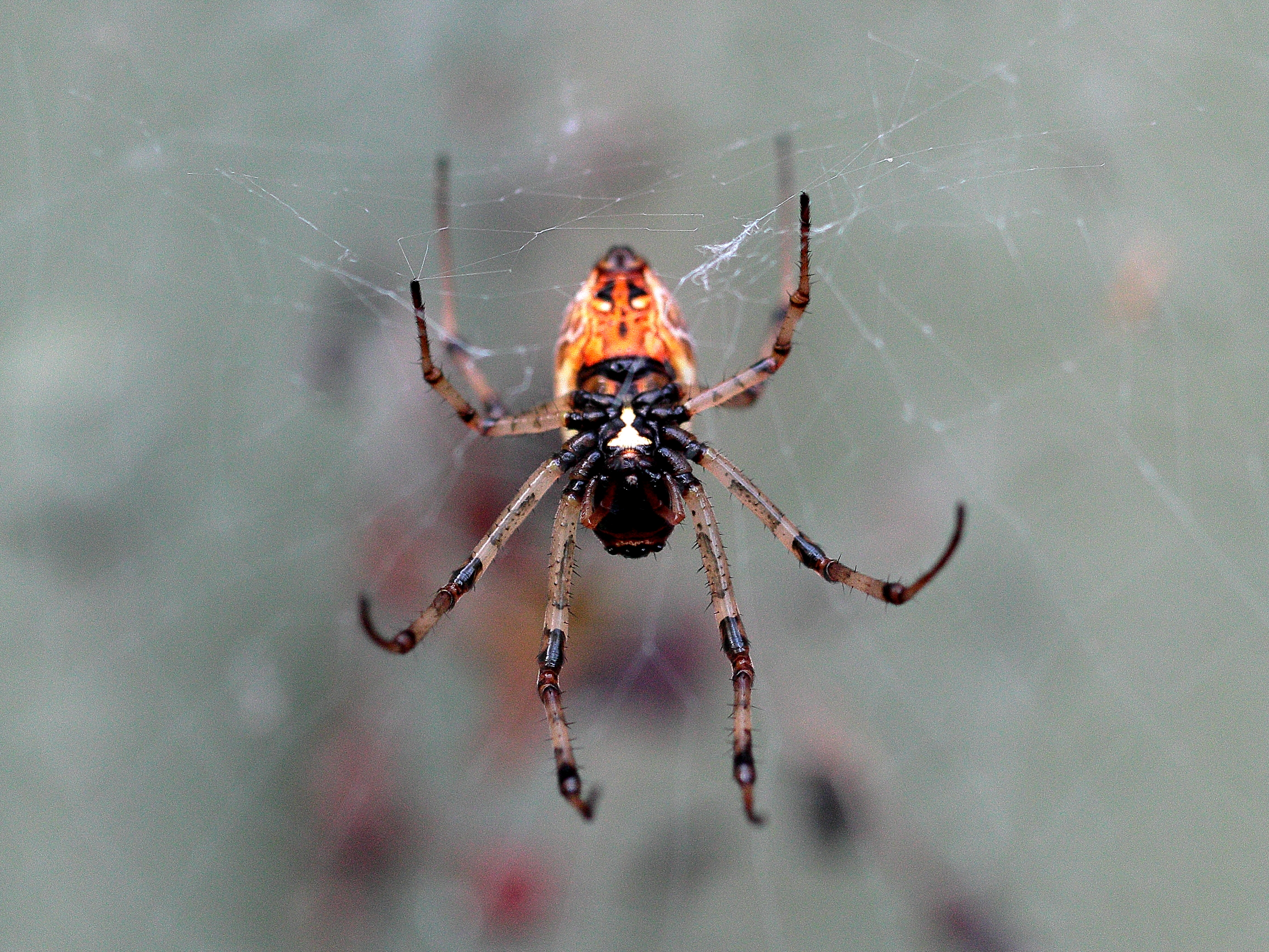
ventral view of female, Cairns

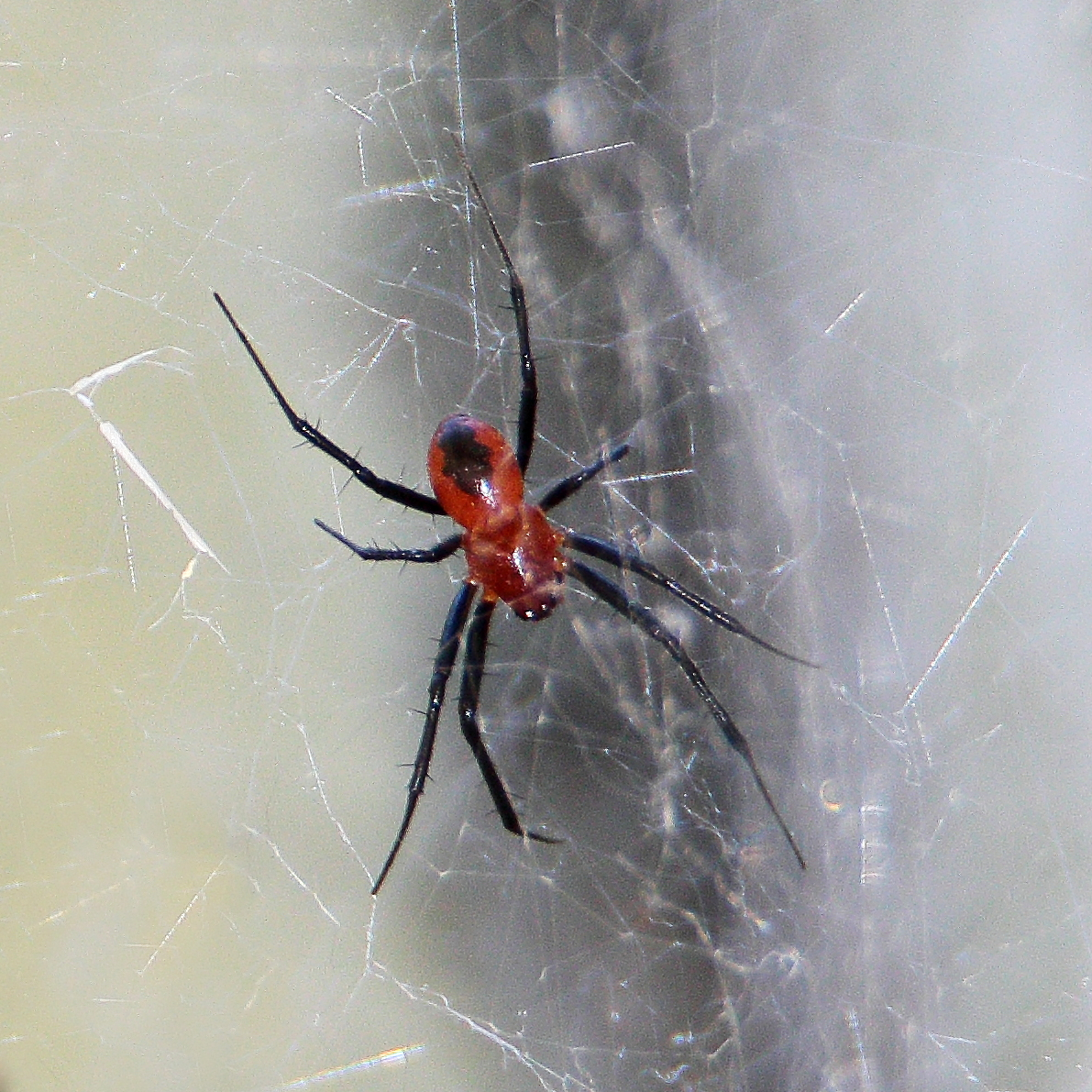
enlarged view of male, Cairns

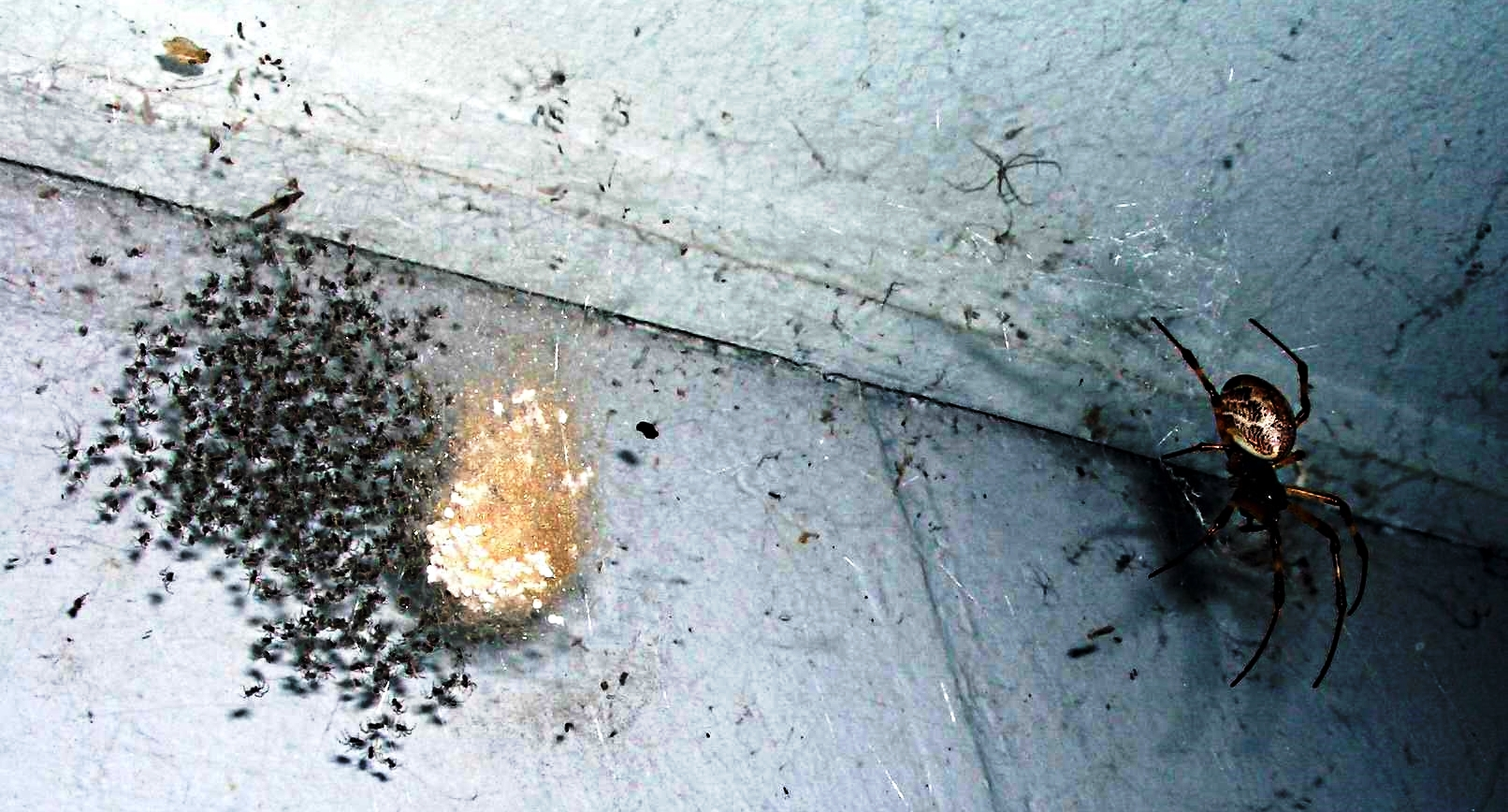
N. papuana with egg sac and spiderlings
