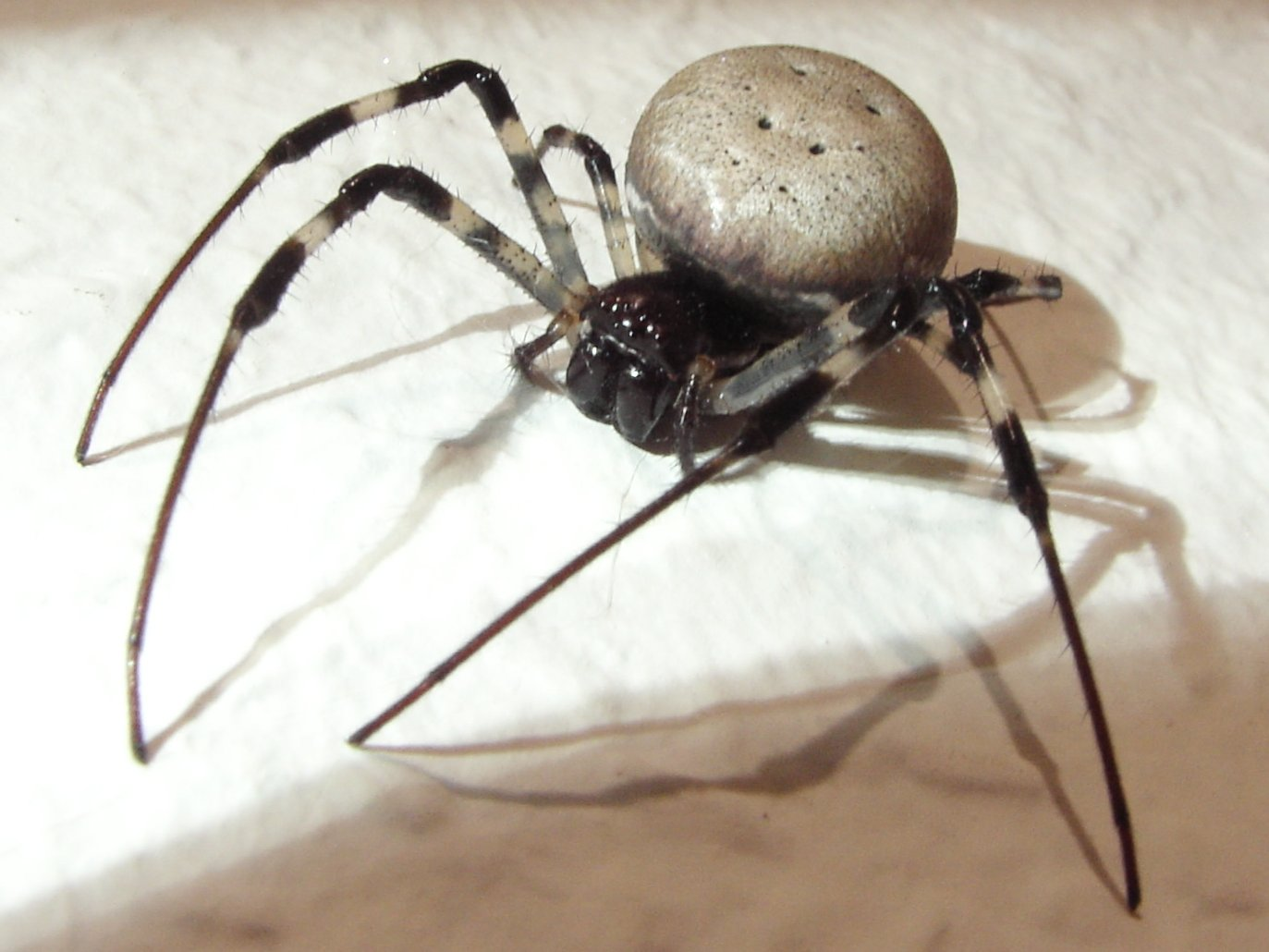
- Female

Scientific classification
- Kingdom: Animalia
- Phylum: Arthropoda
- Subphylum: Chelicerata
- Class: Arachnida
- Order: Araneae
- Infraorder: Araneomorphae
- Family: Nephilidae
- Genus: Nephilingis
- Species: N. livida

Binomial name
- Nephilingis livida (Vinson, 1863)

Synonyms
- Epeira livida; Nephilengys cruentata livida; Nephilengys borbonica livida

= Nephilingis livida =

Species of spider

Nephilingis livida is an nephilid spider from Madagascar and nearby islands. It was found to be separate from the related species Nephilingis borbonica in 2011

== Etymology ==
The species name is derived from Latin "lividus", which can mean "malicious" as well as "bluish".

== Description ==
The color of the female's abdomen ranges from creamy to brown, blue or purple, with a dark brown venter. Females reach a length of about 15 to 24mm Males only reach a length of 3 to 5 mm and have a yellow-brown sternum and a grey abdomen with white dots.

== Distribution ==
N. livida occurs in Madagascar and surrounding islands, such as the Comoro Islands and Seychelles (including the Aldabra atoll). They are common in human dwellings in Madagascar.
