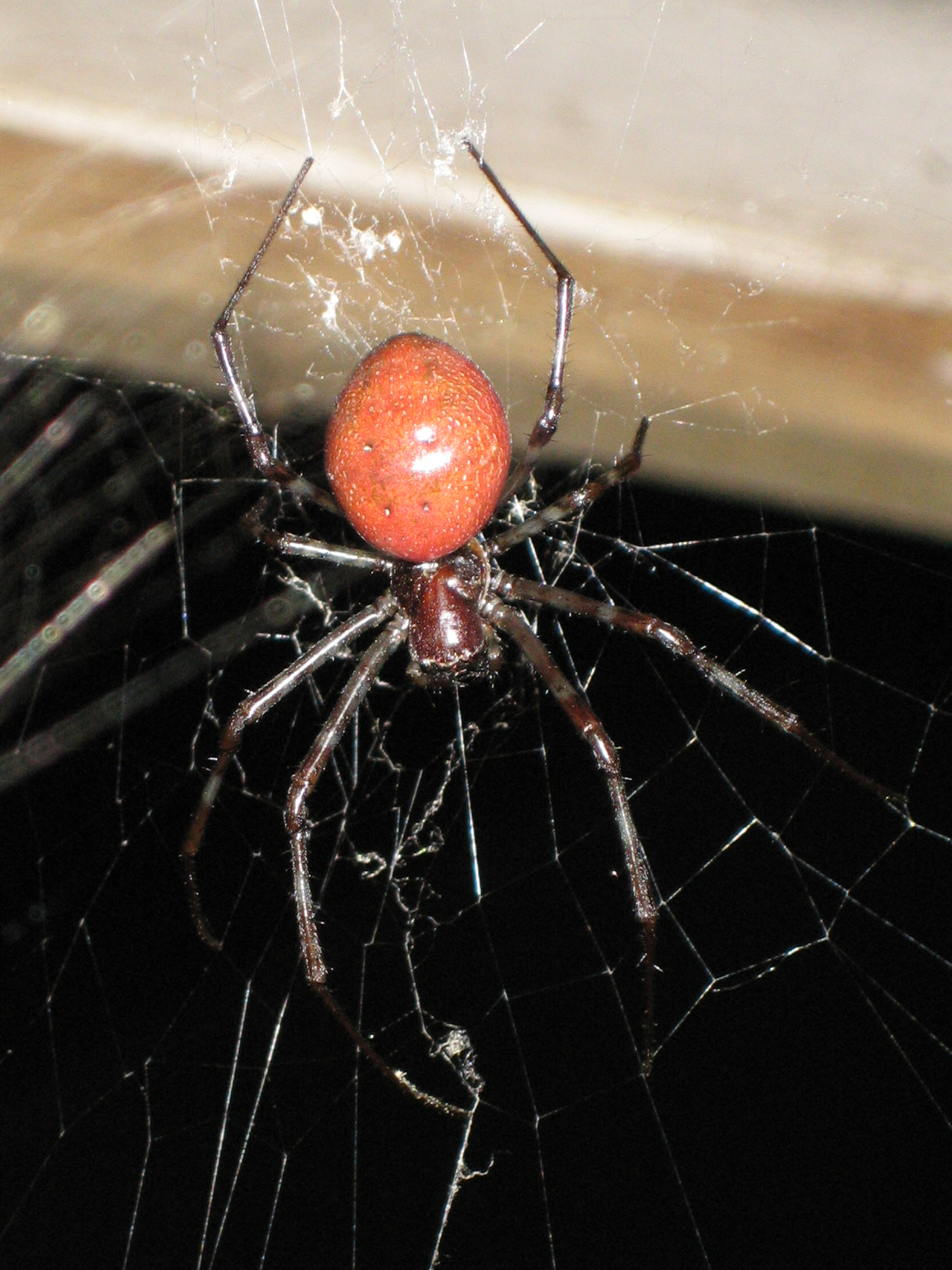
- female N. borbonica from La Réunion

Scientific classification
- Kingdom: Animalia
- Phylum: Arthropoda
- Subphylum: Chelicerata
- Class: Arachnida
- Order: Araneae
- Infraorder: Araneomorphae
- Family: Nephilidae
- Genus: Nephilingis
- Species: N. borbonica

Binomial name
- Nephilingis borbonica (Vinson, 1863)

Synonyms
- Epeira borbonica Nephila instigans Nephila cruentata borbonica

= Nephilingis borbonica =

Species of spider

Nephilingis borbonica is an nephilid spider from Réunion. It was once thought to also inhabit Madagascar and other nearby islands, however these were determined in 2011 to be a different species, Nephilingis livida, while specimens from Mauritius were placed in the new species Nephilingis dodo.

== Anatomy ==
=== Female ===
The color of the abdomen ranges from striking bright red to whitish-red, with larger specimens displaying a brighter red. Total length ranges from about 14 to 22mm.

=== Male ===
Males' total length ranges from about 4 to 6 mm. They have a yellow-brown prosoma, and a gray abdomen with white pigment dots.

== Distribution ==
N. borbonica occurs in Réunion, and were observed in cloud forests at up to 1,500 m elevation .

== Name ==
The species name borbonica refers to the island Réunion near Madagascar, which was called "Bourbon" until 1848.
