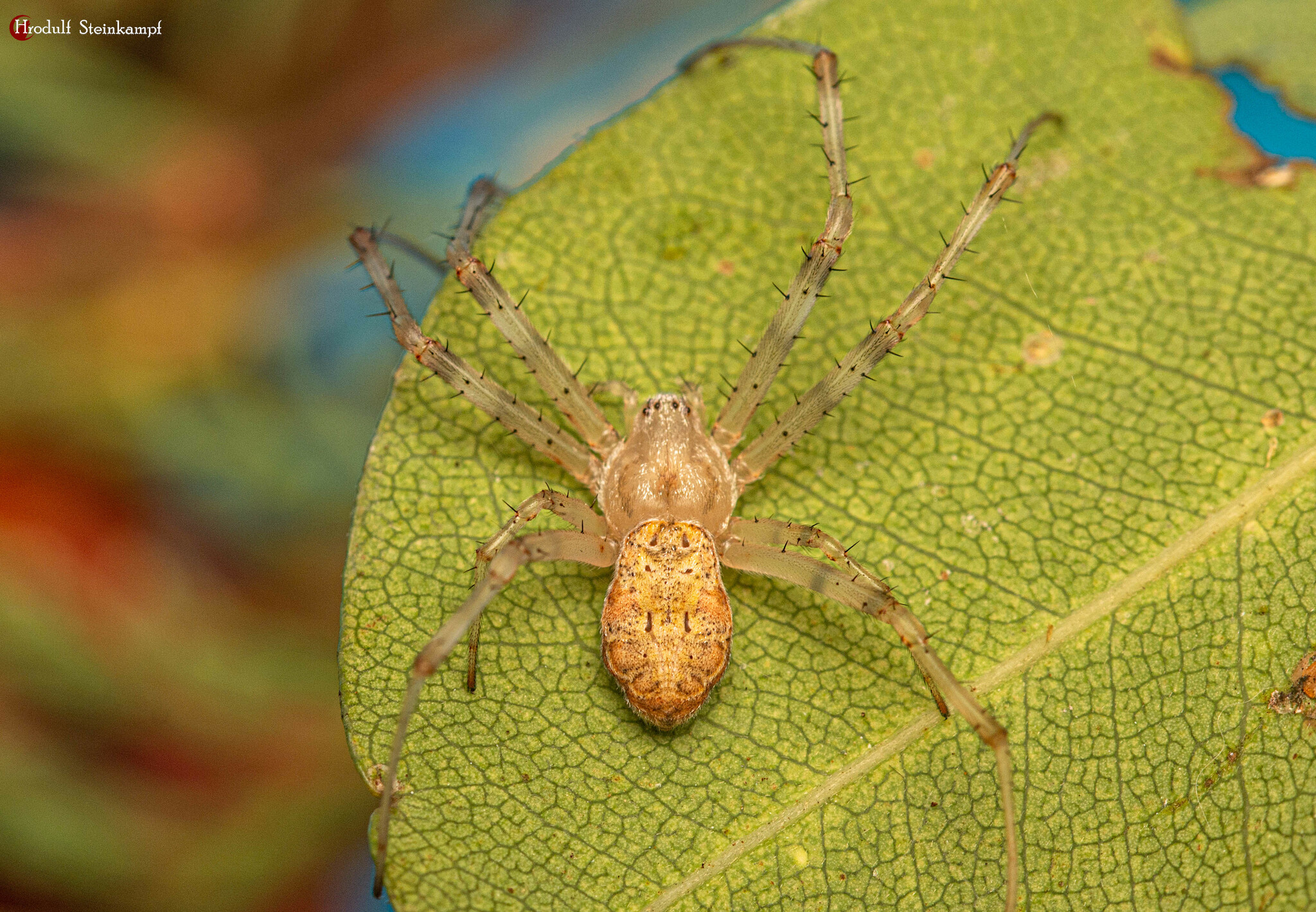
- juvenile
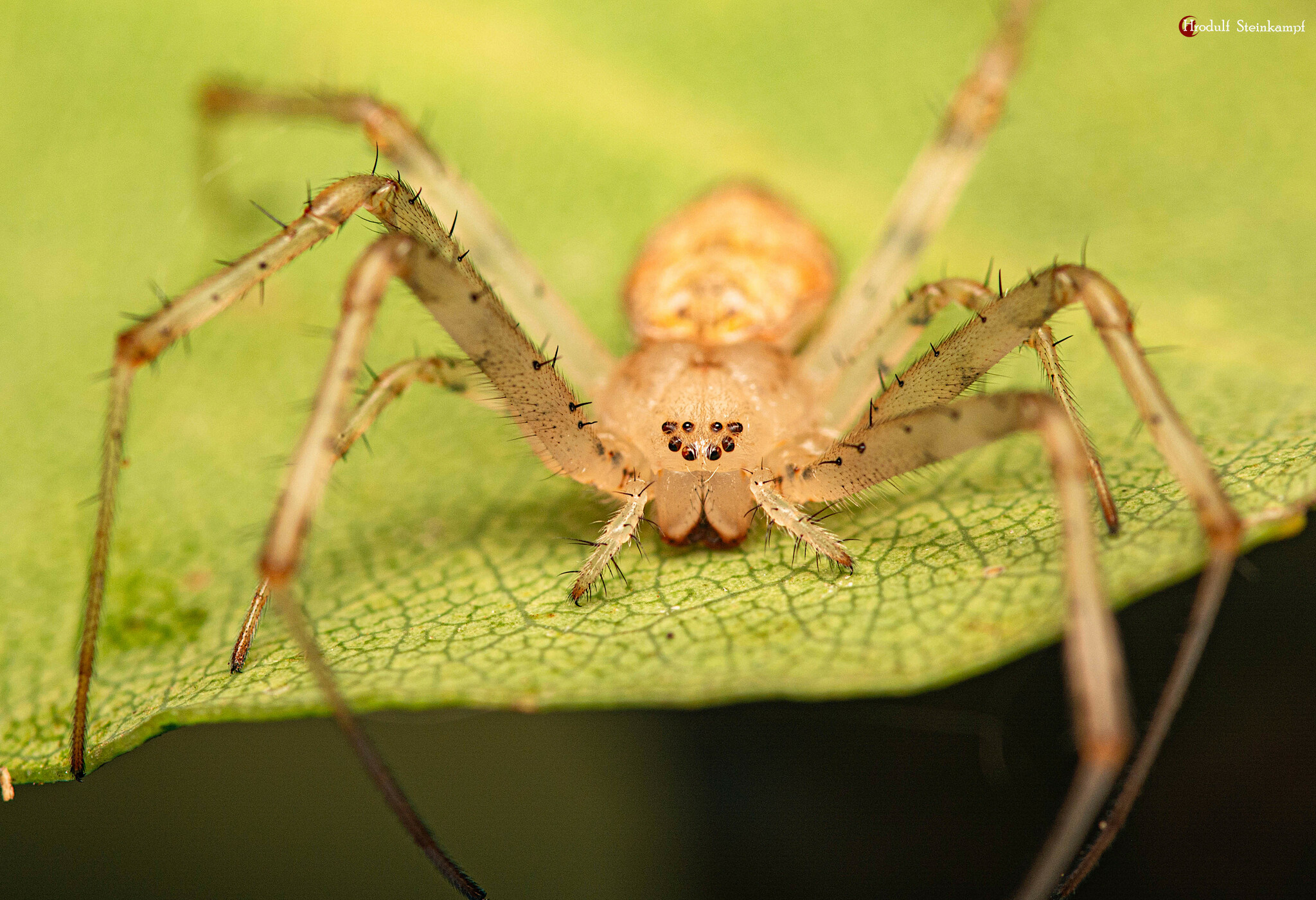
- juvenile

Scientific classification
- Kingdom: Animalia
- Phylum: Arthropoda
- Subphylum: Chelicerata
- Class: Arachnida
- Order: Araneae
- Infraorder: Araneomorphae
- Family: Nephilidae
- Genus: Clitaetra
- Species: C. irenae

Binomial name
- Clitaetra irenae Kuntner, 2006

= Clitaetra irenae =

Irene's Tree Orb-web Spider

Species of spider

Clitaetra irenae is a species of spider in the family Araneidae. It is endemic to Malawi and South Africa and is commonly known as Irene's tree orb-web spider.

== Distribution ==
Clitaetra irenae is known from Malawi and South Africa. In South Africa, it is recorded only from KwaZulu-Natal, where it occurs in the iSimangaliso Wetland Park, Ndumo Game Reserve, Phinda Game Reserve, and Tembe Elephant Park.

== Habitat and ecology ==
The species inhabits sand forests, riparian forests, floodplain forests and closed-canopy woodlands of the coastal plain of northern KwaZulu-Natal at altitudes ranging from 3 to 91 metres above sea level.

The spiders build elongated orb webs over tree trunks, rock outcrops, or wooden walls. The webs are described as ladder-webs, built more or less vertically with parallel vertical sides and parallel 'spirals'. They are typically constructed within tree trunk depressions or concave sections where the clearance between the web and the tree is greatest at the hub, typically 2–4 cm in female webs.

The hub of the orb web is reinforced with fine silk mesh. The spider rests at the hub, typically with prey remains suspended above the hub. The webs of adult females are eccentric, with the lower portion being larger than the upper. They build webs at night and in the early morning hours, sometimes only partially renewing the old web by retaining and reinforcing the hub and an orb sector.

== Description ==
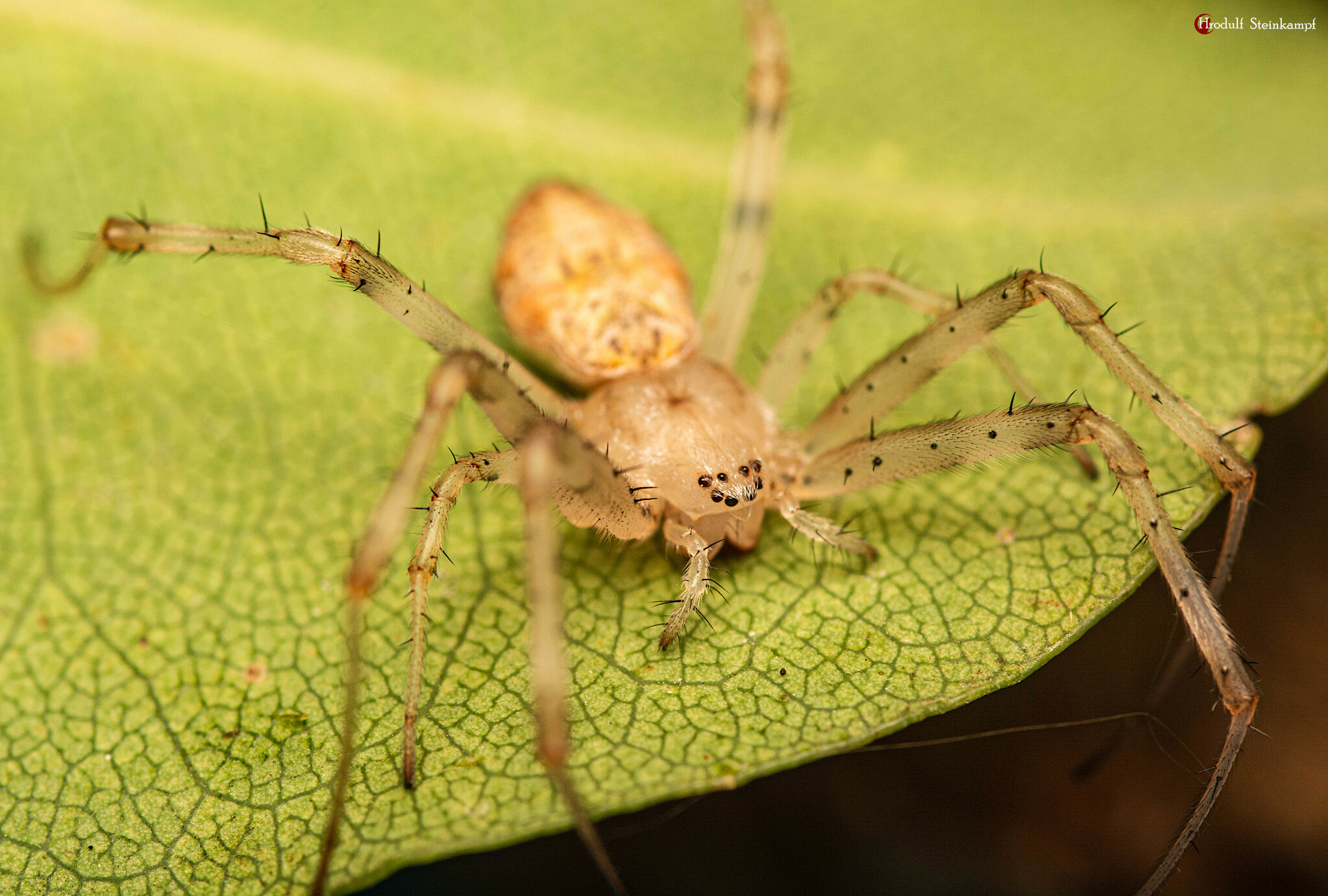
juvenile

== Conservation ==
Clitaetra irenae is listed as Least Concern by the South African National Biodiversity Institute due to its relatively wide geographical range. The species is protected in Ndumo Game Reserve, Phinda Game Reserve, and Tembe Elephant Park.

== Taxonomy ==
The species was originally described by Matjaž Kuntner in 2006 from iSimangaliso Wetland Park.
