= Indoetra =

Scientific classification
- Kingdom: Animalia
- Phylum: Arthropoda
- Subphylum: Chelicerata
- Class: Arachnida
- Order: Araneae
- Infraorder: Araneomorphae
- Family: Nephilidae
- Genus: Indoetra; Kuntner, 2006
- Species: I. thisbe

Binomial name
- Indoetra thisbe (Simon, 1903)

Genus of spiders

Indoetra is a monotypic genus of south Asian golden orb-weaver spiders containing the single species, Indoetra thisbe. Originally described as a subgenus of Clitaetra, it was elevated to genus status in 2019. It has only been found in Sri Lanka.
