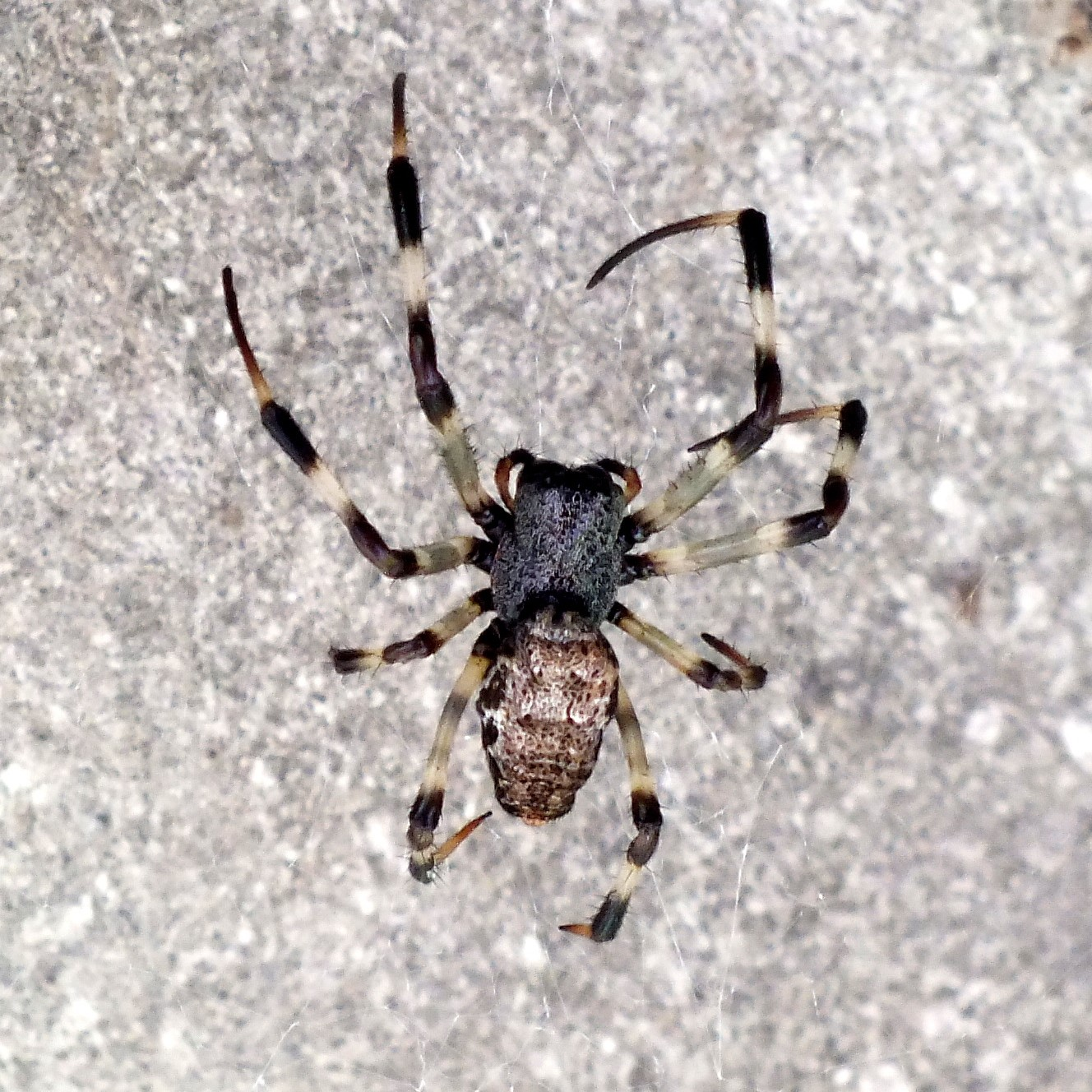
- Nephilengys malabarensis

Scientific classification
- Kingdom: Animalia
- Phylum: Arthropoda
- Subphylum: Chelicerata
- Class: Arachnida
- Order: Araneae
- Infraorder: Araneomorphae
- Family: Nephilidae
- Genus: Nephilengys; L. Koch, 1872

Type species
- Epeira malabarensis Walckenaer, 1841

Species
- See text

Diversity
- 2 species

= Nephilengys =

Genus of spiders

Nephilengys is a genus of tropical spiders of the family Nephilidae, consisting of two currently described species. (The genus was formerly placed in the Araneidae and Tetragnathidae.) The genus Nephilingis has been split off from this genus. Both genera have been called hermit spiders from the habit staying in their retreats during the day; the name eunuch spiders has been used for Nephilengys alone. Males may sever parts of their palpal bulbs after copulation.

== Description ==
Females are from 10 mm to 28 mm long, with males typically only reaching about 5mm. The prosoma has a wide and high head region. The carapace features strong erect spines. The edges of the carapace are lined with a row of long white hairs. Males are 3–6 mm long.

=== Habits ===
Nephilengys is the most synanthropic (found in and around human dwellings) of the nephiline genera. They build their webs against substrates such as tree trunks or walls. These can have a diameter of up to one meter. Nephilengys species incorporate a tubular retreat into their webs into which they will escape when disturbed. The retreat is always built against a hard surface; the web is built against a substrate, like those of Herennia and Clitaetra. While the orbs of young spiders are roughly symmetric, adults place the web hub very close to the top frame. While most orb web spiders rebuild a damaged web completely Nephilengys repairs damaged parts.

Nephilengys are nocturnal spiders, spending most of the day in their retreat and nights at the hub.

=== Reproduction ===
The females are much larger than males, for example in N. malabariensis 20 mm versus 4 mm. Adult males do not build their own webs, but live with females, with sometimes several males found in the web of an adult or immature female. They accordingly lack silk glands producing sticky silk. Males often mate with a freshly moulted female, which cannot resist due to the softness of its cuticula. They often sever their mating organs, which are then found stuck in the female genital opening. Severed males may live on in their mate's web.

== Taxonomy ==
The genus was erected in 1872 by Ludwig Koch. He placed four species in the genus, including the species then known as Epeira malabarensis, first described by Walckenaer in 1842. Koch described Nephilengys as very similar in the form of the cephalothorax, maxillae and labium to Nephila, but differing in the position of the eyes, and in leg lengths. The name Nephilengys refers to the close relationship with Nephila: Nephilengys = Nephila + Ancient Greek -engy-, "near to" or "close to".

Koch placed Nephilengys in the family Araneidae. In 1894, Eugène Simon erected the subfamily Nephilinae within the Araneidae for Nephila and related genera, including Nephilengys. This classification was used until the late 20th century, when cladistic studies initially suggested that nephilines belonged in the Tetragnathidae, although this was later refuted. In 2006, Matjaž Kuntner removed the nephilines from Araneidae and raised them to the family Nephilidae. Molecular phylogenetic studies from 2004 onwards consistently placed nephilids within Araneidae. Accordingly in 2016, Dimitar Dimitrov et al. returned the group to their traditional position as a subfamily of Araneidae.

In 2013, based on phylogenetic studies, Matjaž Kuntner and co-workers split the original genus Nephilengys into two genera. Two species were left in Nephilengys, the remaining four being moved to the new genus Nephilingis. Nephilengys is differentiated from Nephilingis by the shapes of the female epigynum and the male palpal bulb.

=== Species ===
As of November 2026, the World Spider Catalog accepted the following species:

- Nephilengys malabarensis (Walckenaer, 1842) – India to China, Philippines, Japan, Ambon
- Nephilengys papuana Thorell, 1881 – New Guinea, Queensland

== Distribution ==
Nephilengys species occur in tropical Asia, from India to Indonesia, and in Queensland, Australia.

== Predators and parasites ==
N. malabarensis are preyed upon by the spider-eating jumping spider Portia. At least some species shake their bodies vigorously when touched.
