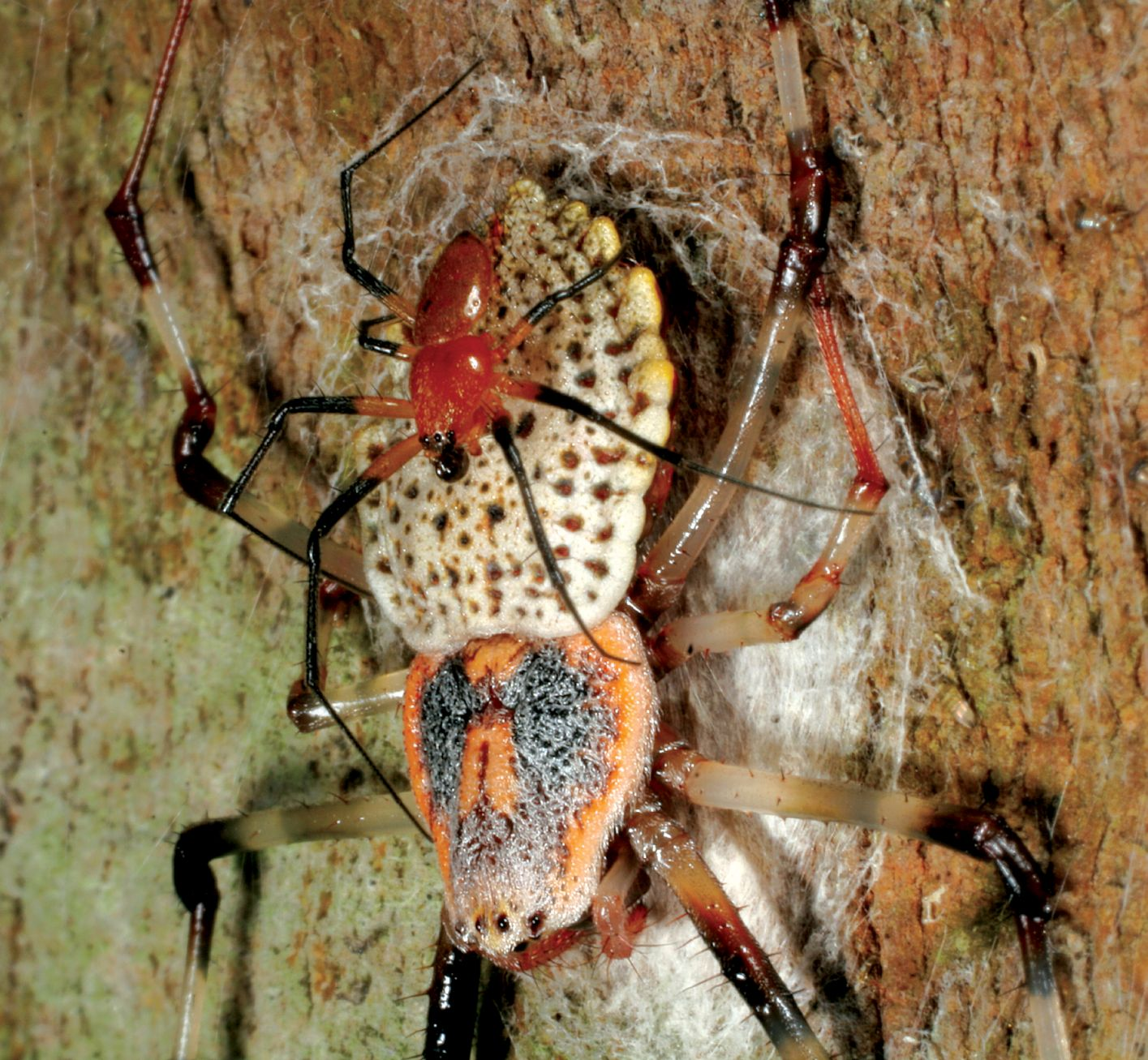
- Male spider (red) on female's back

Conservation status
- Least Concern (IUCN 3.1)

Scientific classification
- Kingdom: Animalia
- Phylum: Arthropoda
- Subphylum: Chelicerata
- Class: Arachnida
- Order: Araneae
- Infraorder: Araneomorphae
- Family: Nephilidae
- Genus: Herennia
- Species: H. multipuncta

Binomial name
- Herennia multipuncta (Doleschall, 1859)

Synonyms
- Epeira ornatissima Doleschall, 1859; H. sampitana Karsch; H. mollis Thorell

= Herennia multipuncta =

Species of spider

Herennia multipuncta, commonly known as the spotted coin spider, is a species of spider in the family Nephilidae native to Asia. It exhibits sexual dimorphism, the female being much larger than the male. It weaves a small web on the trunk of a tree or the wall of a building and is well camouflaged by its dappled colouration.

== Description ==
The female has a hairy cephalothorax that is narrow in front and longer than it is wide. It is reddish-brown with a yellowish, U-shaped patch near the front and darker markings further back. The mouthparts are yellowish-brown and the long, slender, hairy and spiny legs are mostly brown. The abdomen has a flattened, pale grey dorsal surface with five pairs of sigilla (puncture-like spots where muscles are attached internally), numerous grey specks and a few dark streaks near the back. The male is reddish-brown with dark legs. His body length at 5 to 7 mm (0.2 to 0.3 in) is about half that of the female at 10 to 14 mm (0.4 to 0.6 in). This spider rests head-downwards on the web with its legs flexed. Its colouring makes it well camouflaged.

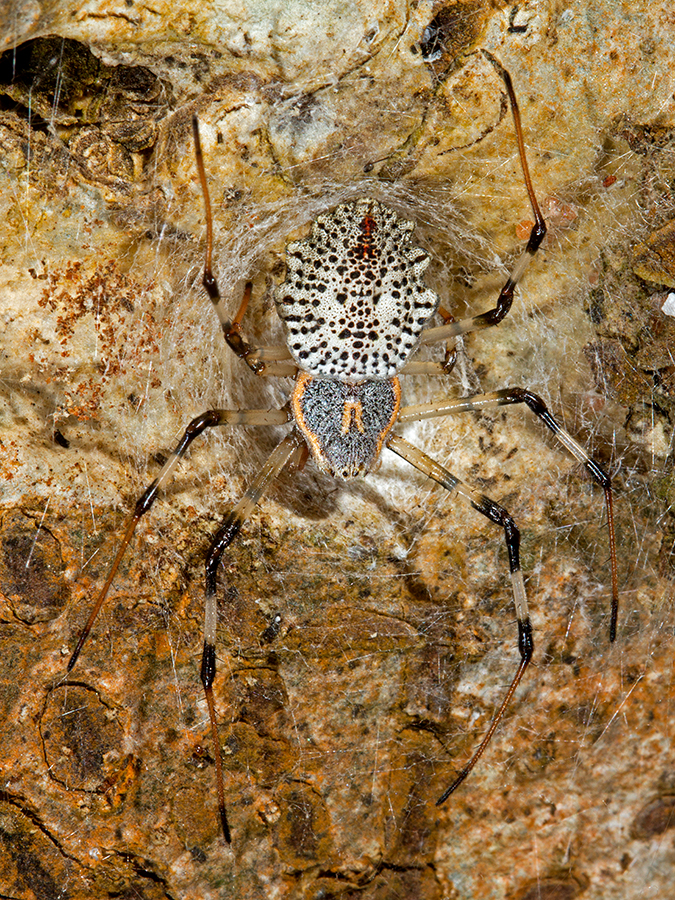
Characteristic yellowish, U-shaped patch near the front clearly visible

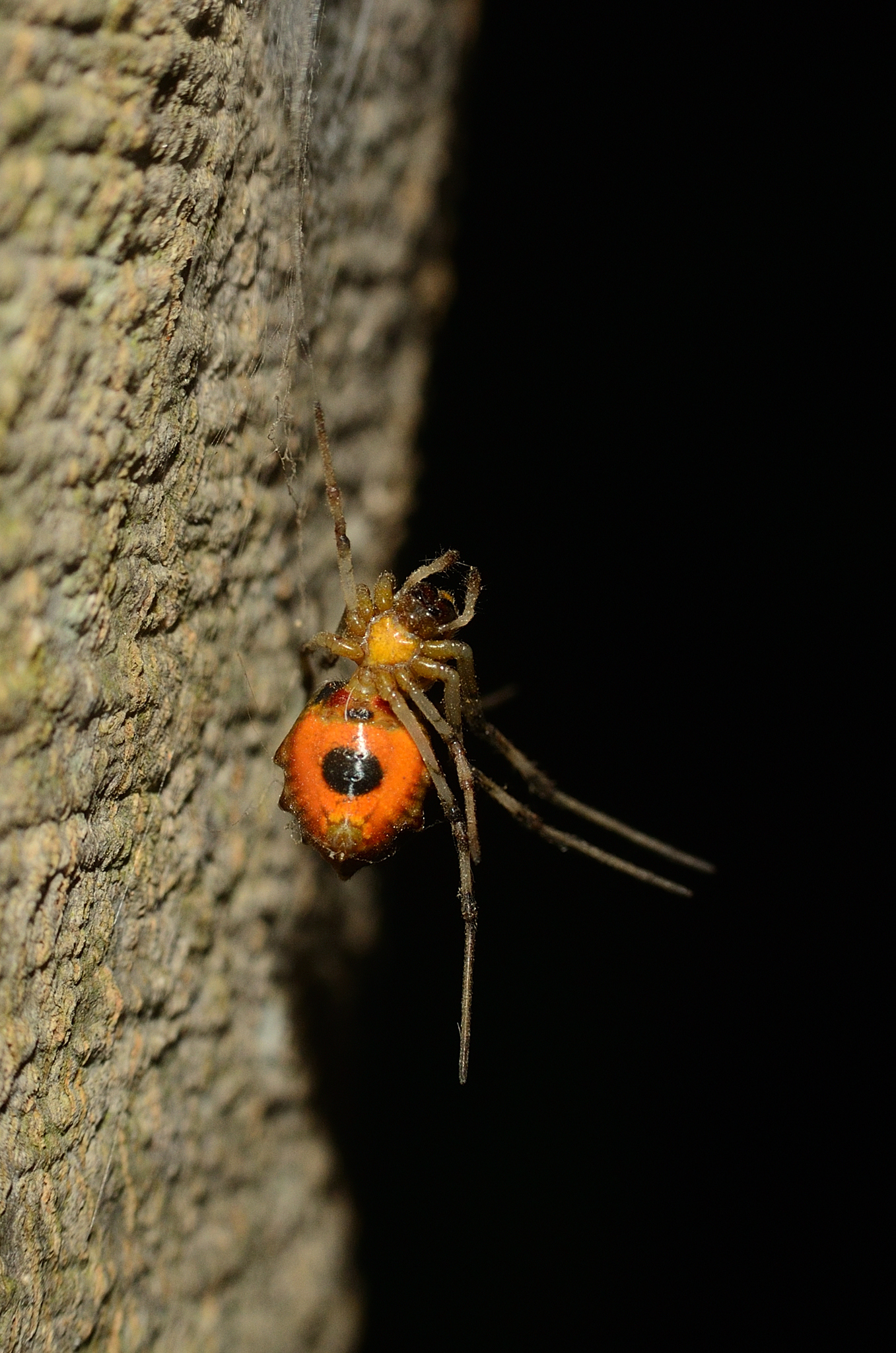
Ventral side

== Distribution and habitat ==
H. multipuncta is found in tropical parts of southern Asia where its range includes India, Malaysia, China and New Guinea. It is often found in association with man and has spread to other countries where it is considered invasive. Its habitat is the trunks of trees and the walls of buildings where it creates a small web close to the surface. The web starts off as an orb web using prominences on the underlying structure for support. As the spider grows, so does the web and allometrically becomes a substrate-dependent ladder web with parallel-sided rather than rounded side frames. The hub of the web is modified into a silken cup. This species is said to be invasive and synanthropic.

== Behaviour ==
Like other spiders, the male of this species uses his pedipalps to insert sperm into the female's seminal receptacles. The terminal joint of the palps become detached and remains in the female during seventy-five to eighty percent of matings, especially when the female is aggressive. It is surmised that the severed copulatory organs may function as plugs to prevent leakage of sperm and that abandoning them may be a sensible option for the male as otherwise his damaged palps might leak haemolymph. Although their loss effectively makes the male sterile, he usually stays with the female and fends off rival males, and this behaviour protects his reproductive investment. A subsequent study suggests that losing the extra weight of the pedipalps allows males to more effectively fend off rival males, guard their mate and thereby ensure paternity.
