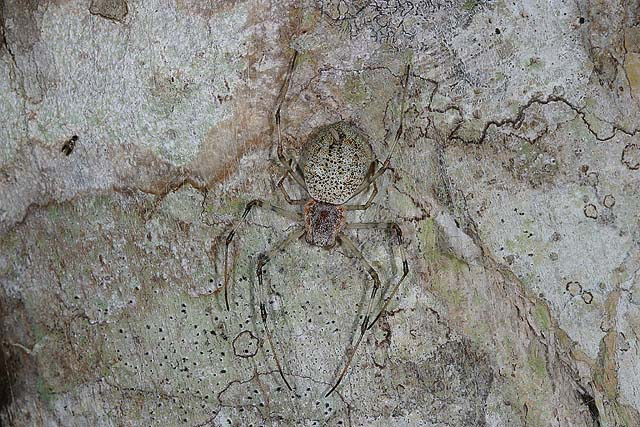
- H. cf. papuana, from New Guinea

Scientific classification
- Kingdom: Animalia
- Phylum: Arthropoda
- Subphylum: Chelicerata
- Class: Arachnida
- Order: Araneae
- Infraorder: Araneomorphae
- Family: Nephilidae
- Genus: Herennia; Thorell, 1877

Species
- See text

Diversity
- 14 species

= Herennia =

Genus of spiders

Herennia is a genus of spiders in the family Nephilidae, found from India to northern Australia. While two species have been known since the 19th century, nine new species were described in 2005. Spiders in this genus are sometimes called coin spiders.

While H. multipuncta is invasive and synanthropic, all other known species are endemic to islands.

Like in the related genus Nephilengys, the much smaller males mutilate and sever their pedipalps, which are often found stuck in the epigynum or female genital openings. It is suggested that they act as mating plugs to prevent other males from mating with the female and thereby ensure the paternity of offspring. The males cannot mate subsequently and such "eunuch" individuals continue to stay near the female.

== Name ==
Herennia Etruscilla was the wife of Trajan Decius. There are coins bearing her image, which were probably the source for Thorell to name the genus. The non-scientific name coin spiders was proposed because of this fact.

== Species ==
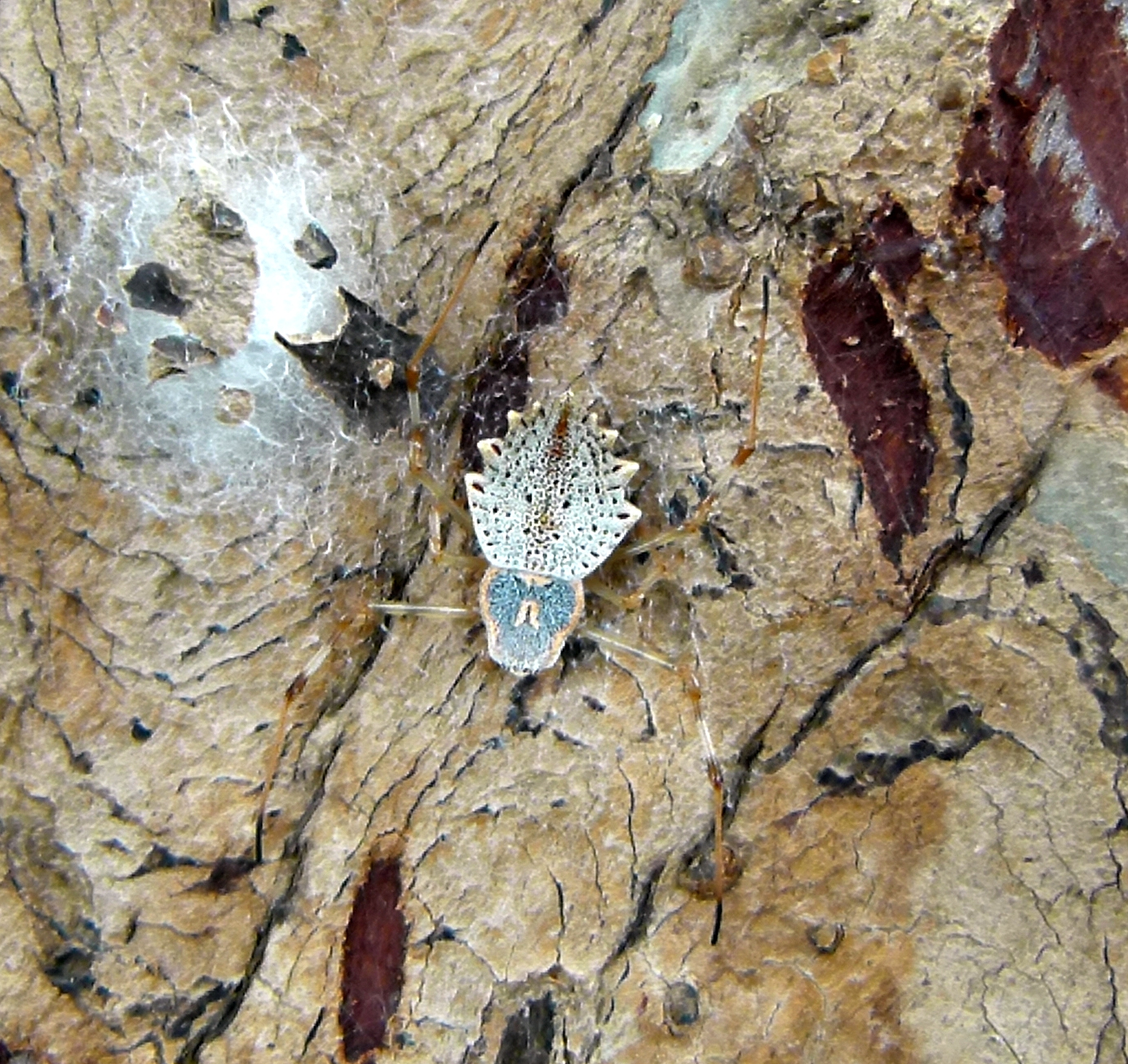
H. multipuncta

As of November 2026, the World Spider Catalog accepted the following species:

- Herennia agnarssoni Kuntner, 2005 — Solomon Islands
- Herennia deelemanae Kuntner, 2005 — Borneo
- Herennia etruscilla Kuntner, 2005 — Java
- Herennia eva Kuntner, 2026 — Sulawesi
- Herennia gagamba Kuntner, 2005 — Philippines
- Herennia jernej Kuntner, 2005 — Sumatra
- Herennia maj Kuntner, 2026 — Vietnam
- Herennia milleri Kuntner, 2005 — New Guinea, New Britain
- Herennia multipuncta (Doleschall, 1859) — India to Taiwan, South East Asia, Borneo, Sulawesi, Sumatra, Java
- Herennia oz Kuntner, 2005 — Northern Territory
- Herennia papuana Thorell, 1881 — New Guinea
- Herennia sonja Kuntner, 2005 — Kalimantan, Sulawesi
- Herennia tone Kuntner, 2005 — Philippines
- Herennia tsoi Kuntner, Yu, Turk, Čandek, Gregorič, Anderson, Coddington & Cheng, 2026 — Taiwan
