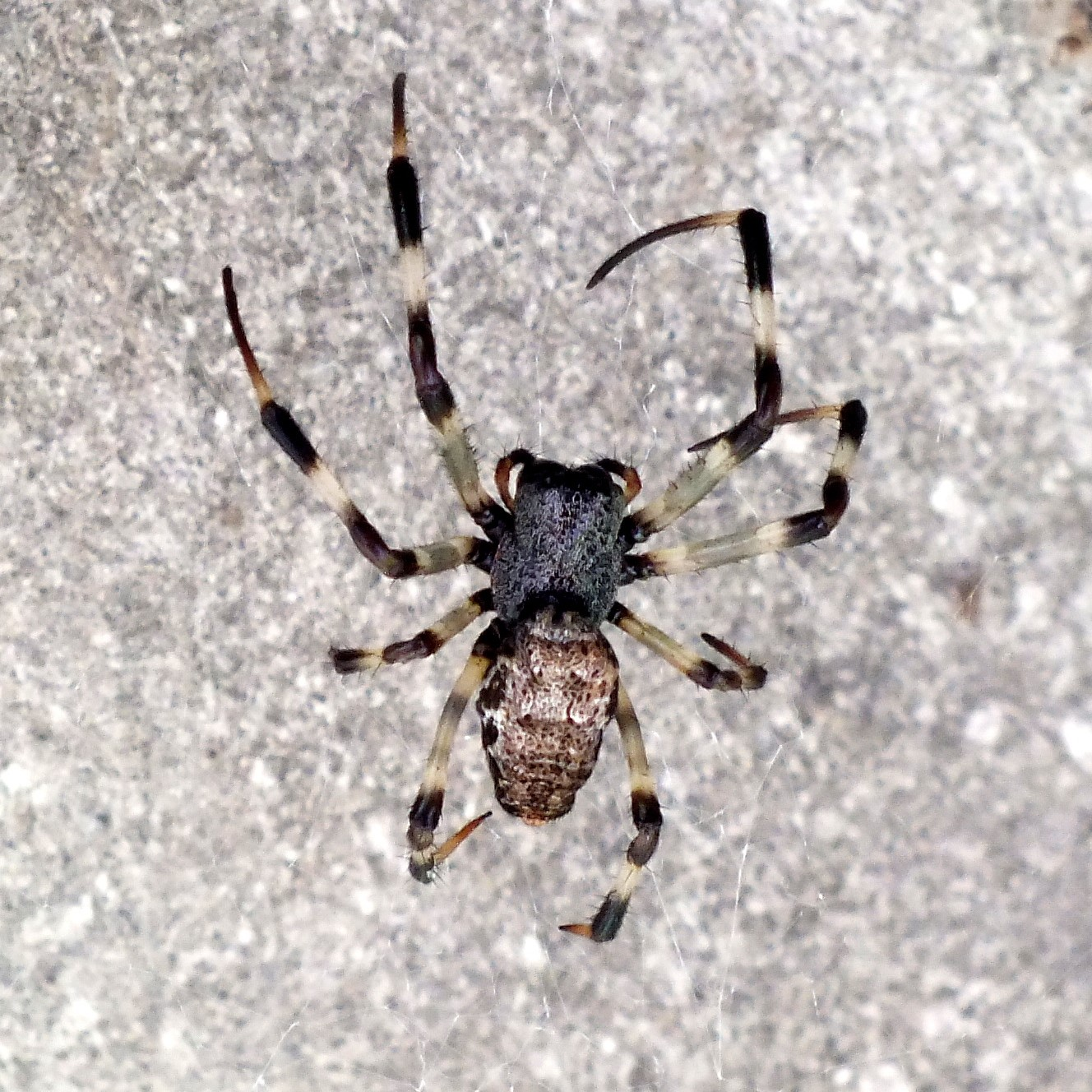

Scientific classification
- Kingdom: Animalia
- Phylum: Arthropoda
- Subphylum: Chelicerata
- Class: Arachnida
- Order: Araneae
- Infraorder: Araneomorphae
- Family: Nephilidae
- Genus: Nephilengys
- Species: N. malabarensis

Binomial name
- Nephilengys malabarensis (Walckenaer, 1842)
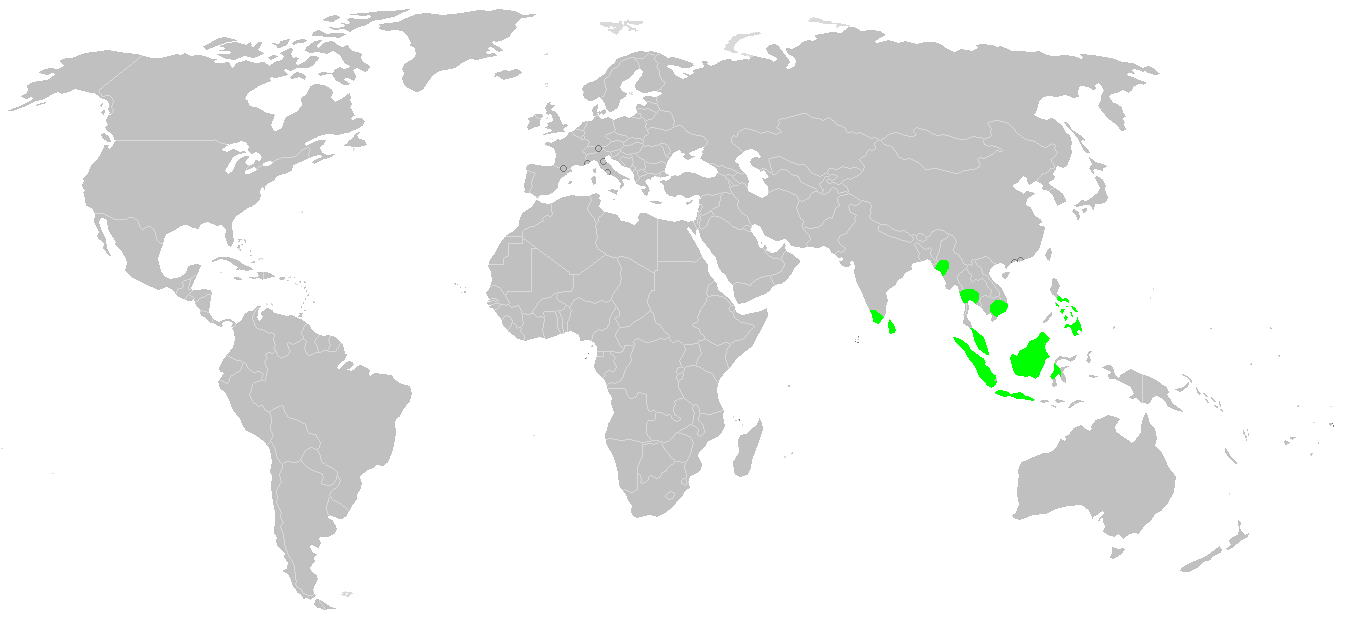

Synonyms
- Epeira malabarensis Walckenaer, 1841; Epeira anama Walckenaer, 1841; Epeira malabarica Doleschall, 1857; Epeira rhodosternon Doleschall, 1859; Nephila rivulata O. Pickard-Cambridge, 1871; Nephilengys schmeltzii L. Koch, 1872; Nephilengys hofmanni L. Koch, 1872; Nephila urna Hasselt, 1882; Nephila malabarensis (Walckenaer, 1841); Metepeira andamanensis Tikader, 1977; Nephilengys niahensis Deeleman-Reinhold, 1989

= Nephilengys malabarensis =

Species of spider

Nephilengys malabarensis is an nephilid spider.

Females reach a body length of almost 19 millimetres (0.75 in). The legs and palp are annulated yellow and black. Male body size less than 5 millimetres (0.20 in), with mostly grey-black legs.

N. malabarensis is being preyed upon by the spider-eating jumping spider Portia.

== Name ==
The species name malabarensis refers to the Malabar coast of southern India, where it was first found.

== Description ==
N. malabarensis is a relatively large orb-weaver spider with distinct sexual size dimorphism. Females are considerably larger than males, with a total length ranging from 10.4 to 18.6 mm, while males measure only 5.0 to 5.9 mm in total length.

According to the original description by Walckenaer (1841), the female has a body length of approximately 10 lines (about 23mm). The cephalothorax is short, black, wide and convex at the anterior part, with a smooth sternum that is pale yellow and uniformly bordered near the legs by a brown line. The anterior eyes of the median row are closer together and larger than the posterior ones, with the lateral eyes widely spaced but positioned on the same prominence of the cephalothorax.

Modern descriptions show considerable color variation in this species. In females, the prosoma is typically dark red-brown, while the sternum is characteristically orange in living specimens (appearing white in preserved alcohol specimens), often with broad lateral brown bands. The abdomen shows variable coloration from white through various shades of grey to black, with the dorsum typically white with brown dots. The venter is brown with two large pairs of irregularly shaped orange patches in live specimens (white in preserved material), along with smaller orange dots between the epigynum and pedicel.

Males are much smaller and differently colored, with an orange prosoma and grey-black legs, except for yellow coxae, trochanters, and proximal femora. The male's scutum is orange with a medial black stripe in live specimens.

The abdomen is brown on the dorsum with paler patches, and the venter is brown with oval or triangular spots of bright yellow. The anterior spots near the cephalothorax are triangular, while the posterior ones are finer and surround the anus. The sides have longitudinal yellow streaks. The legs are reddish with brown rings at the joints, described as fine and not very elongated.

== Distribution ==
N. malabarensis occurs in South, South-East and East Asia from India and Sri Lanka to the Philippines, north to Yunnan, China, north-east to Saga and Kompira, Japan and east to Ambon Island of Indonesia. It is common at human dwellings and less common in rainforest. The Niah population inhabits cave entrances.
