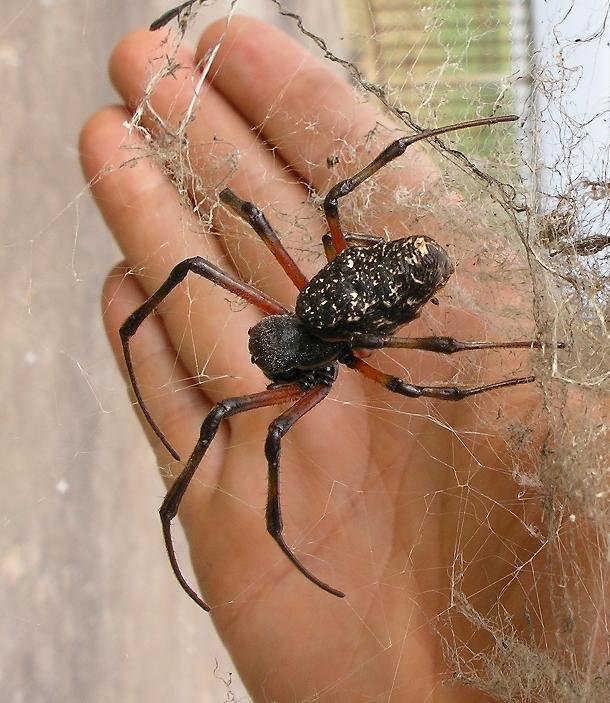
- Female Nephilingis cruentata in Mozambique
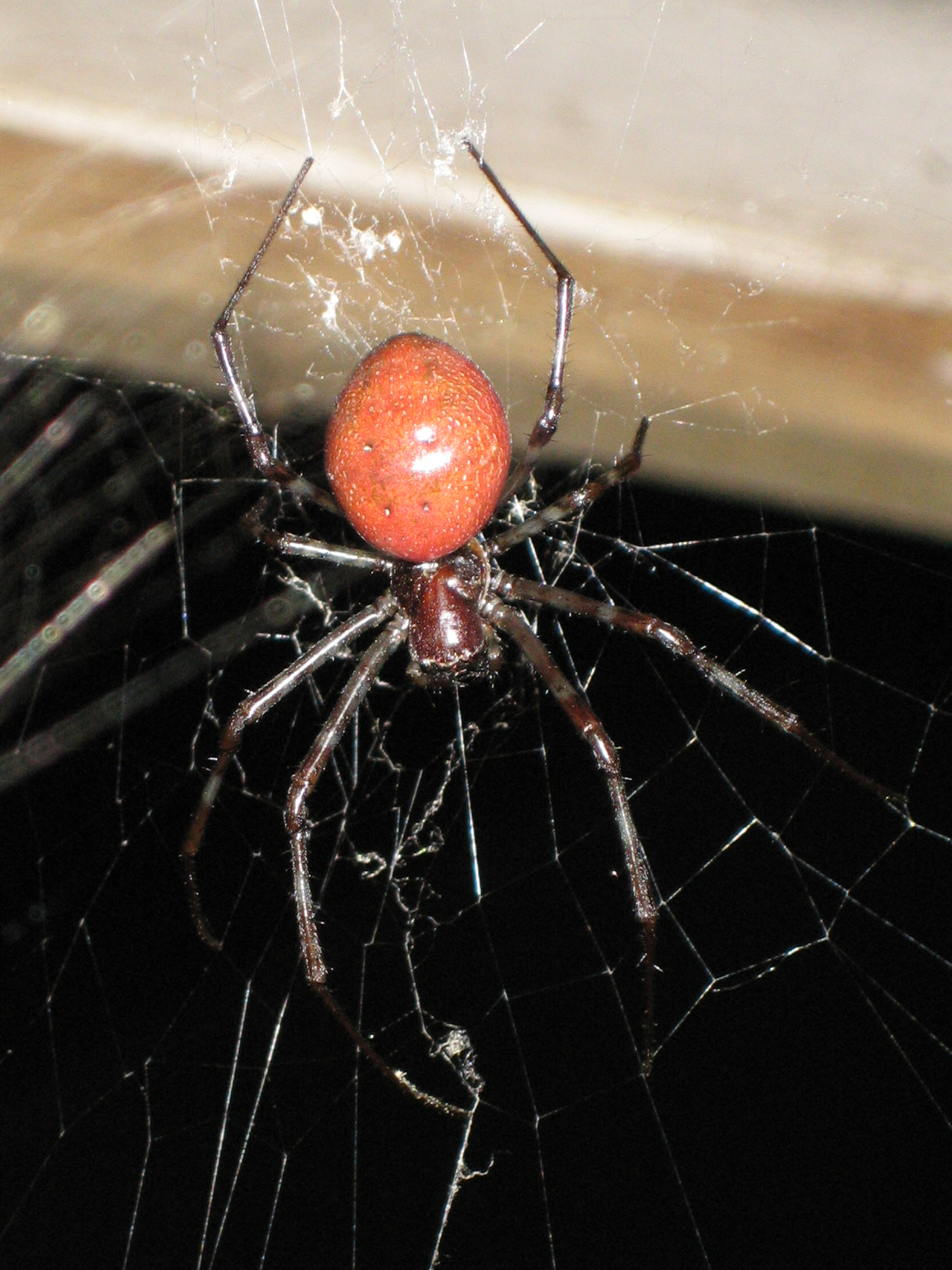
- Female N. borbonica

Scientific classification
- Kingdom: Animalia
- Phylum: Arthropoda
- Subphylum: Chelicerata
- Class: Arachnida
- Order: Araneae
- Infraorder: Araneomorphae
- Family: Nephilidae
- Genus: Nephilingis; Kuntner, 2013

Diversity
- 4 species

= Nephilingis =

Genus of spiders

Nephilingis is a genus of spiders in the subfamily Nephilidae. It was split off from the genus Nephilengys in 2006. Both genera have been called hermit spiders from the habit of staying in their retreats during the day; alternatively the name "hermit spider" may be reserved for Nephilingis, with Nephilengys species called "eunuch spiders".

== Distribution ==
Nephilingis is primarily a tropical African species, including islands off mainland Africa in the western Indian Ocean. The dispersal of Nephilingis cruentata to South America is believed to be relatively recent.

== Description ==
Females of species in the genus Nephilingis are large spiders, with a body length of 16–28 mm (0.63–1.10 in). The epigynum is wider than long, without a central septum or anterior rim – distinguishing them from females of Nephilengys.

Males are considerably smaller. The conductor of the palpal bulb is short, wide and spiraled. Species of Nephilingis, like those of Nephilengys, build large asymmetric webs on trees with a hiding retreat in which they hide during the day. The webs make use of branches and similar supports but are mainly aerial, contrasting with those of other nephiline species, whose webs follow the contours of the tree trunk.

== Species ==
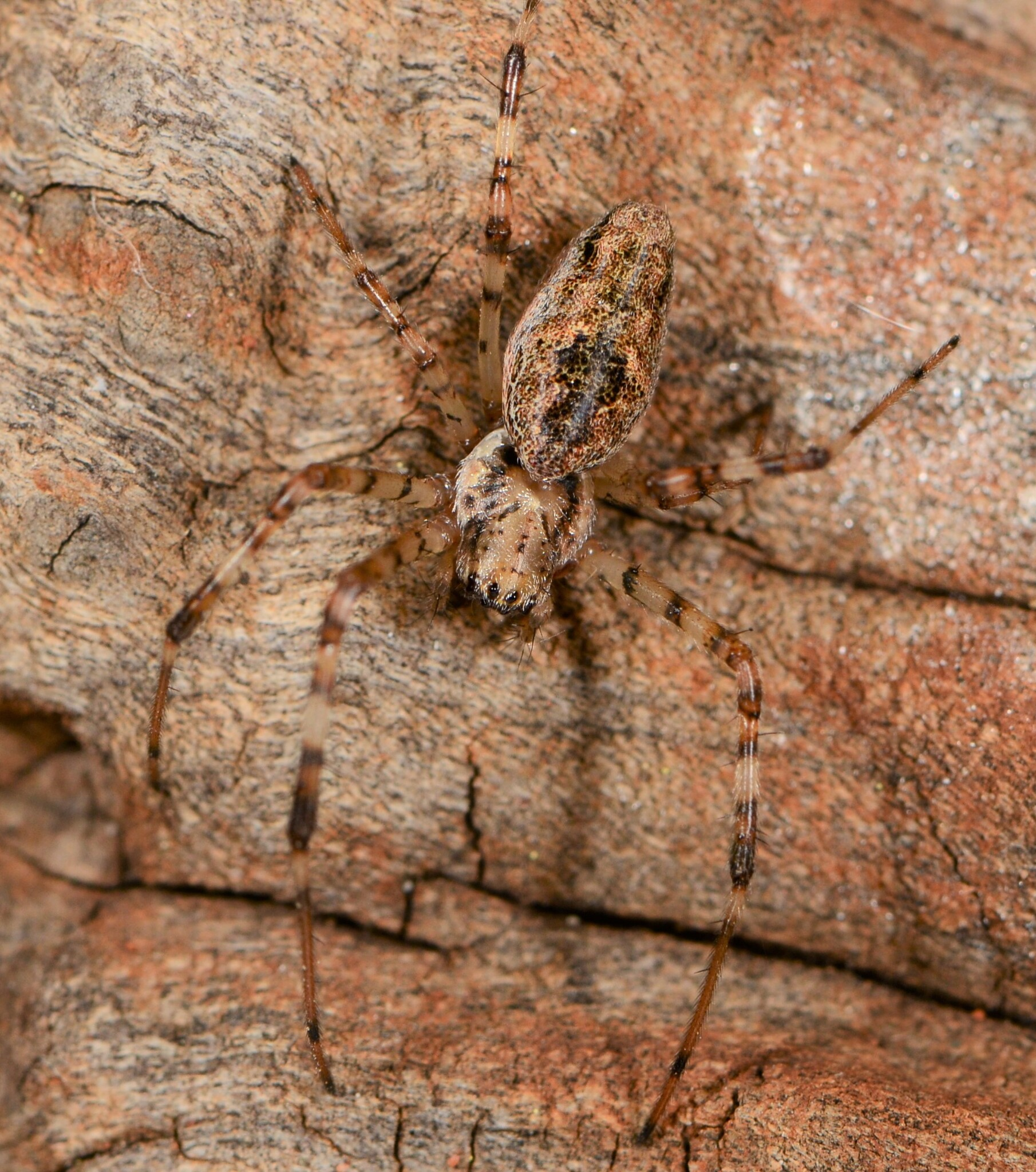
juvenile N. cruentata

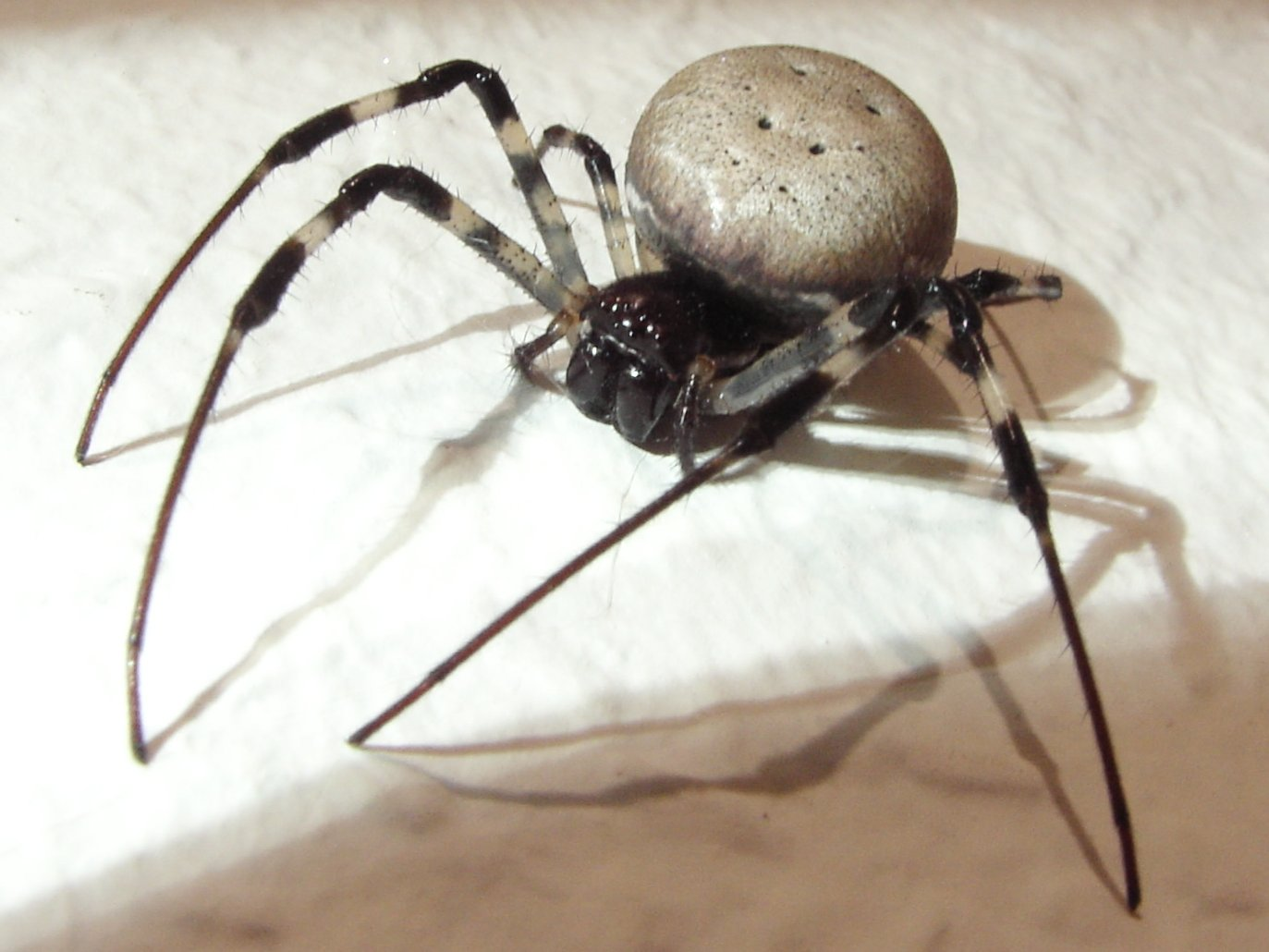
female N. livida

As of November 2026, this genus includes four species:

- Nephilingis borbonica (Vinson, 1863) – Réunion
- Nephilingis cruentata (Fabricius, 1775) – Tropical Africa. Introduced to Colombia, Brazil, Paraguay, Indian Ocean Islands (type species)
- Nephilingis dodo (Kuntner & Agnarsson, 2011) – Mauritius
- Nephilingis livida (Vinson, 1863) – Madagascar, Comoros, Mayotte, Seychelles

== Taxonomy ==
In 1872, Ludwig Koch created the genus Nephilengys. In 2013, based on phylogenetic studies, species:Matjaž Kuntner and co-workers split Nephilengys into two genera. Four species were moved to the newly erected genus Nephilingis, with two species being left in Nephilengys. Nephilingis is differentiated from Nephilengys by the shapes of the female epigynum and the male palpal bulb.

Koch placed the original genus Nephilengys in the family Araneidae. In 1894, Eugène Simon erected the subfamily Nephilinae within the Araneidae for Nephila and related genera, including Nephilengys. This classification was used until the late 20th century, when cladistic studies initially suggested that nephilines belonged in the Tetragnathidae, although this was later refuted. When Kuntner split Nephilengys in 2006, he raised the nephilines from a subfamily to the family Nephilidae. Molecular phylogenetic studies from 2004 onwards consistently placed nephilids within Araneidae. Accordingly in 2016, Dimitar Dimitrov et al. returned them to their traditional position as a subfamily of Araneidae.
