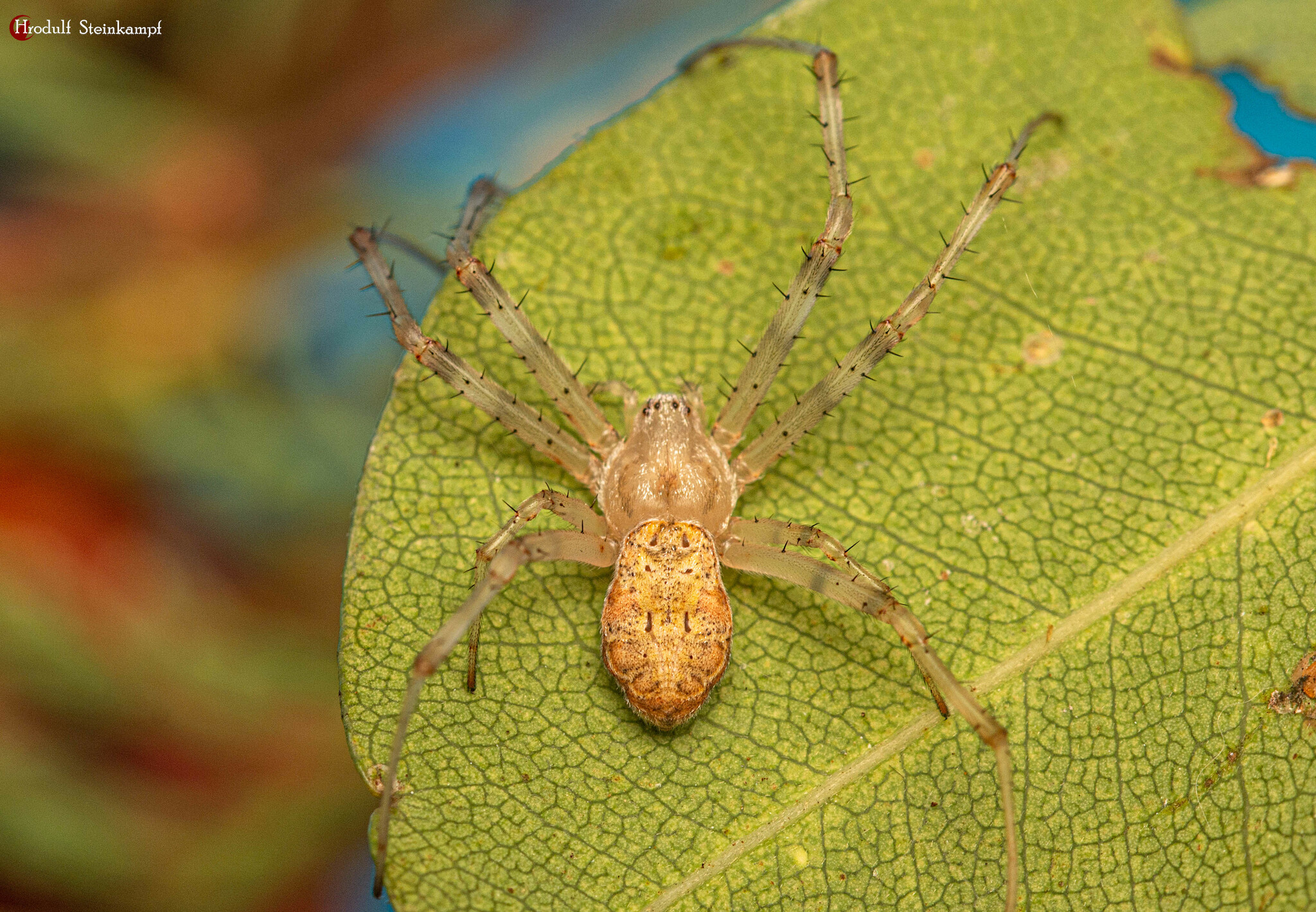
- juvenile
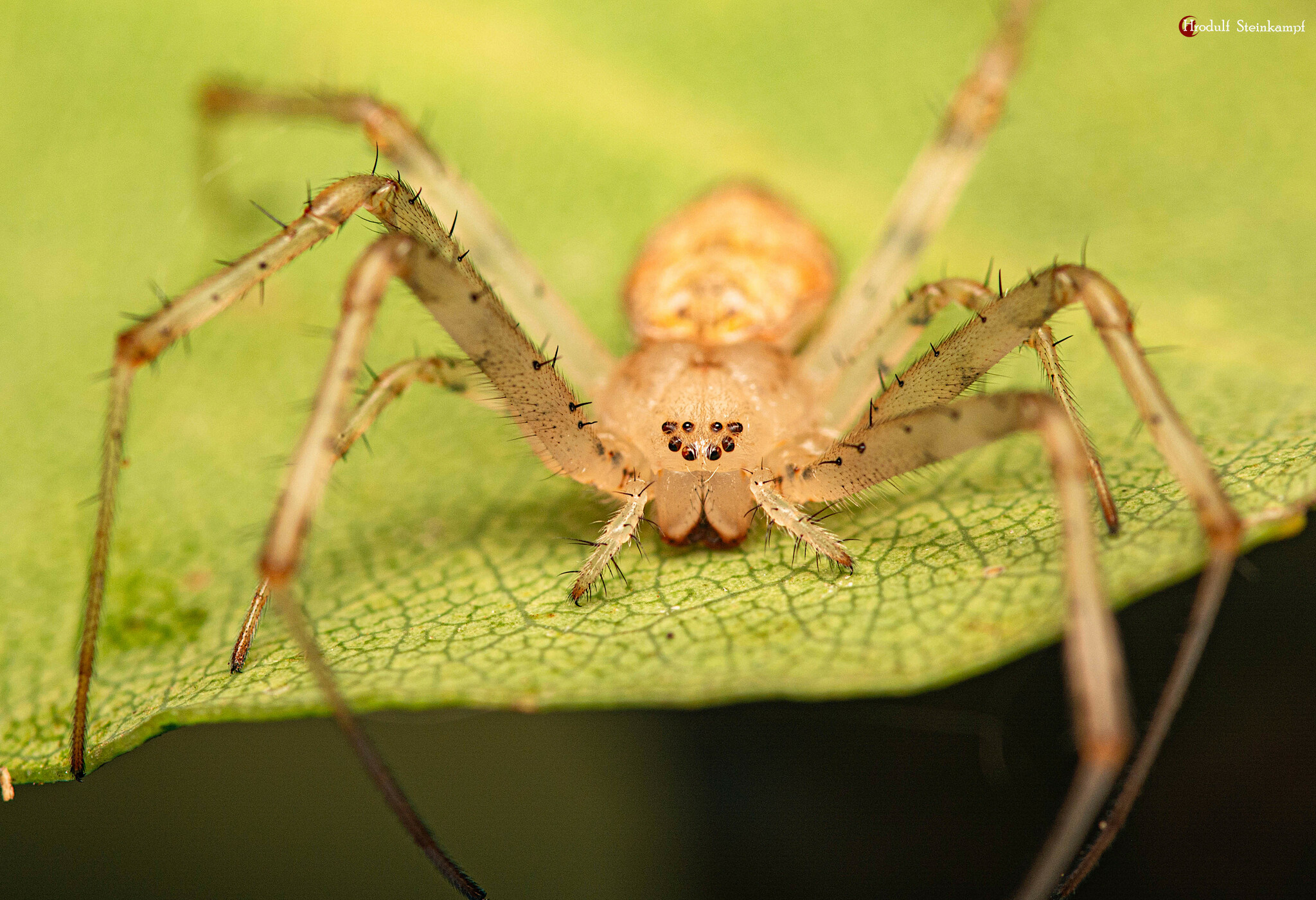
- juvenile

Scientific classification
- Kingdom: Animalia
- Phylum: Arthropoda
- Subphylum: Chelicerata
- Class: Arachnida
- Order: Araneae
- Infraorder: Araneomorphae
- Family: Nephilidae
- Genus: Clitaetra; Simon, 1889

Species
- See text

Diversity
- 6 species
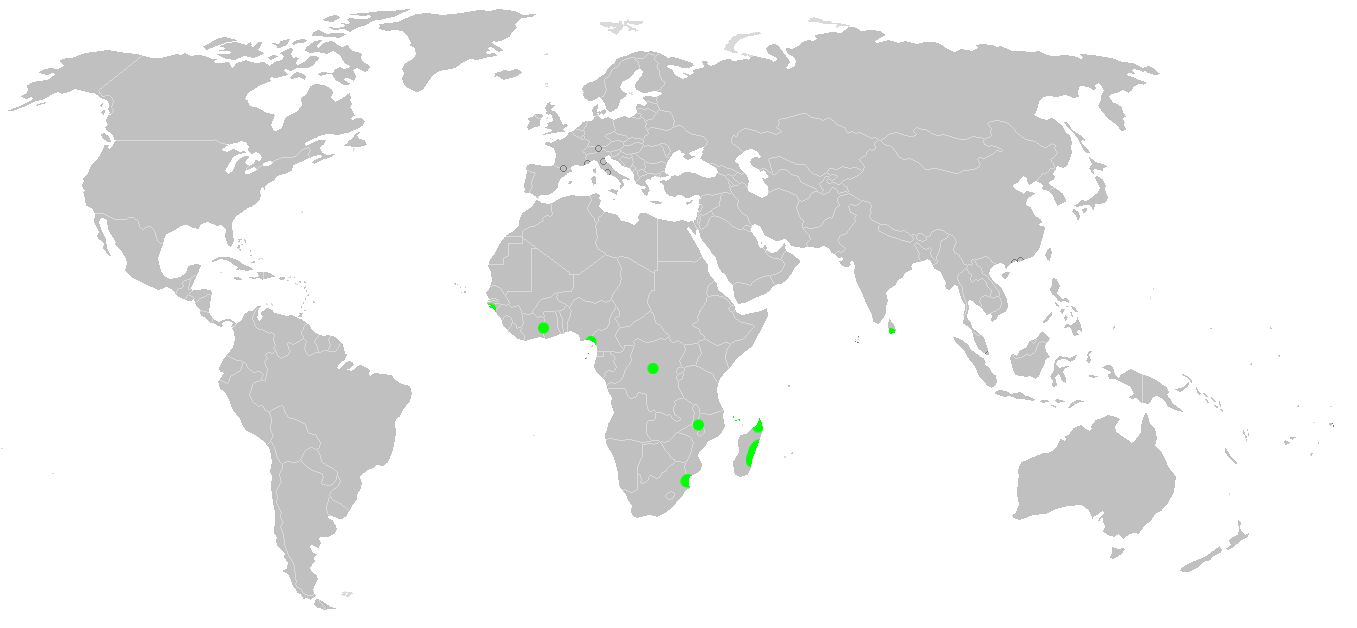

= Clitaetra =

Genus of spiders

Clitaetra is a genus of spiders in a family Nephilidae. It occurs in Africa, Madagascar and Sri Lanka, hinting to a Gondwanan origin. a split between Clitaetra and related genera may be as old as 160 million years.

== Description ==
Females have a total length of 5.7–9.9 mm, while males are smaller at 2.8–3.6 mm. The female carapace and chelicerae are yellow-grey, with the sternum yellow and bearing irregular white patches along the middle and four pairs of sternal slit sensilla.

The abdomen is pentagonal and dorsoventrally flattened, with five pairs of dorsomedian apodemes. The dorsum has a grey, brown and white pattern, while the venter has a broad white median stripe extending from the epigastric furrow to the spinnerets, with a broken white pattern around the spinnerets. The legs are whitish-yellow with dark brown spine-sockets and spines, and brown tarsi.

Males have a light brown sternum and both eye rows are recurved. The abdomen is oval with three pairs of dorsal apodemes and a dark brown scutum with a white frontal band. The venter is brown to dark grey, with three pairs of white dots around the spinnerets.

== Name ==
The etymology of the genus name is unknown.

== Taxonomy ==
The genus Clitaetra was transferred from Tetragnathidae to Nephilidae by Kuntner in 2006, and subsequently transferred from Nephilidae to Araneidae.

== Species ==
As of September 2025, this genus includes five species:

- Clitaetra clathrata Simon, 1907 – West Africa
- Clitaetra episinoides Simon, 1889 – Comoros, Mayotte (type species)
- Clitaetra irenae Kuntner, 2006 – Malawi, South Africa
- Clitaetra perroti Simon, 1894 – Madagascar
- Clitaetra simoni Benoit, 1962 – DR Congo
