= Matjaž Kuntner =

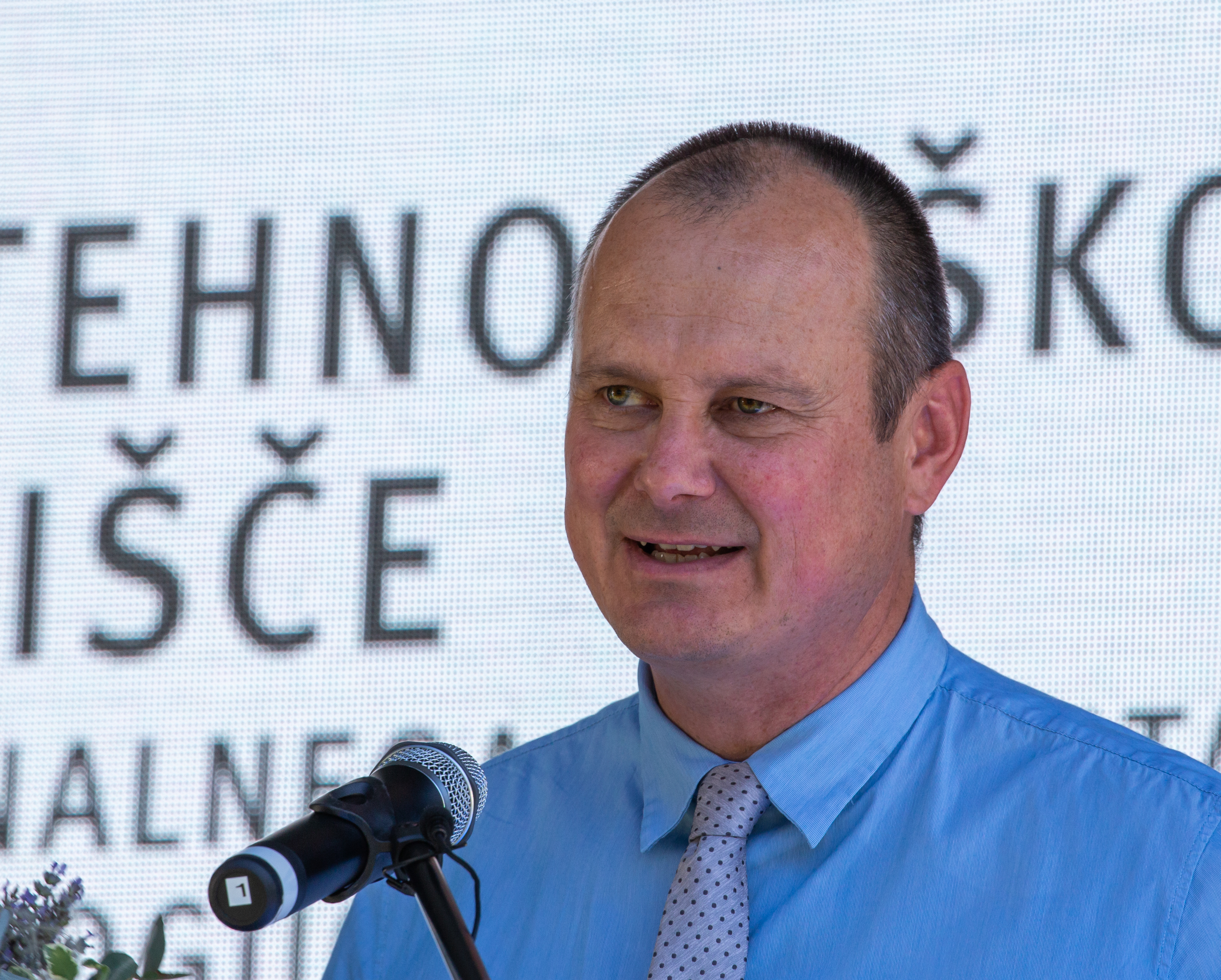
- Kuntner in 2021
- Born: 21 October 1971 (age 54); Ljubljana, Slovenia
- Education: University of Ljubljana, George Washington University
- Known for: Research on spiders, evolution, and biodiversity
- Awards: National Institute of Biology Award for Outstanding Achievements (2015), ZRC SAZU Golden Award (2021)
- Scientific career
- Fields: Evolutionary biology, systematics, arachnology, phylogenetics, biogeography
- Workplaces: National Institute of Biology, Research Centre of the Slovenian Academy of Sciences and Arts

Matjaž Kuntner (born 21 October 1971) is a Slovenian biologist. He is evolutionary biologist and arachnologist whose scientific work covers the fields of evolutionary systematics and taxonomy, biogeography, sexual selection, behavioral biology, the evolution of biological materials, and climate change.

Kuntner is considered one of Slovenia’s leading researchers in the biological sciences. His primary interest lies in advancing the science of biodiversity and its conservation. His research focuses mainly on spiders, covering a wide range of topics including the discovery of new species, definition of higher taxa, phylogenetic analyses, and studies involving morphological, behavioral, and genomic data. His work also includes evolutionary and coevolutionary analyses of biological traits, as well as biogeographic studies. He has also investigated the evolution of spider silk, known as the strongest biological material in nature.

== Career ==
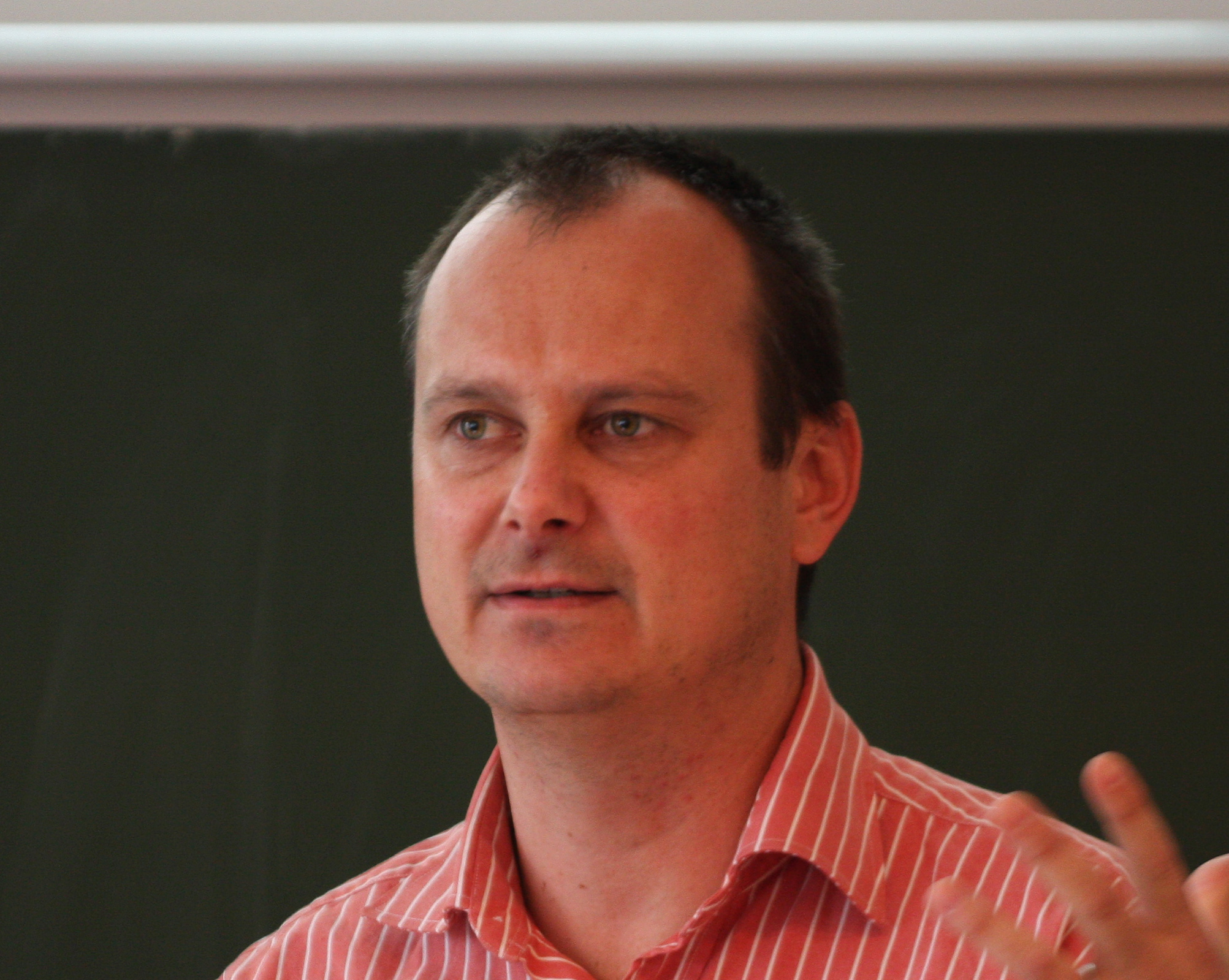
Kuntner in 2011

He earned his undergraduate degree in 1998 at the Biotechnical Faculty, University of Ljubljana and received his Ph.D. in 2005 at the George Washington University, United States. In 2006, he joined the Jovan Hadži Institute of Biology at the Research Centre of the Slovenian Academy of Sciences and Arts (ZRC SAZU), where he remains partially employed. From 2008 to 2017 he served as head of the institute, and from 2008 to 2019 he led its research program. In 2018, he became director of the National Institute of Biology, a position he held until 2020.

== Personal life ==
Kuntner was born in 1971 in Ljubljana to Sonja and Tone Kuntner. He attended the natural sciences gymnasium in Bežigrad. His father, Tone Kuntner, is a poet and actor, and his brother, Jernej Kuntner, is a theatre and television actor.

== Awards and recognition ==
- ZRC SAZU Golden Award (2021)
- Fulbright visiting scholar to the USA (Smithsonian Institution) (academic year 2016–2017)
- “Top New Species of 2016,” selected by Newsweek (2016)
- National Institute of Biology Award for Outstanding Achievements (2015)
- Guinness World Records: Darwin’s bark spider (Caerostris darwini Kuntner & Agnarsson, 2010) for the largest web and strongest silk (2012)
- Guinness World Records: largest known orb-weaving spider Nephila komaci Kuntner & Coddington, 2009 (2011)
- “Top 10 New Species for 2011,” selected by the International Institute for Species Exploration, Arizona State University
- “Top 10 New Species of 2010,” selected by Time magazine
