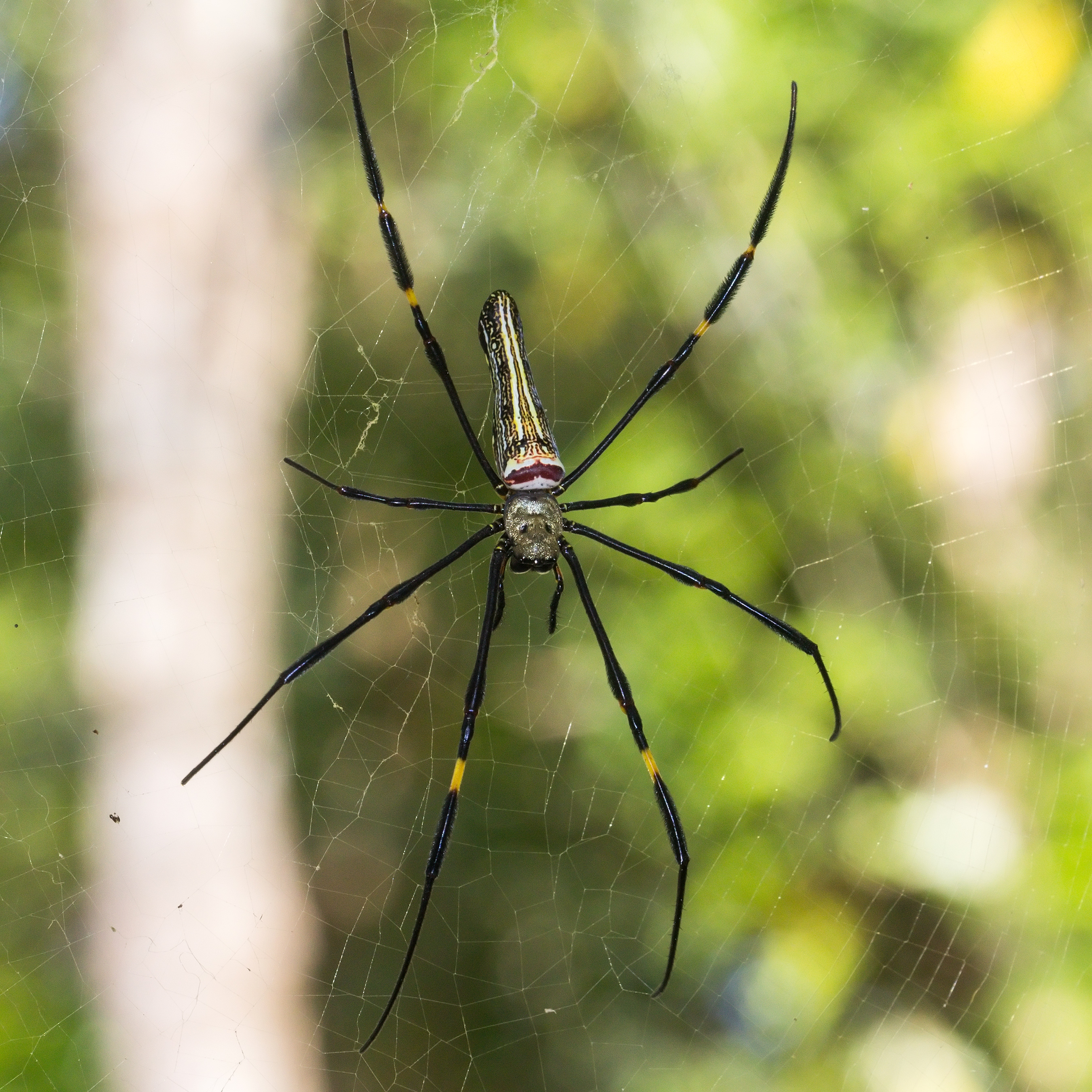
- Female Nephila pilipes

Scientific classification
- Kingdom: Animalia
- Phylum: Arthropoda
- Subphylum: Chelicerata
- Class: Arachnida
- Order: Araneae
- Infraorder: Araneomorphae
- Family: Araneidae
- Subfamily: Nephilinae; Simon, 1894

Genera
- See text.

Diversity
- 7 genera
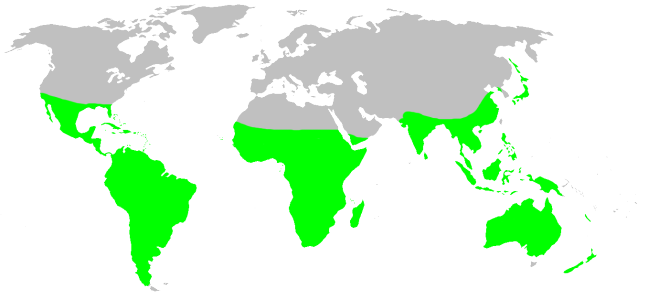

= Nephilinae =

Spider subfamily

Nephilinae is a spider subfamily in the family Araneidae, commonly referred to as golden orb-weavers. It has also been treated as the family Nephilidae. The various genera in the subfamily were formerly placed in Tetragnathidae. All nephiline genera partially renew their webs.

== Reproductive behavior ==
The genera Herennia, Nephilengys and Nephilingis display extreme sexually driven selection. The pedipalps of these genera have become highly derived by evolving enlarged, complex palpal bulbs which break off inside the females' copulatory openings after copulation. The broken palps serve as mating plugs, which makes future matings with a mated female more difficult. These genera of spiders also participate in mate guarding; a mated male will stand guard by his female and chase off other males, thereby increasing the mated male's paternity share. Mated males are castrated in the process of mate plugging, though this may be an advantage in mate guarding, as mated males have been observed to fight more aggressively and win more frequently than virgin males. So while the female spiders are still at least potentially polygamous, the males have become monogamous.

== Taxonomy ==
Up to the late 1980s, following Eugène Simon in 1894, Nephila and its close relatives were considered to make up the subfamily Nephilinae of the family Araneidae. In 1986, Herbert Walter Levi suggested that Nephila and Nephilengys belonged in the family Tetragnathidae, based on the structure of the male palp. Cladistic studies in the 1990s appeared to confirm the relationship between nephilines and Tetragnathidae. Further studies refuted this proposal, but did not resolve the relationship with araneids. In 2006, Matjaž Kuntner removed the group from Araneidae and raised the subfamily Nephilinae to the family Nephilidae. However, molecular phylogenetic studies from 2004 onwards consistently placed nephilids within Araneidae. Accordingly, in 2016, Dimitar Dimitrov et al. returned the group to their traditional position as a subfamily of Araneidae. As of January 2026, the group was recognized as a subfamily of Araneidae in the World Spider Catalog.

=== Phylogeny ===
A 2013 molecular phylogenetic study suggested that the genera of Nephilinae were related as shown in the cladogram below. It was this study that supported the split between Nephilengys and Nephilingis.

- Nephilinae
  - - Nephilengys
    - Herennia
  - - Nephila constricta + Nephila pilipes
    - - Nephilingis
      - - Clitaetra
        - remaining Nephila species

Although Nephila appears not to be monophyletic, the authors of the study did not suggest splitting the genus. The phylogeny suggests that male enforced monogamy, via plugging of the female copulatory ducts by males leaving behind their palpal bulbs, is ancestral to the nephilines, and was lost in Nephila and Clitaetra.

=== Genera ===
- Clitaetra Simon, 1889 – Africa, Madagascar, Sri Lanka
- Herennia Thorell, 1877 – South Asia, Australia
- Indoetra (previously a subgenus of Clitaetra) Kuntner, 2006 – Sri Lanka
- Nephila Leach, 1815 – pantropical
- Nephilengys L. Koch, 1872 – South Asia to north Australia
- Nephilingis Kuntner, 2013 – tropical South America and Africa
- Trichonephila (previously a subgenus of Nephila) Dahl, 1911 – pantropical

== Distribution ==
The subfamily has a pan-tropical distribution: species of Nephila, in particular, are found in tropical and subtropical environments in the Americas, Africa, Asia, and Australia.

== See also ==
- Spider families
