= Joro =

Joro or variation, may refer to:

== People ==
- jorō, a moniker for a historical class of geisha known for sleeping with customers
- jōro, a class of sex worker in historic Japanese red-light districts
- Jōrō Otoshiyori (上臈御年寄), a title used in the Shogunate, in the Ōoku
  - Lady Kasuga (1579–1643), the first Jōrō Otoshiyori
- Joro the Paver, a 1960s serial rapist from Sofia, Bulgaria

=== Fictional characters ===
- Joro, a fictional character from Japanese light novel Oresuki, see List of Oresuki characters
- Joro, a fictional character from Italian fantasy film Creators: The Past
- Joro, a fictional character from Italian comedy film God Willing (2006 film)
- Joro D, a fictional character from the Nigerian comedy film Chief Daddy
- Prince Joro, a fictional character created by Roman Frederick Starzl

== Places ==
- Joro, Asa, Afon, Kwara, Nigeria; a village, see List of villages in Kwara State
- Joro, Ussa, Lissam II, Taraba, Nigeria; a village, see List of villages in Taraba State
- Jōro Station (Japanese: 上呂駅, romanized: Jōro-eki), a rail station in Gero, Gifu, Japan

== Other uses ==
- "Joro" (Wizkid song), 2019
- Joro spider (Japanese: ジョロウグモ, 女郎蜘蛛, 上臈蜘蛛, Jorō-gumo)
- Joro toxin (JSTX), the toxin of the Joro spider
- JORO (formerly KSBK), a former radio station in Naha, Okinawa, Japan
- joro, a ritual offering for dispelling fady (taboo)
- joro, an initiation ceremony performed by the Lobi people

== See also ==
- Jorōgumo, Japanese mythological creature
- Yuki Jorō, Japanese mythological creature
