= Nephila polyamine toxin 8 =

Spider toxin

Names
- IUPAC name (2S)-N-[5-[3-[4-(3-aminopropylamino)butylamino]propanoylamino]pentyl]-2-[[2-(1H-indol-3-yl)acetyl]amino]butanediamide

Identifiers
CAS Number	114355-41-8
3D model (JSmol)	Interactive image
ChEMBL	ChEMBL2178919
PubChem CID	188869
CompTox Dashboard (EPA)	DTXSID90921336
- InChI: InChI=1S/C29H48N8O4/c30-12-8-15-32-13-6-7-14-33-18-11-27(39)34-16-4-1-5-17-35-29(41)25(20-26(31)38)37-28(40)19-22-21-36-24-10-3-2-9-23(22)24/h2-3,9-10,21,25,32-33,36H,1,4-8,11-20,30H2,(H2,31,38)(H,34,39)(H,35,41)(H,37,40)/t25-/m0/s1 Key: ILUCYJIKJBTHOD-VWLOTQADSA-N
- SMILES: C1=CC=C2C(=C1)C(=CN2)CC(=O)N[C@@H](CC(=O)N)C(=O)NCCCCCNC(=O)CCNCCCCNCCCN

Properties
Chemical formula	C_{29}H_{48}N_{8}O_{4}
Molar mass	572.755 g·mol^{−1}

Related compounds
Related compounds	Nephila polyamine toxin 1
- Except where otherwise noted, data are given for materials in their standard state (at 25 °C [77 °F], 100 kPa). Infobox references

NPTX-8

Identifiers
- Organism: Trichonephila clavata
- Symbol: N/A

Nephila polyamine toxin 8 (or NPTX-8) is a type of polyamine toxin found in the venom of the Trichonephila clavata spider. It is a potent inhibitor of ionotropic glutamate receptors, causing paralysis of insects.

== Etymology and source ==
The first word in the name "nephila polyamine toxin 8" (NPTX-8) is from the genus of the Trichonephila clavata spider (the Joro spider). Trichonephila clavata is native to East Asia and is found throughout China, Japan (except Hokkaidō), Korea, and Taiwan.

== Chemistry ==
NPTX-8 is a member of the Nephilatoxin family, and a type of polyamine toxin. Polyamine toxins are open channel blockers of ionotropic glutamate (iGlu) receptors., commonly produced by spiders and wasps

The general structure of this amphiphilic toxin can be summarised as: an aliphatic part, an amino acid linker and polyamine tail. NPTX-8 is similar in structure to related spider toxins, like JSTX and NSTX, which both affect neurotransmission. NPTX-8 is different from that of JSTX by having a 2,4-dihydroxyphenylacetyl residue.

NPTX-8 has an aromatic indole-3-acetyl head group connected to the N-termini of its hydrophilic part, made of basic amino acids and polyamines. This is a common structure between nephilatoxins 7, 8 and 9.

In the first article reporting the synthesis of NPTX-8, it is described that its hydrophilic part consists of an asparagine as the amino acid linker and a cadaverine and spermidine as the polyamine units.

== Target ==
NPTX-8 blocks ionotropic glutamate receptors - NMDA, AMPA, and kainate. However, its main effect is on non-NMDA subtypes, at synapses in vertebrates and invertebrates.

The toxin has been shown to be especially potent at kainate receptors and AMPA receptors, with inhibitory potencies summarised in the table:

Inhibitory potency of NPTX-8 at different types of iGlu receptors
	GluN1/2A	GluA1	GluK1	GluK2
NPTX-8 inhibitory potency (IC50, nM)	150 (rat), 91 (Xenopus laevis oocytes)	27 (rat), 19 (Xenopus laevis oocytes)	0.82 (rat)	0.51 (HEK 293 cells)

The inhibition of kainate receptors by NPTX-8 is voltage-dependent., where the toxin is more potent at lower membrane potentials - in accordance with what is observed in other polyamine channel blockers. At lower membrane potentials, it is possible to get an IC50 in rats of 0.28nM, which shows that NPTX-8 is one of the most potent polyamine toxins acting on the Kainate receptor

== Mode of action ==
This toxin acts as an open channel blocker of ionotropic glutamate receptors.

More information is known about the mode of action of NPTX-8 on kainate receptors among the iGlu receptor subtypes. Channel blocking occurs by binding of NPTX-8 inside the GluK2 ion channel pore. The hydrophobic head group locates to the central cavity, the positively charged polyamine tail occupies the selectivity filter, and the toxin forms numerous contacts within the GluK2 channel, resulting in its high potency.. The toxin enters the channel pore through the extracellular side, and this is followed by closing of the extracellular gate, which traps NPTX-8 within the pore

The asparagine (linker amino acid) in the structure of NPTX-8 is essential for this toxin to inhibit Glu receptors irreversibly. This linker amino acid is also thought to be important for selectivity among iGlu receptor types.

The indole head group in the structure of NPTX-8 is speculated to play a role in its unusually high potency at the GluK1 receptors.

Additionally, nephilatoxins such as NPTX-8 also have histamine-releasing activity, which has been associated with their polycationic part.

== Toxicity and treatment ==
NPTX-8 blocks glutamatergic neuromuscular junction transmission with high potency and affinity. As a result, this toxin causes paralysis of insects, however, no significant activity was reported in vertebrate models (including humans).

The effective dose (ED50) of NPTX-8 is 0.535μg/g in crickets, but there has been no published information on its LD50 as of yet.

There are no known treatments or antidotes for the biological effects and symptoms of NPTX-8 exposure.

== Therapeutic use ==
Ionotropic glutamate (iGlu) receptors are important drug targets due to their role in various neurological diseases, including Alzheimer’s disease, epilepsy, and stroke. NPTX-8 selectively interacts with these receptors, specifically AMPA and kainate subtypes.

NPTX-8, may be used as a molecular probe, or even serve as a lead for neuroprotective agents for non-NMDA glutamate receptors. Specifically, NPTX-8 selectively blocks calcium permeable AMPA and kainate receptors with very high potency, making it a promising neuropharmacological tool.

Research suggests that specific modifications to the polyamine tail of the toxin, thus creating synthetic analogues derived from NPTX-8 structure, may result in even greater selectivity against NMDA and higher potency at AMPA receptors.

Structural studies of NPTX-8 itself, in complex with kainate receptors, confirm its potential as a highly selective, high-affinity trapping blocker.
