= Nephila polyamine toxin 1 =

Names
- IUPAC name (2S)-N-[5-[3-[4-(3-aminopropylamino)butylamino]propanoylamino]pentyl]-2-[[2-(4-hydroxy-1H-indol-3-yl)acetyl]amino]butanediamide

Identifiers
3D model (JSmol)	Interactive image
ChEMBL	ChEMBL2178920
ChemSpider	9159979
PubChem CID	10984779
- InChI: InChI=1S/C29H48N8O5/c30-11-7-14-32-12-4-5-13-33-17-10-26(40)34-15-2-1-3-16-35-29(42)23(19-25(31)39)37-27(41)18-21-20-36-22-8-6-9-24(38)28(21)22/h6,8-9,20,23,32-33,36,38H,1-5,7,10-19,30H2,(H2,31,39)(H,34,40)(H,35,42)(H,37,41)/t23-/m0/s1 Key: ZBWQBTGXGZUFNG-QHCPKHFHSA-N
- SMILES: C1=CC2=C(C(=C1)O)C(=CN2)CC(=O)N[C@@H](CC(=O)N)C(=O)NCCCCCNC(=O)CCNCCCCNCCCN

Properties
Chemical formula	C_{29}H_{48}N_{8}O_{5}
Molar mass	588.754 g·mol^{−1}

Related compounds
Related compounds	Nephila polyamine toxin 8
- Except where otherwise noted, data are given for materials in their standard state (at 25 °C [77 °F], 100 kPa). Infobox references

Nephila polyamine toxin-1, also known as nephilatoxin-1 or NPTX-1, is a polyamine toxin found in the venom of the spider Trichonephila clavata (T. clavata). NPTX-1 acts as a neurotransmitter inhibitor by blocking open-channel ionotropic glutamate receptors (iGlu) that are crucial for chemical signaling. Containing a 4-hydroxyindole nucleus with an aromatic head group, this polyamine toxin acts as an effective paralyzer.

== Etymology and source ==
NPTX-1 is the abbreviated form for Nephilatoxin-1, an isolated polyamine toxin from the venom of the Trichonephila clavata, commonly known as the Joro spider, and belongs to the series of toxins (NPTX-1, -2, ...). 'NP' (Nephila-) comes from the name of the spider '[tricho]nephila'; 'TX' (-toxin) comes from the greek word ‘toxikon’; '-1' identifies it as the first toxin from this venom type that was characterized.

== Chemistry ==
=== Subtypes ===
The various NPTX subtypes are structurally very similar, thus subcategorized by their different aromatic head groups. NPTX-7–12 has an indole core, while NPTX-1–6 has a 4-hydroxyindole core.

=== Structure ===
Polyamine toxins are generally divided into four different regions: an aromatic head group, an amino acid linker, a polyamine tail, and an optional terminal amino acid. NPTX-1 (as well as other closely related toxins) has an asparagine amino acid linker and a polyamine tail, containing a β-alanine moiety. 4-hydroxyindole-3-acetic acid is the aromatic core of NPTX-1. The 3-acetic acid connects the aromatic indole nucleus to the rest of the polyamine side chain.

== Target ==
NPTX-1 targets open-channel ionotropic glutamate AMPA and NMDA receptors.

== Mode of action ==
NPTX-1 acts as a receptor antagonist by blocking open-channel iGlu receptors. Normally these receptors are activated by the binding of glutamate to the ion channel which causes the channels to open and allows ions to flow through. This mediates a large portion of excitatory synaptic transmission. NPTX-1 binds inside the pore after opening, blocking the ion flow.

NPTX-1 has a stronger affinity for AMPA receptors compared to NMDA receptors. This can be concluded from the IC50 of 80nM at NMDA (GluN1/2A) receptors and 27nM at AMPA (GluA1i) receptors. The mechanism of NPTX-1 is based off of the proposed inhibitory mechanism of NPTX-8, which involves the asparagine linker and the polyamine chain, possibly contributing to metal chelation and receptor inhibition.

== Toxicity and treatment ==
NPTX-1 blocks postsynaptic glutamatergic receptors, which shuts down excitatory glutamatergic neurotransmission in the central nervous system. This results in immediate immobilization of the nervous system, leading to paralysis in insects. T. Clavata spider bites have not been reported as lethal and are not known to predispose a higher risk in vertebrates (including humans). However, the specific effect of the subtype NPTX-1 on vertebrates remains unclear.

There are no known treatments or antidotes for the biological effects or symptoms of NPTX-1 exposure.

== Therapeutic use ==
iGlu receptors are involved in a large portion of neurological and psychiatric diseases, such as epilepsy and seizures. Both NPTX-1 and NPTX-8 are promising starting points for the development of potent and selective AMPA receptor open-channel blockers. NPTX-1 has greater AMPA selectivity relative to NMDA receptors allowing for a more specific drug. However, clinical development on iGlu antagonists has been limited due to side effects resulting from the inhibition of fast excitatory synaptic transmission.
