= Seiren =

Japanese anime romantic comedy TV series

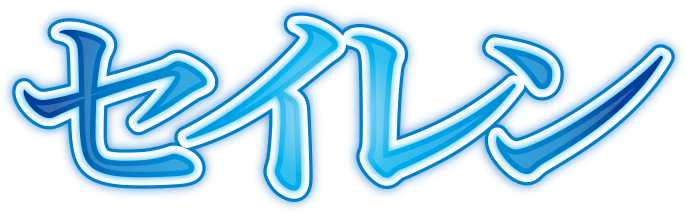

セイレン
- Genre: Romantic comedy
- Created by: Kisai Takayama
- Anime television series
- Directed by: Tomoki Kobayashi
- Produced by: Gō Tanaka; Ryōsuke Tsuboi; Gōta Aijima; Jun Funada
- Written by: Kisai Takayama
- Music by: Nobuaki Nobusawa
- Studio: Studio Gokumi; AXsiZ
- Licensed by: NA: Crunchyroll
- Original network: TBS, Sun TV, BS-TBS
- Original run: January 5, 2017 – March 23, 2017
- Episodes: 12

Seiren (Japanese: セイレン; from the kanji 清廉 "honesty") is an original Japanese romantic comedy anime television series directed by Tomoki Kobayashi at Studio Gokumi and AXsiZ. It aired on TBS between January 5 and March 23, 2017.

The series is structured like an anthology series, with every four episodes taking place in an individualized continuity in which protagonist Shōichi Kamita ends up with a different girl, yet featuring all of the same characters.

Seiren is a sequel to the similarly-structured Amagami adaptation, set in the same high school, albeit 9 years later.

== Plot ==
Shōichi Kamita is a second-year high school student who is worried about university exams and his future. In this point in his life, he comes into contact with various girls, and the series follows Shōichi and his relationships with them.

== Characters ==
=== Main characters ===
Shōichi Kamita (嘉味田正一, Kamita Shōichi)
Voiced by: Atsushi Tamaru
The protagonist of the series. A second year high school student who can't leave people in trouble alone. A bit of a pervert with a tendency to fantasize about naughty things, Shouichi is a lover of games, whether on home consoles, in arcades, or elsewhere.
Hikari Tsuneki (常木耀, Tsuneki Hikari)
Voiced by: Ayane Sakura
The class idol of class 2-B at Kibito High School and the runner-up of last year's "Miss Santa Contest". Described as a "modern day meddling princess", she is always cheerful and loves to eat, and is occasionally stubborn. She also has a part-time job working as a cook in a restaurant.
Tooru Miyamae (宮前透, Miyamae Tooru)
Voiced by: Shino Shimoji
A student in class 3-A at Kibito High School. She is skilled with her hands when playing video games or crafting original goods. She finds it hard for her to keep up a conversation with those who don't share her hobbies.
Kyōko Tōno (桃乃今日子, Tōno Kyōko)
Voiced by: Juri Kimura
A childhood friend of Shōichi and a first year student in Kibito High School. She is an honors student with high grades and loves to read Shōjo manga. She can act childish at times, which is an aspect of herself that she worries about.

=== Supporting characters ===
Ikuo Nanasaki (七咲郁夫, Nanasaki Ikuo)
Voiced by: Ryōta Asari
Shouichi's childhood friend, and the younger brother of Ai Nanasaki from Amagami, who was a bit of a prankster in elementary school. Thanks to his elder sister's influence, he eventually grew a more calm personality and became more studious.
Tomoe Kamita (嘉味田十萌, Kamita Tomoe)
Voiced by: Manami Numakura
The protagonist's only older sister who was last year's Miss Santa. She is in class 3-A at Kibito High School. With the personality of an air-headed idol, she naturally charms others, hence her popularity at her school. However, she secretly has a dirty mouth, swearing with little restraint.
Yukie Takato (高遠由貴恵, Takato Yukie)
Voiced by: Saki Fujita
One of Hikari's friends who used to like Tatsuya.
Yoko Kikuchi (菊池洋子, Kikuchi Yoko)
Voiced by: Yukiyo Fujii
One of Hikari's friends who participates in the school's swimming club.
Tatsuya Araki (荒木達也, Araki Tatsuya)
Voiced by: Takuya Eguchi
Shōichi's and Ikuo's friend who hangs out with them in the arcade. He is popular with the girls in Kibito High School and has a deep interest for animals.
Makoto Kamizaki (上崎真詩, Kamizaki Makoto)
Voiced by: Shiori Mikami
A first-year high school student who is part of the Public Morals Committee.
Ruise Sanjō (三条るいせ, Sanjō Ruise)
Voiced by: Honoka Kuroki
A second-year student and the current chairman of the Public Morals Committee in Kibito High School.
Masami Onigata (鬼型雅美, Onigata Masami)
Voiced by: Yukari Tamura
The homeroom teacher for class 2-B in Kibito High School.
Miu Hiyama (桧山水羽, Hiyama Miu)}
Voiced by: Shiori Izawa
A little bit naive about the world, she's a swimming club member from Sakuragawa East, an all girls' high school.
Toka Marushimi (丸石燈花, Marushimi Toka)
Voiced by: Juri Nagatsuma
She is the friend of Miu and is also a member of Sakuragawa East's swimming club.
Mako Yoshida (吉田麻子, Yoshida Mako)
Voiced by: Mai Kadowaki
Hikari Tsuneki's classmate in the "Save Our Scores" class during a cram school summer seminar.
Sōta Miyamae (宮前宗太, Miyamae Sōta)
Voiced by: Kentarō Tone
Toru's brother who works as a teacher in a cram school. He also participates in the cram school's yearly summer seminar, where he wears sunglasses and carries a bamboo stick to appear strict among the students.
Shiori Nagasawa (永沢栞, Nagasawa Shiori)
Voiced by: Yū Asakawa
A third-year student in Kibito High School who is friends with Tomoe and Toru. She is also the president of the Home Ec Club until the second semester.
Koharu Uno (宇野小春, Uno Koharu)
Voiced by: Yuka Ōtsubo
She is the president of the Home Ec Club after Shiori stepped down.
Nao Tokioka (時岡奈緒, Tokioka Nao)
Voiced by: Hitomi Harada
She is the vice-president of the Home Ec Club.
Takeshi Yuki (湯木健, Yuki Takeshi)
Voiced by: Natsumi Fujiwara
The son of the restaurant owner Hikari works for. He typically wears an eyepatch and plays in the arcade with his friends.

== Media ==
=== Anime ===
TBS revealed plans for a new anime series, with Kisai Takyama working on the project. This original anime television adaption was later officially named Seiren. The series is directed by Tomoki Kobayashi at Studio Gokumi and AXsiZ. It aired on TBS in Japan from January 5, 2017 to March 23, 2017. The series was also simulcasted in the United States of America, Canada, Australia, New Zealand, and Latin America on Crunchyroll. The series uses an omnibus format, in which each major character arc is a self-contained four-episode story. These major arcs are focused on three characters: Hikari Tsuneki, Toru Miyamae, and Kyōko Tōno. However, it was also noted that there were plans for character arcs involving Miu Hiyama, Makoto Kamizaki, and Ruise Sanjō in the future.

The opening theme, "Your Flower" (キミの花, Kimi no Hana), is sung by Hanako Oku. There are three ending themes. The first theme, "Moment Happening" (瞬間 Happening, Shunkan Happening), is sung by Ayane Sakura. The second theme, "Unrivalled Goddess" (ムテキの女神, Muteki no Megami) is sung by Shino Shimoji. The third theme, "Theory of Love" (恋のセオリー, Koi no Seorī), is sung by Juri Kimura.

==== Episode list ====
No.	Title (Note: All English titles are taken from Crunchyroll.)	Original release date
1	"Hikari Tsuneki Chapter 1 - Decision" "Tsuneki Hikari Dai 1 Shō - Ketsudan" (常木耀 第1章 - ケツダン)	January 5, 2017
2	"Hikari Tsuneki Chapter 2 - Deep in the Mountains" "Tsuneki Hikari Dai 2 Shō - Yamaoku" (常木耀 第2章 - ヤマオク)	January 12, 2017
3	"Hikari Tsuneki Chapter 3 - In the Men's Bath" "Tsuneki Hikari Dai 3 Shō - Otokoyu" (常木耀 第3章 - オトコユ)	January 19, 2017
4	"Hikari Tsuneki Chapter 4 - Starry Sky" "Tsuneki Hikari Sai shūshō - Hoshizora" (常木耀 最終章 - ホシゾラ)	January 26, 2017
5	"Toru Miyamae Chapter 1 - Exchange" "Miyamae Tōru Dai 1 Shō - Koukan" (宮前透第1章 - コウカン)	February 2, 2017
Shōichi is playing LOVE DEER with his two friends, Ikuo and Tatsuya, behind some stairs. They talk about how Shoichi has become the topic of conversation among girls because of the excited noises he makes while playing. Suddenly, a girl named Toru walks down the stairs and overhearing their conversation, wants to also play with them some time. He is immediately entranced by her gaming prowess and strives to become her equal, staying up late to increase the stats on his deer. As Toru becomes acquainted with the boys, they unexpectedly end up at karaoke, at the behest of Tatsuya's suggestion. As Ikuo and Shoichi worry because the only songs they know are anime openings and OSTs, Toru performs an anime song, oblivious to their worries. As she scoots back to her seat, Shoichi catches a glimpse of her cleavage and he blushes, trying his best to look away. The conversation at karaoke gradually moves towards a new game MILIBUN that will be released soon and they make plans to play together in their usual spot. After a montage sequence of the time skip, we arrive on the day they had planned to play MILIBUN. Because of some mishaps, the team ends up dying pretty early and they lose. Toru is sad that the boys may dislike the game now because of an unpleasant loss, but they are actually eager to play more. She thinks to herself how wonderful playing in a group is and is reminded of her middle school years. After school, they head to an arcade where Toru reignites her passion for a mecha game called Gusgal and asks Shoichi to be her partner, hoping to play competitively again. Shoichi is delighted at the prospect and they go home. Later that evening, as Toru is bathing, she smiles at the thought of playing Gusgal again, only to be interrupted by an out of view older boy who is telling her to hurry up and get out of the bath. The last scene the viewer sees is him approaching the bathroom door while taking his clothes off. Toru gets up from the bathtub in agreement.
6	"Toru Miyamae Chapter 2 - Versus" "Miyamae Tōru Dai 2 Shō - Taisen" (宮前透第2章 - タイセン)	February 9, 2017
7	"Toru Miyamae Chapter 3 - Brother Complex" "Miyamae Tōru Dai 3 Shō - Burakon" (宮前透第3章 - ブラコン)	February 16, 2017
Shoichi approaches Tsuneki about the arcade altercation the other day because he is worried about why Toru is not coming to school. He tries to pry into Toru's past which Tsuneki does not approve of. And of course, it turns out those two girls were part of a gamer club in middle school. Toru was a beast. Not only was she leagues above her male friends in gaming, but she was also superior in every other way, including grades and sports. Sadly, Toru crushed their egos, rejected all their advances, and was left all alone in the end. This is what Tsuneki meant the other day at the arcade because she was implying the current gaming group would also disband the same way. Shoichi makes a bold claim about never ever distancing from her and calls to check in on Toru. Apparently, she has been playing that Gusgal game on a console instead of going to school. She invites him to play at her house after school since both Araki and Ikuo have to clean the rabbit pen. When Shoichi arrives at her house, a really nice boy invites him in. Remember that eerie scene at the end of episode 5 with the brother undressing? that never became a plot point. Toru's older brother, Sota, is actually a really nice guy and is the person who introduced Toru to gaming. Also, Sota is the strict sunglasses-wearing cram school teacher who is afraid of modern high schoolers (aww). Sota shows Shoichi a video of a cute grade school Toru winning a competition and receiving a console as a prize (that smile was adorable). Shoichi and Toru eventually go to her room to play Gusgal. Not surprisingly, as soon as he walks in, he thinks to himself about how the smell of her sweat is turning him on. Toru suddenly has insecurities about how much she is leaning on Shoichi to play games with her. She reflects on how much her gaming has been worrying her brother and Shoichi, ultimately deciding that she wants to take a break for a while. Since that day, Shoichi has been alone with the rabbit stuffed toy. As he hugs the rabbit thinking about Toru, the rabbit cringes at his libido. Suddenly Toru shows up and asks him to help her at ComiMa (comicon) and they end up asking each other out. They have become partners outside of gaming. Exciting things are to come!
8	"Toru Miyamae Chapter 4 - Fluffy" "Miyamae Tōru Sai shūshō - Mofumofu" (宮前透最終章 - モフモフ)	February 23, 2017
9	"Kyōko Tōno Chapter 1 - Home Ec Club" "Tōno Kyōko Dai 1 Shō - Kateibu" (桃乃今日子 第1章 - カテイブ)	March 2, 2017
10	"Kyōko Tōno Chapter 2 - Hand-Me-Down" "Tōno Kyōko Dai 2 Shō - Osagari" (桃乃今日子 第2章 - オサガリ)	March 9, 2017
11	"Kyōko Tōno Chapter 3 - Awakening" "Tōno Kyōko Dai 3 Shō - Kakusei" (桃乃今日子 第3章 - カクセイ)	March 16, 2017
12	"Kyōko Tōno Chapter 4 - First Love" "Tōno Kyōko Sai shūshō - Hatsukoi" (桃乃今日子最終章 - ハツコイ)	March 23, 2017

=== Webcomic ===
In anticipation of the anime premiere, two official webcomics illustrated by Piaisai titled "Amagami Characters Do the Seiren Interview" (アマガミキャラによるセイレンインタビュー, Amagami Kyara Niyoru Seiren Intabyū) and "Seiren Heroines Do the Amagami Challenge!" (セイレンヒロインによるアマガミちゃれんじっ!, Seiren Hiroin Niyoru Amagami Chirenji!) were released. These webcomics involve characters from Seiren and the dating simulation game, Amagami.

== See also ==
- Amagami
- KimiKiss
