= Hinoto =

Hinoto may refer to:

- Hinoto, a former Japanese village which was merged in 1889 into Tamayama, Iwate
- Hinoto, the Japanese name for the fourth of the Heavenly Stems
- Hinoto, a marker used in Japanese kanbun

People and fictional characters with the name Hinoto include:

- Alberto Hinoto (1970–1996), Brazilian guitarist, member of Mamonas Assassinas
- Princess Hinoto, character in the manga series X
- Hinoto Kashibana, character in the light novel series Oresuki
- Go Hinoto and Tyra Hinoto, characters in the manga series Biomega
