= Honoka Kuroki =

Japanese voice actress

- 黒木 ほの香
- Born: October 21, 1995 (age 30); Osaka Prefecture, Japan
- Occupation: Voice actress
- Years active: 2016–present
- Agent: Stardust Promotion (2016-2025)
- Notable work: Seiren as Ruise Sanjō; The Idolmaster Shiny Colors as Amana Ōsaki
- Height: 161 cm (5 ft 3 in)

Honoka Kuroki (黒木 ほの香, Kuroki Honoka; born October 21, 1995) is a Japanese voice actress who was affiliated with Stardust Promotion but is now currently freelance. She is known for her roles as Ruise Sanjō in Seiren and Amana Ōsaki in The Idolmaster Shiny Colors. She was also a member of the idol unit SoundOrion.

== Filmography ==
=== Anime ===
2016

- Orange as Nagano (episode 2)

2017

- Seiren as Ruise Sanjō
- A Centaur's Life as Inukai

2019

- BanG Dream! 2nd Season as Live guest
- Hitori Bocchi no Marumaru Seikatsu as Ito Kurie

2020

- Yatogame-chan Kansatsu Nikki as Mutsuki Ittenmae

2022

- RPG Real Estate as Mona
- Teppen!!!!!!!!!!!!!!! Laughing 'til You Cry as Iroha Akishika
- Harem in the Labyrinth of Another World as Miria

2023

- The Demon Sword Master of Excalibur Academy as Sakuya

2024

- The Idolmaster Shiny Colors as Amana Ōsaki

2025

- Miru: Paths to My Future as Clara

=== Games ===
2018

- The Idolmaster Shiny Colors as Amana Ōsaki

2021

- League of Legends as Vex

2023

- Sentimental Death Loop as Noa Asahi

2025

- Fate/Grand Order as Kurohime

2026

- Marvel Tokon: Fighting Souls as Ms. Marvel
