= Harem in the Labyrinth of Another World =

Japanese light novel series and its franchise

- First light novel volume cover, featuring Roxanne

異世界迷宮でハーレムを (Isekai Meikyū de Haremu o)
- Genre: Harem; Isekai
- Novel series
- Written by: Shachi Sogano
- Published by: Shōsetsuka ni Narō
- Original run: 2011 – 2019
- Light novel
- Written by: Shachi Sogano
- Illustrated by: Shikidouji
- Published by: Shufunotomo
- Imprint: Hero Bunko
- Original run: December 21, 2012 – present
- Volumes: 13
- Manga
- Written by: Shachi Sogano
- Illustrated by: Issei Hyōju
- Published by: Kadokawa Shoten
- Magazine: Monthly Shōnen Ace
- Original run: April 26, 2017 – present
- Volumes: 12
- Anime television series
- Directed by: Naoyuki Tatsuwa
- Produced by: Mitsuhiro Ogata; Satoshi Motonaga; Aya Iizuka; Nobuhiko Kurosu; Akihiko Sotokawa; Taiyou Matsuda
- Written by: Kurasumi Sunayama
- Music by: Tomoki Kikuya
- Studio: Passione
- Licensed by: Crunchyroll: SA/SEA: Medialink
- Original network: AT-X (uncensored); Tokyo MX, BS11 (censored)
- Original run: July 6, 2022 – September 21, 2022
- Episodes: 12 + 2 OVAs
- icon

Harem in the Labyrinth of Another World (Japanese: 異世界迷宮でハーレムを, Hepburn: Isekai Meikyū de Haremu o; lit. "Building a Harem in Alternate World Dungeon") is a Japanese light novel series written by Shachi Sogano and illustrated by Shikidouji. It was serialized online from 2011 to 2019 on the user-generated novel publishing website Shōsetsuka ni Narō. It was later acquired by Shufunotomo, who have published thirteen volumes since December 2012 under their Hero Bunko imprint. A manga adaptation with art by Issei Hyōju has been serialized in Kadokawa Shoten's shōnen manga magazine Monthly Shōnen Ace since April 2017. It has been collected in twelve tankōbon volumes. An anime television series adaptation produced by Passione aired from July to September 2022.

== Plot ==
Michio Kaga plays an online game that seemingly uses virtual reality. After having fun, he finds he cannot log out and has seemingly entered a fantasy world for real. Making a living by exploring a monster-filled labyrinth and by defeating and turning in bandits, he is enticed by a beautiful slave girl named Roxanne and purchases her. After treating her as an equal partner and becoming lovers with her, he is inspired to purchase more slave girls and build himself a harem.

== Characters ==
Michio Kaga (加賀 道夫, Kaga Michio)
Voiced by: Taku Yashiro
Michio is a human who abruptly finds himself displaced into the setting of a cheap online fantasy game, but can no longer return to the real world. His cheat abilities in the game include analyzing everything around him, enabling him to assess their strengths and weaknesses. With a perceptive mind and his skills in kendo, he is able to hold his own in this new, dangerous environment, eventually gaining five female slaves and treating them as equals.
Roxanne (ロクサーヌ, Rokusānu)
Voiced by: Shiori Mikami
Roxanne is a wolfkin who becomes Michio's first slave and party member. She became a slave after the death of her parents and her aunt being unable to care for her anymore. They first met when Michio purchased Roxanne from her owner. Despite her status, Roxanne does love Michio.
Sherry (セリー, Serī)
Voiced by: Shiori Izawa
Sherry is a dwarf who becomes Michio's second slave and party member. Due to her thin ears, which makes her looks older, she was cheaper to buy. Sherry is exceptionally intelligent and frequently asked more direct or probing questions than Roxanne.
Miria (ミリア)
Voiced by: Honoka Kuroki
Miria is a catkin who becomes Michio's third slave and party member. Her obsession with fish led her to becoming a slave as she stole some from a sacred pond. Miria is still learning the magical language in the books, and communicates through Roxanne.
Vesta (ベスタ, Besuta)
Voiced by: Rina Honnizumi
Vesta is a dragonkin who becomes Michio's fourth slave and party member. Vesta has been a slave her entire life due to her parents being slaves themselves.
Rutina (ルティナ)
Voiced by: Mikako Izawa
Rutina is an elf who becomes Michio's fifth slave and party member. She is a former noble who was forced into slavery.
Allen (アラン, Aran)
Voiced by: Kenta Miyake
Allen is a slave merchant in Vale. Having a friendly personality, he treats his slaves well and ensures they find good homes.
Somara (ソマーラ, Somāra)
The chief of the village that Michio first ended up in.
Hugo (ウーゴ, Ūgo)
Voiced by: Wataru Isami
The leader of a gang of bandits who was killed by Michio.

== Media ==
=== Light novel ===
No.	Release date	ISBN
1	December 21, 2012	978-4-07-285942-1
2	April 30, 2013	978-4-07-289673-0
3	November 29, 2013	978-4-07-293798-3
4	May 30, 2014	978-4-07-297187-1
5	April 27, 2015	978-4-07-413191-4
6	December 28, 2015	978-4-07-414322-1
7	February 27, 2017	978-4-07-423657-2
8	November 30, 2017	978-4-07-428637-9
9	December 28, 2018	978-4-07-436358-2
10	March 30, 2020	978-4-07-442821-2
11	December 28, 2020	978-4-07-447190-4
12	January 31, 2022	978-4-07-449757-7
13	April 30, 2024	978-4-07-459483-2

=== Manga ===
A manga adaptation illustrated by Issei Hyōju began serialization in Kadokawa Shoten's Monthly Shōnen Ace on April 26, 2017.

No.	Release date	ISBN
1	November 25, 2017	978-4-04-106205-0
2	April 26, 2018	978-4-04-106721-5
3	October 26, 2018	978-4-04-107475-6
4	April 26, 2019	978-4-04-107476-3
5	January 24, 2020	978-4-04-109048-0
6	August 26, 2020	978-4-04-109731-1
7	April 26, 2021	978-4-04-109732-8
8	March 25, 2022	978-4-04-112122-1
9	February 25, 2023	978-4-04-113429-0
10	January 26, 2024	978-4-04-114549-4
11	February 26, 2025	978-4-04-115863-0
12	January 23, 2026	978-4-04-117040-3

=== Anime ===
An anime television series adaptation was announced on December 10, 2020. It was produced by Passione and directed by Naoyuki Tatsuwa, with scripts written by Kurasumi Sunayama, character designs handled by Makoto Uno, and music composed by Tomoki Kikuya. The series aired from July 6 to September 21, 2022, on AT-X and other networks. The opening theme song "Oath" was performed by Shiori Mikami, while the ending theme song "Shinshi no Torihiki 60-Man Naal" (紳士の取引60万ナール) was performed by Taku Yashiro and Kenta Miyake. Crunchyroll streamed the series. An original video animation is bundled with the series' first Blu-ray and DVD box sets, which were released on November 25, 2022. Another OVA was released with the series' second Blu-ray and DVD box sets on December 23, 2022.

==== Episodes ====
No.	Title (Note: All English titles are taken from Crunchyroll.)	Directed by	Written by	Storyboarded by	Original release date
1	"Encounter"; Transliteration: "Deai" (Japanese: 出会)	Hironori Aoyagi	Kurasumi Sunayama	Naoyuki Tatsuwa	July 6, 2022
Michio Kaga begins playing a cheap online game he believes is virtual reality. The village is attacked by bandits, and he kills several with his sword Durendal. Somara, the village chief, rewards him with the bandits' equipment. When Kaga attempts to log out, he realizes the world around him is genuine and he must complete the game beforehand. A villager attempts to steal Kaga's captured loot and is sentenced to slavery. To sell his loot, the thief and collect the bandits' bounty, Kaga travels to the city of Vale. There, he collects the bounty and visits Alan, a slave trader, who purchases the thief and reveals a new labyrinth has been discovered nearby. As Kaga is intrigued by the labyrinth, Alan suggests purchasing a slave, in particular, a slave named Roxanne. As she is a Wolfkin, she is useful in combat and is also a guaranteed virgin should he want her as a sex slave. Feeling guilty over considering it, Kaga is nonetheless dazzled by the possibility of a willing sex slave and Alan's smooth sales talk so he impulsively agrees to return in five days with the almost 450,000 gold needed to purchase Roxanne.
2	"Raising Money"; Transliteration: "Kinsaku" (Japanese: 金策)	Yasuhiro Geshi	Kurasumi Sunayama	Takashi Sano	July 13, 2022
An older Kaga visits the village he first woke up in, now with five female slaves. Seeing a young boy named Mio, he gives Mio a sword called Scimitar of Rage. Roxanne is curious, but Kaga only admits he knew Mio's father. In the present, Kaga has sold his loot but still needs another 70,000. To earn money quickly, he decides to enter the labyrinth to loot valuables. Fearing his sword Durendal is too tempting for thieves, he hides it within his character menu and purchases a basic scimitar. Entering the labyrinth, he begins to experiment with the skills he has acquired. After slaying monsters, he notices depleting his magic causes depression, so he decides to avoid spellcasting until he can increase his magic capacity. After his first day, he earns a pittance on loot, meaning he must defeat more dangerous monsters for more valuable loot. Accidentally falling into a monster nest, he almost dies, only kept alive by Durendal's health and magic absorption enchantments. After defeating the nest, he returns to Vale and learns the comrades of the bandits he killed are in the area. Kaga decides to hunt them for the bounty.
3	"Acquisition"; Transliteration: "Kakutoku" (Japanese: 獲得)	Satoshi Saga	Kurasumi Sunayama	Takashi Sano	July 20, 2022
Reasoning that bandits would want to stay hidden, Kaga visits the slums and discovers parts of the city becomes a red-light district after sunset. Despite the many distractions, Kaga locates a bandit and follows him to their headquarters. As there are a large number of separate bandit gangs, Kaga observes them to learn their habits. His landlord informs him bandits began murdering each other after an important boss was killed in an attempt to take over his territory. The bandits Kaga had killed before this were members of a losing gang the other bandits had driven out of Vale. With less than 24 hours to purchase Roxanne, Kaga makes his move. Infiltrating the headquarters, Kaga is able to kill several bandits in their sleep but is forced to teleport into the labyrinth when other bandits are alerted. Trading them in for the bounty, Kaga finally has enough money and purchases Roxanne from Alan. Roxanne surprises Kaga by apologizing for doubting he would be able to buy her. With the slave contract in place, Roxanne is happy to have an owner and Kaga is able to relax now he has succeeded in buying her.
4	"Graduation"; Transliteration: "Sotsugyō" (Japanese: 卒業)	Kazuomi Koga	Kurasumi Sunayama	Takeo Takahashi	July 27, 2022
With his extra money, Kaga is able to afford a larger room. Roxanne is noticeably nervous and Kaga realizes he mistakenly got a room with a double bed, compared to two single beds, and is afraid the thought of sharing a bed scared her. He is able to reassure her that as well as sharing his bed he mostly wants her to accompany him into the labyrinth as a fighter. After purchasing all Roxanne's adventuring equipment, including underwear, they return to their room. Roxanne proves adept at repairing and maintaining equipment, but they both grow more nervous as night approaches. Kaga is unable to stop himself from looking at and touching Roxanne's body, but feels incredibly guilty for it. Despite the awkwardness, they manage to wash each other's backs, Roxanne's tail and shampoo each other's hair. Finally, they get into bed together and, while trying to make sure Roxanne enjoys herself as much as he does, they have sex. The next morning, Roxanne kisses him but Kaga suspects she only did so because he asked her to before they fell asleep. Regardless, Kaga decides to begin their first trip into the labyrinth.
5	"Crystal"; Transliteration: "Kesshō" (Japanese: 結晶)	Hodaka Kuramoto	Atsuo Ishino	Naruyo Takahashi	August 3, 2022
Kaga asks Roxanne how to add skills to his equipment and is told he must locate a rare monster skill crystal and have a blacksmith bond it to the equipment. Unfortunately, only dwarves have the blacksmith ability and they are often untrustworthy. Kaga decides to find a trustworthy dwarf and make them a party member. Inside the labyrinth, Kaga learns that Magic Crystals can be filled with monster magic and sold for incredible sums but can take months to accomplish. Purchasing two empty crystals, Kaga learns they can hold magic from 1 million monsters, but most people sell them after 100,000. He also learns labyrinths are alive and grow upwards, so the first floor is actually the lowest, while the strongest monsters are on the top floors. Kaga decides he needs spells that attack multiple targets. As they also require healing spells, both Kaga and Roxanne gain the title of Monk by defeating a monster with their bare hands. At night, they repeat their ritual of bathing each other before making love. The next day, they locate the room of the first floor Boss Monster and head inside to defeat it.
6	"Trials"; Transliteration: "Shiren" (Japanese: 試練)	Satoshi Saga	Kurasumi Sunayama	Satoshi Saga	August 10, 2022
After defeating the Tree type boss, Roxanne picks up a medicinal leaf it dropped and gains the title Herbalist. For defeating the boss, they are granted access to Floor 2, but Kaga also desires the Herbalist title, so they return to the first floor to fight the boss again. With the Herbalist title, Kaga is able to use the medicinal leaf to create health potions. Returning to the city, Kaga notices a bandit watching Alan's trading house and warns him. Alan explains he recently sold the thief that Kaga had sold to him, but he was bought by dangerous looking men, suspecting the thief was actually a bandit the whole time, and the men who bought him were members of his gang. As the thief is still in the trading house, Alan suspects he was told to wait until everyone was asleep and unlock the door to let the bandits inside. As Roxanne has fond memories of Alan's other servants, Kaga requests to be hired as a bodyguard. After spending the evening in bed, Roxanne and Kaga return to the trading house at night and join Alan's combat slaves to ambush the bandits.
7	"Magic"; Transliteration: "Mahō" (Japanese: 魔法)	Shun'ichi Katō	Kurasumi Sunayama	Hiroshi Matsuzono	August 17, 2022
The bandits fall into the ambush. Kaga spots the thief and tries to apprehend him with experimental magic. When he uses the spell Equivalent Exchange, it causes a Self Destruct orb the thief was carrying to explode. Alan rewards Kaga for protecting his shop. Almost fatally low on magic, Kaga decides to enter the labyrinth to harvest magic from monsters and finds that using Equivalent Exchange unlocked the Mage title. He decides to buy a staff at the next opportunity but suddenly stumbles across the second floor's boss room, containing a giant caterpillar which he and Roxanne quickly defeat. Entering the third floor, they find the new monsters are Kobolds. Returning to the surface, Kaga hires a mage to teleport him to Imperial City and then to Quratar so that in the future he can teleport himself and Roxanne there for free. That night, they once again relax. Kaga becomes determined to buy a house so Roxanne no longer has to put up with living in taverns. Teleporting to Quratar, Kaga learns adventurers are charged a fee every time they enter the labyrinth until Roxanne points out they can sneakily teleport inside for free.
8	"New Home"; Transliteration: "Shinkyo" (Japanese: 新居)	Hironori Aoyagi	Atsuo Ishino	Takayuki Gotan	August 24, 2022
In Quratar, Kaga purchases a wand and begins looking for homes to rent, deciding to settle in a smaller rural village on the outskirts of Quratar. With Roxanne's expertise, they are able to find and rent a large house reasonably close to the labyrinth with a flushing toilet, even getting a discount on the rent due to the neglected garden and a strange stone room built without permission by the previous tenant. They enter the Vale labyrinth where Kaga uses his wand to defeat a monster. As their new home has no furniture until it is delivered the following day, they spend their last night in the first room they rented together. Roxanne begins preparing the house while Kaga visits Quratar's labyrinth. As he cannot teleport inside the labyrinth without having been inside it once already, he is forced to pay the fee to enter then immediately teleports back home. Kaga is disappointed that, compared to Vale's labyrinth, Quratar's is overcrowded by knights, adventurers, and explorers and so competition for monsters and loot will be more intense. After their furniture is delivered, Kaga and Roxanne spend their first night together in their new home.
9	"Bath"; Transliteration: "Furo" (Japanese: 風呂)	Shigeru Fukase	Atsuo Ishino	Naruyo Takahashi	August 31, 2022
Kaga learns that despite the overcrowding, no one has ever beaten the entire Quratar labyrinth, and the highest floor ever reached was the 91st. Kaga is disappointed at how weak the first boss monster is so he and Roxanne teleport home. To alleviate his depression, they decide to begin cultivating the neglected garden. While shopping for a clothes washing tub, Kaga realizes an extra-large tub could serve as an indoor bath in the stone room, which he hopes to share with Roxanne. As they continually reach higher floors, they are then able to teleport to without starting again from the bottom floor. The difficulty of the boss monsters increase until they reach one that is actually able to injure them with a unique magic skill. Kaga realizes he unintentionally became complacent, putting himself and Roxanne at risk. The bathtub is later delivered and Kaga is able to introduce Roxanne to bathing, and they make love, which is made more exciting by Kaga inventing soap. As Roxanne sleeps, Kaga feels guilty over letting her get injured by the last boss monster and decides they need another warrior in their party as soon as possible.
10	"Melancholy"; Transliteration: "Yūshū" (Japanese: 憂愁)	Shun'ichi Katō; Hironori Aoyagi	Atsuo Ishino	Takashi Sano	September 7, 2022
Kaga realizes clothing stores are willing to pay for monster rabbit skins and begins hunting them. Reaching the seventh floor boss, Kaga and Roxanne find it is a Rapid Rabbit that drops quality meat as loot, which Roxanne turns into a fine dinner. They decide to defeat the Rapid Rabbit again but meet another adventurer who has been on floor six for years preparing to fight the Rapid Rabbit. Unfortunately, the Rapid Rabbit kills him. Kaga is deeply affected by this and is unable to come to terms with the realization that adventurers die in labyrinths all the time and one day it could be him or Roxanne. After Roxanne spends the night comforting him, he resolves to get over his depression. They sell their rabbit skins and Kaga purchases silk camisoles for Roxanne. On the seventh floor, a bull monster breaks Kaga's finger, and though he recovers by magic, he is again affected by how dangerous the labyrinth is becoming. While bathing he introduces Roxanne to oral sex. The next day, Roxanne realizes a monster has finally dropped a Skill Stone as loot, the kind used by dwarven blacksmiths to add magic skills to equipment.
11	"Order"; Transliteration: "Junban" (Japanese: 順番)	Mitsuki Kitamura; Fujiaki Asari	Kurasumi Sunayama	Takeo Takahashi	September 14, 2022
Kaga decides to write his last will and testament, ensuring Roxanne is freed upon his death. Roxanne refuses as she would see his death as her failure and she would prefer to die too. Kaga visits Alan hoping to purchase a dwarf slave with the Blacksmithing skill. Alan possesses only one dwarf slave, a 16-year-old named Sherry; unfortunately, she is neither a blacksmith nor suited to combat. Sherry explains she has Explorer level 10, which is the usual requirement to gain the Blacksmith skill, but the skill never appeared. Regardless, Sherry sincerely asks Kaga to buy her. Roxanne notices Sherry has small ears, a sign of advanced age in dwarves. Alan assures Kaga it is a birth defect and Sherry is indeed 16, but does agree to lower the asking price. Kaga purchases Sherry with Roxanne's approval, though he cannot be certain if Roxanne seemed jealous or not. Kaga decides Sherry will experiment with gaining multiple skills in the hope she will unlock her Blacksmith skill, starting with equipping her with a hammer as her weapon. Sherry is shocked Kaga can use magic, especially his Teleport spell, and that he treats slaves like equals, not property.
12	"Humans"; Transliteration: "Ningen" (Japanese: 人間)	Yūsuke Kubo	Kurasumi Sunayama	Yūsuke Kubo	September 21, 2022
Sherry selects a wooden club as her weapon, which Kaga notices has a skill slot. He is surprised no one else can see skill slots. Over dinner, Kaga almost serves Sherry first, earning him a death glare from Roxanne, so he quickly serves her first. He is shocked to learn, that while Blacksmith is a title specific to the Dwarf species, the only title specific to humans is Sex Maniac. Later, while bathing, Roxanne teaches Sherry how to clean Kaga's body with their breasts. At bedtime, Kaga makes another mistake by kissing Sherry before Roxanne. Through very quick thinking, he is able to justify kissing Roxanne second, which she accepts. Having learned his lesson, Kaga has sex with Roxanne first while Sherry watches. Kaga is careful to make sure Sherry is comfortable as he takes her virginity, with Roxanne helping in a threesome. In the morning, Kaga has unlocked the Sex Maniac title, though he is happy at how much it increases his stamina, intelligence and magic. Deciding to take advantage of his new title, Kaga announces his intention to form a harem and acquires three more slaves; Miria the Catkin, Vesta the Dragonkin, and Rutina the Elf.
13 (OVA)	"After Washing Your Body..."; Transliteration: "Karada o Aratta Ato wa......" (Japanese: 体を洗ったあとは......)	Naoyuki Tatsuwa	Kurasumi Sunayama	Naruse Takahashi	November 25, 2022
In bed, Kaga plays with Roxanne's breasts and reminds her that he will not do anything without her permission. She begs him to make love to her, so he does. After they climax, she buries his face in her cleavage and he says he is in Heaven.
14 (OVA)	"Until the Very End with Roxanne."; Transliteration: "Rokusānu to Saigo Made." (Japanese: ロクサーヌと最後まで。)	Naoyuki Tatsuwa	Kurasumi Sunayama	Naruse Takahashi	December 23, 2022
In the bathtub, Roxanne uses her breasts to clean Kaga's body. He makes love to her in the bath, then again just outside it. Back in the bath, she marvels at the wonders of soap, while he says she would always be beautiful even without it.
