= Momo Kyun Sword =

Japanese light novel series and its adaptations

- Poster of Momo Kyun Sword

モモキュンソード (Momo Kyun Sōdo)
- Genre: Action; Magical girl
- Light novel
- Written by: Kibidango Project
- Original run: 2012 – 2013/2014
- Anime television series
- Directed by: Shinsuke Yanagi
- Written by: Gō Tamai
- Music by: Yasunori Iwasaki
- Studio: Project No.9; Tri-Slash
- Licensed by: Sentai Filmworks
- Original network: Tokyo MX; Sun TV; KBS; TV Aichi; AT-X; BS11; TVQ
- Original run: July 8, 2014 – September 23, 2014
- Episodes: 12
- icon

Momo Kyun Sword (モモキュンソード, Momo Kyun Sōdo) is a Japanese light novel series by Kibidango Project, based on the Japanese folklore hero Momotarō. The light novel began serialization for free online in 2012. It features multiple illustrators who are rotated on a monthly basis. A "second season" of the light novel began serialization in 2013. A free 4-panel manga is also serialized online. An anime television series adaptation by Project No.9 and Tri-Slash aired between July and September 2014.

== Plot ==
Set in Feudal Japan, the anime follows a girl who found inside a magical peach by a peasant couple, who raised her as their daughter. The couple names her Momoko and sees her develop into a young woman who is trained in combat along the way by three magical animals. When her village is attacked by demons, she decides to find the fragments of the Michimi Peach along with the Celestial Maiden Squad before the demons can collect those.

== Characters ==
Momoko (桃子)
Voiced by: Ayana Taketatsu
The protagonist. Based on Momotarō, Momoko is a young swordswoman who was born from a giant peach. She can combine with her animal-god friends, Momokyun Possession, to fuse their strengths and obtain more powers. She discovers Onihime is her twin sister.
Inugami (犬神)
Voiced by: Wataru Hatano
The Dog God and one of Momoko's companions. He has plenty of knowledge and holds manners as something very important. However, due to this, he is sometimes argumentative. Inugami is most skilled at close combat.
Sarugami (猿神)
Voiced by: Showtaro Morikubo
The Monkey God, one of Momoko's companions. Unlike Inugami, he is the kind of creature to take action before thinking. He is best at hand-to-hand combat. He tends to give points to Momoko.
Kijigami (雉神)
Voiced by: Asami Imai
The Pheasant God, one of Momoko's companions and the only female of the group. She can transform into a human, and is thought of by Momoko as an elder sister-like figure. She is best at aerial combat and reconnaissance.
Sumeragi Tennyo (皇天女)
Voiced by: Masumi Asano
Sumeragi is the leader of all of Heaven. She sends Momoko and her friends to search for the shards of the Michimi Peach to stop the ogres from taking them. As they do this, she watches over them warmly.
Ringo (林檎)
Voiced by: Shiori Mikami
The Celestial Maiden of fire. Her name means "apple". Ringo is bright and lively, and also has the strongest sense of justice within her team. She is always worrying about Momoko.
Suika (水花)
Voiced by: Suzuko Mimori
The Celestial Maiden of water. Her name means "watermelon". She is quite harsh toward her allies, but is actually very kind. Her weapon is a Cakraratna.
Karin (花梨)
Voiced by: Yuka Ōtsubo
The Celestial Maiden of wind. Her name means "quince". She has a friendly personality, but due to this, she often fails at gathering the shards of the Michimi Peach.
Maron (栗)
Voiced by: Rumi Ōkubo
The Celestial Maiden of earth. Her name means "chestnut". The most serious and responsible member of the group. Her weapon is a mallet
Kushinada (クシナダ)
Voiced by: Asami Shimoda
The assistant Sumeragi Tennyō. She is gentle and serious, but also has a fetish for sacrifices. Because of this, she can freeze over the mood of a scene in an instant.
Kaguya (かぐや)
Voiced by: Mikako Komatsu
A mysterious scientist who has her own plans for the fragments of the Michimi Peach.
Abe Seimei
Voiced by: Satoshi Hino
An onmyoji who aids Momoko and her friends, but in secret works for Kaguya. He is based on the historical onmyouji Abe no Seimei.
Tōtetsu (トウテツ)
Voiced by: Emiri Katō
Abe Seimei's mysterious familiar that even he doesn't understand. It is impossible to tell if Tōtetsu is a boy or a girl, but inspires affection from Momoko and the Celestial Maidens.
Onihime (鬼姫)
Voiced by: Minami Tsuda
The princess of the Oni and step daughter of Jyako. She's a girl who is curious about the world, and also hates to lose. In addition, she hates anything that has twisted logic. She becomes Momoko's rival nearly immediately. She discovers that Momoko is her twin sister.
Jakiō (邪鬼王)
Voiced by: Banjou Ginga
The King of the Onis and Onihime's step father. He has plans to collect the many fragments of the peach and use it to restore his clan to power.
Tekki (鉄鬼)
Voiced by: Hisao Egawa
One of the Four Oni Generals and the first one to appear. He only obeys those who are stronger than him. He fights with an iron rod.
Enki (艶鬼)
Voiced by: Chiaki Takahashi
One of the Four Oni Generals and the only female among them. She acts as an older sister for Onihime. Her weapon is a whip.
Genki (幻鬼)
Voiced by: Hisayoshi Suganuma
One of the Four Oni Generals, the youngest and the weakest. Enki and Onihime often bully him. His weapon is a pipe that can make illusions.
Yōki (妖鬼)
Voiced by: Chō
One of the Four Oni Generals. He never fights fair and seems to have plans of his own for the Michimi Peach. He enjoys improvised tactics like disguising himself and tricking enemies into fighting each other.

== Media ==
=== Anime ===
An anime television series adaptation by Tri-Slash and Project No.9 aired in July 2014. The opening theme is "Pink Fantasy" by Haruka Chisuga.

==== Episode list ====
No.	Title	Original release date
1	"Possession Fusion! Momo Kyun Sword!!" "Hyōigattai! Momo Kyun Sōdo!!" (憑依合体! モモキュンソード!!)	July 8, 2014
2	"Loving Relationship, Demonic Relationship, Oni-hime Pays a Visit" "Aien Oni En!? Kiki Sanjō!" (合縁鬼縁!? 鬼姫参上!)	July 15, 2014
3	"One for All and All for One: The Celestial Maiden Squad!?" "Isshindotai Tennyo-tai!?" (一心同体 天女隊!?)	July 22, 2014
4	"Mad Dance of the Giant Boobs!? The Pine Forest of Miho" "Yukata Chichi Ranbu! Miho no Matsubara" (豊乳乱舞!? 三保の松原!)	July 29, 2014
5	"Suspicion!? The Trap in the Fog" "Gishinnagi!? Kiri ni Hisomu Wana" (疑心暗鬼!? 霧に潜む罠)	August 5, 2014
6	"A Star is Born! We're the Celestial Maiden Squad!" "Utahime Bakutan! Tennuo-tai de Byu〜!" (歌姫爆誕! 天女隊でびゅ〜!)	August 12, 2014
7	"Lost!? Momoko's Important Thing" "Sōshitsu Kiki!? Momoko no Taisetsuna Mono"&nbp;(喪失危機!? 桃子の大切なモノ)	August 19, 2014
8	"Peach Plan The Underwear that Disappeared into the Steam!?" "Moimiro Kikaku♡Yukemuri ni Kieta Shitagi!?" (桃色企画♡湯煙に消えた下着!?)	August 26, 2014
9	"A Huge Plot Twist!? Momo's Secret!" "Chō Kyū Tenkai!? Momo no Himitsu!" (超急展開!? モモの秘密!)	September 2, 2014
Onihime discovers a shocking secret about her past. She denies that that could be true and confronts her father about it.
10	"Shocking! Onigashima's Counter-attack!!" "Kyōtendōchi! Gyakushū no Onigashima!!" (驚天動地! 逆襲の鬼ヶ島!!)	September 9, 2014
11	"The Last Battle! Momoko vs Jakiou!!" "Saishū Kessen! Momoko Tai Jagi-Ō!!" (最終決戦! 桃子対邪鬼王!!)	September 16, 2014
12	"Peach Fantasy! Momo Kyun Sword" "Momoiro Gensō! Momo Kyun Sōdo♡"&nbp;(桃色幻想! モモキュンソード♡)	September 23, 2014

== Reception ==
Gregory Smith of The Fandom Post described it an ecchi series with action scenes that constantly called attention its lack of cohesion.
