= Miru: Paths to My Future =

Japanese anime television series

- Key visual

未ル わたしのみらい (Miru: Watashi no Mirai)
- Created by: Yanmar Holdings
- Anime television series
- Directed by: Norio Kashima (1); Okamoto (2); Tomohiro Kawamura (3); Naofumi Mishina (4); Saori Nakashiki (5)
- Written by: Shigeru Morita
- Studio: LinQ (1); TriF Studio (2); Scooter Films (3); Shirogumi (3); Reirs (4); Larx Entertainment (5); Studio Hibari (5)
- Licensed by: Remow
- Original network: MBS, Tokyo MX
- Original run: April 2, 2025 – May 1, 2025
- Episodes: 5

Miru: Paths to My Future (未ル わたしのみらい, Miru: Watashi no Mirai) is a Japanese original anime television series created by Yanmar Holdings. The series is written by Shigeru Morita from Studio Nue. The five-episode omnibus series aired from April 2 to May 1, 2025, on MBS and Tokyo MX. The opening theme song is "AI=UTA" performed by V.W.P, while the ending theme song is "Find A Way" performed by Miyavi. The series featured five shorts with different staff members and studios. Remow licensed the series in North America for streaming on its "It's Anime" channel via Samsung TV Plus and YouTube and in Latin America via Anime Onegai. It was then released on Crunchyroll on September 24, 2025.

== Characters ==
=== Episode 079: "Stardust Memory" ===
Yoshimura
Voiced by: Koichi Yamadera
Umi Nagahama
Voiced by: Saori Hayami
SDK/Kanon
Voiced by: Mariya Ise
Sanders
Voiced by: Yoshitsugu Matsuoka
Jackson
Voiced by: Tsuyoshi Koyama
Mr. Onion
Voiced by: Kenichi Ogata
Narrator
Voiced by: Mari Yokoo

=== Episode 101: "The King of the Forest" ===
Mario vasco Debritto
Voiced by: Tomohiro Ōno, Anna Nagase (young)
Mario's grandfather
Voiced by: Junpei Morita
Mario's father
Voiced by: Yasuyuki Kase
Clara
Voiced by: Honoka Kuroki
???
Voiced by: Makoto Furukawa

=== Episode 217: "Londonderry Air" ===
Ame
Voiced by: Chika Anzai
Miru
Voiced by: Yoshimasa Hosoya
Big Sis
Voiced by: Ami Koshimizu
Professor
Voiced by: Daisuke Hirakawa

=== Episode 630: "Re: MIRU" ===
Toshi/Drunk Man
Voiced by: Daisuke Hirakawa
Miho
Voiced by: Nao Tōyama
Adam
Voiced by: Risae Matsuda
Sato
Voiced by: Takuma Suzuki

=== Episode 926: "Wait, I'll Be There" ===
Airu
Voiced by: Natsu Yorita
Izumif
Voiced by: Romi Park
Pochimaru
Voiced by: Aimi Tanaka
Dr. Aira
Voiced by: Yūko Kaida
