= Jorōgumo =

Mythical creature in Japanese folklore

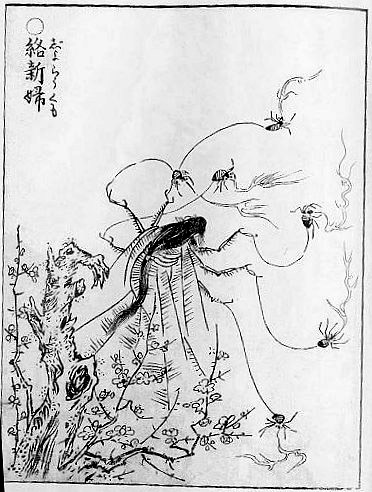
Jorōgumo from the Gazu Hyakki Yagyō by Toriyama Sekien.

Jorōgumo (Japanese: 絡新婦 (kanji), じょろうぐも (hiragana)) is a type of yōkai, a creature of Japanese folklore. It can shapeshift into a beautiful woman, so the kanji that represent its actual meaning are 女郎蜘蛛 (lit. 'woman-spider'); the kanji which are used to write it instead, 絡新婦 (lit. 'entangling newlywed woman') have a jukujikun pronunciation that is related to the meaning, but not the sound of the word. In Toriyama Sekien's Gazu Hyakki Yagyō, it is depicted as a spider woman manipulating small fire-breathing spiders.

Jorōgumo can also refer to some species of spiders, such as the Nephila and Argiope spiders. Japanese-speaking entomologists use the katakana form of jorōgumo (ジョロウグモ) to refer exclusively to the spider species Trichonephila clavata, and this has been adopted into English as "Joro spider".

== Stories ==
In Edo period writings such as the Taihei-Hyakumonogatari (太平百物語) and the Tonoigusa (宿直草), there are "jorogumo" that shapeshift into women.

=== Tonoigusa ===
"Things That Ought to be Pondered, Even in Urgent Times" ("Kifunaru Toki mo, Shian Aru Beki Koto", 急なるときも、思案あるべき事) relates the story of a young woman appearing to be about 19 or 20 years old who appears to a youthful warrior (bushi). She tells the child she carries "That there surely is your father. Go forth, and be embraced" ("arenaru wa tete ni temashimasu zo. Yukite idakare yo", あれなるは父にてましますぞ。行きて抱かれよ). The warrior sees through her ploy and, realizing she is a yōkai, strikes her with his sword, making her flee to the attic. The next day, they find a dead jorōgumo one or two shaku long in the attic, along with numerous bodies of people that the jorōgumo had devoured.

=== Taihei Hyakumonogatari ===
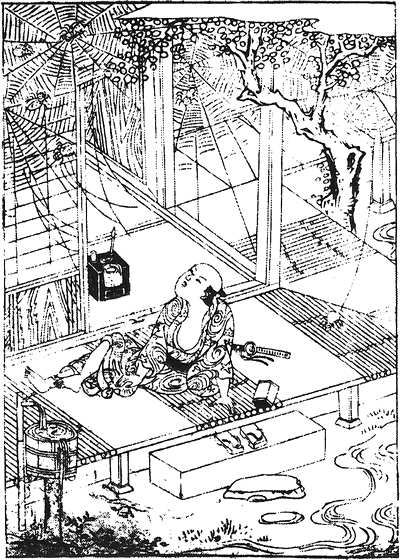
"Magoroku Jorōgumo ni Taburakasareshi Koto" (孫六女郎蜘にたぶらかされし事) from the Taihei Hyakumonogatari

"How Magoroku Was Deceived by a Jorōgumo" ("Magoroku Jorōgumo ni Taburakasareshi Koto",孫六女郎蜘にたぶらかされし事) relates the story of Magoroku dozing in his veranda in Takada, Sakushu (now Okayama Prefecture). As he was about to doze off, a woman in her 50s appeared. She said that her daughter had taken a fancy to Magoroku and invited him to her estate. There, a 16- or 17-year-old girl asked him to marry her. Already married, he declined, but the girl persisted. She claimed that he had almost killed her mother two days before, and yet she still visited him, and surely he could not let her feelings come to nothing. Bewildered, Magoroku fled. The house disappeared as he ran and he found himself back on his own porch. Magoroku's wife then assured him that he had been sleeping on the veranda the whole time. Concluding it was only a dream, Magoroku looked around and noticed a small joro spider that had made a tight web around the eaves. Relieved, he recalled how he drove away a spider two days before.

== Legends by area ==
=== The Jōren Falls of Izu ===
At the Jōren Falls of Izu, Shizuoka Prefecture, allegedly lives the jorōgumo mistress of the waterfall. The local legend tells of a man who rested beside the waterfall basin when the jorōgumo tried to drag him into the waterfall by throwing webs around his leg. The man transferred the webbing around a tree stump, which was dragged into the falls instead of him.

After that, people of the village dared not venture close to the falls anymore. Then one day, a visiting woodcutter who was a stranger to this all tried to cut a tree and mistakenly dropped his favorite axe into the basin. As he tried to go down to fetch his axe back, a beautiful woman appeared and returned it to him. "You must never tell anyone what you saw here", she said. Initially he kept the secret, but as days went by, the need to spill the story burdened him. And finally at a banquet, while drunk, he told the whole story. Feeling unburdened and at peace, he went to sleep, but he never woke again. In another version, the woodcutter was pulled outside by an invisible string and his corpse was found floating the next day at the Jōren Falls.

In yet another version, the woodcutter fell in love with a woman he met at the waterfall. He visited her every day, but grew physically weaker each time. The oshō of a nearby temple suspected that the woodcutter was "taken in by the jorōgumo mistress of the waterfall", and accompanied him to chant a sutra. When a spider thread reached out to the woodcutter, the oshō let out a thunderous yell, and the thread disappeared. Now knowing that the woman was actually a jorōgumo, the woodcutter still persisted and tried to gain permission for marriage from the mountain's tengu. When the tengu denied him the woodcutter ran towards the waterfall, where he was entangled by spider threads and disappeared into the water.

=== Kashikobuchi, Sendai ===
Various areas have a legend about people being dragged into a waterfall by a jorōgumo as well as the use of a tree stump as decoy. In the legend of Kashikobuchi, Sendai, a voice was heard saying, "clever, clever", ("kashikoi, kashikoi"), after the tree stump was pulled into the water. The legend is thought to be the origin of the name Kashikobuchi or "clever abyss". The jorōgumo of Kashikobuchi was worshipped for warding off water disasters, and even now there are monuments and torii that are engraved with "Myōhō Kumo no Rei" (妙法蜘蛛之霊).

Once, an eel that lived in the abyss visited the man Genbe and shapeshifted into a beautiful woman. She warned him that the jorōgumo of the abyss was going to attack her the next day. The woman claimed she could never match the jorōgumo in power and she desired help from Genbe. Genbe promised to help her, but the next day he got scared and shut himself in his house. The eel lost her fight with the jorōgumo, and Genbe died of insanity.

== In fiction ==
The main villain in Darkness Unmasked by Keri Arthur is a Jorōgumo in Melbourne. She kills female musicians, takes on their likeness, and performs in clubs to feast and mate with unsuspecting males. The dead musicians act as food for her children.

A very young Jorōgumo child is the focus of a one-episode OVA made in 2012 by Toshihisa Kaiya and Daishirou Tanimura, titled Wasurenagumo (Li'l Spider-Girl). Many years ago, she was sealed away in the book by her own caretaker – the priest who defeated her monstrous mother but had no heart to kill the yōkai child. In the modern day, Li'l Spider-Girl is accidentally released from the book by a young girl named Mizuki, and then is taken in by the current owner of the book – Suzuri. Later on, Mizuki and Suzuri embark on a short adventure to help their new yōkai charge in finding her mom.

In the novel Magic for Nothing by Seanan McGuire (book 6 in the InCryptid series), a Jorōgumo disguised as a human performer is traveling with a carnival, feeding on locals. The protagonist Antimony Price is sent to investigate the deaths.

In Demon Slayer, Spider Demon (Mother) (蜘蛛鬼「母」, Kumo Oni (Haha)) has the design of a woman with a short, curvaceous physique and voluptuous figure, and the ability to control her victims using her threads, which are attached by small white and red spiders, pulling inspiration from the Jorōgumo.

In One Piece, Black Maria, a member of the Beast Pirates, has eaten the Spider-Spider Fruit: Rosamygale Grauvogeli Model and modified it for only her lower half to change into a large spider. She is also a courtesan and musician who keeps many men captive.

In two books of "The Hellequin Chronicles", by Steve McHugh, Jorōgumo are mentioned. In the novella "Infamous Reign" Nate fights two daughters and a mother, supposedly killing all three, although the mother's death isn't confirmed. In "Lies Ripped Open" he encounters the mother again and kills her definitively that time. Jorōgumo venom is potent and can take several weeks for someone to heal, which requires constant magic use.

In Monster Hunter Rise, the monster Rakna Kadaki is a giant fire-breathing spider based on the Jorogumo. It fights alongside its larvae.

In Yo-kai Watch Shadowside series, Lady Arachnia is one of the primary villains. In the story, she takes a skyscraper hostage, draining all of the occupants' souls and leaving them as withered husks of themselves.

In Rise of the Teenage Mutant Ninja Turtles one of the main villains is Big Mama. She first appears as a beautiful woman, but is then revealed as a yōkai, with her real form being a huge spider. She repeatedly tricks and manipulates the male protagonists.

In Digimon Story: Cyber Sleuth The story mission "Living Doll, Dead Person" centers around people being turned into ultra-realistic dolls manufactured by Jorōgumo Co.

Alma Katsu’s 2022 novel, “The Fervor”, takes place partly in a Japanese Internment Camp in Idaho where a mysterious illness is befalling prisoners. A mysterious ghostly woman haunting the neighboring area is in fact a Jorōgumo.

In the crime mystery anime Case Closed and its manga, there is a three-part episode, "Tottori Spider Mansion Demon" (episodes 166-168) which depicts a series of supposed suicides by hanging. The incidents may be linked to the curse caused by a Jorōgumo. When the protagonists go to investigate, a man is brutally murdered, hung, and his corpse entangled in a massive spider's web. The stakes are raised when one of the main characters finds themselves in the spider's web. It's now a race against the clock to stop the madman before another victim is claimed.

== See also ==
- Cultural depictions of spiders
- List of legendary creatures from Japan
- Tsuchigumo, another spider-like yōkai in Japanese folklore
