= Shiori Mikami =

Japanese voice actress

- 三上 枝織
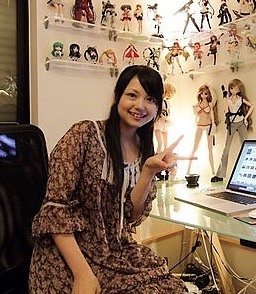
- Mikami in September 2010
- Born: January 6, 1989 (age 37); Aomori Prefecture, Japan
- Education: Tokyo Announcement School
- Occupation: Voice actor
- Years active: 2008–present
- Agent: Aoni Production
- Notable work: Attack on Titan as Krista Lenz; YuruYuri as Akari Akaza; Harem in the Labyrinth of Another World as Roxanne; Big Order as Rin Kurenai; Oresuki as Hina Hanetachi
- Height: 160 cm (5 ft 3 in)

Shiori Mikami (三上 枝織, Mikami Shiori; born January 6, 1989) is a Japanese voice actress from Aomori Prefecture, Japan. She was affiliated with Aoni Production until 2011. She won the Best Rookie Actress at the 6th Seiyu Awards.

== Filmography ==
=== Anime ===
- Shugo Chara! (and Shugo Chara! Doki) (2008), Schoolgirl, Children, Girl
- Skip Beat! (2008), Kazumi, Yumiko, others
- Kämpfer (2009), Masumi Nishino
- Saki (2009), Yōko Kadomatsu
- Net Miracle Shopping (2nd season) (2010), Jelly-chan, others
- Sacred Seven (2011), Shiori
- Sakiika-kun (2011), Kaibashira-chan
- YuruYuri (2011), Akari Akaza
- Haiyore! Nyaruko-san (2012), Ghutatan
- YuruYuri♪♪ (2012), Akari Akaza
- Shining Hearts: Shiawase no Pan (2012), Airy Ardet
- Ixion Saga DT (2012), Ecarlate Juptris Saint Piria
- Attack on Titan (2013-2023), Krista Lenz/Historia Reiss
- Devils and Realist (2013), Lamia
- Problem Children are Coming from Another World, aren't they? (2013), Riri
- Amagi Brilliant Park (2014), Kobory, Ashe
- Momo Kyun Sword (2014), Ringo
- Inari, Konkon, Koi Iroha (2014), Ōmiya-no-Me-no-Kami
- World Trigger (2014), Haruka Ayatsuji, Aoba Harukawa
- Hi sCoool! SeHa Girl (2014), Mega-CD
- Chain Chronicle (2014), Rifrette
- Yuru Yuri Nachuyachumi! (2014), Akari Akaza
- Attack on Titan: Junior High (2015), Krista Lenz
- Yuru Yuri San☆Hai! (2015), Akari Akaza
- Big Order (2016), Rin Kurenai
- Flying Witch (2016), Nao Ishiwatari
- Chain Chronicle ~The Light of Haecceitas~ (2017), Kemamire
- Kemono Friends (2017), Northern White-faced Owl (ep. 7, 9, 12)
- Oresuki (2019), Hina "Asunaro" Hanetachi
- Those Snow White Notes (2021), Mai Tanuma
- Fairy Ranmaru (2021), Jō-о̄
- 180-Byō de Kimi no Mimi o Shiawase ni Dekiru ka? (2021), Akari Sawake
- Akebi's Sailor Uniform (2022), Ayumi Tougeguchi
- Harem in the Labyrinth of Another World (2022), Roxanne
- Sailor Moon Cosmos (2023), Sailor Lethe
- Go! Go! Loser Ranger! (2024), Angel Usukubo
- Grandpa and Grandma Turn Young Again (2024), Mino
- Tasūketsu (2024), Omi Jin
- One Piece (2024), Hibari
- Rock Is a Lady's Modesty (2025), Harumi
- Mebius Dust (2026), Spica
- Tetsuryō! Meet with Tetsudō Musume (2026), Kinu Watarase
- Magical Girl Raising Project: Restart (2026), Melville
- Record of Ragnarok (3rd season), Alvitr

=== Video games ===
- Tales of the World: Radiant Mythology 2 (2009) – Heroes Voice
- Ys Seven (2009; PlayStation Portable) – Aisha
- Ys vs. Sora No Kiseki: Alternative Saga (2010) – Aisha
- Lilpri (2010; Arcade version) – Natsuki Sasahara
- Valkyria Chronicles II (2010; PlayStation Portable)– Colleen Celsius, Jade
- Gods Eater Burst (2011; PlayStation Portable) – Player voice
- Dynasty Warriors 8 (2013; PlayStation 3) – Guan Yinping
- Chain Chronicle (2014; Android Smartphone) – Various Arcana/Characters
- Granblue Fantasy (2014; iOS/Android/web browser) – Melissabelle
- Natsuiro High School: Seishun Hakusho (2015) – Megu Mikazuki
- Dead or Alive Xtreme Venus Vacation (2018) – Luna
- Onsen Musume: Yunohana Collection (2018) – Nodoka Nyuto
- Warriors Orochi 4 (2018-19) – Guan Yinping
- Oninaki (2019) – Linne
- Lilycle Rainbow Stage!!! (2019) – Hina Wakamiya
- Pokémon Masters (2019) – Acerola
- Blue Archive (2021) – Konuri Maki
- Mahjong Soul (2023) – Hannah

== Discography ==
=== Collaborations ===
- "Akazukin-chan Goyōjin" (Otogi8) (2010) – Ōkami-san anime ending theme
- "The Great YuriYurarararaYuruYuri Incident" (Nanamori Middle School Amusement Club) (2011) – YuruYuri anime opening theme
- "Let's Go at My Pace" (Nanamori Middle School Amusement Club) (2011) – YuruYuri anime closing theme
- "電波ソング通信部 電撃作戦トルネイド" (2012)

=== Character singles ===
- Song series ♪ 01 of Yuruyuri (2011)

=== Drama CDs ===
- Night Wizard 2nd edition Broom Maiden – Mai Yahagi
- Shimekirisama ni Oyurushi wo – Tamapen no seirei, Nikkō-chan
- Ys VII Prologue – Terra
- Tate no Yuusha no nariagari – Atla
