= List of Oresuki characters =

This is a list of characters from the light novel Oresuki, which revolves around Amatsuyu "Joro" Kisaragi, an ordinary high school student who is invited out alone by two beautiful girls: the upperclassman Sakura "Cosmos" Akino and his childhood friend Aoi "Himawari" Hinata. Expecting to hear their confessions, he triumphantly goes to meet each of them in turn. However, both Cosmos and Himawari confess to Joro that they like his best friend, Taiyо̄ "Sun-chan" Ōga, instead of him. He reluctantly agrees to help both girls pursue Sun-chan on the hope of dating the loser, only to suddenly be confessed to by the unremarkable bookworm Sumireko "Pansy" Sanshokuin, who is the girl Sun-chan is in love with.

== Characters ==
=== Main characters ===
Amatsuyu "Joro" Kisaragi (如月 雨露, Kisaragi Amatsuyu)
Voiced by: Daiki Yamashita
Amatsuyu, nicknamed "Joro" (如雨露, Jōro; lit. "Watering Can"), is a second-year student at Nishikizuta High School who is best friends with Sun-chan, the likable ace of their local baseball team and childhood friends with Himawari, who follows him everywhere. One day, Joro is asked out by Cosmos, the Student Council President, and Himawari for two consecutive dates over the weekend. At the end of these dates, both girls confess that they're in love with Sun-chan, at which point Joro reveals that he purposefully cultivated the "friendly, obtuse boy" personality to lure both girls into liking him and that the true personality he keeps hidden is much more harsh and aggressive. He reluctantly agrees to help both girls pursue Sun-chan in the hope of dating the loser, only to suddenly be confessed to by the unremarkable bookworm Pansy, who reveals that she knows all of Joro's secrets and fell in love with his true personality.
Sumireko "Pansy" Sanshokuin (三色院 菫子, Sanshokuin Sumireko)
Voiced by: Haruka Tomatsu
Sumireko, nicknamed "Pansy" (三色菫, Panjī), is a second-year student and library helper at Nishikizuta High School. Pansy looks like an unattractive gloomy bookworm with long black hair tied in braids, thick glasses and a sharp tongue towards Joro. In truth, she has stalked him and learned all his secrets and is aware of his dual-faced nature, and blackmails him into coming to spend lunch break time with her at the library. She is in love with Joro, which he doesn't take well. She is very observant of people and could discern Sun-chan's true nature. Beneath her unappealing exterior, she is in fact a gorgeous beauty with a bust size far larger than she typically shows. Following her help, Joro reluctantly decides to visit her regularly at the school library during lunchtimes and after school.
Aoi "Himawari" Hinata (日向 葵, Hinata Aoi)
Voiced by: Haruka Shiraishi
Aoi, nicknamed "Himawari" (向日葵; lit. "Sunflower"), is a second-year student at Nishikizuta High School and Joro's childhood friend. She is in love with Sun-chan, and requests Joro's help to succeed in her romance. Like Sakura, she too begins to realize her feelings for Joro after Sun-chan's true nature is revealed to her. She is an avid tennis player.
Sakura "Cosmos" Akino (秋野 桜, Akino Sakura)
Voiced by: Sachika Misawa
Sakura, nicknamed "Cosmos" (秋桜, Kosumosu), is a third-year student and the Student Council President at Nishikizuta High School; as such, she is very organized and rarely late to any meeting. Cosmos always carries with her a notebook, which she often uses to take notes and make meticulous plans, as she gets nervous whenever faced with a scenario she hasn't planned for. Cosmos is initially in love with Sun-chan, and originally requests Joro's help to succeed in her romance. However, after Sun-chan's manipulations are revealed, she redirects her attention toward Joro, with whom she develops genuine feelings for. She and Pansy form a cordial rivalry, as neither girl intends to lose to the other.
Taiyо̄ "Sun-chan" Ōga (大賀 太陽, Ōga Taiyō)
Voiced by: Yuma Uchida
Taiyо̄, nicknamed "Sun-chan" (サンちゃん, Sanchan), is a second-year student at Nishikizuta High School and Joro's best friend since middle-school. He is the ace of the Baseball Club, who is popular in school due to his friendly and caring demeanor. He is the target of affection of both Himawari and Cosmos, but is in love with Pansy. His warm personality is only a mere facade as Sun-chan is in fact, extremely selfish, prideful and spiteful and has held a grudge towards Joro ever since he learned the girl he liked in middle school liked his friend. Hurt at the prospect of "losing" against Joro, he is well aware of the feelings of Himawari and Cosmos and manipulates them both with uncaring malice in order to destroy Joro's social reputation. He is eventually discovered by Pansy and Joro and is forced to apologize for his actions. Despite his betrayal, Taiyо̄ eventually reconciles with his friends, although he still keeps his feelings for Pansy.

=== Nishikizuta High School ===
Hina "Asunaro" Hanetachi (羽立 桧菜, Hanetachi Hina)
Voiced by: Shiori Mikami
Hina, nicknamed "Asunaro" (翌桧; lit. "Next Cypress"), is a second-year student and member of Newspaper Club at Nishikizuta High School who is in love with Joro. She uses her position in the Club to spread false information, isolate Joro from his friends, steal Sun-chan's spot in the Flower Festival Dance, and set herself up as the only girl he can depend on. After her scheme is exposed by Cosmos, she is harshly rejected by Joro and promises to make amends for her actions.
Chiharu "Tsubaki" Yо̄ki (洋木 茅春, Yōki Chiharu)
Voiced by: Nao Tōyama
Chiharu, nicknamed "Tsubaki" (木春; lit. "Rose of Winter"), is a second-year student who transfers to Joro's class at Nishikizuta High School. She works at her family's restaurant and sold food at a stall during the baseball game. She fell in love with Joro when he bought her food and shared it with Sun-chan to cheer him up after the game. After introducing herself and meeting his friends, she extends an invitation to Joro to work at her family restaurant.
Asaka "Sasanqua" Mayama (真山 亜茶花, Mayama Asaka)
Voiced by: Shuka Saitō
Asaka, nicknamed as both "Sasanqua" (山茶花, Sazanka) and "Charisma Group Child A" (カリスマ群A子, Karisumagun eiko), is a second-year student at Nishikizuta High School who was a part of a group of girls that harasses Joro during the first two arcs. After meeting Joro at the pool and making amends for her actions, she fell in love with him and changed her appearance from a pink, twin-tailed gyaru, to a long, black-haired demure look because Joro said that was his preference.
Chifuyu "Hiiragi" Motoki (元木 智冬, Motoki Chifuyu)
Chifuyu, nicknamed "Hiiragi" (柊, lit. "Holly") is Tsubaki's childhood friend, who transfers to Nishikizuta High School. Her family runs a fried chicken skewer restaurant, which rivals with Tsubaki's family's. She seems to have some strange connection with Tsubaki, and ends up co-incidentally following Tsubaki every time she moves, ending up in Nishikizuta High School, where the two of them have a competition see which one can sell the most skewers during the sports festival.

==== Nishikizuta Baseball Club ====
Kimie "Tampopo" Kamata (蒲田 公英, Kamata Kimie)
Voiced by: Iori Saeki
Kimie, nicknamed "Tampopo" (蒲公英, Tanpopo; lit. "Dandelion"), is a first-year student and manager of the Baseball Club at Nishikizuta High School, who was nominated for the Kabuten dance for the Hundred Flower Festival (百花祭, Hyakkasai).
Ichika "Anemone" Botan (牡丹 一華, Botan Ichika)
Ichika, nicknamed "Anemone" (アネモネ), is a high school student who becomes temporary manager of the Baseball Club at Nishikizuta High School.
Kaito Kutsuki (屈木海 土, Kutsuki Kaito)
Kaito is a student and both the captain and right fielder of the Baseball Club at Nishikizuta High School.
Yōichi Shiguchi (樋口 葉一, Higuchi Yōichi)
Yōichi is a student and batter of the Baseball Club at Nishikizuta High School.
Yuma Anae (穴江 遊馬, Anae Yuma)
Yuma is a student and center fielder of the Baseball Club at Nishikizuta High School.
Tatsuo Shiba (芝 達生, Shiba Tatsuo)
Voiced by: Ryōta Ōsaka
Tatsuo is a student and catcher of the Baseball Club at Nishikizuta High School. He was nicknamed "Shiba-nyan" by Anemone.

==== Nishikizuta Softball Club ====
Nadeshiko "Nadeshiko" Akai (赤井 撫子, Akai Nadeshiko)
Nadeshiko, nicknamed "Nadeshiko" (撫子), is a student and member of the Softball Club at Nishikizuta High School. Although she is so far the only character who is called by her real name, "Nadeshiko" is still considered a nickname, since it is based on the Japanese term "Yamato nadeshiko", which is associated with Dianthus superbus, a flowering plant native to Japan.
Sakura "Primula" Saotome (早乙女 桜, Saotome Sakura)
Sakura, nicknamed "Primula" (プリムラ, Purimura), is a student and member of the Softball Club at Nishikizuta High School.

=== Toshōbu High School ===
Momo "Cherry" Sakurabara (桜原 桃, Sakurabara Momo)
Voiced by: Risa Taneda
Momo, nicknamed "Cherry" (チェリー, Cherī), is the student council president at Toshōbu High School. She is in love with Hose but suppresses her feelings for him because her best friend, Tsukimi, also likes him. She realizes that love and friendship cannot co-exist so Tsukimi and Cherry choose to preserve their friendship rather than pursue Hose.
Luna "Tsukimi" Kusami (草見 月, Kusami Runa)
Voiced by: Konomi Kohara
Luna, nicknamed "Tsukimi" (つきみ; lit. "Evening Primrose"), is a student at Toshōbu High School and Hose's childhood friend. She is also in love with Hose but realises that since Cherry, her best friend, also like him they would be love rivals. Instead, they both agree to suppress their feelings and prioritise Hose's happiness over their feelings.
Yasuo "Hose" Hazuki (葉月 保雄, Hazuki Yasuo)
Voiced by: Jun Fukuyama
Yasuo, nicknamed "Hose" (ホース, Hōsu), is a student at Toshōbu High School and a former junior high schoolmate of Pansy. After spending time with her throughout middle school, he develops feelings for her. However, Pansy does not reciprocate those feelings because she says Hose doesn't take into account other's people's feelings and that, through his benevolence and kindness, other people are negatively affected such as Tsukimi and Cherry. It is because of him that Joro actually falls in love with Pansy.
Kitakaze "Fu-chan" Tokusho (特正 北風, Tokusho Kitakaze)
Kitakaze, nicknamed "Fu-chan" (風ちゃん, Fuuchan), is a second-year student at Toshōbu High School, who is also Sun-chan's rival.
Akane "Lilith" Rancho (蘭頂 朱, Rancho Akane)
Akane, nicknamed "Lilith" (リリス, Ririsu), is a student at Toshōbu High School who, due to her shyness, covers most of her face with her hair and communicates only by text message on her cellphone. She also believes herself to be Cherry's "best".
Asuka "Mint" Usui (薄井明 日荷, Usui Asuka)
Asuka, nicknamed "Mint" (薄荷; lit. "Peppermint"), is a student at Toshōbu High School who admires Sasanqua.

=== Other characters ===
Keike "Laurier" Kisaragi (如月 桂樹, Kisaragi Keike)
Voiced by: Yukari Tamura
Keike, nicknamed "Laurier" (ローリエ, Rōrie) by Pansy, is Joro's energetic and kind mother.
Marika "Jasmine" Kisaragi (如月 茉莉花, Kisaragi Marika)
Marika, nicknamed "Jasmine" (ジャスミン, Jasumin), is Joro's diligent and charismatic older sister, who returns to live with her family after breaking up with her boyfriend.
Hinoto "Lilac" Kashibana (香紫 花丁, Kashibana Hinoto)
Hinoto, nicknamed "Lilac" (紫丁香花, Rairakku), is a former classmate of Himawari during their elementary school period, who currently lives in Hokkaido.
