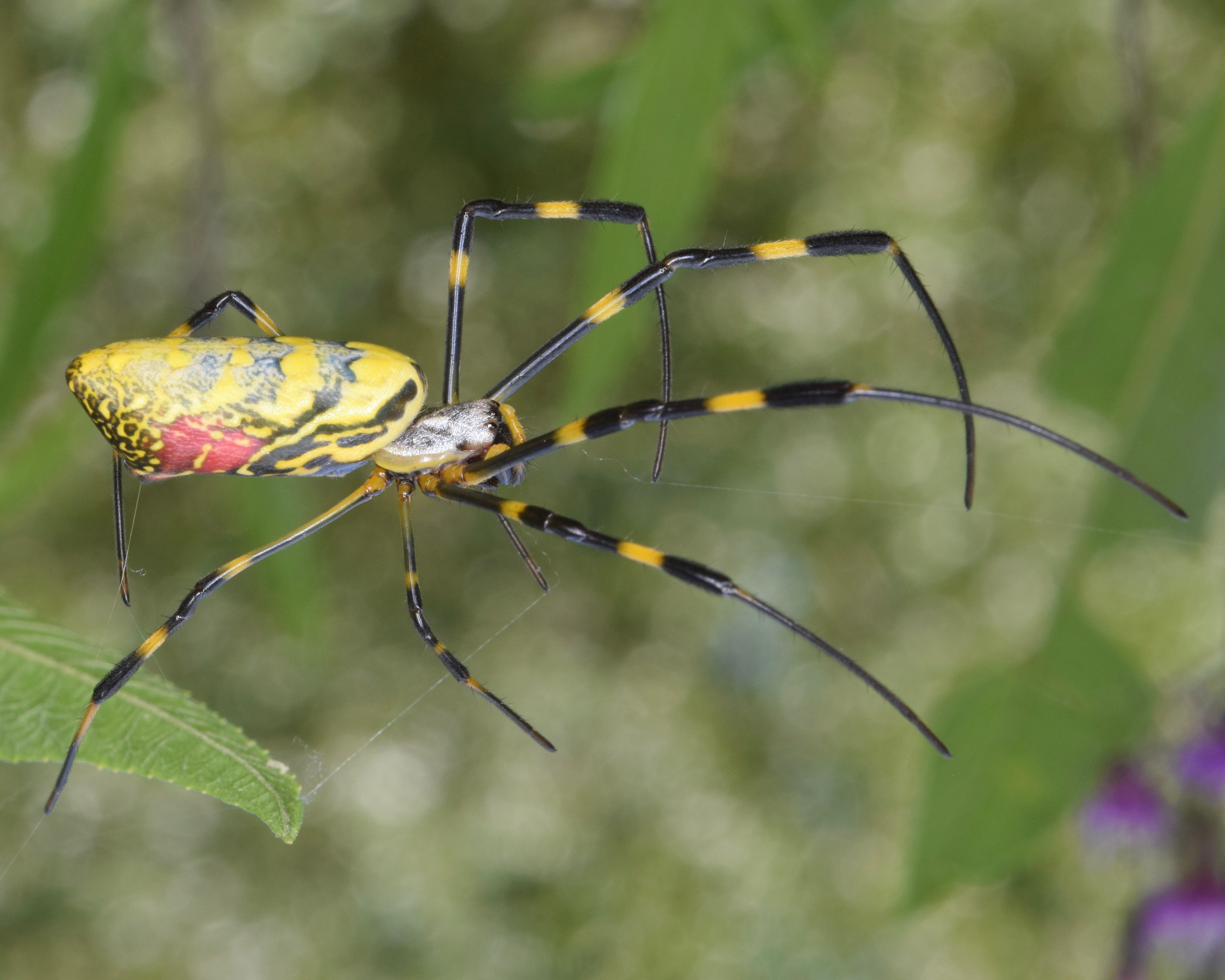
- Female

Conservation status
- Least Concern (IUCN 3.1)

Scientific classification
- Kingdom: Animalia
- Phylum: Arthropoda
- Subphylum: Chelicerata
- Class: Arachnida
- Order: Araneae
- Infraorder: Araneomorphae
- Family: Nephilidae
- Genus: Trichonephila
- Species: T. clavata

Binomial name
- Trichonephila clavata (L. Koch, 1878)

Synonyms
- Nephila clavata L. Koch, 1878; Nephila limbata Thorell, 1898; Nephila obnubila Simon, 1906; Nephila clavatoides Schenkel, 1953; Nephila clavata cavalierei Schenkel, 1963; Argiope maja Bösenberg & Strand, 1906

= Trichonephila clavata =

Species of spider

Trichonephila clavata, also known as the Joro spider (ジョロウグモ, Jorō-gumo), is native to East Asia, including China, Japan (except Hokkaidō), Korea, and Taiwan. The species has been spreading across North America since the 2010s and can now be found across the Eastern United States.

Trichonephila clavata are in the Orbweaver family which are not known to inflict medically significant bites or show signs of aggression.

== Etymology ==
The genus Trichonephila was originally named as a subgenus of Nephila and later promoted to a separate genus. Analysis of Trichonephila can be thought of as tricho- (from Ancient Greek τρῐχός, trikhos; lit. 'hair' or 'hairy') + nephila (lit. 'lover of thread' or 'fond of spinning'). Nephila itself is derived from the words νεῖν (nein, lit. 'to spin') + φίλος (philos, lit. 'love').

The species name, clavata (the feminine form of the Latin adjective clavatus), translates to "club-shaped" or "bearing a club." It derives from the Latin noun clava, meaning "club" or "cudgel." In the case of T. clavata, the German arachnologist Ludwig Carl Christian Koch assigned the species name Nephila clavata in 1878. The name refers to the distinct physical morphology of the spider, specifically the elongated, rounded, club-like shape of the female's abdomen or the swollen, club-shaped palpal bulbs (pedipalps) on mature males.

== Appearance ==
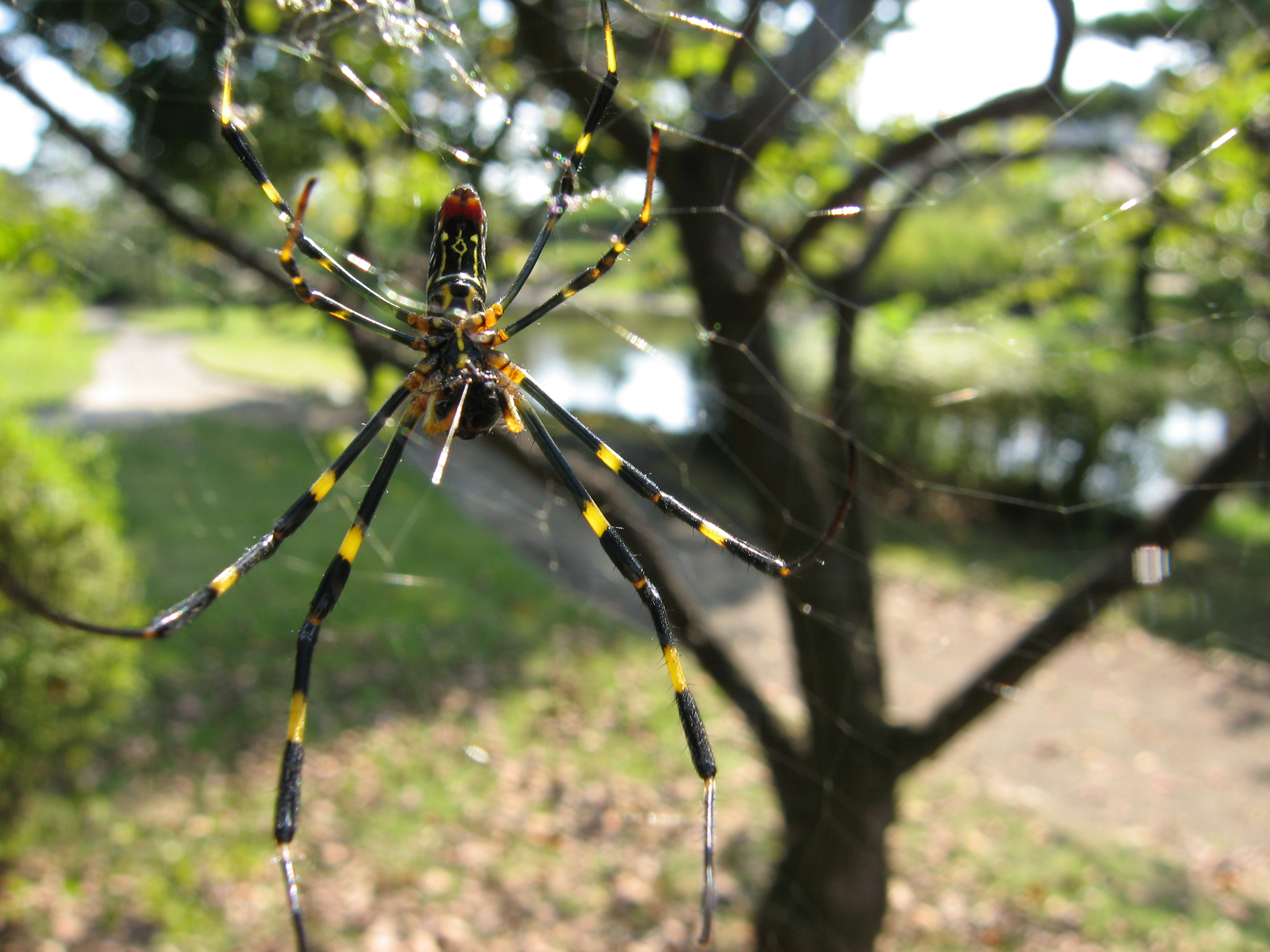
Female seen from below

Joro spiders exhibit extreme sexual dimorphism. The adult female's body size is 17–30 millimeters (0.67–1.2 in) while the male's is 4–8 millimeters (0.16–0.31 in). Both males and females have a large, slender abdomen and long legs.

The adult female has a yellow abdomen with blue or green horizontal stripes and red markings toward the rear of her abdomen. An immature female also has a yellow abdomen but it features a black vertical stripe and black triangular shapes. Both adult and immature females have a silver cephalothorax and slender, black legs with golden yellow bands.

Males are duller in color; their abdomen and cephalothorax are often reddish brown or light brown with a darker stripe running vertically down the abdomen. They have light brown legs with bands of darker brown.

== Life History ==
=== Life Cycle ===
On average, the lifecycle of T. clavata lasts for approximately one year. Clusters of spiderlings overwinter in egg sacs before emerging in the spring. They spend the warmer months feeding and growing until they reach reproductive maturity anywhere from August to October. Beginning in late autumn, males may be seen in the webs of mature females for copulating, which typically occurs directly after the female’s final molt. If multiple males are drawn to the same female, they will often compete for the chance to mate; the largest male will typically be victorious.After mating, the female spins a single egg sac on a tree, laying 400 to 500 eggs in one sac before her lifecycle ends in late autumn or early winter.

=== Web Design ===
The webs of T. clavata females may reach several meters (10 feet) in length. In sunlight, the yellow threads appear to be a rich gold color. There are three layers seen in a cross-section of the web: the central layer is the classic spiral orb web, and there are two irregular layers in front and behind the central orb web. Males rely on females for webs as they do not construct their own.

=== Native Range ===
Joro spiders are native to East Asia. They can be found in the southern regions of India, Nepal, Bhutan, Myanmar, China, Japan, and North Korea, and the northern region of Thailand. They are found throughout the entirety of Bangladesh, Laos, Cambodia, Vietnam, and South Korea.

They live in varying environments like woody areas, natural waterways, urban, and residential areas. They have a large range of temperatures they can tolerate, hence why they can be found throughout the entirety of several Asian countries. Joro spiders are able to live in colder regions compared to other related species, like in areas at or below freezing, because they have metabolism rates reaching twice as high and heart rates that are 77% faster when exposed to the cold. However, they are unable to survive in places like Hokkaido, Japan due to extreme winters.

=== Enemies ===
Enemies of T. clavata in the U.S. are still widely unknown, but there have been observations of a kleptoparasitic theridiid living in their webs. Kleptoparasitic theridiid spiders and ectoparasitic ichneumonoid wasps are enemies in their native range, which are found worldwide. Joro spiders have also been observed in mud dauber wasp nests potentially as prey and it is also likely that birds are possible predators of T. clavata or will be in the future.

== Relationship to Humans and Other Species ==
=== Risks to People ===
The bite of T. clavata does not pose significant risks to humans. Although they can occasionally puncture skin, they are nonaggressive and reluctant to bite. When bites do occur, the venom is weak and not medically significant. The temporary pain and redness has been compared to that of a bee sting. Swelling, itchiness, and redness are the most common side effects; however, they do not tend to last longer than a day.

They were previously in the family Nephilidae which could potentially pose a higher risk of uncharacterized traits. Spiders listed in Nephilidae have been seen feeding on amphibians, small birds and mammals more commonly than previously thought. With the concern of potential harm they could inflict on small invertebrates, monitoring the effects on humans is still recommended.

=== In Folklore ===
The common name of the spider comes from the jorōgumo, a legendary spider in Japanese folklore that can transform into a beautiful woman who can breathe fire and control other spiders. Her name meant "entangling bride" before it was replaced with "whore spider". Once she has reached 400 years of age, she is given the power to feed on human prey in place of insects. She seeks men to seduce, whom she then binds in her silk and devours after luring them into her home. She has the ability to inject venom that slowly weakens her victims, so she can savor them more before their death.

Joro spider moving on a branch in Kanagawa, Japan.

=== Use ===
Trichonephila clavata is a food for the Ao-Nagas.

Joro spiders can be eaten and prepared by removing its legs and frying or sautéing them with onions, garlic, ginger, chilis, and other aromatics. They are also commonly eaten in Nagaland, Northeast India and have a nutty, lightly salty taste.

== Introduced Species in North America ==
=== Distribution ===
The Joro spider is an introduced species in the eastern United States. The most likely cause of their introduction is through shipping containers from China, Japan, or Korea. It is speculated that they naturally disperse through mechanisms such as ballooning, in which they travel via wind for tens of thousands of miles. Due to the female's large size, it is assumed that only males and juvenile females balloon.

Scientists confirmed the first known occurrence of T. clavata in North America in 2014, and as of October 2022, the spider's range spans at least 120,000 km^{2} (46,000 sq mi). They were initially spotted in Madison County, Georgia however established populations now expand into South Carolina, North Carolina, Tennessee, Virginia, Kentucky, and Alabama. Additional sightings have also been reported in Florida, Illinois, Ohio, Maryland, Oklahoma, West Virginia, New Jersey, and Pennsylvania. Researchers speculate they will continue to greatly broaden their range northward due to their cold tolerance.

=== Ecological Impact ===
Small songbirds, like the northern cardinal, have been observed stealing prey items lodged in Joro spider webs. The webs can withstand up to 70g before collapsing, so songbirds are able to perch directly on the web. Researchers have suggested that insects, like predatory fireflies or wasps, can also harvest prey from these webs.

As of 2022, because of the lack of information about T. clavata ecology, the impact it has on its new ecosystem is relatively unknown. One study found that native orb-weaver diets were similar in sites with and without Joro spiders. As generalists, they have been observed eating a range of native and invasive flying insects and possibly don't interfere with the diets of native orb-weavers.

=== Management ===
Researchers ask that people report T. clavata sightings using online crowdsourcing sites such as iNaturalist and EDDMapS so that predictions about their range expansions can be made. Sightings can also be reported to https://jorowatch.org/report/.

It is advised against using pesticides to control Joro spiders as many native species will also be targeted. To remove Joro spiders from a location, they need to be moved far away to another suitable habitat or they must be killed. People in the southeastern United States should also note that there are native orb-weavers that closely resemble the Joro spider, such as Trichonephila clavipes, Argiope aurantia, and Argiope trifasciata.

They are most mistaken for native golden silk orb weavers (Trichonephila clavipes). When comparing females from both species, golden silk orb weavers have rows of silvery white spots on her back while Joro spiders have blue bands. Golden silk orb weavers also have yellow-orange legs with hairy black and brown bands, as opposed to the Joro spider's black legs with golden bands.

== Gallery ==
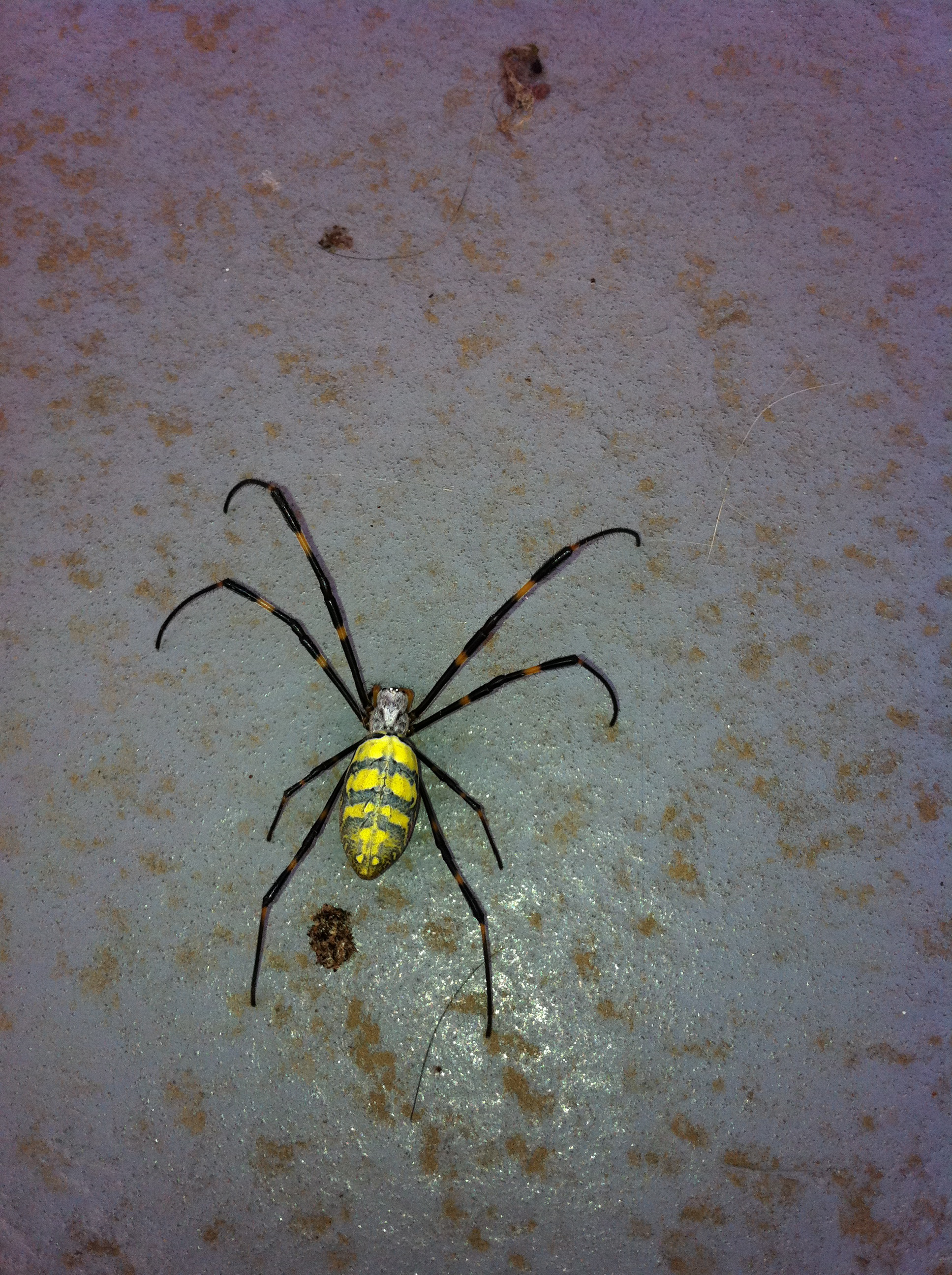
Female spider in Ibaraki, Japan

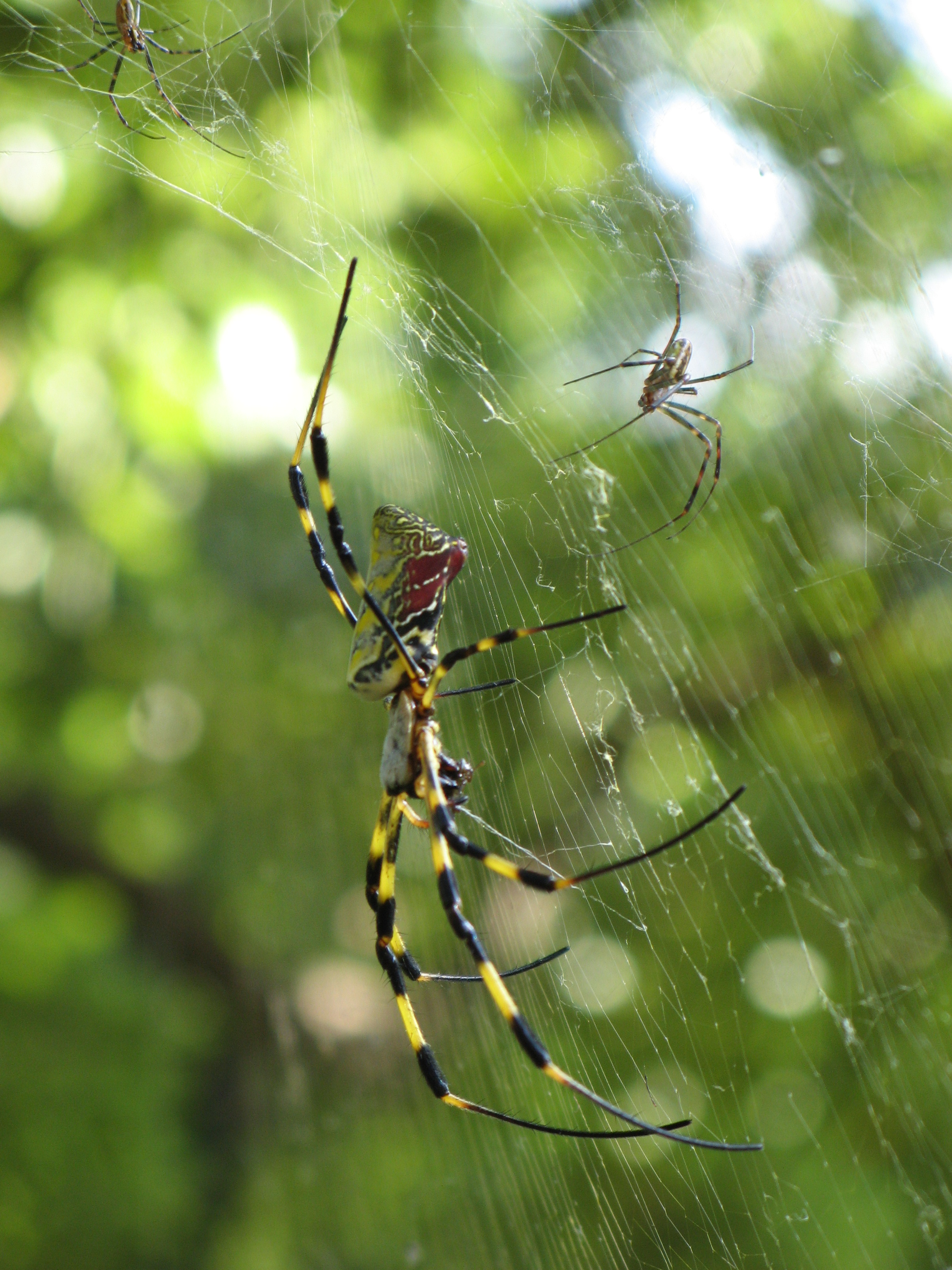
Female spider with two males in Tokyo, Japan

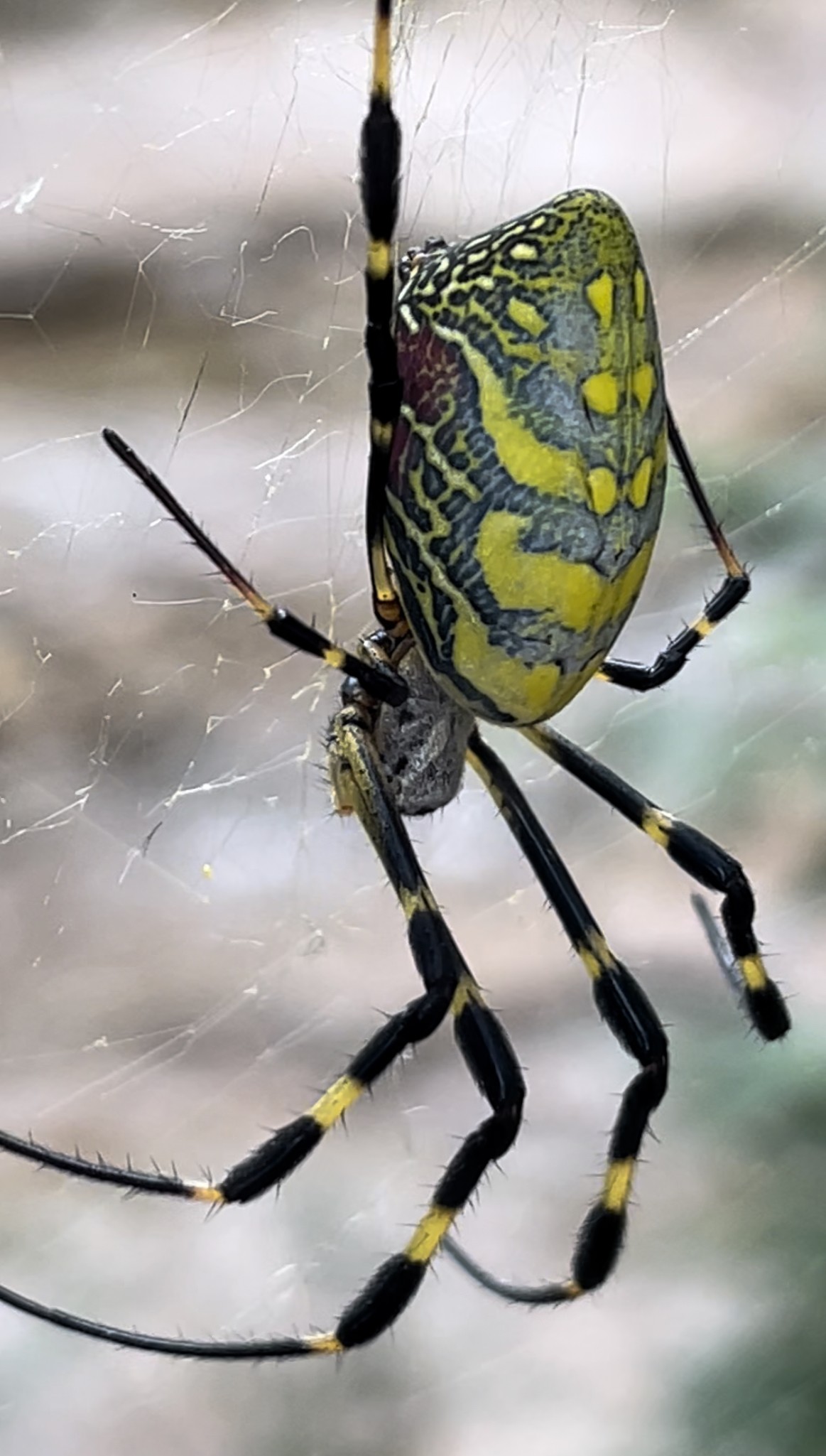
Female spider found in Bukhansan National Park, Seoul, South Korea

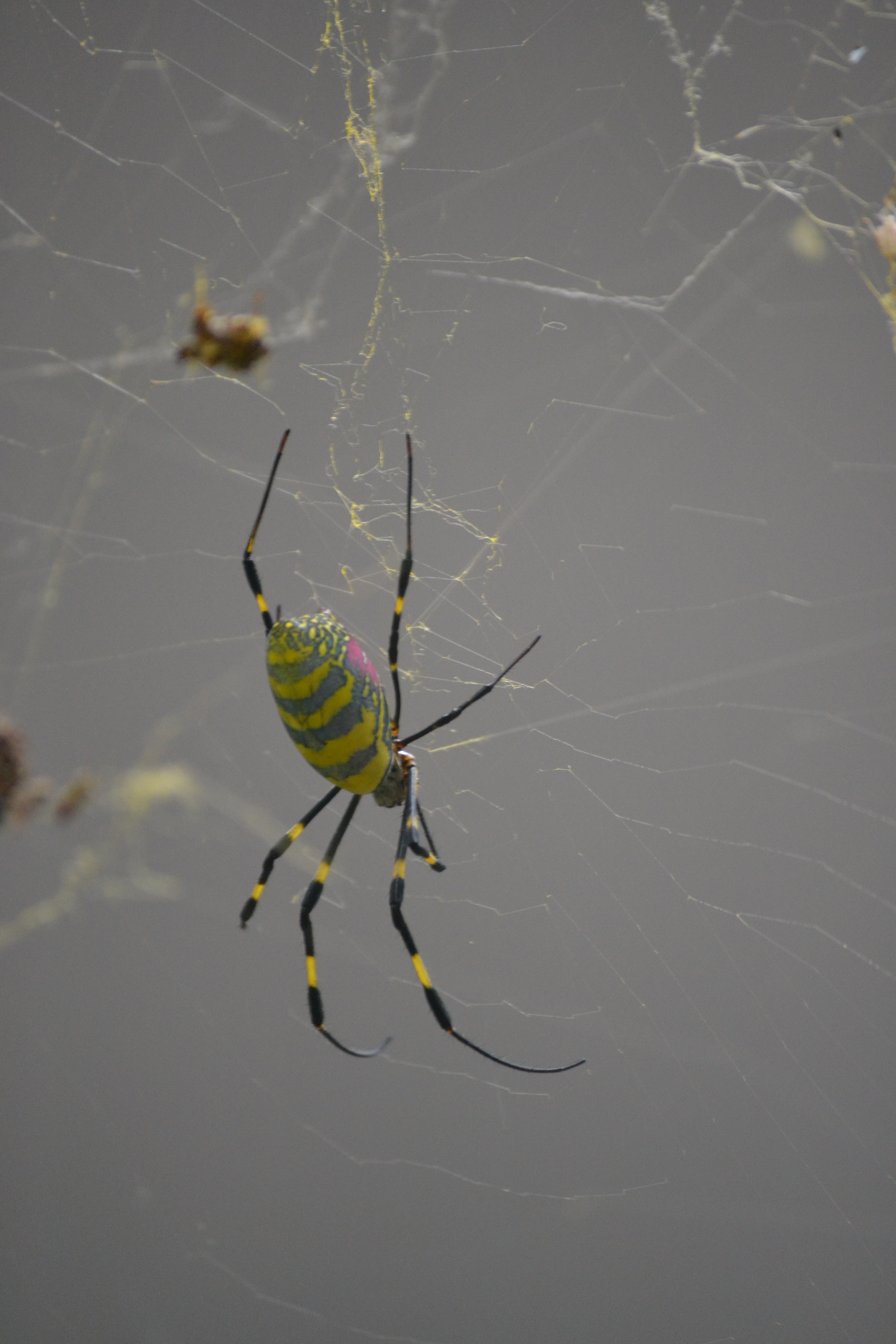
Joro spider found in Oconee County, South Carolina, US, in October 2023

Female spider in Shiga Prefecture, Japan
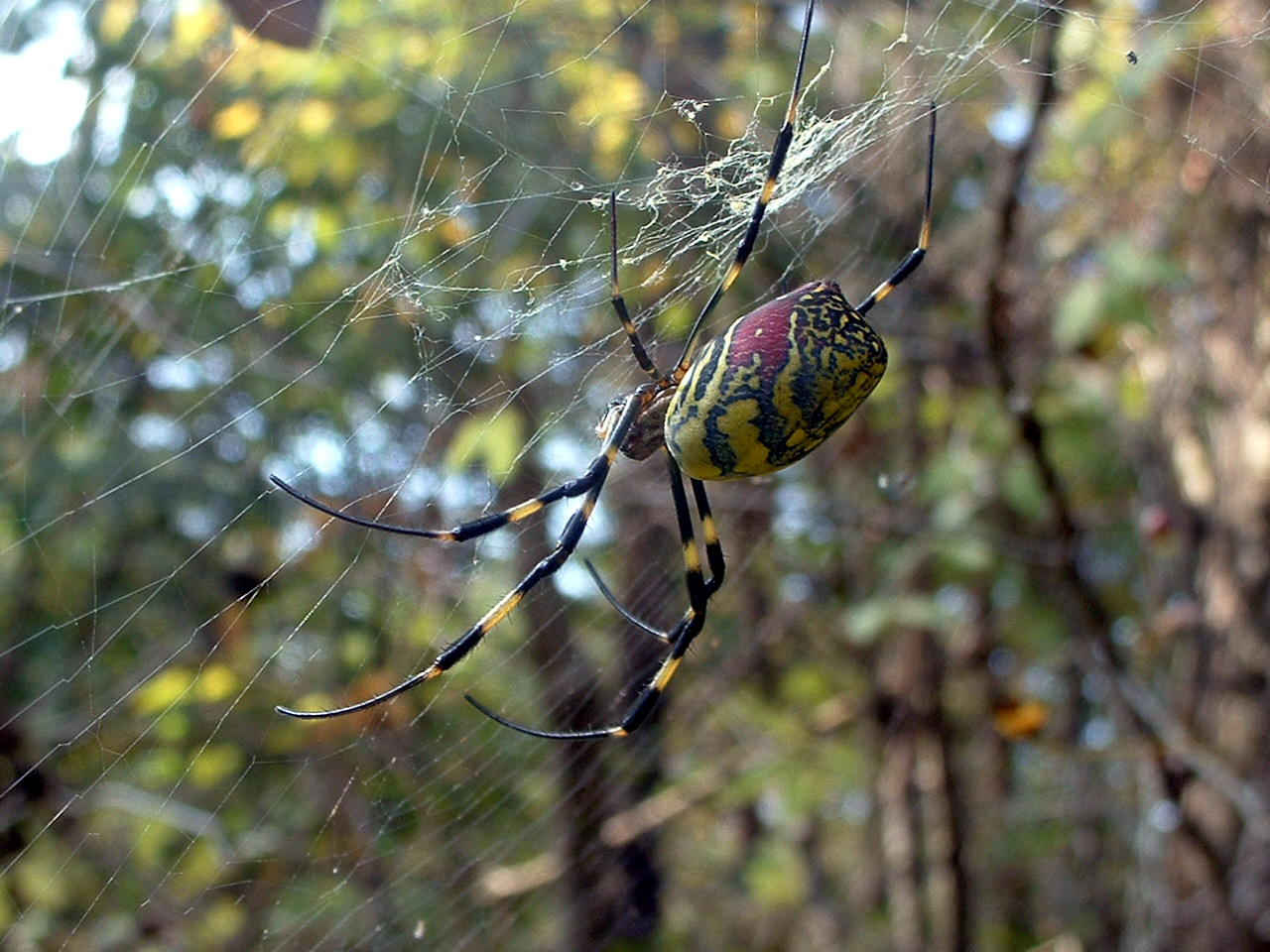
Female at a military base in Aibano, Japan

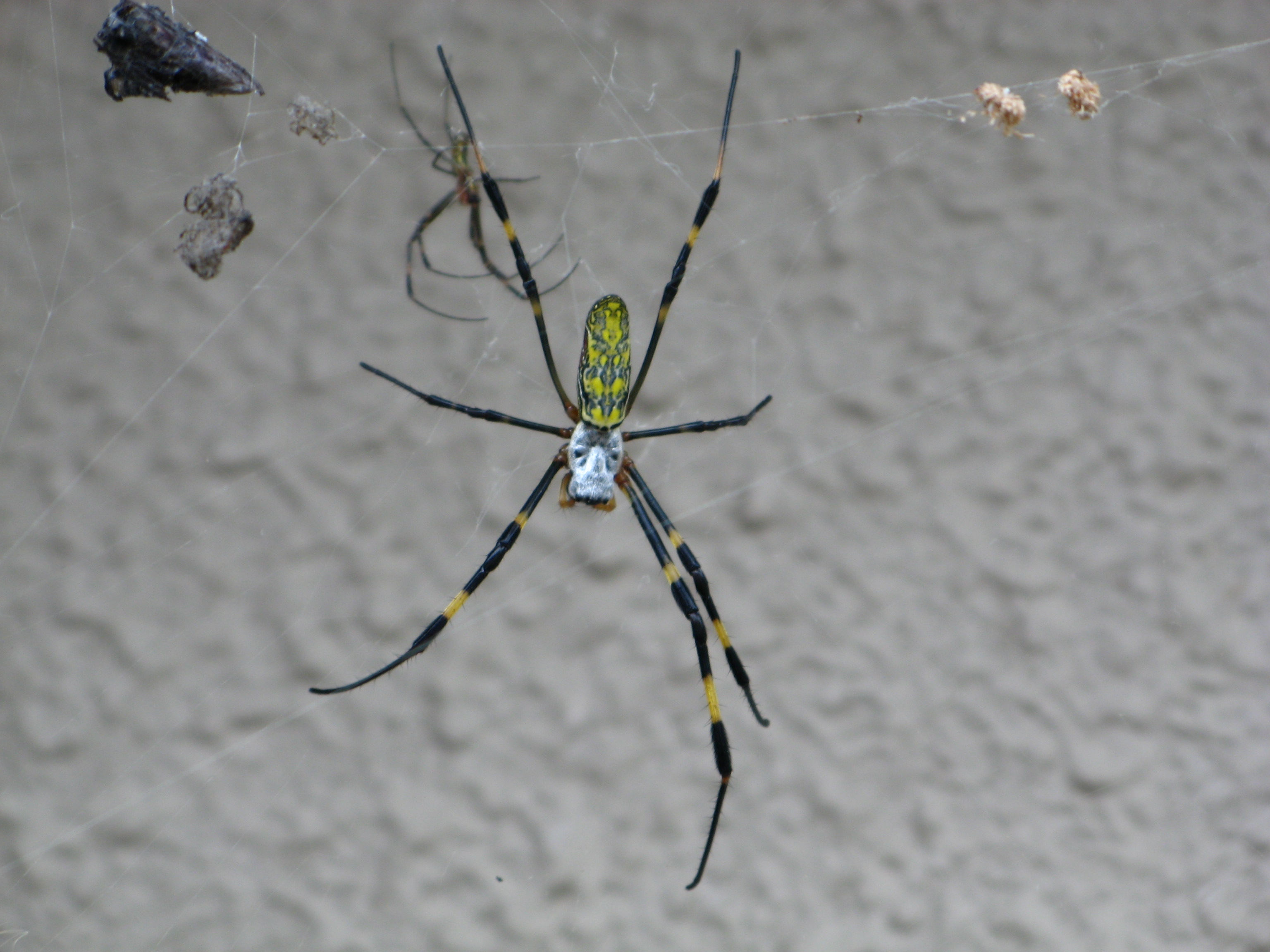
Female with a male in the background on Enoshima, Japan

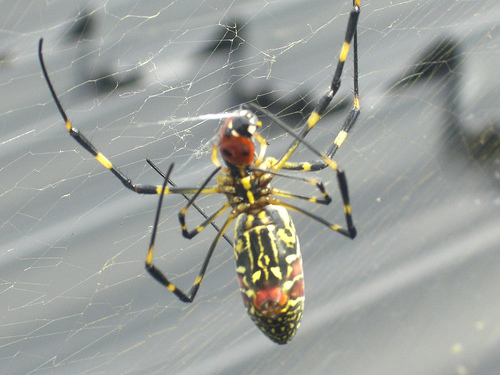
Female eating a ladybug in South Korea

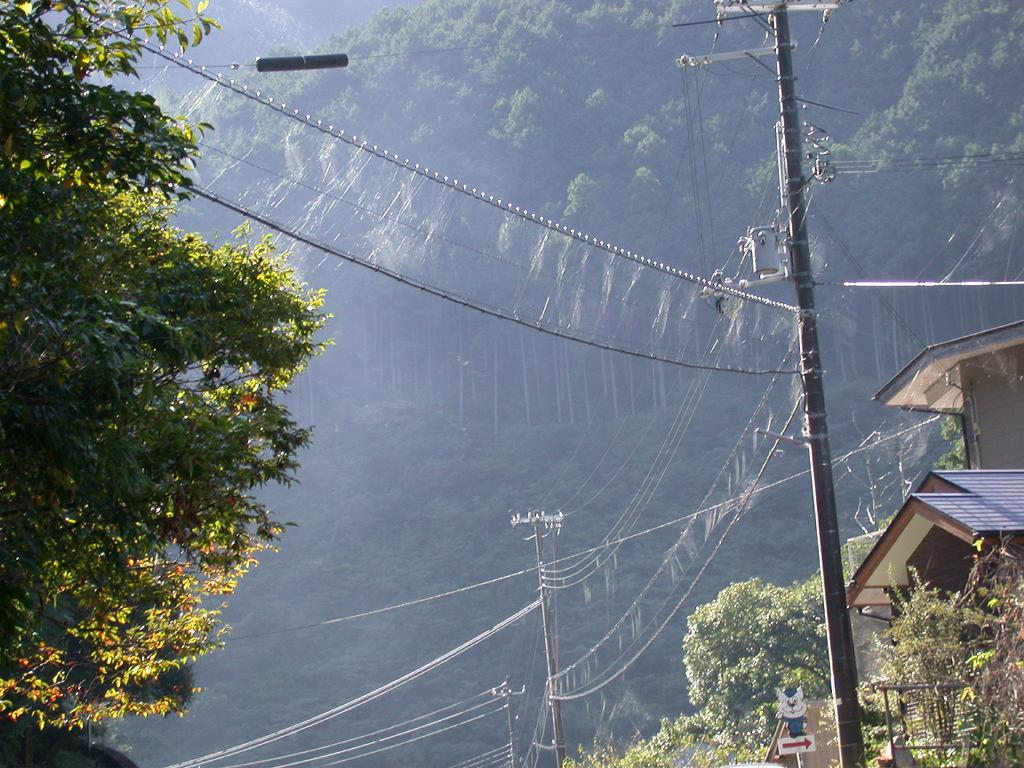
Web on electric power cable in Tanabe, Wakayama, Japan

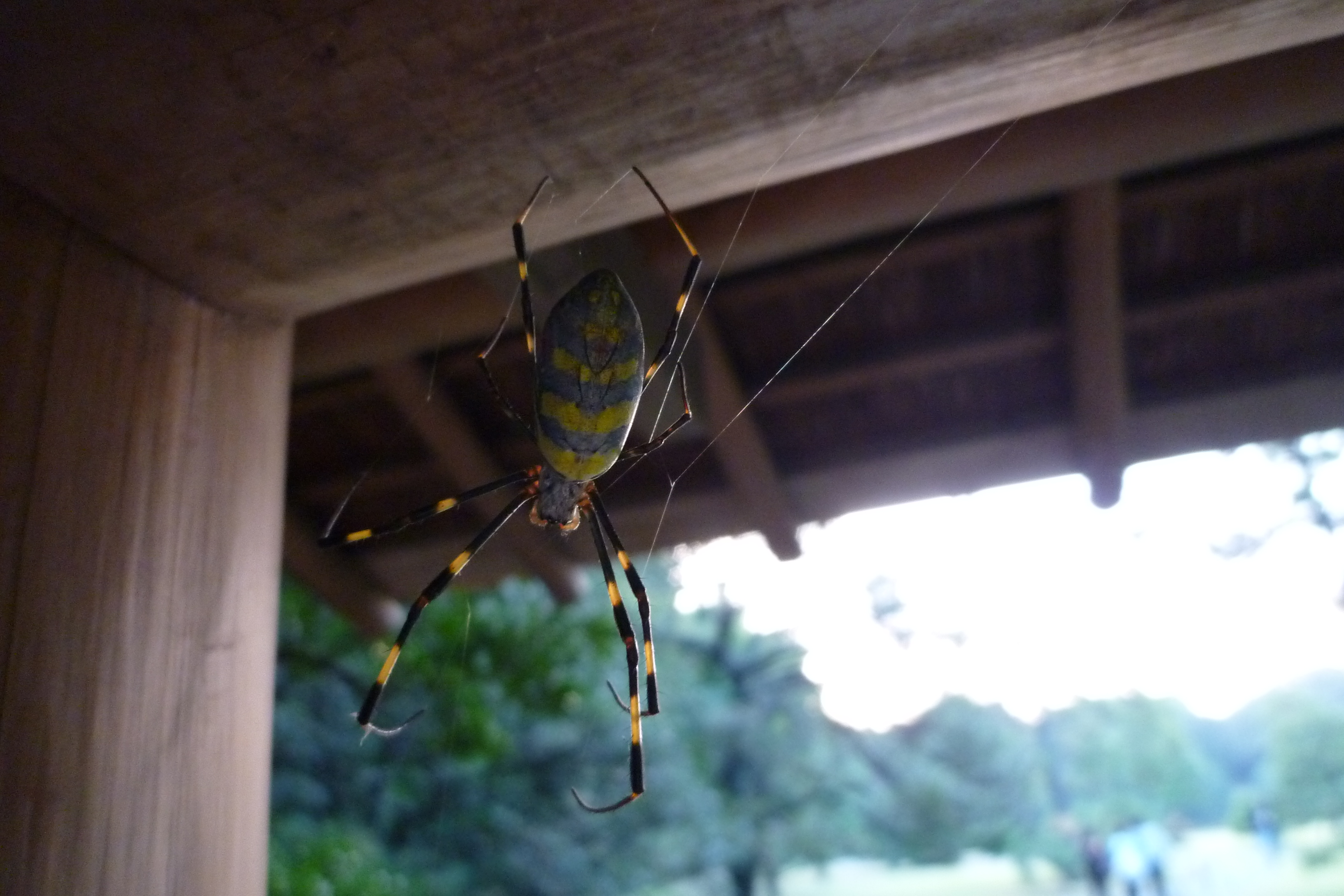
Female in Rikugi-en Gardens, Tokyo, Japan

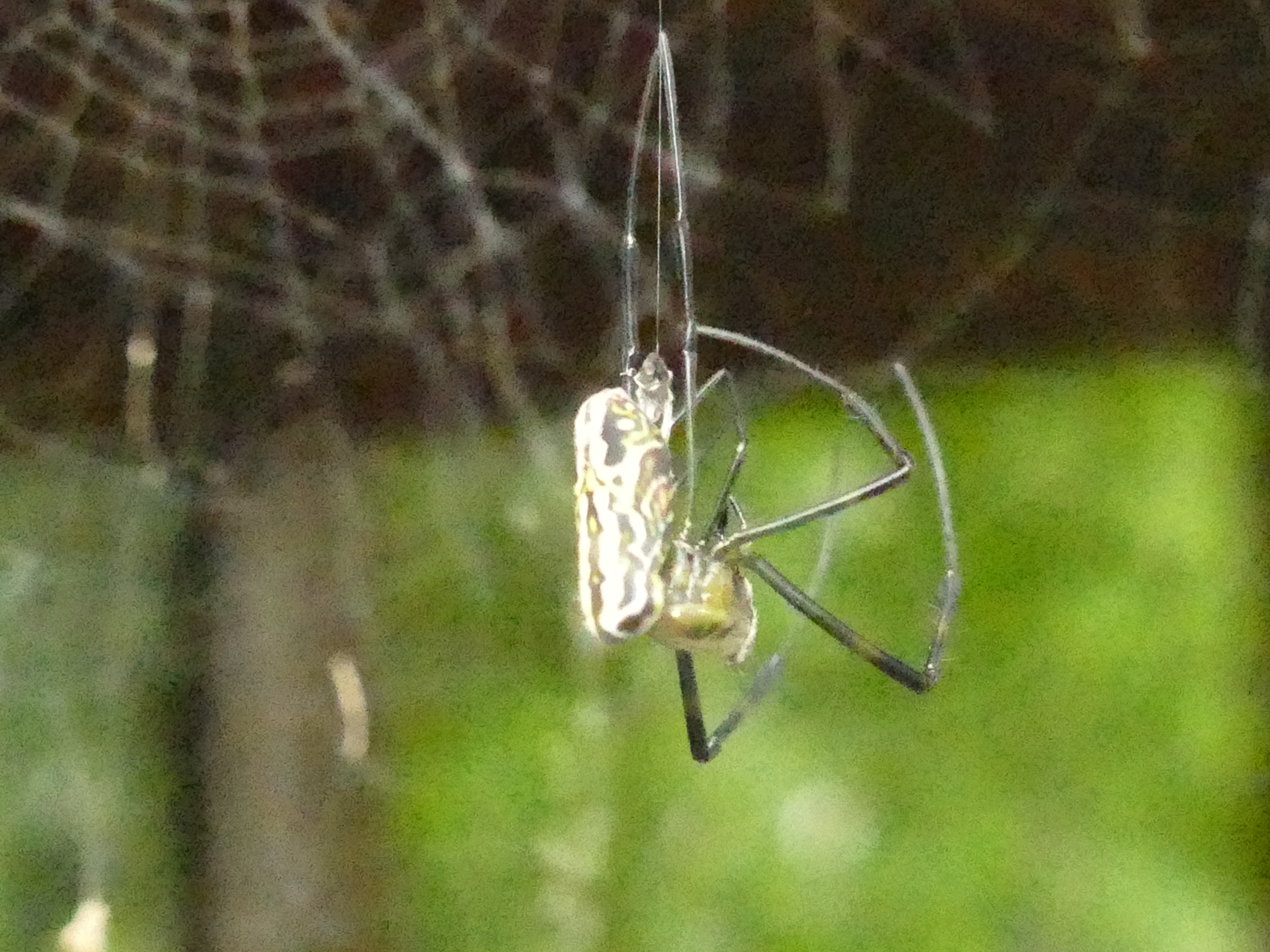
Juvenile female in Duluth, Georgia, US

== See also ==
- Joro toxin
- Nephila polyamine toxin 8
- Tegenaria parietina
