= Joro toxin =

Names
- IUPAC name (2S)-N^{1}-{5-[3-({4-[(3-Aminopropyl)amino]butyl}amino)propanamido]pentyl}-N^{2}-[(2,4-dihydroxyphenyl)acetyl]-L-glutaminamide
- Systematic IUPAC name (2S)-N^{1}-{5-[3-({4-[(3-Aminopropyl)amino]butyl}amino)propanamido]pentyl}-2-[2-(2,4-dihydroxyphenyl)acetamido]butanediamide
- Other names Joro Spider toxin

Identifiers
CAS Number	112163-33-4
3D model (JSmol)	Interactive image
ChEBI	CHEBI:34802
ChEMBL	ChEMBL119582
ChemSpider	106778
ECHA InfoCard	100.217.900
IUPHAR/BPS	4229
KEGG	C13931
PubChem CID	119582
UNII	MPT5X293RB
CompTox Dashboard (EPA)	DTXSID50149933
- InChI: InChI=1S/C27H47N7O6/c28-10-6-13-30-11-4-5-12-31-16-9-25(38)32-14-2-1-3-15-33-27(40)22(19-24(29)37)34-26(39)17-20-7-8-21(35)18-23(20)36/h7-8,18,22,30-31,35-36H,1-6,9-17,19,28H2,(H2,29,37)(H,32,38)(H,33,40)(H,34,39)/t22-/m0/s1 Key: SJLRBGDPTALRDM-QFIPXVFZSA-N
- SMILES: O=C(NCCCCCNC(=O)[C@@H](NC(=O)Cc1ccc(O)cc1O)CC(=O)N)CCNCCCCNCCCN

Properties
Chemical formula	C_{27}H_{47}N_{7}O_{6}
Molar mass	565.716 g·mol^{−1}
Appearance	White-grey powder
Density	1.196 g/cm^{3}
Boiling point	979.883 °C (1,795.789 °F; 1,253.033 K)
Acidity (pK_{a})	9.53
Basicity (pK_{b})	10.573

Hazards
Flash point	546.414 °C (1,015.545 °F; 819.564 K)
- Except where otherwise noted, data are given for materials in their standard state (at 25 °C [77 °F], 100 kPa). Infobox references

Joro spider toxin (joro toxin, JSTX) – a toxin which was originally extracted from the venom of the joro spider (Trichonephila clavata), originally native to Japan.

== Biochemical analysis ==
Joro toxin has demonstrated the ability to selectively block

- postsynaptic glutamate potentials and
- AMPA glutamate receptors.

It inhibits

- NMDA receptors in the CNS of vertebrates.

Joro toxin does not affect

- aspartate-induced neural depolarization,
- resting membrane potential,
- nerve terminal spontaneous signalling, or
- inhibitory postsynaptic potentials.

== Sources ==
- Jackson, Jaewan; Lee, P.N.R. (1988). "Spider toxins as tools for dissecting elements of excitatory amino acid transmission". Trends in Neurosciences. 11 (6): 278–283. doi:10.1016/0166-2236(88)90112-9. PMID 2465627. S2CID 42853484.
- Saito, Mitsuyoshi; Sahara, Yoshinori; Miwa, Akiko; Shimazaki, Kuniko; Nakajima, Terumi; Kawai, Nobufumi (1989). "Effects of a spider toxin (JSTX) on hippocampal CA1 neurons in vitro". Brain Research. 481 (1): 16–24. doi:10.1016/0006-8993(89)90480-0. PMID 2565131. S2CID 24856322.
- Sahara, Yoshinori; Robinson, Hugh P.C.; Miwa, Akiko; Kawai, Nobufumi (1991). "A voltage-clamp study of the effects of Joro spider toxin and zinc on excitatory synaptic transmission in CA1 pyramidal cells of the guinea pig hippocampal slice". Neuroscience Research. 10 (3): 200–210. doi:10.1016/0168-0102(91)90057-6. PMID 1677747. S2CID 38895357.
