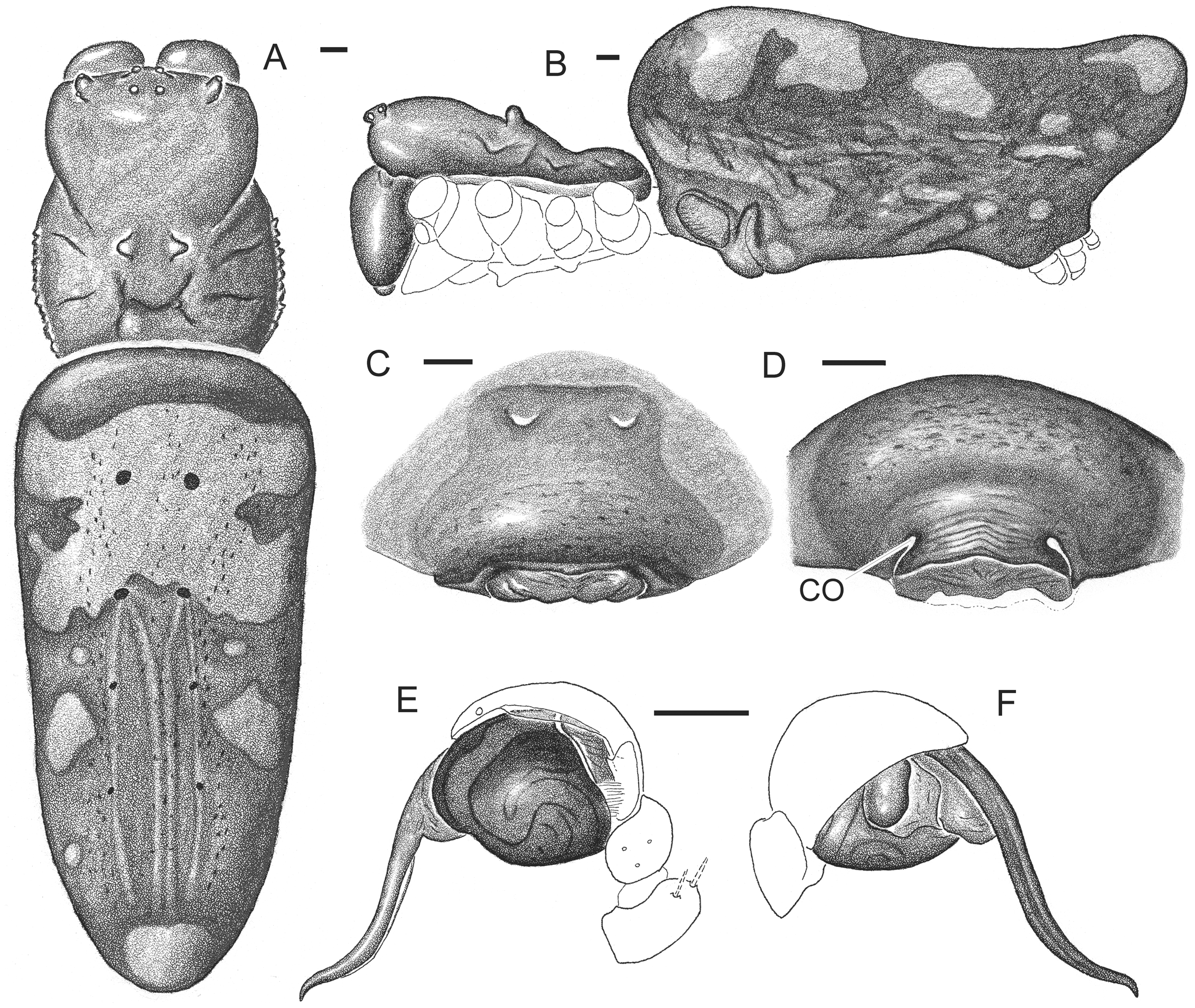
- Diagnostic drawings of female, and male + female reproductive organs

Scientific classification
- Kingdom: Animalia
- Phylum: Arthropoda
- Subphylum: Chelicerata
- Class: Arachnida
- Order: Araneae
- Infraorder: Araneomorphae
- Family: Nephilidae
- Genus: Trichonephila
- Species: T. komaci

Binomial name
- Trichonephila komaci (Kuntner & Coddington, 2009)

= Trichonephila komaci =

Giant Golden Orb-Web Spider

Species of spider

Trichonephila komaci is a species of spider in the family Araneidae. It is an African endemic commonly known as the giant golden orb-web spider. It is the largest web-spinning spider known.

== Distribution ==
This species was first identified in a Pretoria museum collection in 2000. The species is named in honor of Andrej Komac, a late friend of one of the arachnologists who reported its discovery in 2009. It was not discovered in the wild until 2007, when it was located in Tembe Elephant Park in South Africa.

It was one of the first new Nephila spiders to be discovered in more than a century; most were discovered in the 19th century. Trichonephila komaci occurs in Tanzania (Zanzibar), Madagascar, and South Africa. In South Africa, it is only recorded from a small area in KwaZulu-Natal.

== Habitat and ecology ==
The species has been sampled from the Indian Ocean Coastal Belt, Forest, and Savanna biomes. All known localities lie within two endangered biodiversity hotspots: Maputaland-Pondoland-Albany and Madagascar. Its only definitive current habitat is a sand forest in Tembe Elephant Park, which is in itself endangered.

Trichonephila komaci spins a large golden orb web, with a three dimensional barrier web at least in early instars. The two Tembe specimens were collected by beating a large shrub, thus the web was probably 2–4 metres (6 ft 7 in – 13 ft 1 in) above the ground. Two other Trichonephila species (T. inaurata, T. fenestrata) are sympatric at Tembe.

== Description ==
N. komaci females are the largest Nephila yet discovered. Displaying sexual size dimorphism commonly observed in various species of spiders, the size of a male reaches a leg span of only about 2.5 centimetres (0.98 in), with a body length of about 9 mm, roughly one fifth of that of a female. The tip-to-tip leg span of a female is about 12 cm (4.7 in; body length c. 4 cm (1.6 in)), with a web that is equally impressive in size, measuring more than a metre in diameter.

Regarding reproduction, males wait for a female to molt, and immediately afterwards inseminate her, breaking off their genitalia within the female, which thereby acts as a plug to prevent other males from mating with her. The now sterile male then spends the rest of his life (life span: about one year) driving away other males. Nevertheless, females with several dismembered male organs within them have been found.

== Conservation ==
Trichonephila komaci is listed as Least Concern by the South African National Biodiversity Institute due to its wide geographical range, though it is evidently rare with only 37 museum collections known in addition to field searches. The species is protected in Tembe Elephant Park.

== Taxonomy ==
The species was originally described by Kuntner & Coddington in 2009 from KwaZulu-Natal. The species is known from both sexes.
