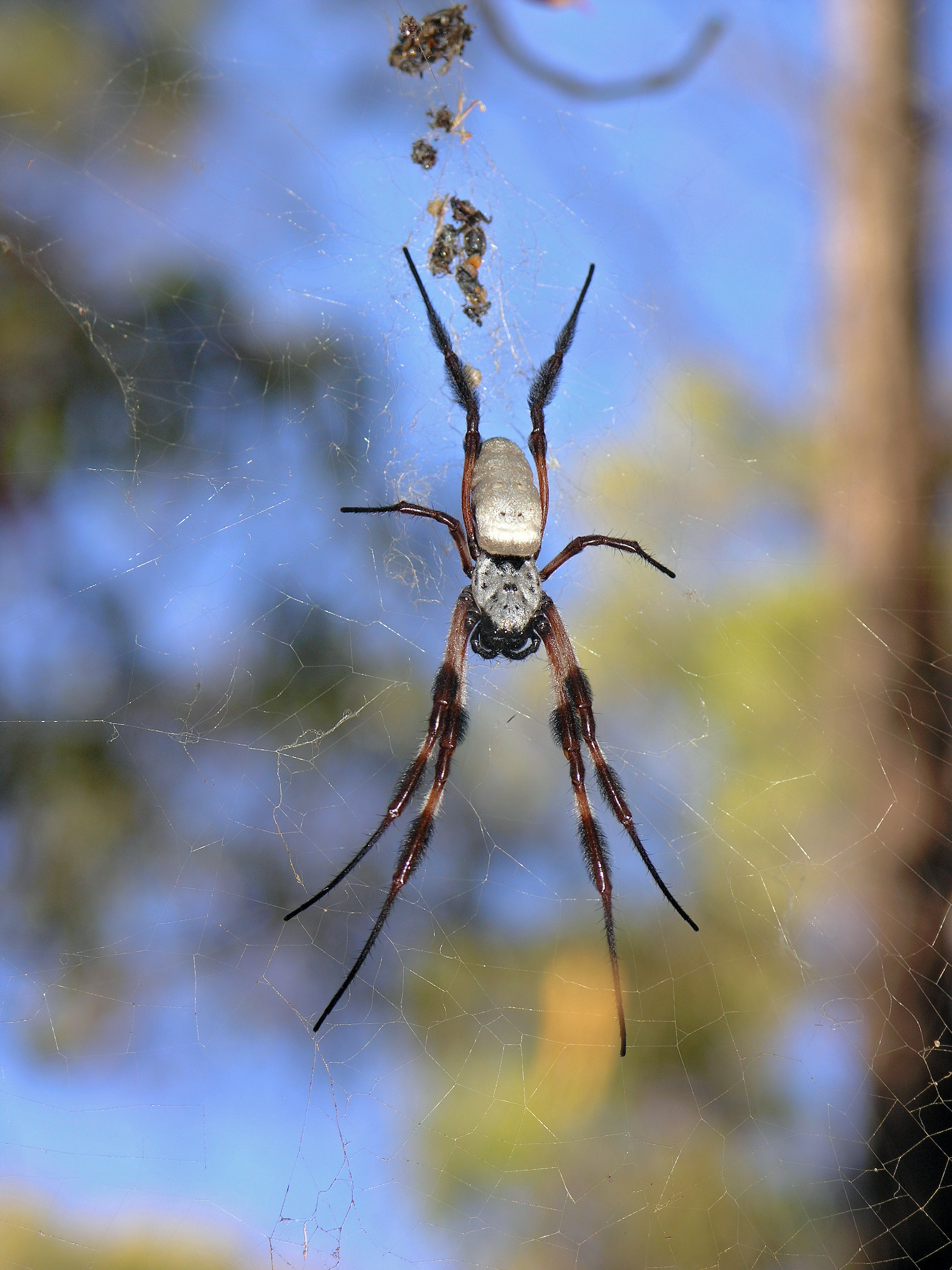
- Female Trichonephila edulis, Perth, Western Australia.

Conservation status
- Least Concern (IUCN 3.1)

Scientific classification
- Kingdom: Animalia
- Phylum: Arthropoda
- Subphylum: Chelicerata
- Class: Arachnida
- Order: Araneae
- Infraorder: Araneomorphae
- Family: Nephilidae
- Genus: Trichonephila
- Species: T. edulis

Binomial name
- Trichonephila edulis (Labillardière, 1799)
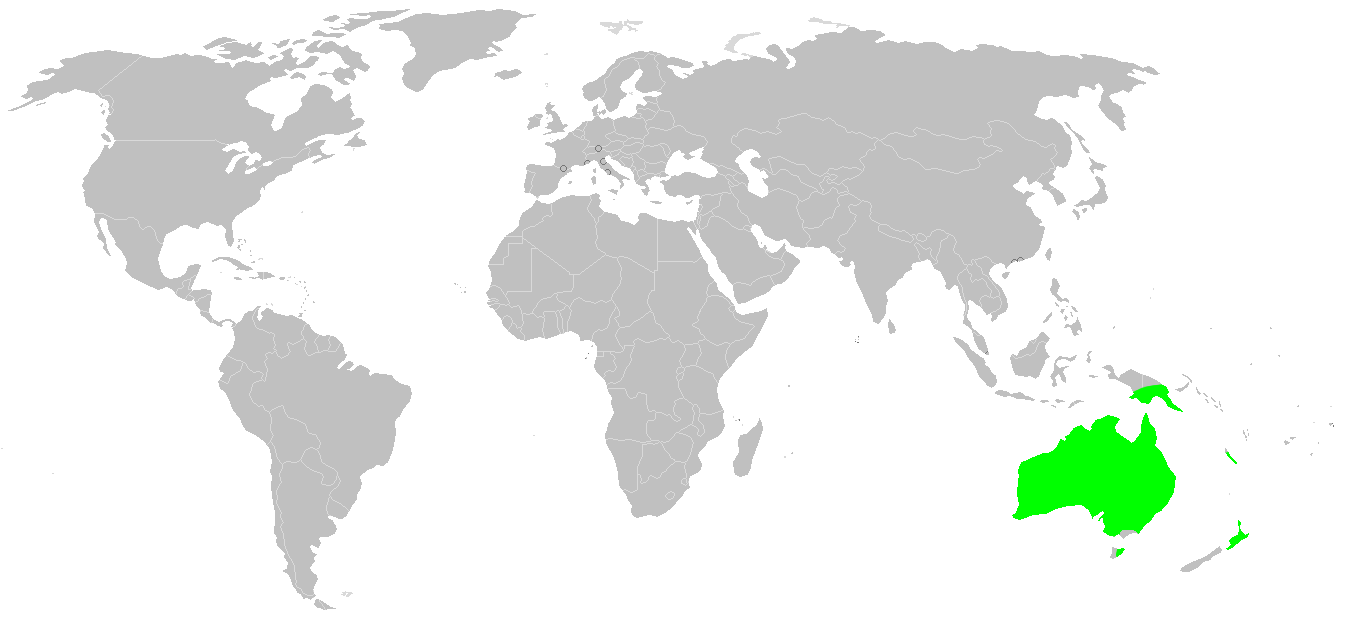

Synonyms
- Aranea edulis (basionym); Epeira edulis Nephila edulis Nephila imperatrix Nephila eremiana

= Trichonephila edulis =

Species of spider

Trichonephila edulis is a species of large spider of the family Nephilidae, formerly placed in the genus Nephila. It is referred to by the common name Australian golden orb weaver. It is found in Indonesia from Java eastwards, Papua New Guinea, Australia, northern New Zealand, and New Caledonia.

It has a large body size variability, females can reach a body length of up to 40 millimetres, males about 7 mm. The cephalothorax is black with a white pattern on the back, and a yellow underside; the abdomen is grey to brown.

The web is about 1 metre in diameter and protected on one or both sides by a strong "barrier" web. T. edulis breeds from February to May, and produces an average of 380 eggs.

T. edulis is closely related to Trichonephila plumipes (tiger spider) which is also commonly found in Australia.

== Name ==
The species was first collected and named by Jacques Labillardiere, in Relation du Voyage à la Recherche de la Pérouse (1799), becoming the second Australian spider to be described by a European naturalist. (The first was Gasteracantha fornicata.)

The species name edulis means "edible" in Latin. Labillardiere wrote: "Les habitans de la Nouvelle-Calédonie appellent nougui cette espèce d'araignée, que je désigne sous le nom d' aranea edulis (araignée que les Calédoniens mangent)." ("The inhabitants of New Caledonia call this spider nougui. I have described it under the name Aranea edulis, meaning spiders that the New Caledonians eat.")

== As food ==
Trichonephilia edulis is an edible spider. Several related spiders are considered a delicacy in New Guinea, "plucked by the legs from their webs and lightly roasted over an open fire".

== Gallery ==
Images of T. edulis
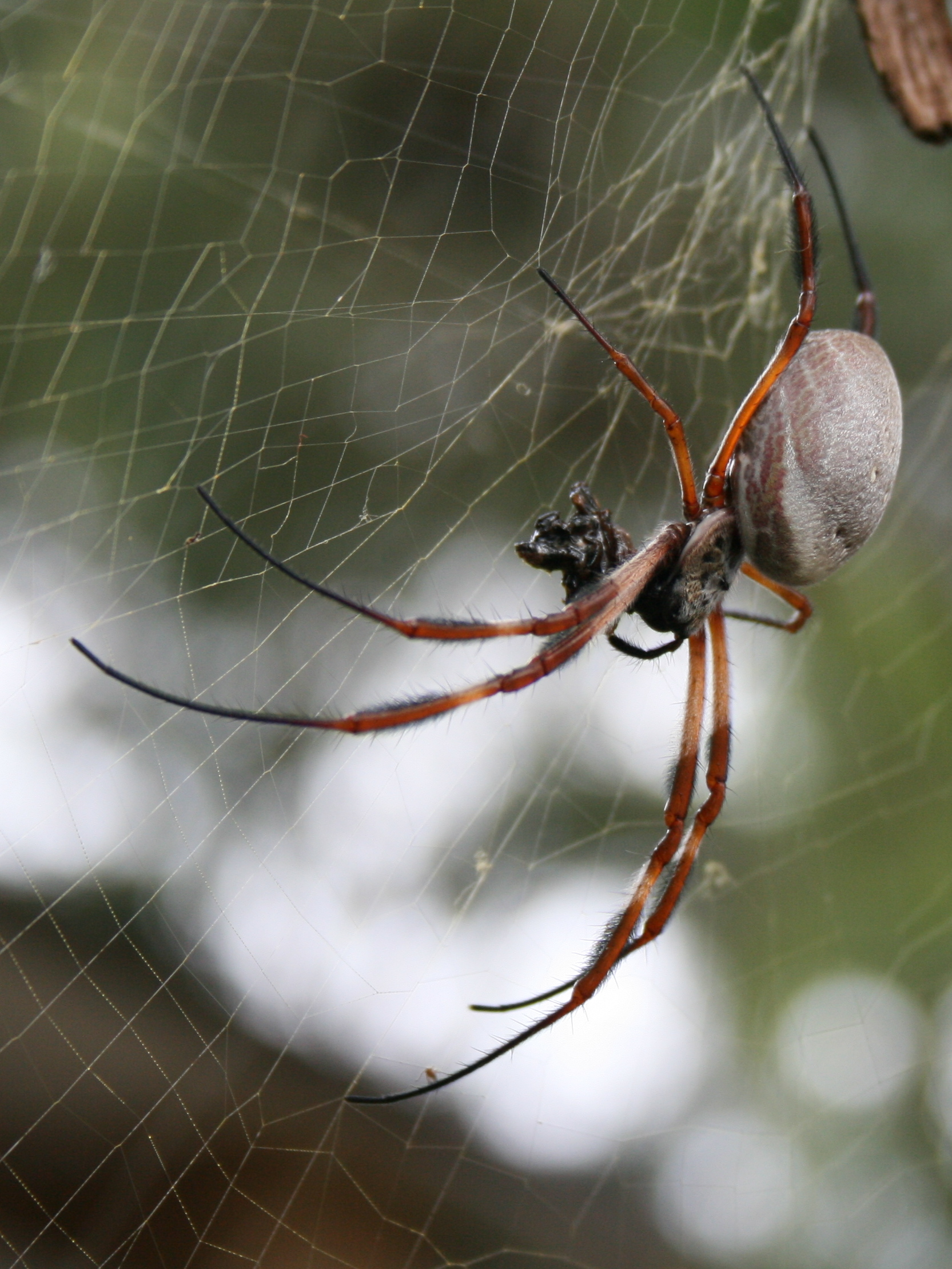
Side view, Sydney female

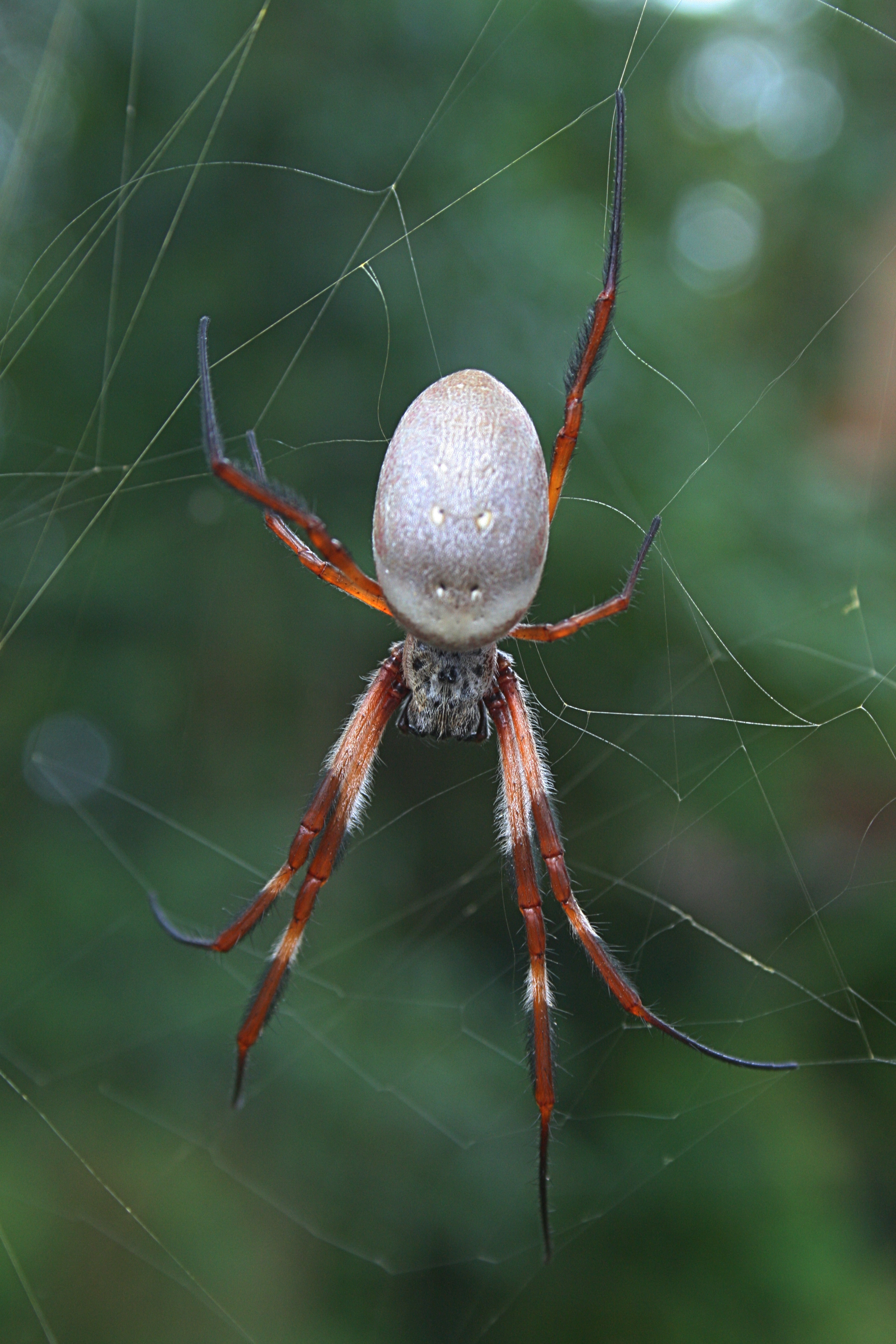
Back view, Sydney female

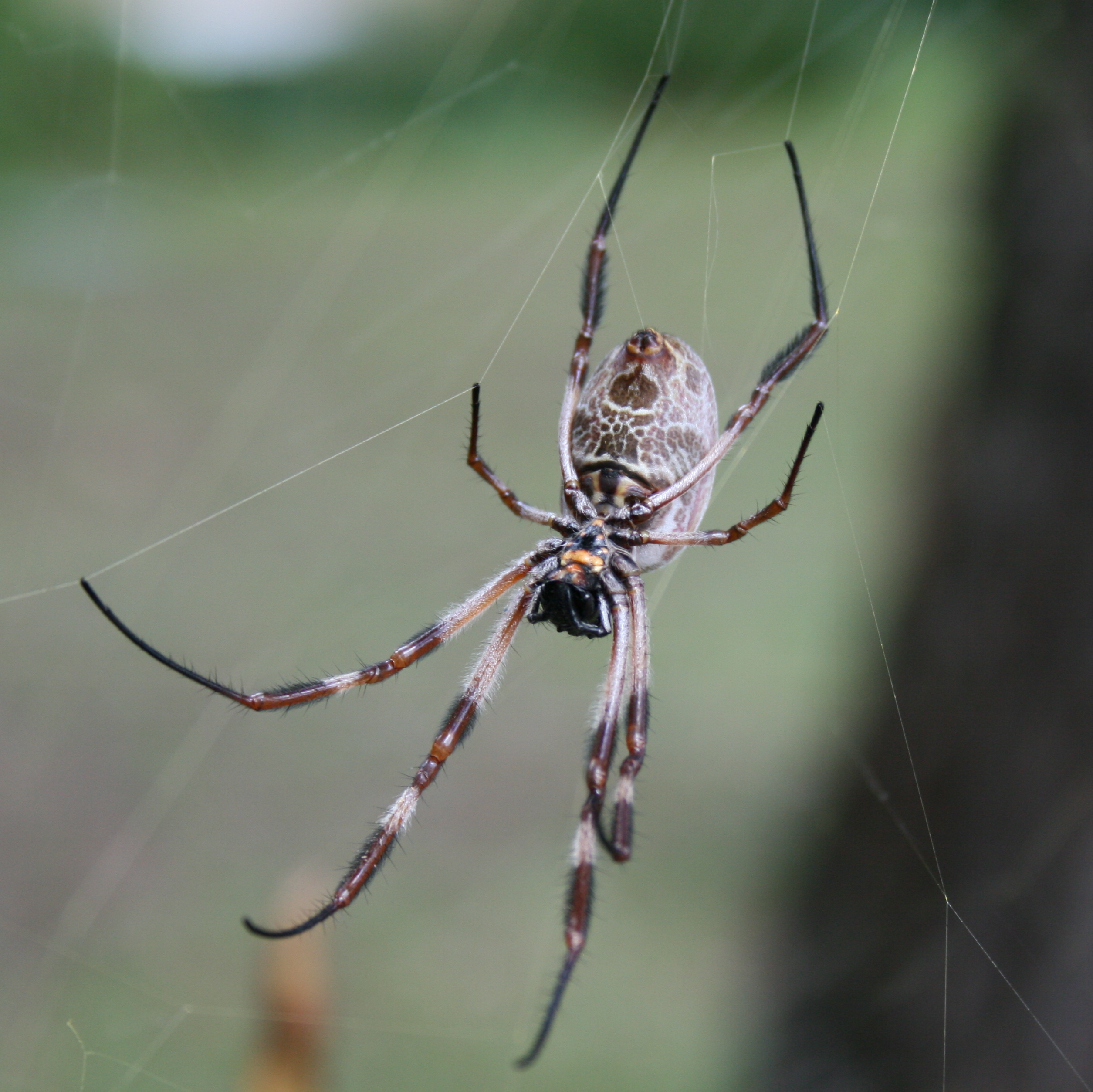
Bottom view, Sydney female

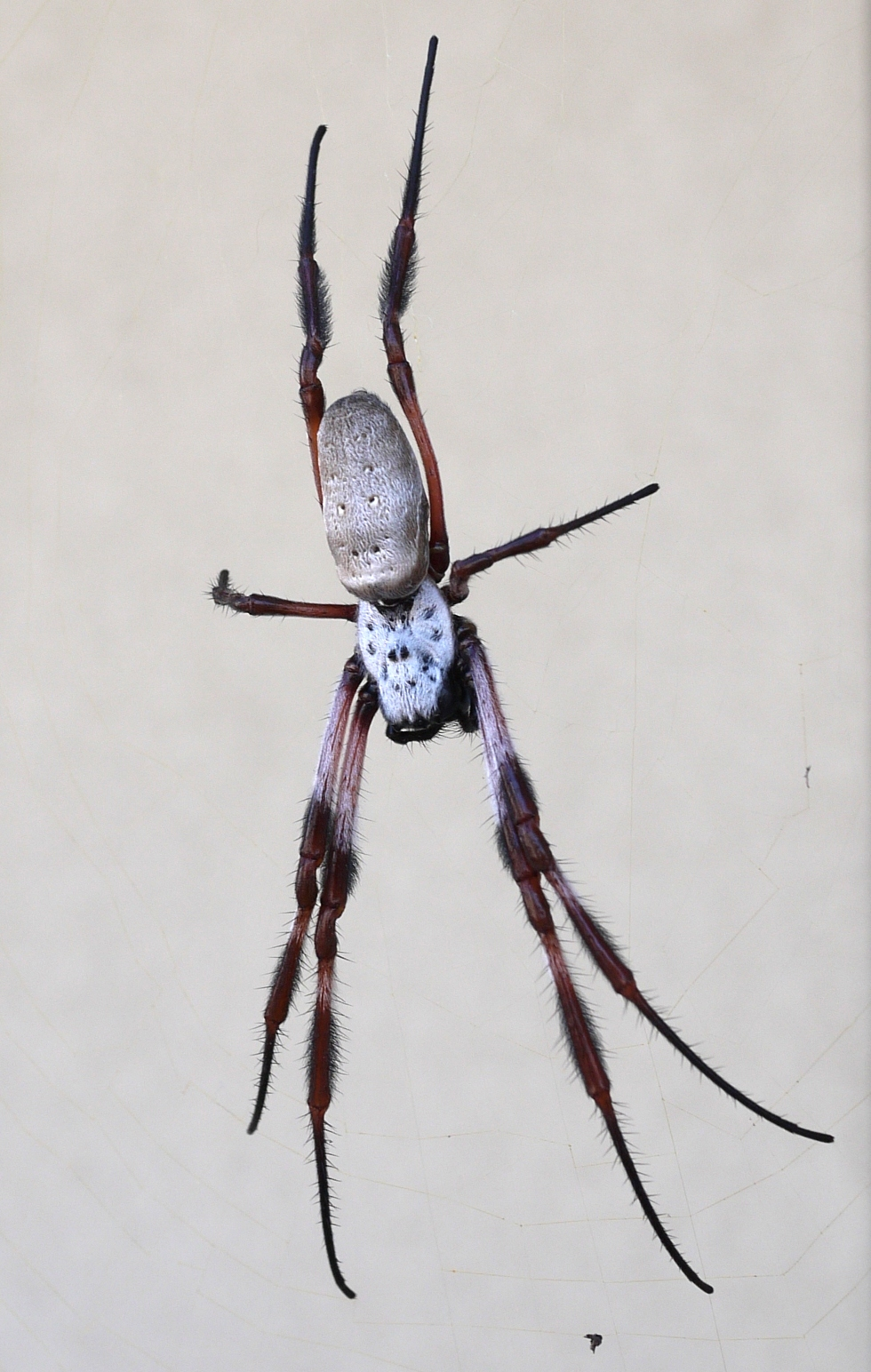
Back view, Western Australia female

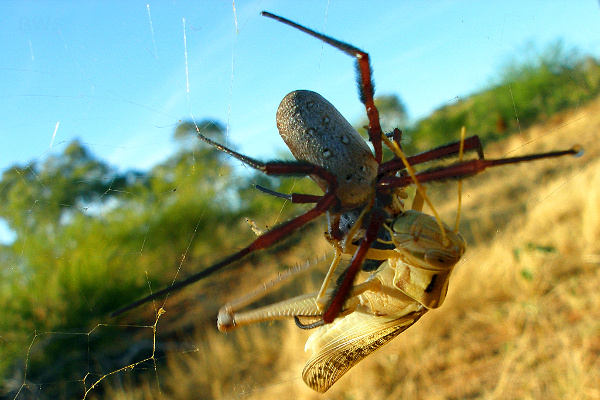
A Queensland female and a locust fight in its web

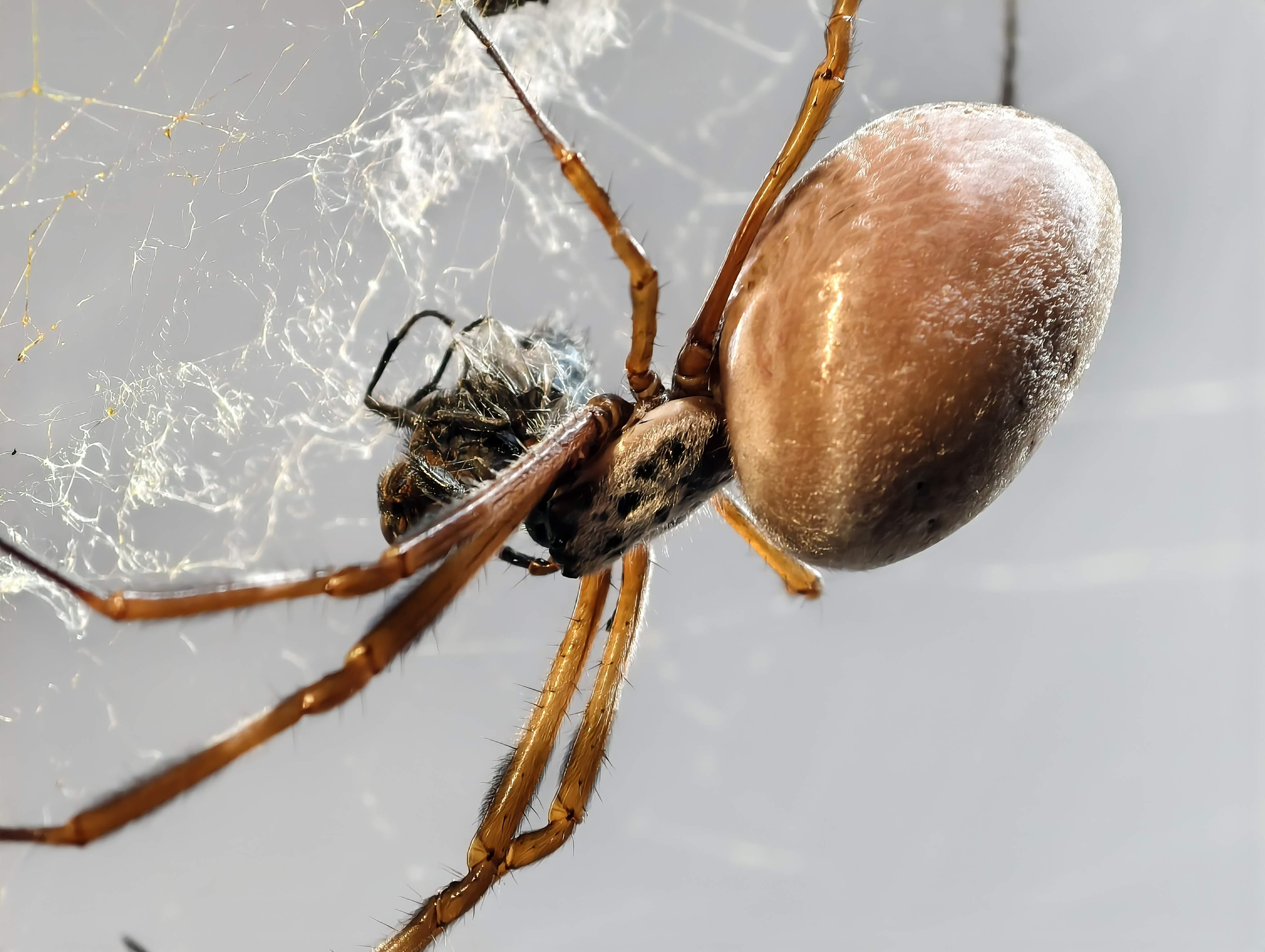
Australian golden orb weaver (Trichonephila edulis) with prey, London ZOO, United Kingdom

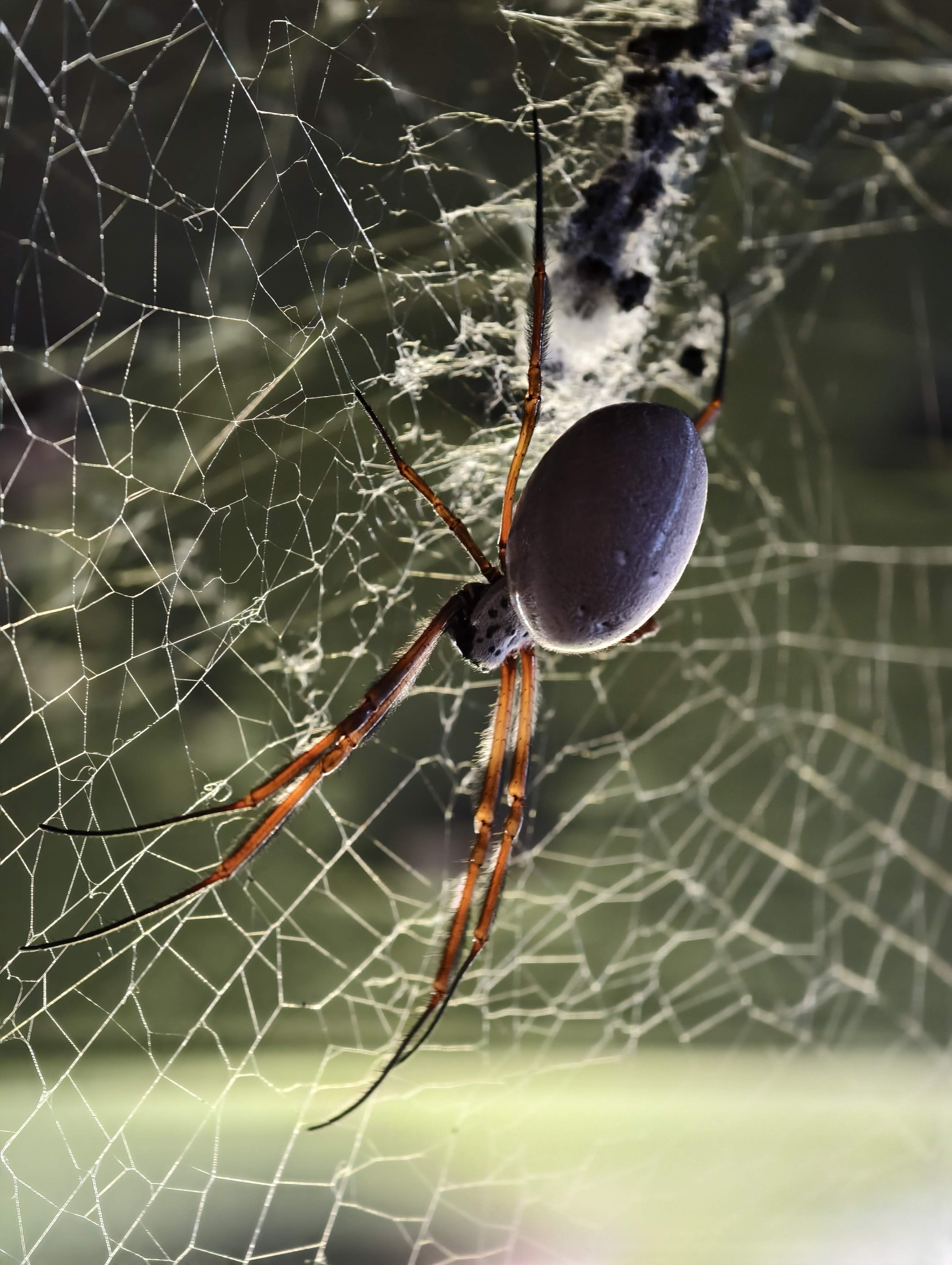
Australian golden orb weaver (Trichonephila edulis), London ZOO, United Kingdom
