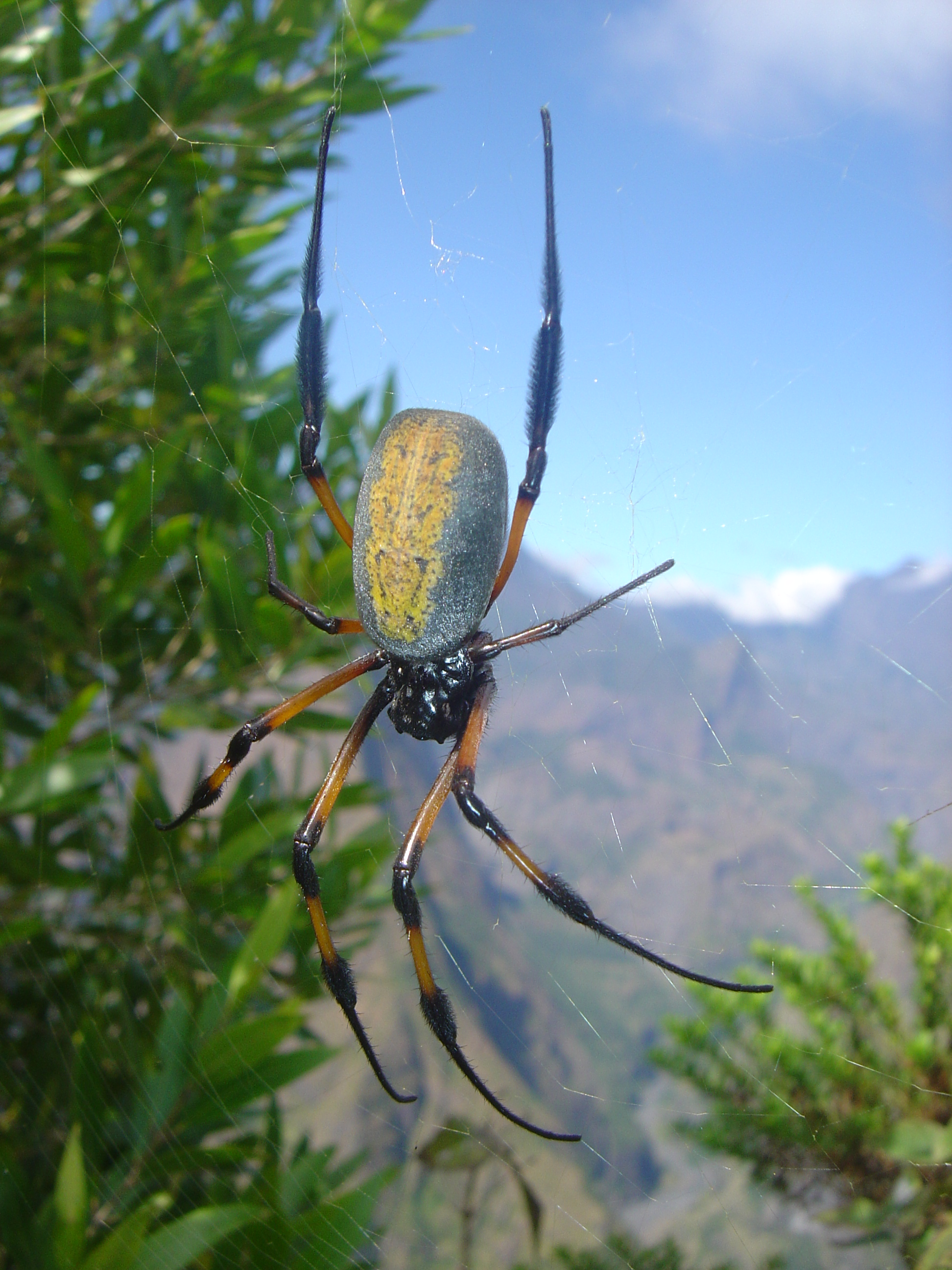
- Nominate subspecies in Réunion
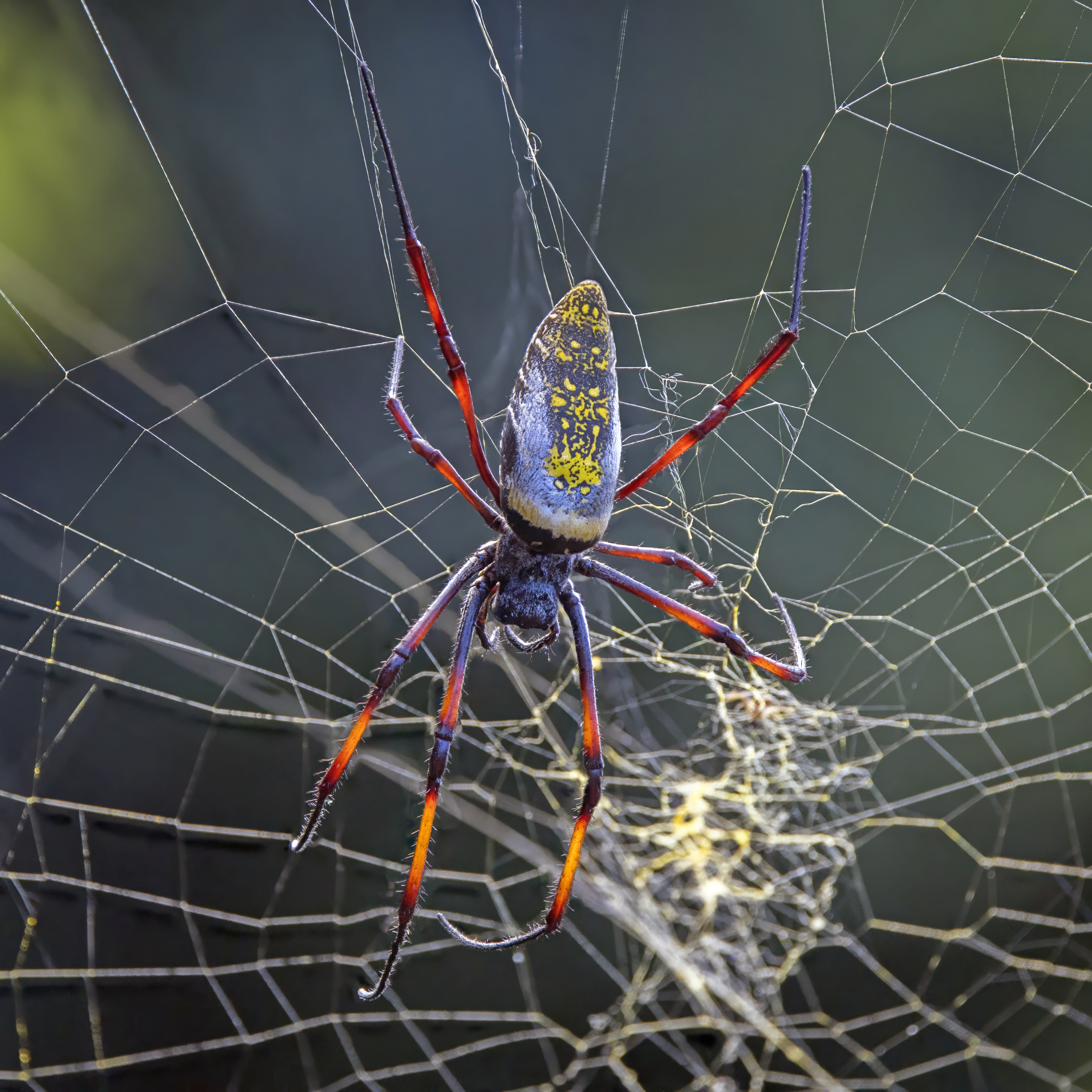
- T. i. madagascariensis female in Mozambique

Conservation status
- Least Concern (IUCN 3.1)

Scientific classification
- Kingdom: Animalia
- Phylum: Arthropoda
- Subphylum: Chelicerata
- Class: Arachnida
- Order: Araneae
- Infraorder: Araneomorphae
- Family: Nephilidae
- Genus: Trichonephila
- Species: T. inaurata

Binomial name
- Trichonephila inaurata (Charles Walckenaer, 1842)

Synonyms
- Epeira inaurata

= Trichonephila inaurata =

Red-legged golden orb-weaver spider

Species of spider

Trichonephila inaurata, synonym Nephila inaurata, commonly known as the red-legged golden orb-weaver spider or red-legged nephila, is a species of spider of the genus Trichonephila. It is native to southern and East Africa, as well as several islands of the western Indian Ocean (Madagascar, the Seychelles, Réunion, Mauritius, Rodrigues).

== Web spinning and structure ==
Trichonephila spiders produce large asymmetric orb webs up to 1.5 m (5 ft) in diameter. Trichonephila species remain in their webs permanently, so have a higher predation risk. The golden silk orb-weaver is named for the yellow color of the spider silk used to construct these webs.

Yellow threads of their web shine like gold in sunlight. Carotenoids are the main contributors to this yellow color, but xanthurenic acid, two quinones, and an unknown compound may also aid in the color. Experimental evidence suggests that the silk's color may serve a dual purpose: sunlit webs ensnare bees that are attracted to the bright yellow strands, whereas in shady spots, the yellow blends in with background foliage to act as a camouflage. The spider is able to adjust pigment intensity relative to background light levels and color; the range of spectral reflectance is specifically adapted to insect vision.

The webs of most Trichonephila spiders are complex, with a fine-meshed orb suspended in a maze of non-sticky barrier webs. As with many weavers of sticky spirals, the orb is renewed regularly if not daily, apparently because the stickiness of the orb declines with age. When weather is good (and no rain has damaged the orb web), subadults and adults often rebuild only a portion of the web. The spider removes and consumes the portion to be replaced, builds new radial elements, then spins the new spirals. This partial orb renewal is distinct from other orb-weaving spiders that usually replace the entire orb web. The web of Nephila antipodiana contains ant-repellent chemicals to protect the web.

Typically, the golden orb-weaver first weaves a nonsticky spiral with space for two to 20 more spirals in between (the density of sticky spiral strands decreases with increasing spider size). When she has completed the coarse weaving, she returns and fills in the gaps. Whereas most orb-weaving spiders remove the nonsticky spiral when spinning the sticky spiral, Trichonephila spiders leave it. This produces a "manuscript paper" effect when the orb is seen in the sun: groups of sticky spirals reflecting light with "gaps" where the nonsticky spiral does not reflect the light.

In relation to the ground, the webs of adults may be woven from eye-level upwards high into the tree canopy. The orb web is usually truncated by a top horizontal support strand, giving it an incomplete look.

Adjacent to one face of the main orb, a rather extensive and haphazard-looking network of guard-strands may be suspended a few cm distant across a free space. This network is often decorated with a lumpy string or two of plant detritus and insect carcasses clumped with silk. This "barrier web" may function as a kind of early-warning system for incoming prey or against spider-hunting predators, or as a shield against windblown leaves; it may also be remnants of the owner's previous web. At least one reference explains the suspended debris-chain as a cue for birds to avoid blundering into and destroying the web.

== Habits ==
Like other spiders in the subfamily Nephilinae, it can weave webs so strong that sometimes even birds and bats get caught. Its webs can be found in damp places such as large trees and unpolluted areas to which no cars have access; normally several are strung together to form enormous "homes" so as to cover as much surface area as possible.

== Prey ==
This species feeds on flies, mosquitoes, moths, wasps and beetles who happen to get tangled up.

== Subspecies ==
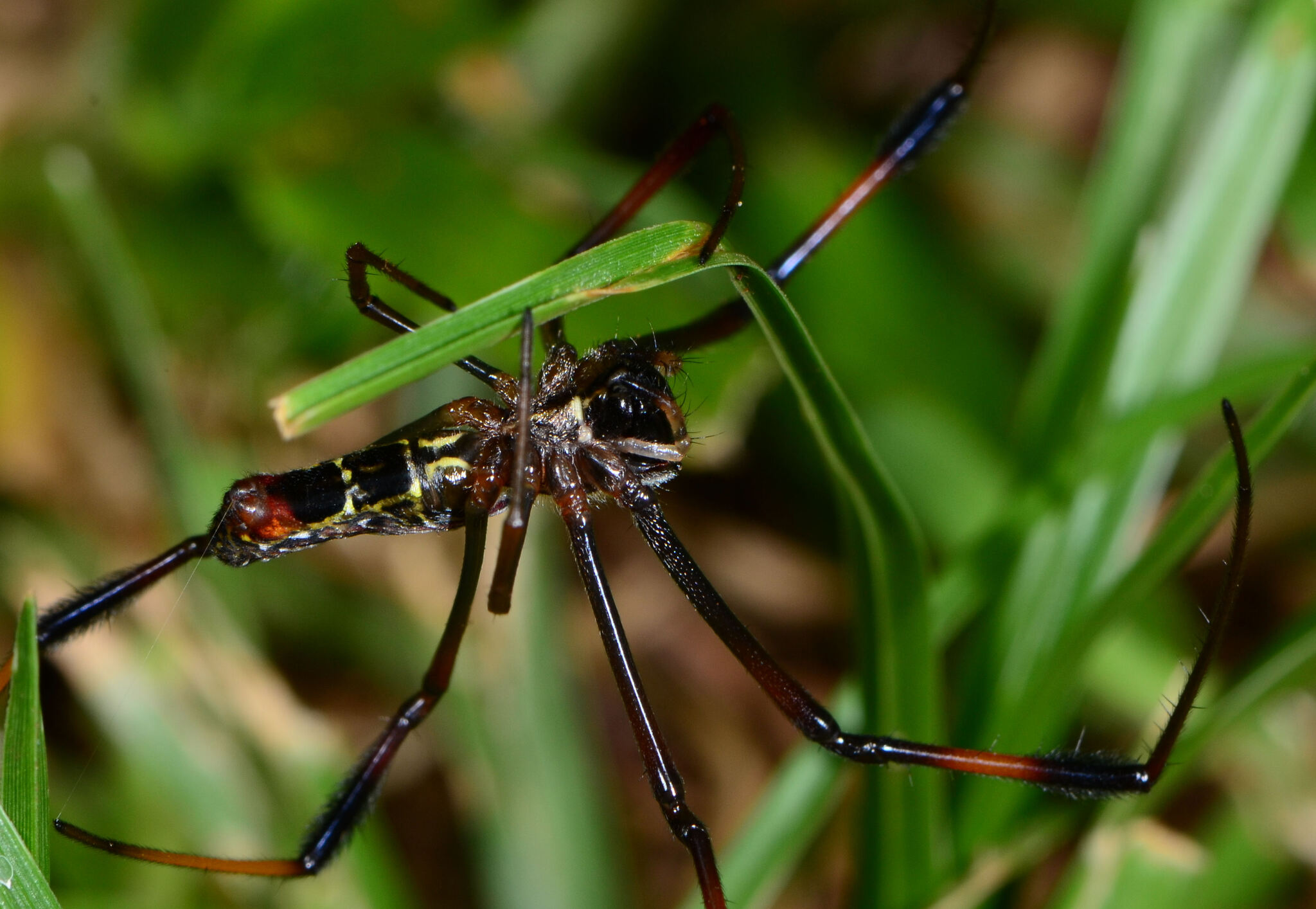
female T. i. madagascariensis

In addition to the nominate subspecies (T. i. inaurata) of Mauritius and Réunion, a second subspecies is currently recognized: T. i. madagascariensis (Vinson, 1863), which occurs from South Africa to the Seychelles.

== Captive breeding ==
This species is commonly kept in captivity. Egg sacs the size of a small marble are made of thick silk and contain 100-200 eggs which hatch after two months. They start out with a 2mm leg span and grow rapidly. Males mature in one to two months depending on the form. A small percentage of males mature early and resemble a small, black crab spider with only an 8-10mm leg span. Most males mature later and resemble the form of the female but have very little color and only a 25-30mm leg span. Females mature in four months with an approximate 100mm leg span.

== See also ==
- Golden Spider Silk Cape
