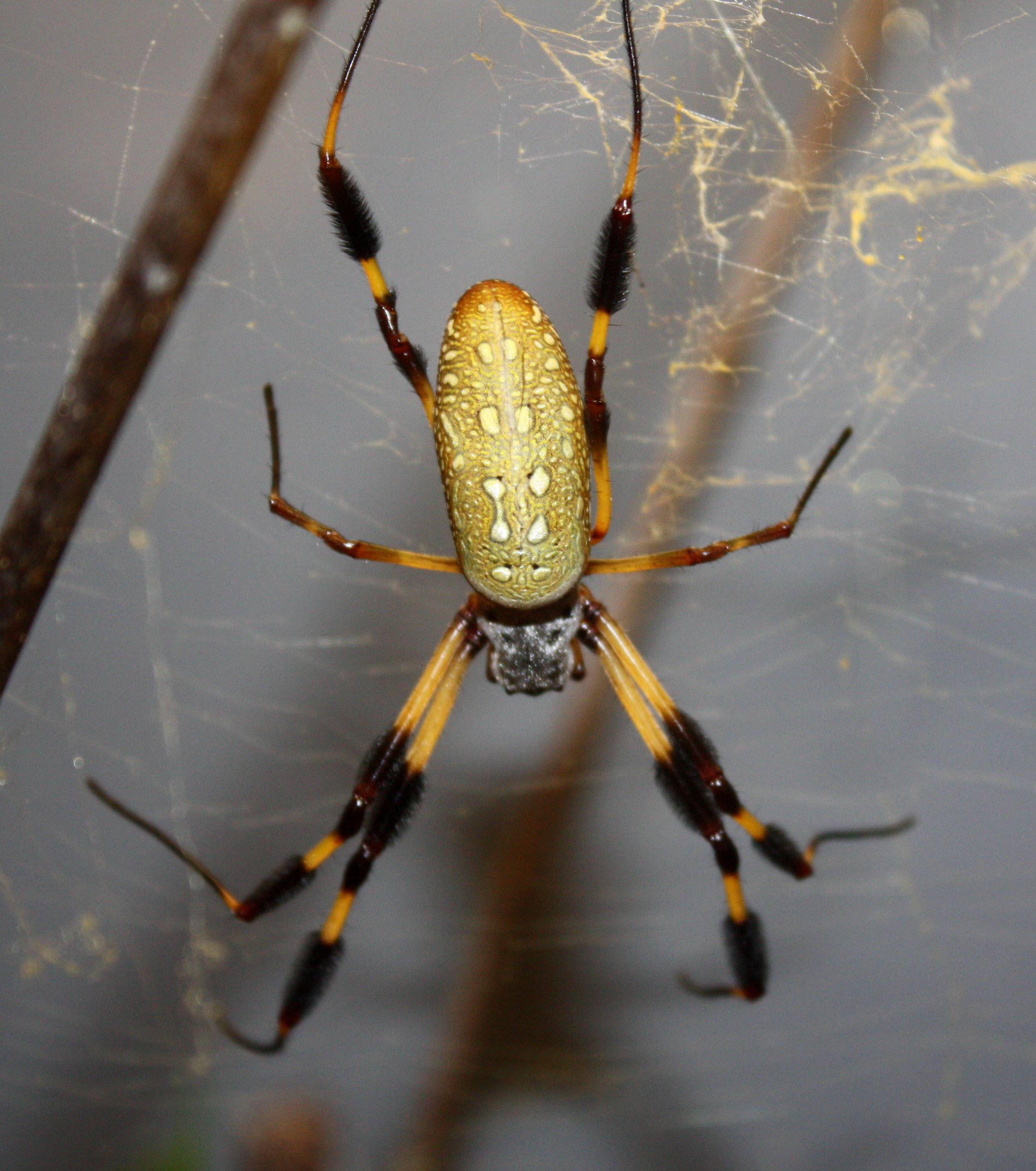
- Female Trichonephila clavipes
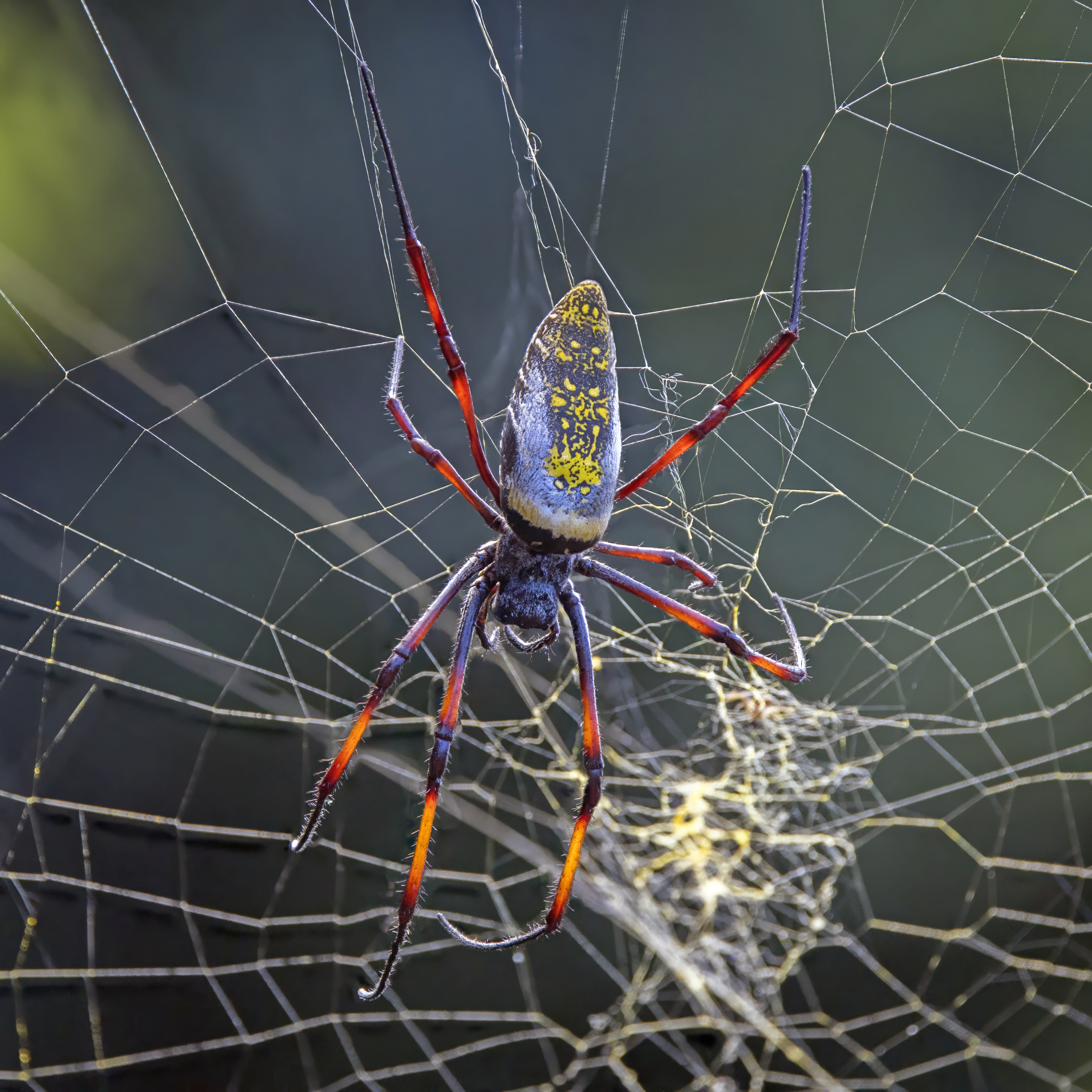
- Female T. inaurata madagascariensis

Scientific classification
- Kingdom: Animalia
- Phylum: Arthropoda
- Subphylum: Chelicerata
- Class: Arachnida
- Order: Araneae
- Infraorder: Araneomorphae
- Family: Nephilidae
- Genus: Trichonephila; Dahl, 1911

Type species
- T. clavipes (Linnaeus, 1767)

Species
- 13, see text

= Trichonephila =

Genus of spiders

Trichonephila is a genus of golden orb-weaver spiders that was first described by Friedrich Dahl in 1911, as a subgenus of Nephila. Trichonephila was elevated to a genus by Kuntner et al. in 2019.

== Distribution and habitat ==
Trichonephila can be found living in Africa, Oceania, Asia, Central America, the West Indies, South America, and the US' southeastern region and gulf states. These spiders like to make webs where prey is fruitful, often in open wooded areas, between tree branches, shrubs, tall grasses, and around light fixtures. Males are more active in the months of July to September, while the females are most active late into fall.

== Behavior ==
=== Web building ===
Trichonephila species build large (1–1.5 m) orb webs between trees and shrubs. The viscid spiral of the web is yellowish and the radii are pulled out of their direct course to give it a notched appearance. The supporting lines are very strong and some resistance is felt when one wanders into them. The spiders make use of the same web over long periods, replacing only the viscid lines. In older spiders the web may only be half a circle, while in younger individuals the orb is more complete.

The egg clutches are surrounded by fine puffy silk and are usually laid near the web on surrounding vegetation.

=== Sexual dimorphism ===
Female spiders are larger and dominate. One reason for the size difference is that following their mating sequence, the females sometimes cannibalize their mating partner. Male spiders fight over female partners, leaving the dominant spider to mate and potentially be killed by the female. Typically, female spiders choose a small male partner.

=== Courtship ===
Courtship dance involves a male mating dance, attempting to attract females. This dance involves multiple functions. To begin the courtship, a male must find a female’s web and make vibrations to let her know he’s not prey. It is common for the male to be mistaken as prey and eaten alive by the females before they mate. The vibrating reduces the risk of aggravating the female.

Most nephilids practice genitalic mutilation, with males breaking off the embolus during mating in an effort to plug the epigyne of females and prevent other males mating with her, a strategy that is not always successful.

=== Environmental adaptations ===
Males are the sex that leaves their webs and seeks a female. Trichonephila webs have a yellow colour due to the xanthurenic acid produced in its silk. It is thought that this colour helps attract prey. The genus exhibits behavioural adaptations to the heavy rainfall of its tropical ecosystems. Upon heavy rain, the spider hangs off its web from only its fourth pair of legs, which in turn reduces rain impact damage and helps with draining the water off the web.

== Description ==
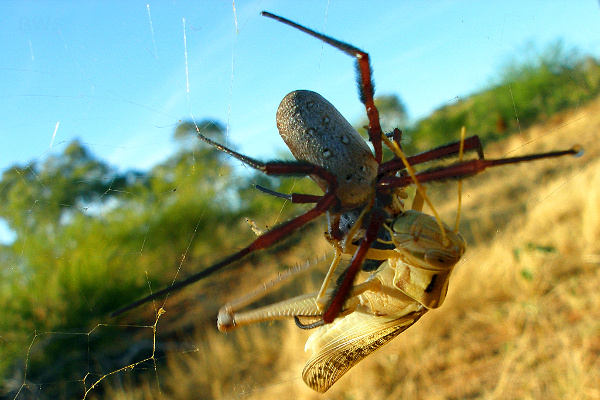
Trichonephila edulis with a locust caught in its web, Queensland, Australia

As with other nephilid spiders, the body size in Trichonephila is strongly sexually dimorphic, with females measuring 12–40 mm while males are much smaller.

The abdomen is large, elongate and cylindrical. Its color is black with bright blue, red, yellow, silvery and/or white markings, and the long and slender legs are sometimes banded or display a red hue. The carapace is longer than wide and features short, hornlike protuberances in females of the larger genera.

The eight eyes are arranged in two evenly spaced rows.

Each species can be recognized by its distinctive color pattern, which may show considerable intraspecific variation.

== Species ==
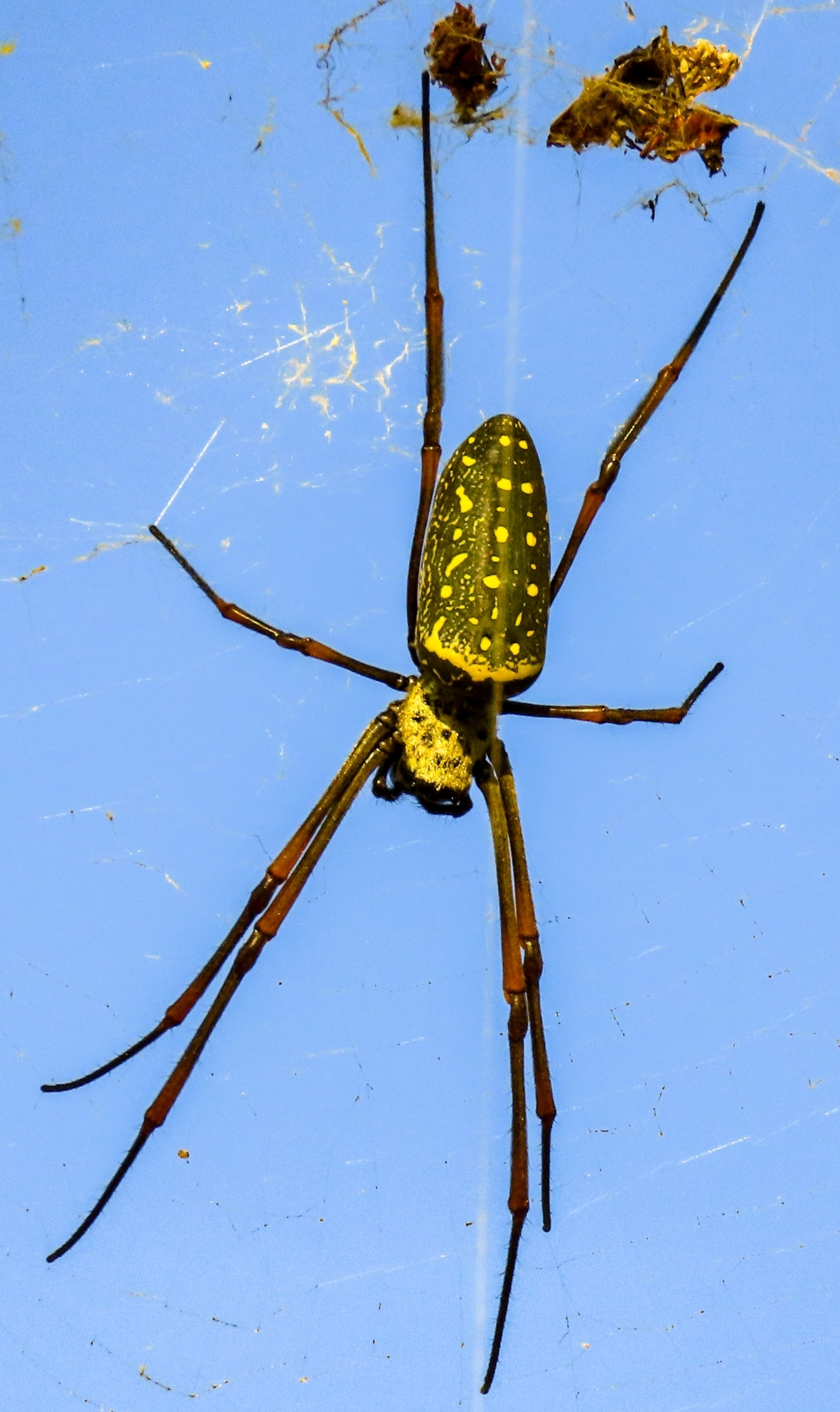
T. antipodiana

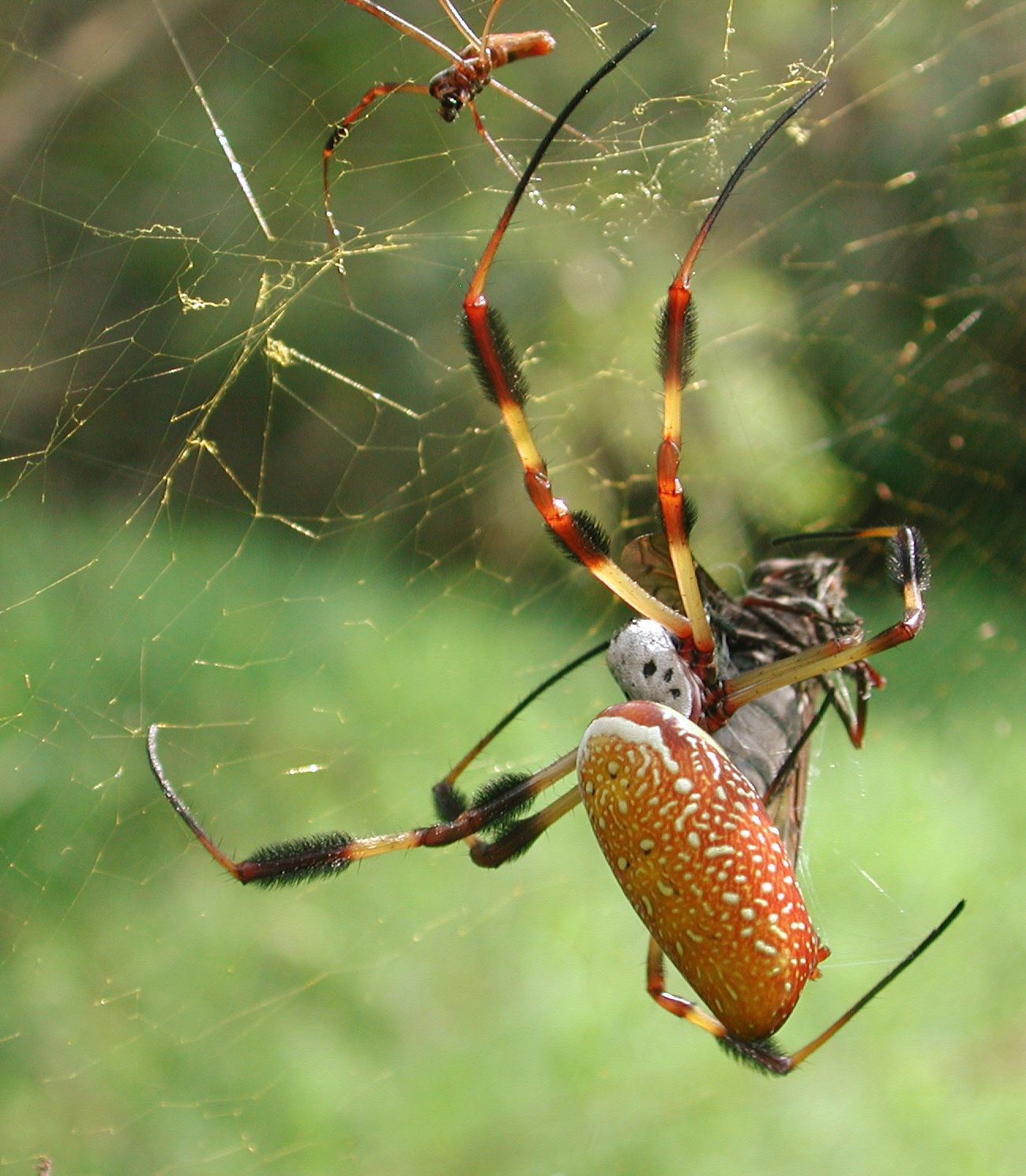
T. clavipes

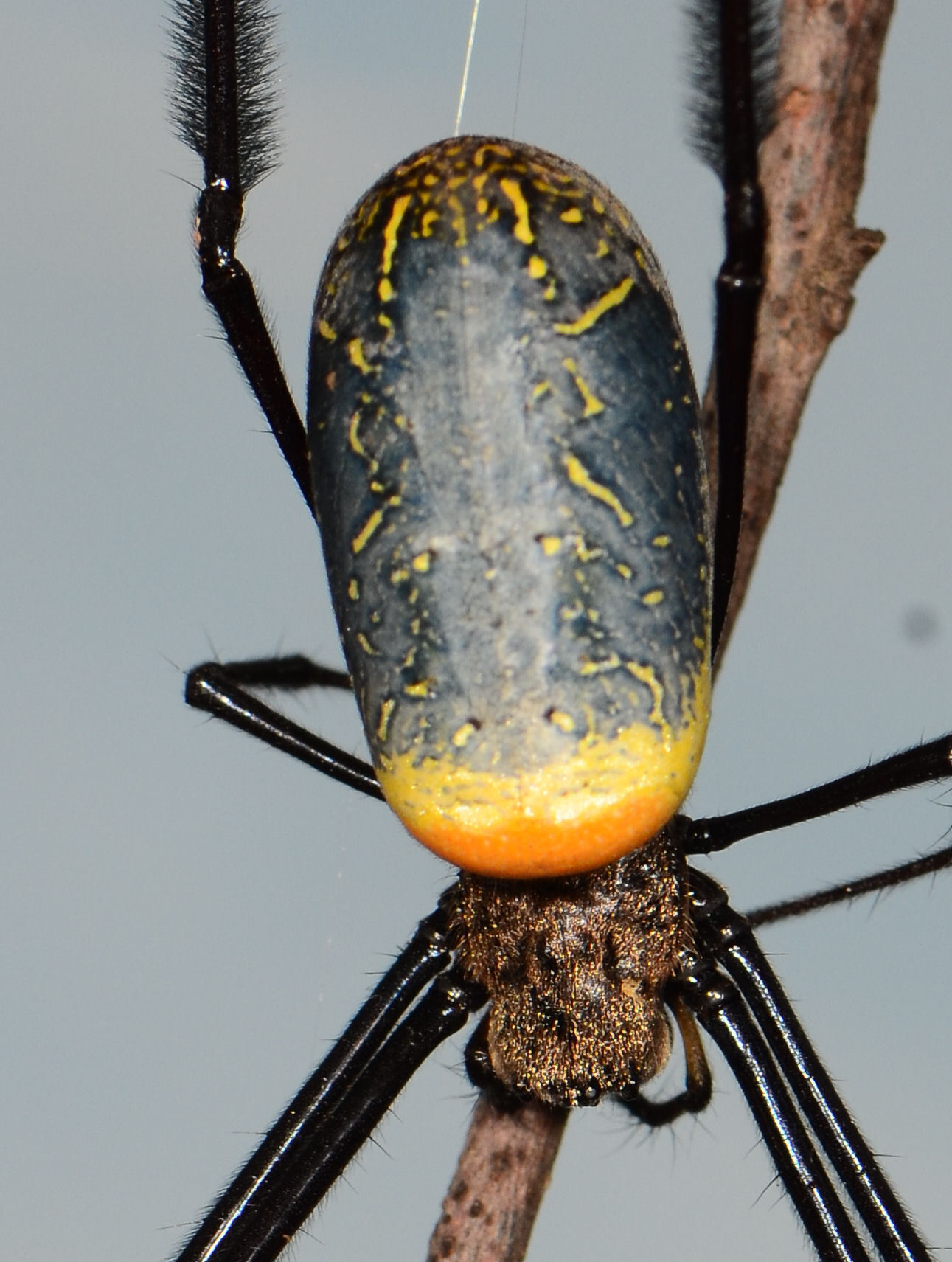
T. fenestrata

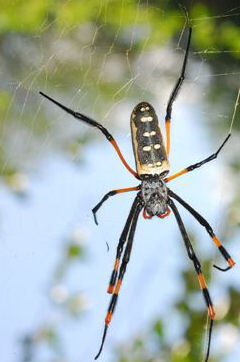
T. senegalensis

As of September 2025, this genus included 13 species and 14 subspecies, found in Africa, Oceania, Asia, and the Americas:

- Trichonephila antipodiana (Walckenaer, 1841) – China, Myanmar, Philippines, New Guinea, Solomon Is. Australia (Queensland)
- Trichonephila clavata (L. Koch, 1878) – India, Japan, Russia, (Far East), Introduced to Azerbaijan, United States
  - T. c. caerulescens (Ono, 2011) – Japan
- Trichonephila clavipes (Linnaeus, 1767) – United States, Argentina. Introduced to São Tomé and Príncipe (type species)
  - T. c. fasciculata (De Geer, 1778) – United States, Argentina
  - T. c. vespucea (Walckenaer, 1841) – Argentina
- Trichonephila edulis (Labillardière, 1799) – Australia, New Guinea, New Caledonia, New Zealand
- Trichonephila fenestrata (Thorell, 1859) – South Africa, Lesotho, Eswatini
  - T. f. fuelleborni (Dahl, 1912) – East Africa
  - T. f. venusta (Blackwall, 1865) – West, Central Africa
- Trichonephila inaurata (Walckenaer, 1841) – Mauritius, Réunion
  - T. i. madagascariensis (Vinson, 1863) – South Africa, Eswatini, Mayotte, Madagascar, Seychelles
- Trichonephila komaci (Kuntner & Coddington, 2009) – Tanzania (Zanzibar), South Africa, Madagascar
- Trichonephila plumipes (Latreille, 1804) – Indonesia, New Guinea, Australia, New Caledonia, Vanuatu, Solomon Islands New Ireland
- Trichonephila senegalensis (Walckenaer, 1841) – West Africa, Ethiopia
  - T. s. annulata (Thorell, 1859) – Namibia, South Africa, Eswatini
  - T. s. bragantina (Brito Capello, 1867) – Central Africa
  - T. s. hildebrandti (Dahl, 1912) – Madagascar
  - T. s. huebneri (Dahl, 1912) – East Africa
  - T. s. keyserlingi (Blackwall, 1865) – DR Congo, Kenya, Tanzania, Mozambique
  - T. s. nyikae (Pocock, 1898) – East Africa
  - T. s. schweinfurthi (Simon, 1890) – Yemen
- Trichonephila sexpunctata (Giebel, 1867) – Brazil, Paraguay, Argentina
- Trichonephila sumptuosa (Gerstaecker, 1873) – East Africa, Yemen (Socotra)
- Trichonephila turneri (Blackwall, 1833) – West, Central Africa
  - T. t. orientalis (Benoit, 1964) – Central, East Africa
- Trichonephila vitiana (Walckenaer, 1847) – Indonesia, Fiji, Tonga
