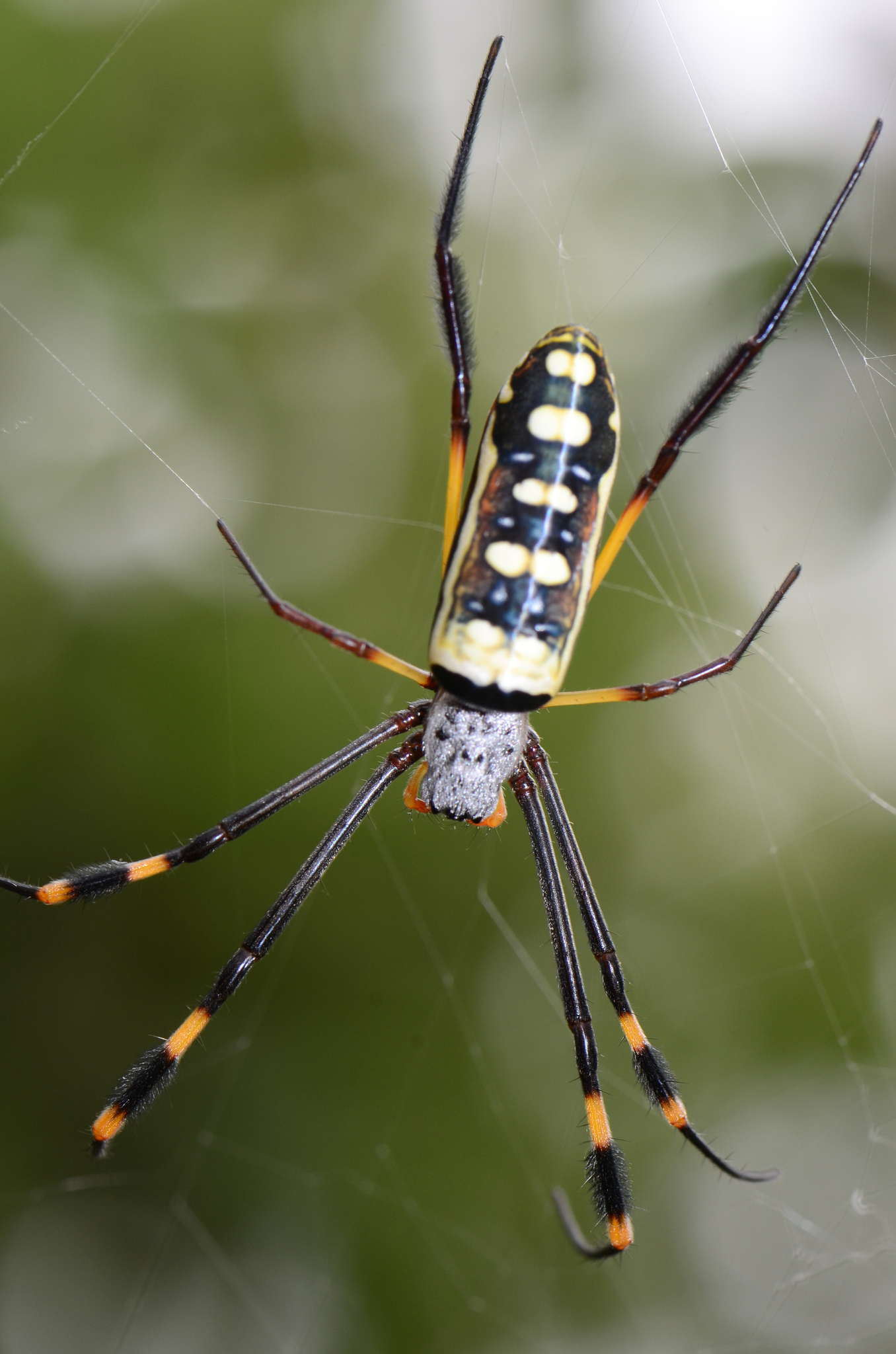
- Female
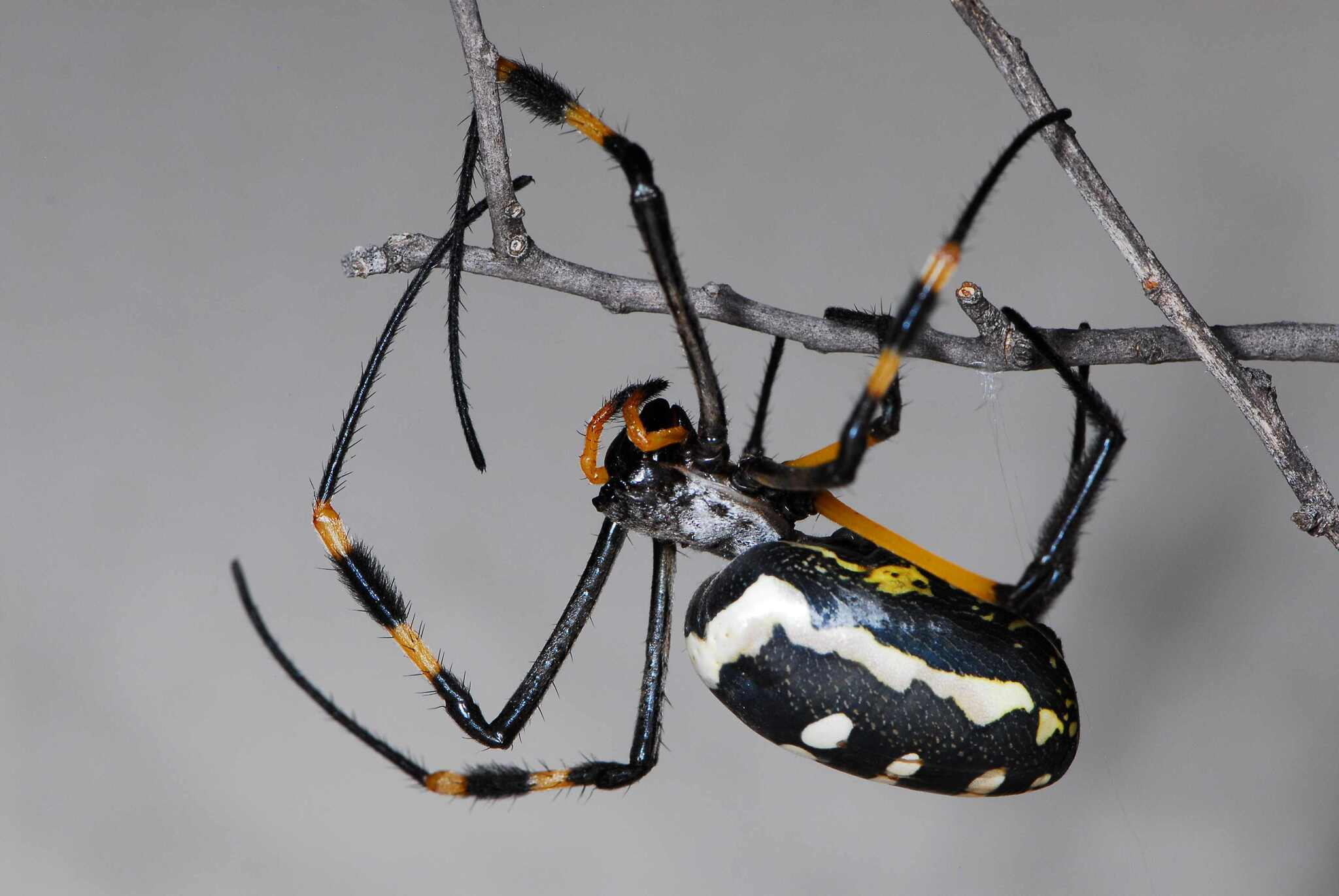
- Female

Scientific classification
- Kingdom: Animalia
- Phylum: Arthropoda
- Subphylum: Chelicerata
- Class: Arachnida
- Order: Araneae
- Infraorder: Araneomorphae
- Family: Nephilidae
- Genus: Trichonephila
- Species: T. senegalensis

Binomial name
- Trichonephila senegalensis (Walckenaer, 1841)

= Trichonephila senegalensis =

Banded-legged Golden Orb-Web Spider

Species of spider

Trichonephila senegalensis is a species of spider in the family Araneidae. It is an African endemic commonly known as the banded-legged golden orb-web spider.

== Distribution ==
T. senegalensis is found from West Africa to Ethiopia.

The subspecies Trichonephila senegalensis annulata is widespread throughout Africa. In South Africa, it is commonly found throughout the country in all nine provinces and occurs in more than 10 protected areas.

== Habitat and ecology ==
In South Africa, the species inhabits altitudes ranging from 16 to 1,864 m above sea level and has been sampled from all biomes except the Desert and Succulent Karoo biomes. Trichonephila senegalensis builds large (1-1.5 m in diameter) orb webs with a yellowish golden viscid spiral.

== Description ==
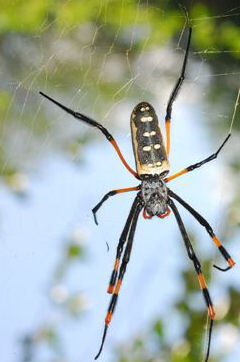
female

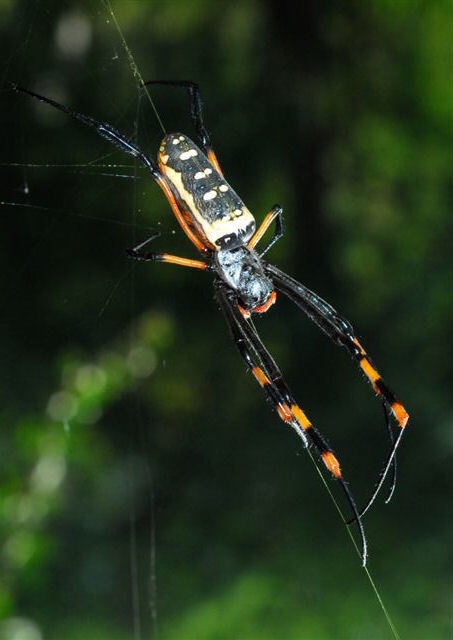
female

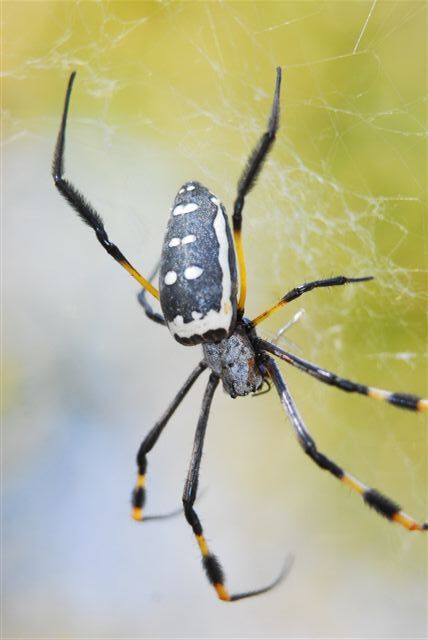
female

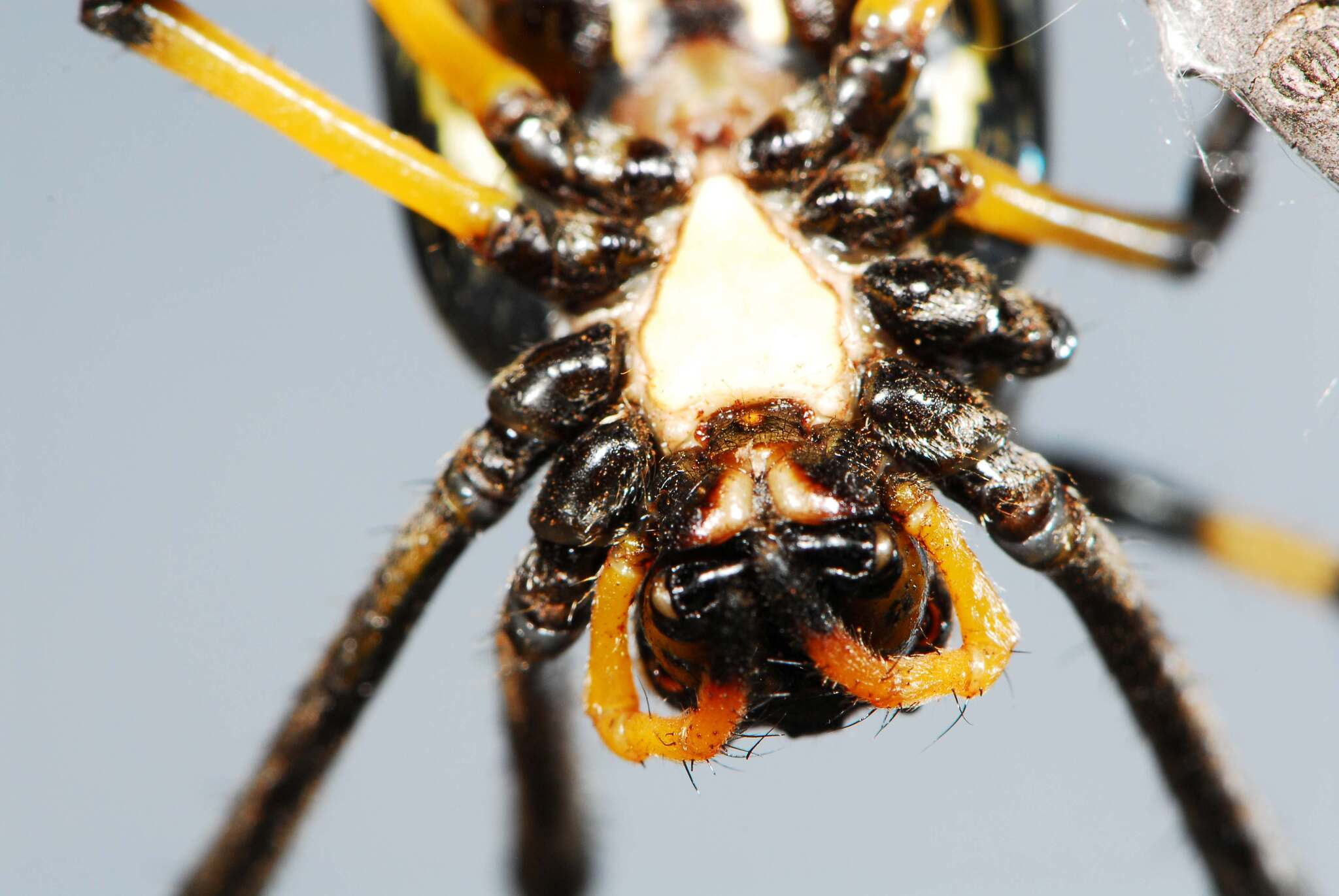
female

== Conservation ==
Trichonephila senegalensis annulata is listed as Least Concern by the South African National Biodiversity Institute due to its wide geographical range. The species is protected in more than 20 protected areas.

== Taxonomy ==
The species is known from both sexes.
