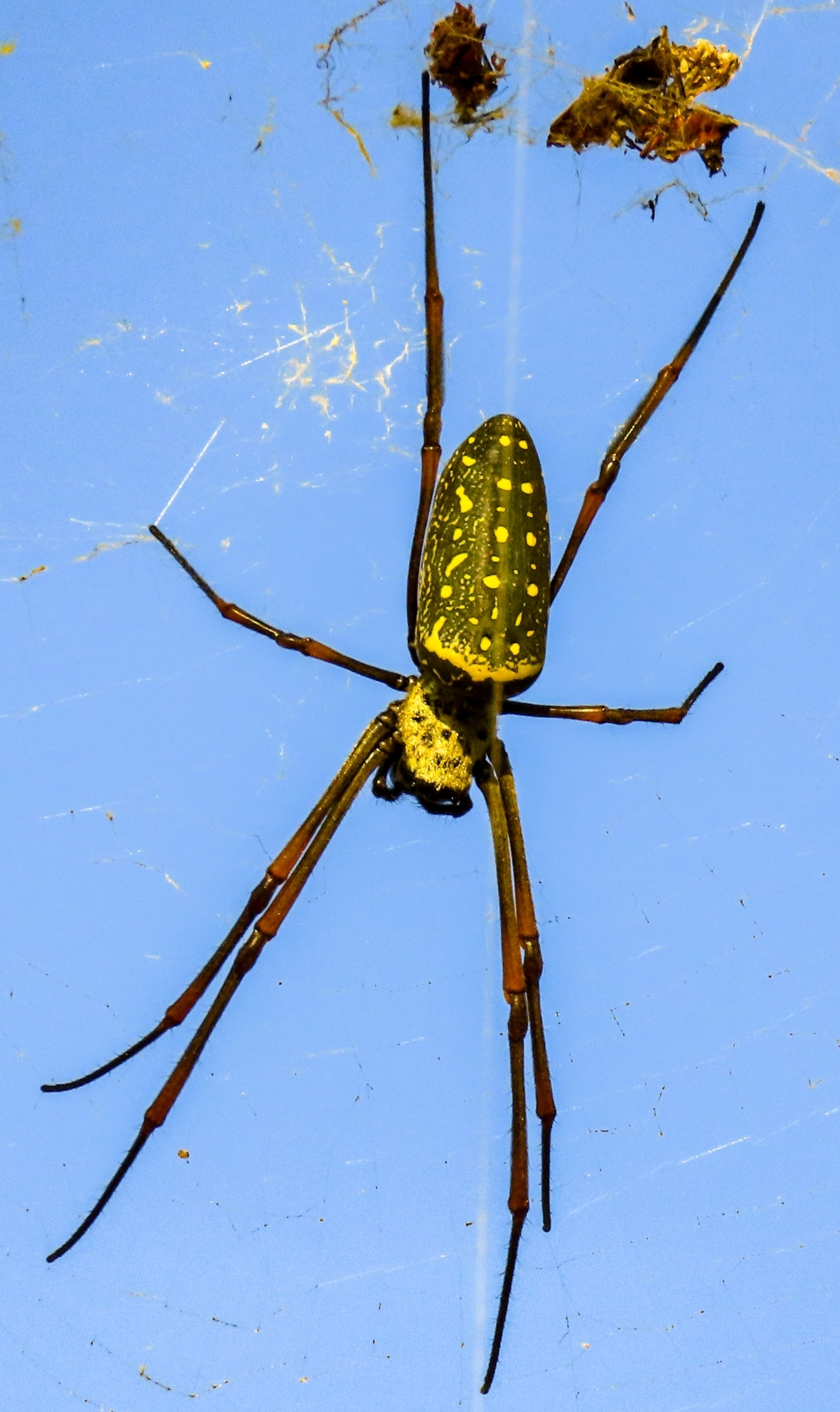
- female from Thailand

Scientific classification
- Kingdom: Animalia
- Phylum: Arthropoda
- Subphylum: Chelicerata
- Class: Arachnida
- Order: Araneae
- Infraorder: Araneomorphae
- Family: Nephilidae
- Genus: Trichonephila
- Species: T. antipodiana

Binomial name
- Trichonephila antipodiana (Walckenaer, 1841)

Synonyms
- Epeira antipodiana Walckenaer, 1841; Epeira imperialis Doleschall, 1857; Nephila ornata Blackwall, 1864; Nephila baeri Simon, 1877; Nephila holmerae Thorell, 1881; Nephila laurinae Thorell, 1881; Nephila ambigua Kulczyński, 1911; Nephila sarasinorum Merian, 1911; Nephila celebesiana Strand, 1915

= Trichonephila antipodiana =

Batik Golden Web Spider

Species of spider

Trichonephila antipodiana is a species of golden orb-weaver spider in the family Araneidae. Originally described by Charles Athanase Walckenaer in 1841 as Epeira antipodiana, the species was later transferred to Nephila and most recently to the genus Trichonephila in 2019.

== Etymology ==
The species name antipodiana refers to the Antipodes, reflecting its Southern Hemisphere distribution when first described.

== Taxonomy ==
The species has undergone extensive taxonomic revision, with numerous species being synonymized under T. antipodiana. The phylogenetic analysis by Kuntner et al. (2019) led to the reclassification of many Nephila species into the genus Trichonephila.

== Distribution ==
T. antipodiana is distributed across a wide range in the Indo-Pacific region, including China, Myanmar, the Philippines, Indonesia, Papua New Guinea, the Solomon Islands, and Australia (Queensland).

== Habitat ==
The species is most commonly found in gardens and the edges of mangrove swamps, being less likely to occur within dense forests.

== Description ==
Trichonephila antipodiana displays the pronounced sexual size dimorphism characteristic of golden orb-weavers.

=== Females ===
Adult females are substantially larger than males, with the cephalothorax measuring approximately 12 mm in length and 9 mm in width. The cephalothorax bears two prominent conical tubercles at its apex and is decorated with broad rounded tubercles. The eye region is notably wider than it is long, with the distance between the lateral eyes being greater than their distance from the anterior eyes.

The sternum features a sharp tubercle at its center and displays seven blunt reddish-brown spots arranged on the lateral margins and posterior area. The female opisthosoma measures about 26 mm in length and 11.5 mm in width, appearing rounded at the front and more pointed toward the rear. The abdomen shows considerable color variation but typically displays a tawny yellow background with distinctive white or pale markings.

The legs show a characteristic color pattern with the basal portions being paler (yellowish or reddish-brown) while the distal segments are notably darker, almost black. This creates a striking banded appearance that is particularly evident in the front legs.

=== Males ===
Males are dramatically smaller, measuring only 8-9 mm in total body length compared to females' 30+ mm. The male cephalothorax displays similar tuberculation but at a much reduced scale. Adult males show darker overall coloration, with the cephalothorax and leg segments often appearing more brownish-black than in females.

The male pedipalps are proportionally enlarged and bear complex copulatory structures. The palpal bulb contains the characteristic spiral sperm duct and associated structures necessary for sperm transfer during mating.

== Behavior and ecology ==
Like other golden orb-weavers, T. antipodiana constructs large, semi-permanent orb webs with golden-colored silk. The spider's silk contains pyrrolidine alkaloids that serve as chemical repellents to deter ants from the web.
