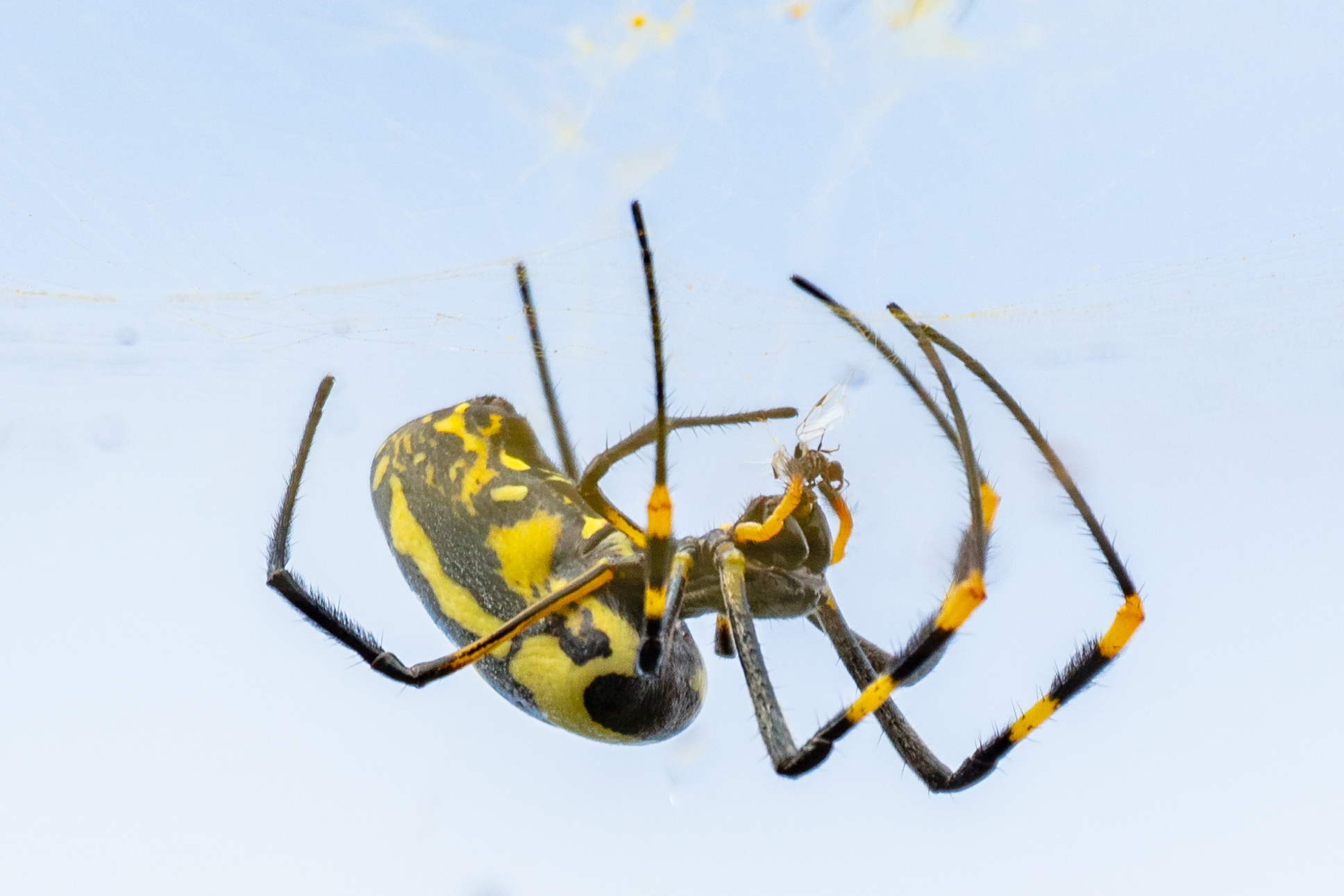
- female T. fenestrata from Kenya
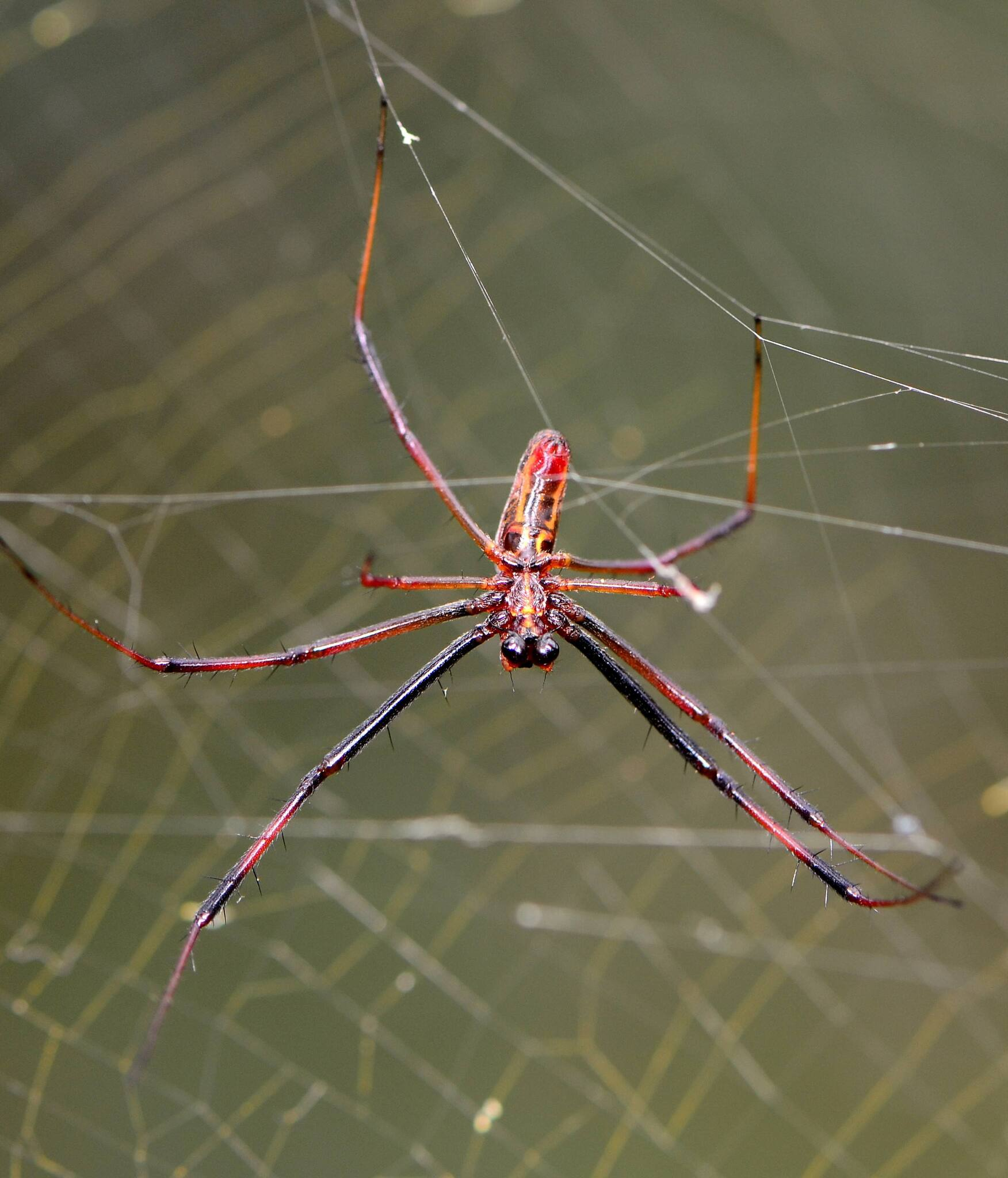
- male from South Africa

Scientific classification
- Kingdom: Animalia
- Phylum: Arthropoda
- Subphylum: Chelicerata
- Class: Arachnida
- Order: Araneae
- Infraorder: Araneomorphae
- Family: Nephilidae
- Genus: Trichonephila
- Species: T. fenestrata

Binomial name
- Trichonephila fenestrata (Thorell, 1859)

Synonyms
- Nephila fenestrata Thorell, 1859; Nephila pilipes fenestrata Strand, 1907; Nephila (Dasynephila) fenestrata Dahl, 1912

= Trichonephila fenestrata =

Black-legged Golden Orb-Web Spider

Species of spider

Trichonephila fenestrata is a southern African species of spider in the family Araneidae. It is commonly known as the black-legged golden orb-web spider.

== Distribution ==
Trichonephila fenestrata occurs in Eswatini, Lesotho, and South Africa. In South Africa, it is found in all provinces and occurs in more than 20 protected areas.

Three subspecies are known from different parts of Africa.

== Habitat and ecology ==
The species inhabits altitudes ranging from 0 to 1,795 m above sea level and has been sampled from all biomes except the Desert and Succulent Karoo biomes. Trichonephila fenestrata constructs large, complete golden yellow coloured orb webs between trees and shrubs. The species has also been sampled in citrus and prickly pear orchards.

Males of this species often autotomize their legs as a counter-adaptation to the sexual cannibalism of females.

== Description ==
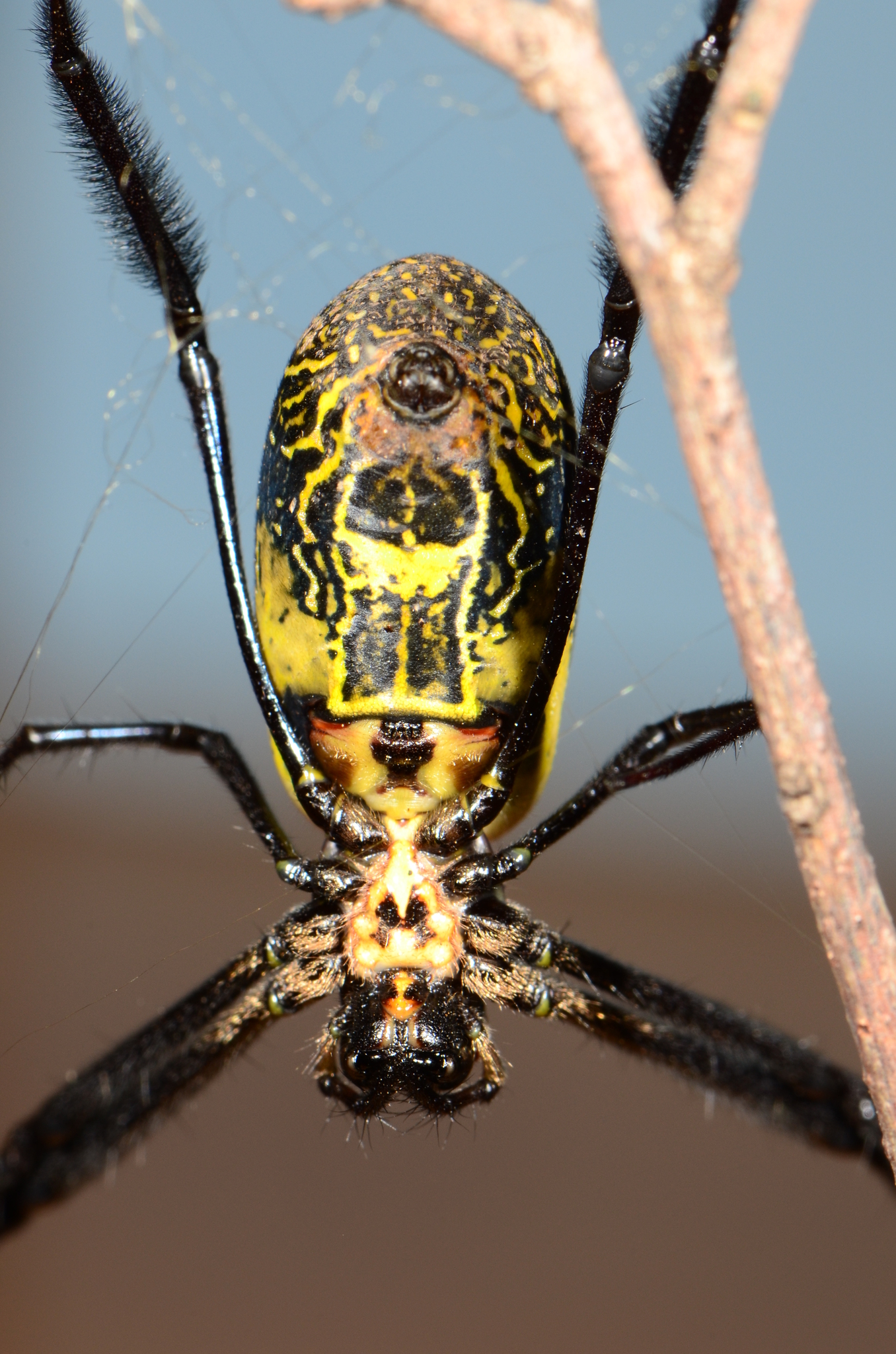
female

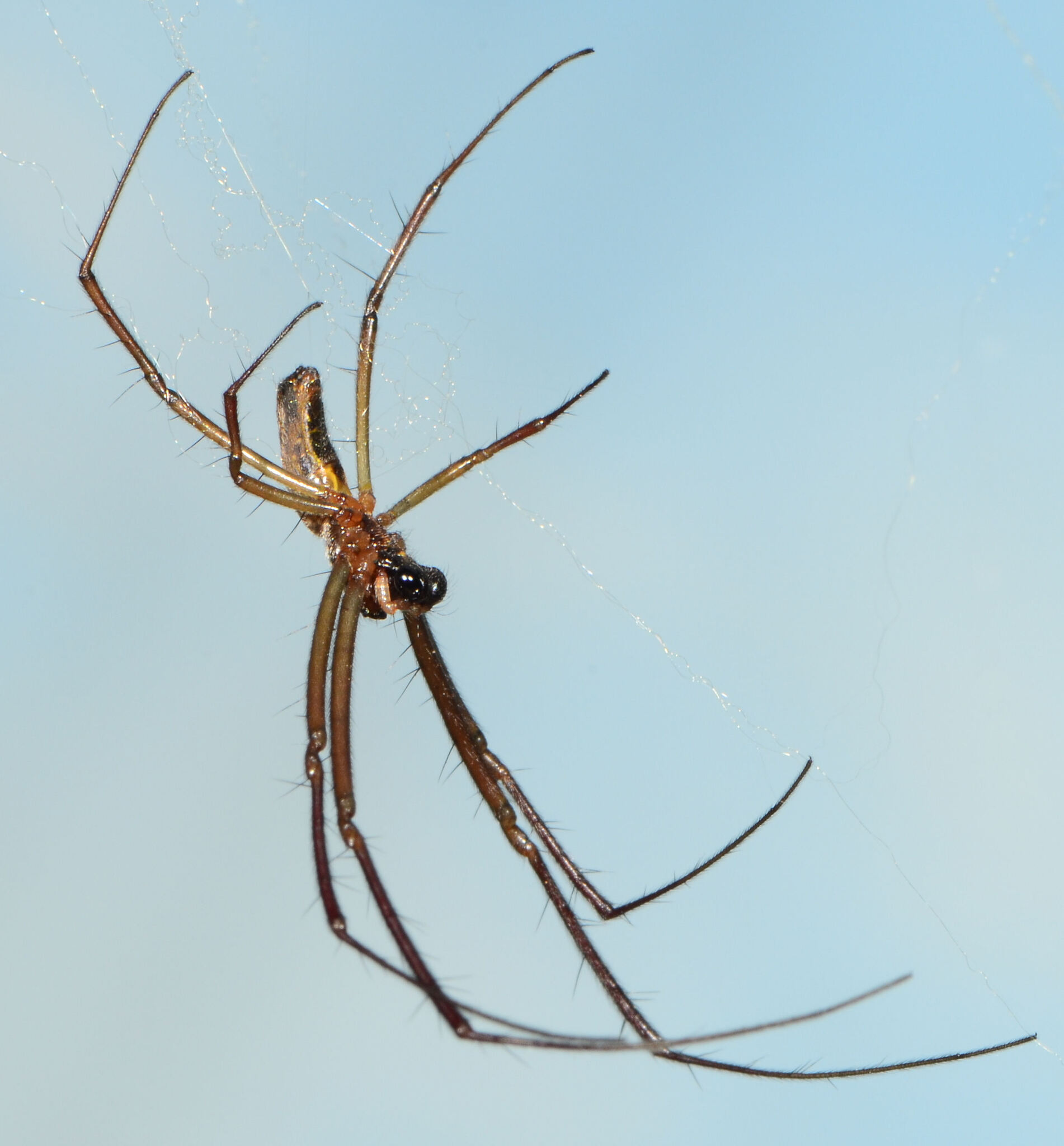
female

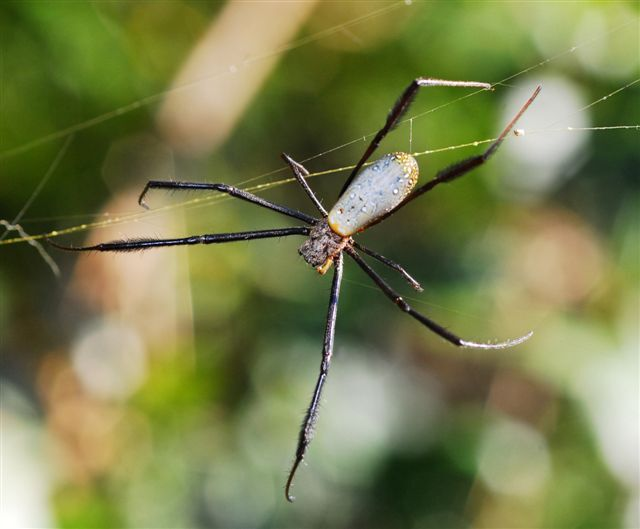
female

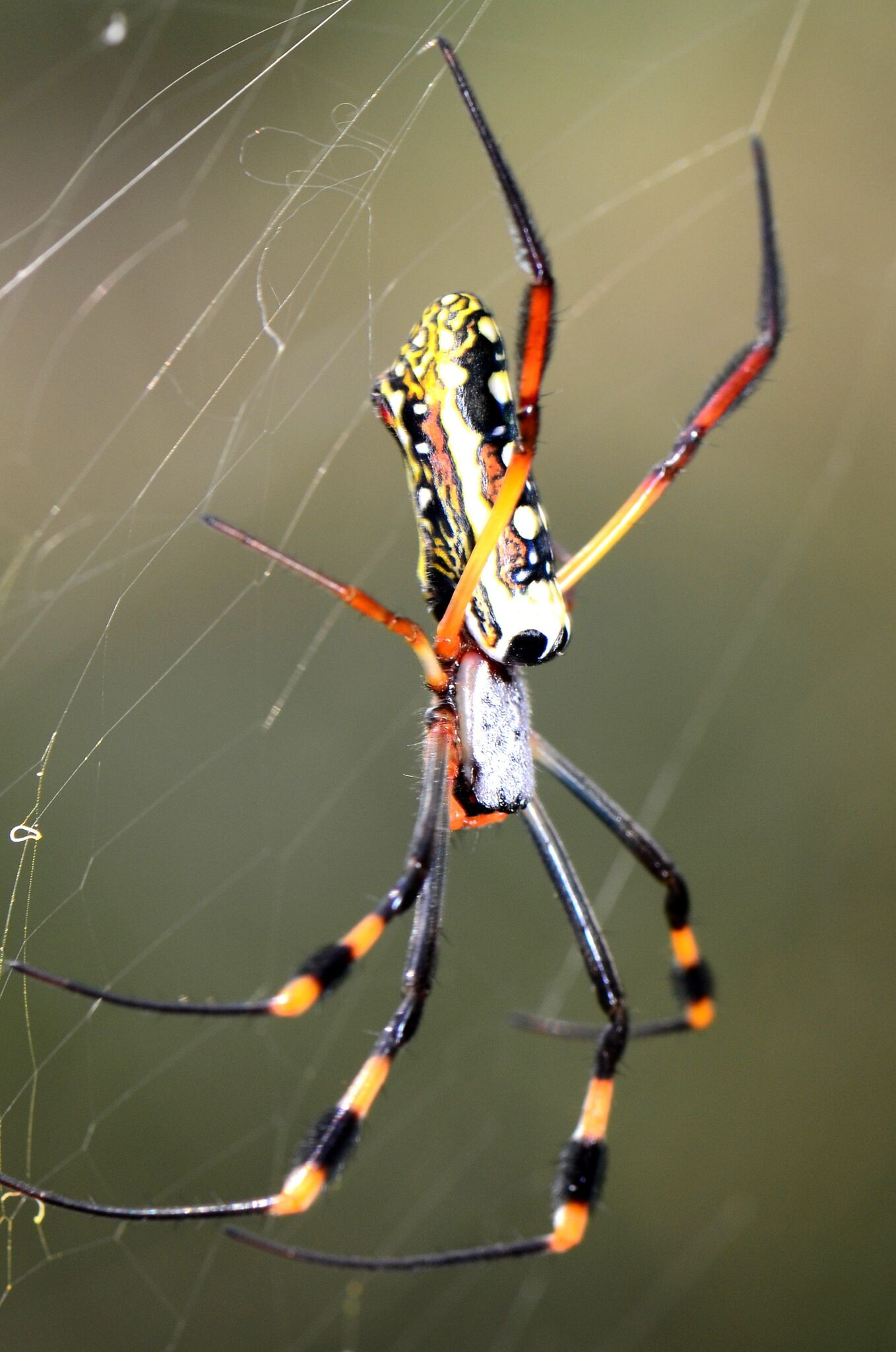
juvenile female

== Conservation ==
Trichonephila fenestrata is listed as Least Concern by the South African National Biodiversity Institute due to its wide range. The species is protected in more than 20 protected areas.

== Taxonomy ==
The species was originally described by Thorell in 1859 as Nephila fenestrata from Caffraria (old name for Eastern Cape). It was transferred to the genus Trichonephila by Kuntner et al. in 2019. The species is known from both sexes.
