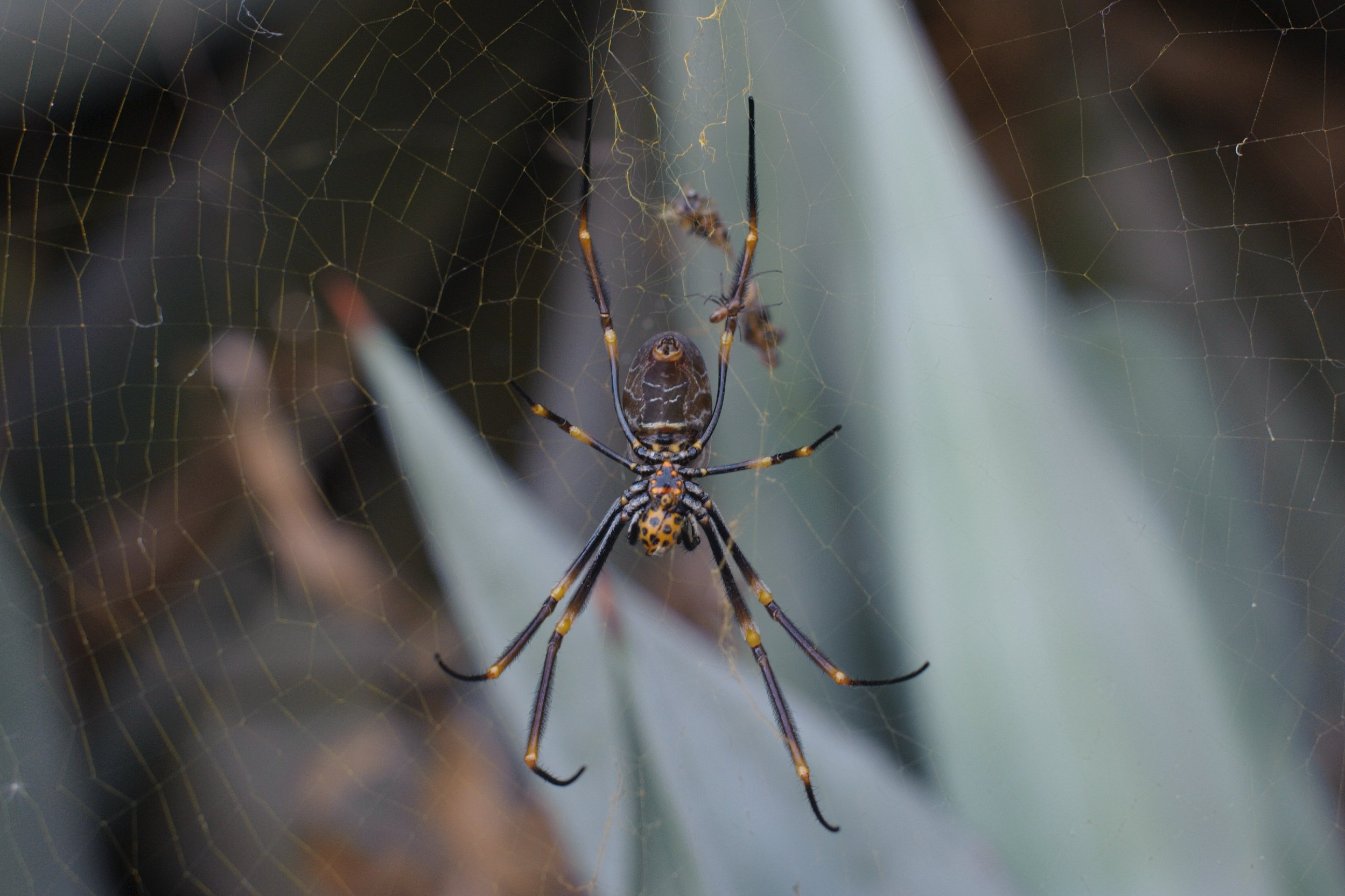
- Female eating an Asian Lady Beetle, with male in attendance

Conservation status
- Least Concern (IUCN 3.1)

Scientific classification
- Kingdom: Animalia
- Phylum: Arthropoda
- Subphylum: Chelicerata
- Class: Arachnida
- Order: Araneae
- Infraorder: Araneomorphae
- Family: Nephilidae
- Genus: Trichonephila
- Species: T. plumipes

Binomial name
- Trichonephila plumipes (Latreille, 1804)

Synonyms
- Nephila plumipes

= Trichonephila plumipes =

Species of spider

Trichonephila plumipes, the Pacific golden orb weaver, is a species of spider found in Australia, Indonesia and some Pacific Islands, which exhibits extreme sexual dimorphism through its sexual cannibalism behavior. It is sometimes called the tiger spider due to its markings which look similar to a tiger. This species was formerly called Nephila plumipes. As with other spiders from the genus Nephila, these spiders have a distinct golden web.

The Trichonephila plumipes benefits from highly urbanized places due to more available food, warmer temperatures, and fewer predators. This species is commonly found in urban and natural landscapes.

T. plumipes is most commonly found in Australia, Indonesia, New Guinea, Solomon Islands, Vanuatu, New Ireland and New Caledonia.

== Description ==
T. plumipes resembles most of the other members of this genus in the general body form. Females of the T. plumipes species resemble those of T. clavipes in that they possess a collection of stiff hair on their legs. However, the hairs of T. plumipes are more closely set together than those of T. clavipes. In a T. plumipes female, the cephalothorax is black, covered with silver-colored hairs. The abdomen is olive-brown with yellow and white spots and stripes. On several pairs of its legs, there are brushes of stiff black hairs. The body of the males are dark brown. The legs are dark brown as well, with a few scattering black hairs, without the brushes that are present in the female.

=== Sexual dimorphism ===
T. plumipes is a large spider. Females can achieve a body length of 34mm, while males are smaller and rarely exceed 5mm in body length. Males can be less than one-tenth the size of females. Some males may weigh less than 1% of the body weight of mature females. The extreme sexual size dimorphism of T. plumipes is the result of selection due to the females' predisposition to engage in pre-copulation sexual cannibalism. The smaller-sized males may better evade pre-copulation sexual cannibalism because of the female T. plumipes inability to detect these smaller males and thus this smaller size is selected for.

=== Large variation in male size ===
There is a large variance value in male body size, indicating that although a smaller body may evade pre-copulation sexual cannibalism, there still exists benefits to larger body sizes. The variance in male body size of T. plumipes is 44.4, twice that of other male spiders of similarly sized species. This is because smaller males are less likely to be detected and cannibalized by females before copulation, but larger males can exclude small males from the central hub of the web where mating takes place. Smaller males pay the cost of getting fewer mating opportunities and being replaced by larger males. The conflicting effects of pre-copulation sexual cannibalism and male-male competition results in the large variation in male size.

== Population structure, speciation, and phylogeny ==
Twelve Trichonephila species have had taxonomic changes. These twelve Trichonephila species were all formerly in classical Nephila, but phylogenetic results have established the classical Nephila as diphyletic. Because classical Nephila is diphyletic, the new Nephila genus now only includes the Australasian N. pilipes and the African N. constricta. The remaining twelve species, including T. plumipes, were assigned to the circumtropical Trichonephila. Thus, Nephila plumipes is the synonym of Trichonephila plumipes. The divergence between N. pilipes, the N. constricta clade, and the other new Trichonephila species is dated 11.9 Mya. The subsequent diversification for the separation of T. plumipes and other Asian/Australian Trichonephila species was dated 10.9 million years ago.

== Habitat and distribution ==
=== Urbanization ===
T. plumipes reaches high densities in Sydney, Australia. T. plumipes has previously been shown to have positive response to urban landscapes. This urban-exploiting species benefits from multiple factors in cities. A study shows that T. plumipes were found to persist longer at sites with more concrete surfaces and less vegetation cover. Increases in concrete surfaces and decreases in vegetation cover can drive the urban heat island effect, which is a result of urban areas being warmer than rural areas due to human activity. In these warmer conditions, T. plumipes' orb weaver season is extended. Normally, T. plumipes juveniles overwinter in egg sacs, hatch in the spring, and mature in the summer. However, in warmer winters, females can produce eggs faster, and the egg sacs can hatch within the same season, instead of remaining dormant in the winter. In this way, T. plumipes can complete two life cycles in the same season. This results in higher fitness and increased success for T. plumipes in urban areas. Another factor of the T. plumipes success in urban regions is the abundance of prey. There are more large prey in urban microhabitats due to urban warming, artificial night lightings, and the loss of predators. Food resources play a big role in the increased survival of T. plumipes in urban areas.

== Webs ==
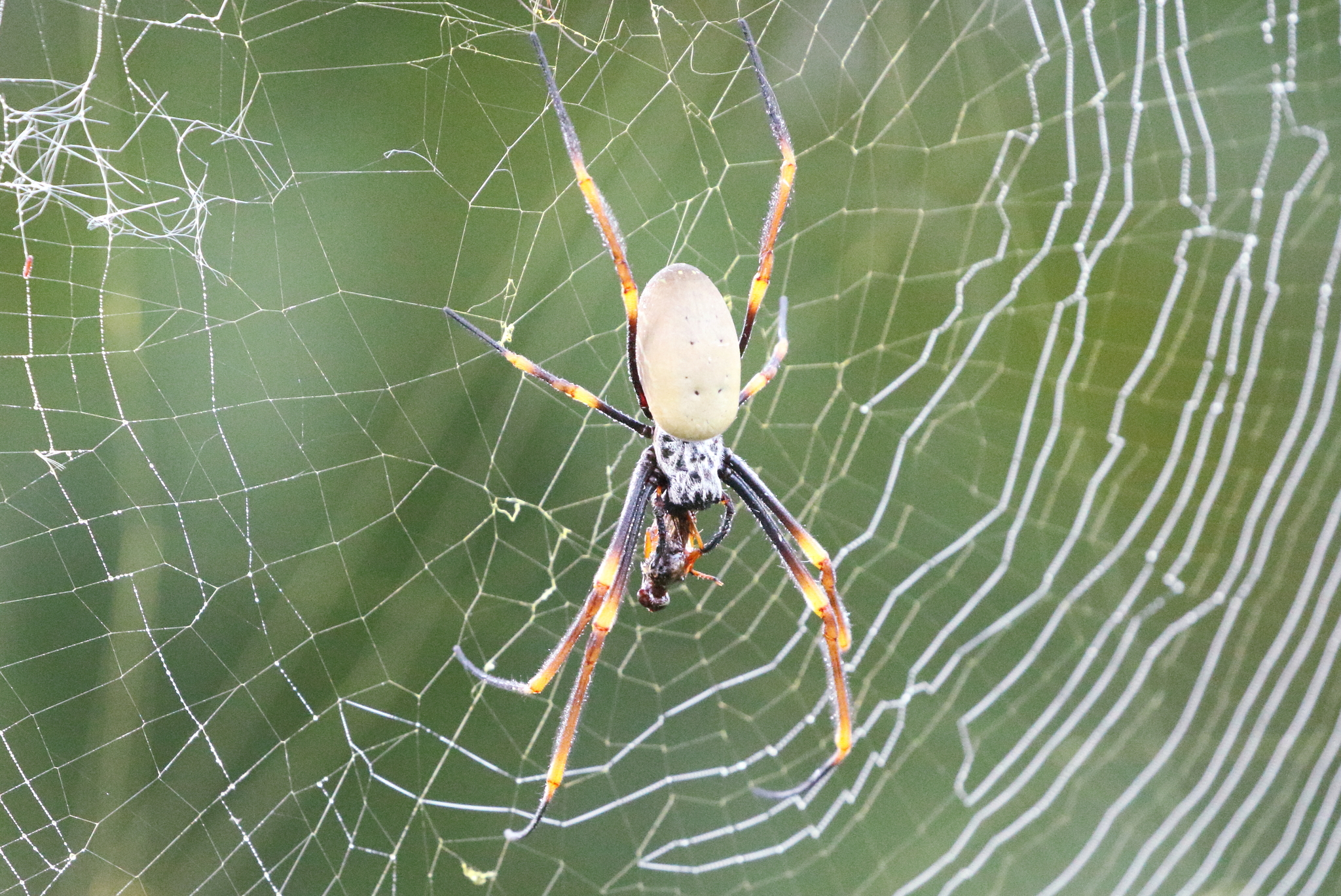
Trichonephila plumipes on its web.

=== Prey capture techniques ===
T. plumipes spins a relatively permanent web. They capture most of their prey during the day. This diurnal preying schedule is due to the fact that T. plumipes captures mostly Hymenoptera, which are more abundant during the day than the night. Both sexes build webs for prey capture. The size of the web and the web location affects resource acquisition.

=== Silk color ===
The silks produced by T. plumipes could be classified as both bee visible and bee invisible. The bee visible silks appear yellow or golden to the human eye, while the bee invisible silks are white/silver to the human eye. The colors of the silk are not related to spider's protein intake. The yellow coloration of T. plumipes silk is not due to carotinoid intake from the food. The silk colors are correlated with silk thermal properties rather than silk protein structure. The conspicuous yellow coloration of T. plumipes silk is selectively attractive to certain prey species, but it might also attract the predators. The yellow and white coloration of T. plumipes silk might be the result of trade-offs between prey and predator attraction. The balance of this trade-off determines if T. plumipes silk is visible to bees or not.

=== Food storage ===
T. plumipes incorporate prey they previously captured into their webs. They apply a long-term storage mechanism. They incorporate a densely packed storage band of previously captured uneaten prey into their web that is attached to the barrier web near the hub. They can maintain their body mass when there is low level of prey capture by eating the stored items. T. plumipes incorporate only animal material in their storage, but some other species in the Trichonephila genus utilize plant material in the storage serving some unidentified non-food-storing functions. A disadvantage of hoarding behavior is that the prey items stored may be lost to kleptoparasites or through web damage. Spiders in the genus Trichonephila are often host to kleptoparasitic spiders. Food storage in the web can attract more kleptoparasites. However, a study showed that the abundance of kleptoparasites does not affect T. plumipes weight gain. Kleptoparasites feed on prey items ignored by the host spider, which does not affect the nutrients intake of the host spider.

== Mating ==
=== Mate searching behavior ===
Upon maturity, T. plumipes males leave their natal webs to search for females' webs. Females' webs are used for mate attraction and are also used as the mating arena. Females produce web-based, long-distance cuticular pheromones for males to locate them. Multiple males can settle on a single female's web and wait for an opportunity to mate. In T. plumipes, females are polygynous, while males are monogynous due to a high chance of injury and sexual cannibalism by their first mate. Male survival during mate searching is extremely low at 36%. The high mortality rate is due to males' increased search time. Factors such as encountering predators and depleting energy reserves decrease male survival during mate searching. T. plumipes males have a long mate search time. Since they have only one single opportunity to mate, they are choosy. A male's mate choice is based on their own condition and weight. Males that choose virgin females are heavier than those that choose mated females. Thus, males are choosy about female phenotype or mating status, taking their own factors into consideration. As a result, males travel further than necessary, roughly eight meters, to find preferred mates.

=== Sexual cannibalism ===
T. plumipes females cannibalize males both before and during copulation. In T. plumipes, although cannibalized males copulate for longer than the males that escape, they do not transfer more sperm. But males who mate with mated females transfer more sperm than the ones who mate with virgin females. Males benefit from sexual cannibalism because of higher fertilization success. Males that survive copulation with mated females do not sire more than 30% of the clutch, but if he is cannibalized, this value is doubled. Females benefit from sexual cannibalism by gaining more nutrients. Virgin females that are small in size and in poor condition are more likely to cannibalize males. For pre-copulation sexual cannibalism, female T. plumipes are less likely to capture small males over large males. This might occur because females cannot detect them. But after copulation starts, females always want to cannibalize, regardless of the males' size.

== Social behavior ==
=== Group living ===
T. plumipes settles both solitarily and aggregates with neighbors. Although the females have their own web, they have a tendency to settle nearby one another and create aggregations. Females can switch between solitary and aggregative settlement as the breeding season progresses. The large aggregations have as many as ten webs that either share structural threads or are found within 20 cm of another web. The female aggregations consist of females of different ages and mating statuses, ranging from juveniles to mated adults. Female settlement decisions are determined by various factors including the presence of predators, kleptoparasites, availability of prey, benefits of group prey capture, and social factors such as population density. A study confirmed the "hotshot hypothesis" of female aggregation formation in T. plumipes - the largest females attract the most males, and other females join the most attractive ones and form aggregations to increase their chances of attracting males. Smaller females are more likely to join other aggregations that are already established by larger females. The "preference model" is similarly supported with males showing preference for larger aggregations of females. Males settle within a larger aggregation because the distances between alternative females are minimized, allowing males to more easily and readily access potential females for mating. Due to the closely clustered nature of aggregations, the cost of searching for mates for males is reduced in a female aggregation.

== Physiology ==
=== Locomotion ===
Maximum running speed and maximum climbing speed are positively related in T. plumipes. Spiders who are good runners are also good climbers. Climbing and running represent a single locomotive performance characteristic of T. plumipes. High performance in each might be promoted by the same morphological and physiological characteristics. There is no evidence of trade-off between fast running speeds and fast climbing speeds in T. plumipes.
