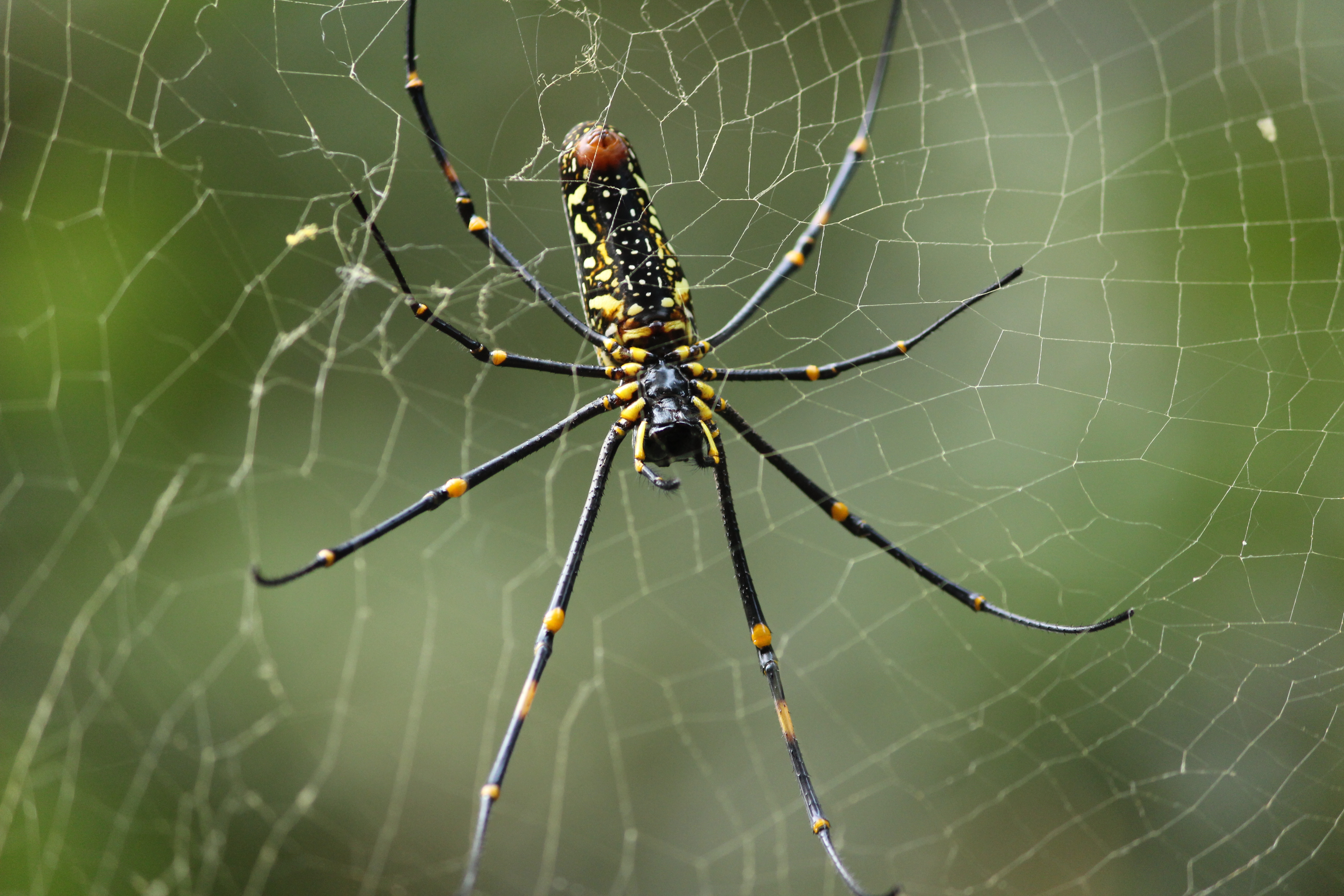
- Ventral side of N. pilipes, Agumbe Rainforest, India

Scientific classification
- Kingdom: Animalia
- Phylum: Arthropoda
- Subphylum: Chelicerata
- Class: Arachnida
- Order: Araneae
- Infraorder: Araneomorphae
- Family: Nephilidae
- Genus: Nephila; Leach, 1815

Type species
- Aranea pilipes Fabricius, 1793

Species
- See text

Diversity
- 7 species

= Nephila =

Golden silk orb-weaver Temporal range: Ypresian–present

Genus of spiders

Nephila is a genus of araneomorph spiders noted for the impressive webs they weave. Nephila consists of numerous species found in warmer regions around the world, although some species formerly included in the genus have been moved to Trichonephila. They are commonly called golden silk orb-weavers, golden orb-weavers, giant wood spiders, or banana spiders.

== Etymology ==
The genus name Nephila is derived from Ancient Greek, meaning 'fond of spinning', from the words νεῖν (nein) = to spin (related to nema νήμα "thread") + φίλος (philos) = "love".

== Description ==
Nephila spiders vary from reddish to greenish yellow in color with distinctive whiteness on the cephalothorax and the beginning of the abdomen. Like many species of the superfamily Araneoidea, most of them have striped legs specialized for weaving (where their tips point inward, rather than outward as is the case with many wandering spiders). Their contrast of dark brown/black and green/yellow allows warning and repelling of potential predators to which their venom might be of little danger.

Golden orb-weavers reach sizes of 4.8–5.1 cm (1.9–2.0 in) in females, not including legspan, with males being usually two-thirds smaller (less than 2.5 cm, 1 in). In 2012, a large individual was photographed killing and consuming a 0.5-m-long brown tree snake in Freshwater, Queensland. Species from Taiwan have been known to reach over 130 mm (5.1 in), legspan included, in mountainous country. In 2014, a study discovered that golden orb-weavers living in urban areas, particularly areas of a high socioeconomic status, grew larger and carried more eggs than those in their native habitats. A number of possible explanations were suggested, such as increased food supplies due to artificial light or lack of predators and parasites.

== Species ==
In 2018, twelve Nephila species were reclassified as Trichonephila, with another two (N. kuhlii and N. robusta) considered in 2020 to be junior synonyms of N. pilipes. Species whose placement has been changed by some sources include:

- Nephila laurinae was considered to be a synonym of Trichonephila antipodiana ("Batik Golden Web Spider"), found most commonly in the Philippines and Vietnam
- Trichonephila komaci, found most commonly in South Africa and Madagascar, transferred from Nephila komaci
- Trichonephila clavipes (or "banana spider") found widely in warmer parts of the Americas, transferred from Nephila clavipes
- Trichonephila inaurata (or "red-legged golden orb-weaver spider") found most commonly in southern and East Africa, transferred from Nephila inaurata
- Trichonephila plumipes (or "tiger spider") found most commonly in Australia, transferred from Nephila plumipes

As of November 2026, the World Spider Catalog does not accept all of these changes, listing the following species in the genus Nephila:

- Nephila comorana Strand, 1916 – Comoros, Mayotte
- Nephila constricta Karsch, 1879 – Tropical Africa
- Nephila cornuta (Pallas, 1772) – Guyana
- Nephila kuhli (Doleschall, 1859) – Myanmar to Indonesia
- Nephila pakistaniensis Ghafoor & Beg, 2002 – Pakistan
- Nephila pilipes (Fabricius, 1793) (type) – Pakistan, India to China, Vietnam, Philippines, Australia
- Nephila tetragnathoides (Walckenaer, 1841) – Fiji, Tonga, Niue

Additional fossil species are known from the Cenozoic. In 2012 Geratonephila burmanica was described from the Cenomanian aged Burmese amber, Wunderlich 2015 synonymised Geratonephilia with Nephilia tenuis, a species from the Dominican Amber, as he considered it unlikely that the amber was actually Burmese in origin. Though largely ambiguous, the origins of Nephila are undoubtedly Gondowanan. With the prime candidates being Africa, Indomalaya, and Australasia.

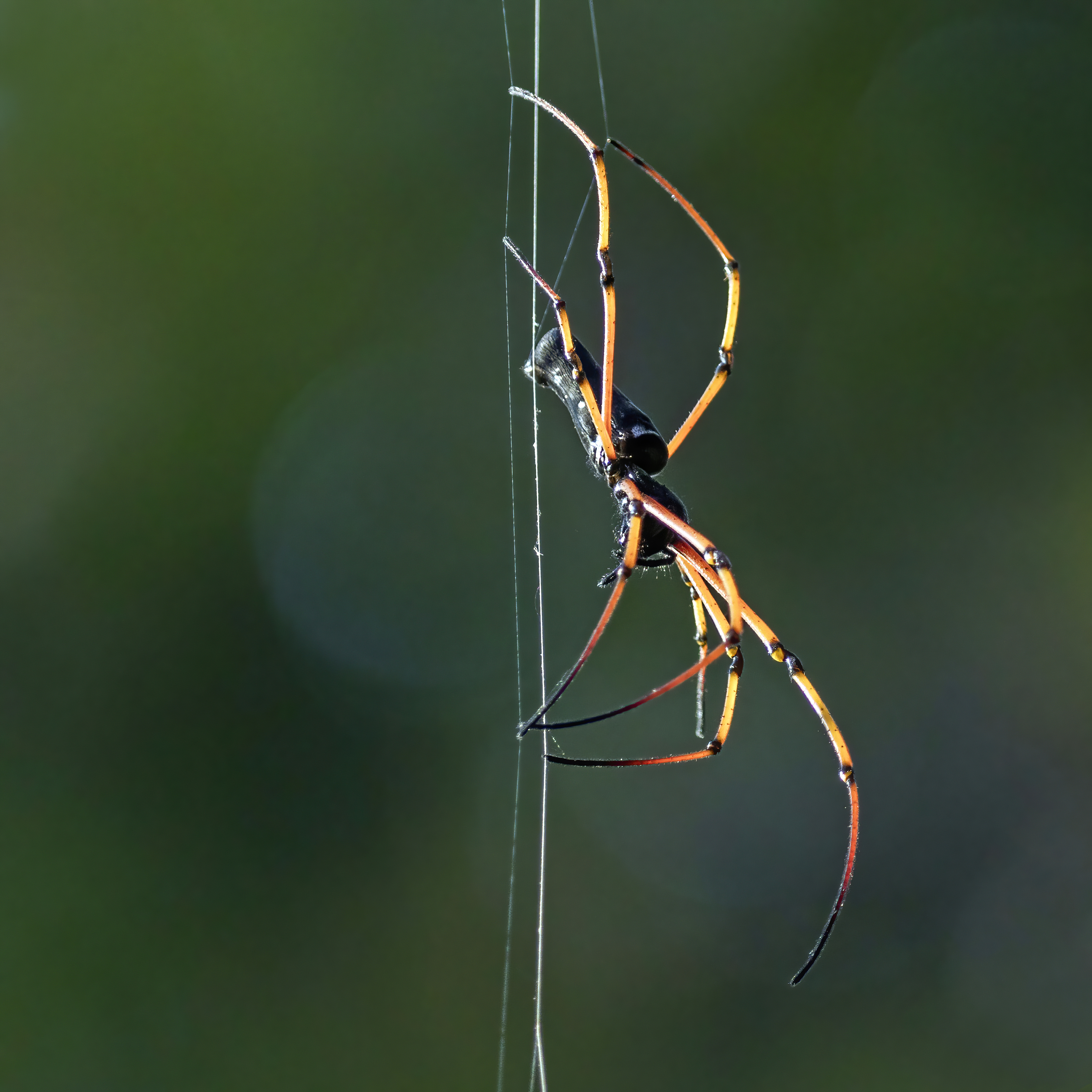
N. kuhlii dorsal side

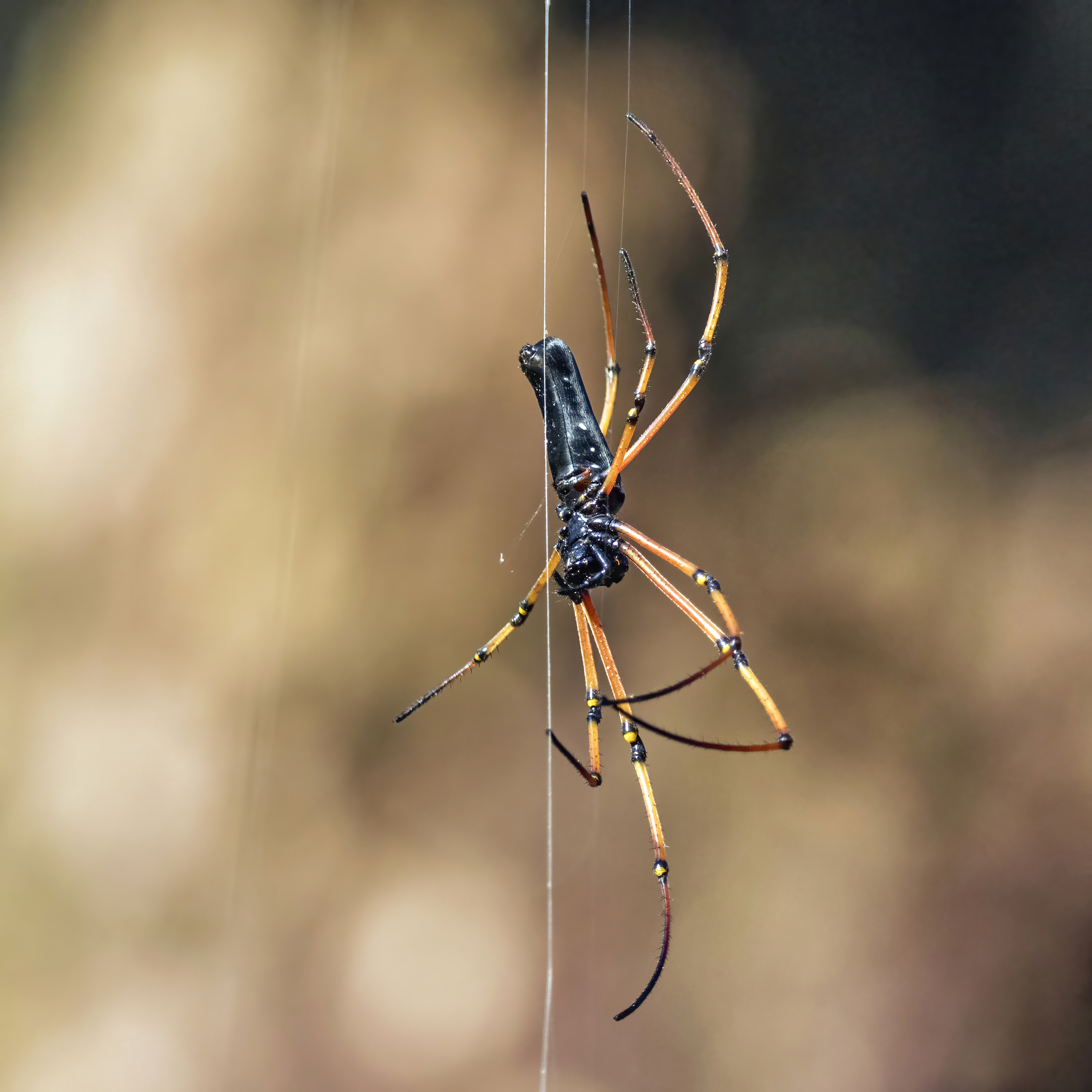
N. kuhlii ventral side

== Distribution and habitat ==
Golden silk orb-weavers are widespread in warmer regions throughout the world, with species in Australia, Asia, Africa (including Madagascar), and the Americas. Spiderlings can be carried by the wind over long distances, and each year, a small number of female golden orb web spiders are found in New Zealand (where they are not endemic) after having been blown across the Tasman Sea; the spiders usually end up in the North Island.

Whilst the geographic distribution of Nephila is large, many habitat similarities are seen between these locations. A warm and reasonably wet climate is generally preferred, as these are some of the environmental cues that induce spiderling hatching. Locally, spiders look for relatively dense vegetation where webs can be set up in areas that insects will regularly fly through. Urban environments are also attractive due to the large prey concentrations and lower levels of predation.

== Behavior ==
=== Web spinning and structure ===
Nephila spiders produce large asymmetric orb webs up to 1.5 m (5 ft) in diameter. Nephila species remain in their webs permanently, so have a higher predation risk. The golden silk orb-weaver is named for the yellow color of the spider silk used to construct these webs.

Yellow threads of their web shine like gold in sunlight. Carotenoids are the main contributors to this yellow color, but xanthurenic acid, two quinones, and an unknown compound may also aid in the color. Experimental evidence suggests that the silk's color may serve a dual purpose: sunlit webs ensnare bees that are attracted to the bright yellow strands, whereas in shady spots, the yellow blends in with background foliage to act as a camouflage. The spider is able to adjust pigment intensity relative to background light levels and color; the range of spectral reflectance is specifically adapted to insect vision.

The webs of most Nephila spiders are complex, with a fine-meshed orb suspended in a maze of non-sticky barrier webs. As with many weavers of sticky spirals, the orb is renewed regularly if not daily, apparently because the stickiness of the orb declines with age. When weather is good (and no rain has damaged the orb web), subadults and adults often rebuild only a portion of the web. The spider removes and consumes the portion to be replaced, builds new radial elements, then spins the new spirals. This partial orb renewal is distinct from other orb-weaving spiders that usually replace the entire orb web. The web of Nephila antipodiana contains ant-repellent chemicals to protect the web.

Typically, the golden orb-weaver first weaves a nonsticky spiral with space for two to 20 more spirals in between (the density of sticky spiral strands decreases with increasing spider size). When she has completed the coarse weaving, she returns and fills in the gaps. Whereas most orb-weaving spiders remove the nonsticky spiral when spinning the sticky spiral, Nephila spiders leave it. This produces a "manuscript paper" effect when the orb is seen in the sun: groups of sticky spirals reflecting light with "gaps" where the nonsticky spiral does not reflect the light.

In relation to the ground, the webs of adults may be woven from eye-level upwards high into the tree canopy. The orb web is usually truncated by a top horizontal support strand, giving it an incomplete look.

Adjacent to one face of the main orb, a rather extensive and haphazard-looking network of guard-strands may be suspended a few centimeters distant across a free space. This network is often decorated with a lumpy string or two of plant detritus and insect carcasses clumped with silk. This "barrier web" may function as a kind of early-warning system for incoming prey or against spider-hunting predators, or as a shield against windblown leaves; it may also be remnants of the owner's previous web. At least one reference explains the suspended debris-chain as a cue for birds to avoid blundering into and destroying the web.

=== Prey capture and feeding ===
The golden silk orb-weaver targets many different organisms as prey, ranging from small flies and beetles to larger cicadas and locusts. As a result of their strong web structure, small birds and bats can also become trapped and fed upon. Whilst most of the captured prey is relatively small compared to Nephila, the majority of biomass consumed comes from larger, rarer prey. Prey larger than 66% of the captor's size accounts for just 16.5% of prey captured, but 85% of prey consumed, indicating the spider is selective in its feeding habits.

Spiders are notified that potential prey has been caught in the web through vibrations along strands, and these can be followed to the prey location on the web and be used to estimate prey size.

Nephila species also create caches of food for storage, which can be found above the hub of the web and contain up to 15 prey items. These items are arranged in a line vertically and are wrapped in silk to reduce dehydration. Caches are created and grow when prey is readily available and more biomass is available for consumption than is required by the spider. The purpose of caches is to have a backup food source when prey is scarce and occasionally to provide bait to attract more prey to the web. Nephila species may also respond to food shortages by moving their webs, but this is a response to longer periods of prey scarcity than cache creation. Web moving is seen as a result of environmental change, whereas caches occur from environmental fluctuation.

=== Mating and reproduction ===
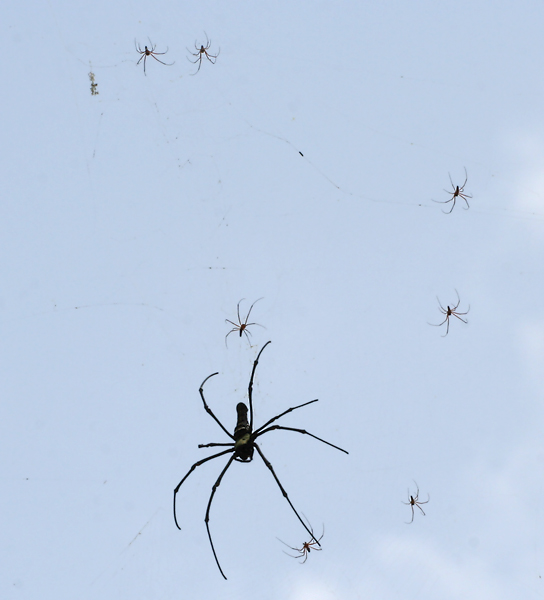
N. pilipes female with many males

Nephila spiders display large sexual dimorphism in size, with females being greatly larger than males. Debate exists as to whether this is a result of male dwarfism or female gigantism. Smaller males may be selected for due to the presence of competition for mating. Smaller males are quicker and more nimble, allowing them to be able to catch the females more easily, as well as to escape when threatened. Larger males may have to wait for the female to come close due to their slower speed. Larger females may have been selected for as a result of males using mating plugs upon copulation. Larger individuals reduce the success of these plugs, allowing for multiple mating and reducing the risk of genital mutilation. Gigantism in females is also associated with fecundity, as larger individuals can produce more eggs and therefore increase reproductive success.

When males are fully mature, they leave their webs to search for a suitable female, often using web characteristics to identify potential mates. Often, multiple males attempt to court the same female, thus competition for territory on the web occurs, but is rarely physical, as smaller males surrender area to larger ones. When males approach females, they are often feeding, allowing the males to get closer without an aggressive response and also meaning the female is not moving. On approach, the male makes himself known by tapping on a web strand to ensure the female is amenable before proceeding to mate. When met with aggression, males stop approaching and remain in the same location until the female relaxes or they retreat. Females engage in multiple mating, but no benefit to the offspring occurs as a result of this; however, the energy cost of repelling a male is higher than that of allowing him to copulate. As a result of this, sperm competition occurs through males altering the duration and frequency of mating, with longer mating being proportional to a greater likelihood of success. Sexual cannibalism is uncommon in Nephila as a result of male mating behaviours. By copulating when females are immobile after molting or inactive due to feeding, the males increase their chances of survival. Males also approach from the side of the web opposite the female, increasing the odds of a successful approach. Male Nephila pilipes is reported to have a mate binding behavior to avoid sexual cannibalism. Sexual cannibalism does still occur, but generally is more common with larger males, and from older females.

Females produce an egg sac in the surrounding environs of the web to protect their eggs. The eggs are deposited on a silk platform, then are covered in loose silk to form a sac, which is firmly attached to surrounding vegetation so that it is hidden from the view of predators. It is reported that egg sacs are mostly under leaves and other coverings. However, only Nephila pilipes is different than other Nephila species. They lay eggs in small pits on the ground to avoid parasitism. These sacs can contain from 300 to 3000 eggs, depending on mating success and particular species. Once hatched, the spiderlings inhabit a communal web to begin their lives.

=== Thermoregulation ===
Nephila spiders change their body positioning relative to the sun to maintain internal temperatures at an optimal level. As ambient temperatures increase, the spiders position themselves so the abdomen shades the cephalothorax from the sun. Spiders may also hang from their hind legs as a result of the heat due to a loss of hydrostatic pressure. Conversely, as temperatures cool down, the spiders position themselves perpendicular to the sun to retain as much heat energy as possible. When ambient temperatures reach extreme highs (above 40 °C), they may leave their webs and seek shade in the surrounding environment.

=== Predation and parasitism ===
Predation of Nephila species is relatively uncommon; when it does occur, the main group affected are the juvenile individuals. The major predators are birds, but wasps and damselflies also prey upon smaller juveniles.

Nephila species are frequently parasitized by Argyrodes, a genus of very small black-and-silver spiders that are kleptoparasitic. As many as a few dozen may infest a single Nephila web to feed from the host spider's captured prey. The frequent rebuilding or abandoning of webs by Nephila may be a tactic for controlling Argyrodes. Spiny orb-weaver spiders of the genus Gasteracantha also inhabit the webs of Nephila as kleptoparasites.

Egg sacs generally remain free from both predation and parasitism, often due to the close proximity of the mother and how well it is hidden.

== Life cycle ==
=== Spiderlings ===
Nephila spiderlings leave the egg sac as a result of environmental cues, often warmer and wetter conditions in spring. They then live on a communal web, eating dead siblings and web debris for around a week before dispersing to make individual webs.

Young spiders do not generally build yellow-colored silk, and the young themselves can be easily mistaken for young orchard spiders (Leucauge) in general color and shape (both genera sport silver stripes or patches on their abdomens, described in some references as a form of heat control). The best distinction between Leucauge and Nephila juveniles is web structure: Leucauge species tend to build horizontal orbs that form a perfect circle, whereas Nephila species build vertical, elliptical orbs that are incomplete (missing the portion of the orb over the hub, the center where the spider sits). The latter seem to prefer more open habitat such as second-growth scrub or forest edges. Fences or building overhangs often do just as nicely.

=== Molting and growth ===
Once they are juvenile, Nephila spiders inhabit their individual webs, then begin their growth by the molting process. The time between molts is called an instar and seven to 12 of these can occur depending on food availability. Ecdysis, the shedding of the exoskeleton, occurs through the formation of a soft exoskeleton inside the current one. Once the old exoskeleton is shed, the new, larger one begins to harden. Ecdysis occurs when the spider's mass becomes too great for the current exoskeleton to support. Male spiders seek out females for copulation and live on their webs. When mating season arrives, both males and females stop molting and remain the same size for the remainder of their lives.

== Venom ==
The venom of the golden silk orb-weaver is effective in action on prey, but has not been reported to be of any notable consequence for humans if accidentally bitten. In the literature, Nephila is one of several genera where the venom "must be considered as more or less ineffectual in human beings". That said, the potentially large size of several members of the genus means that they possess relatively strong chelicerae, so any bite can cause some mechanical damage, but only of short-term localised effect for humans. However, further studies of the venom components are needed to better understand pathways associated with any toxicity.

== Interaction with humans ==
Nephila do not seem to form either beneficial or harmful relationships with humans. Females often construct their webs using human structures as a base for support strands due to their stability. Individuals are often found in urban and suburban environments due to the protection from predation and greater prey availability. As they weave their webs in bushes and near flowers, they might present a nuisance for gardeners or flower pickers. Some nests near fruits may repel or destroy known pests, such as Tephritid fruit flies, without the need to use insecticides. Spiders may bite humans if provoked but more often flee if confronted.

=== Golden silk ===
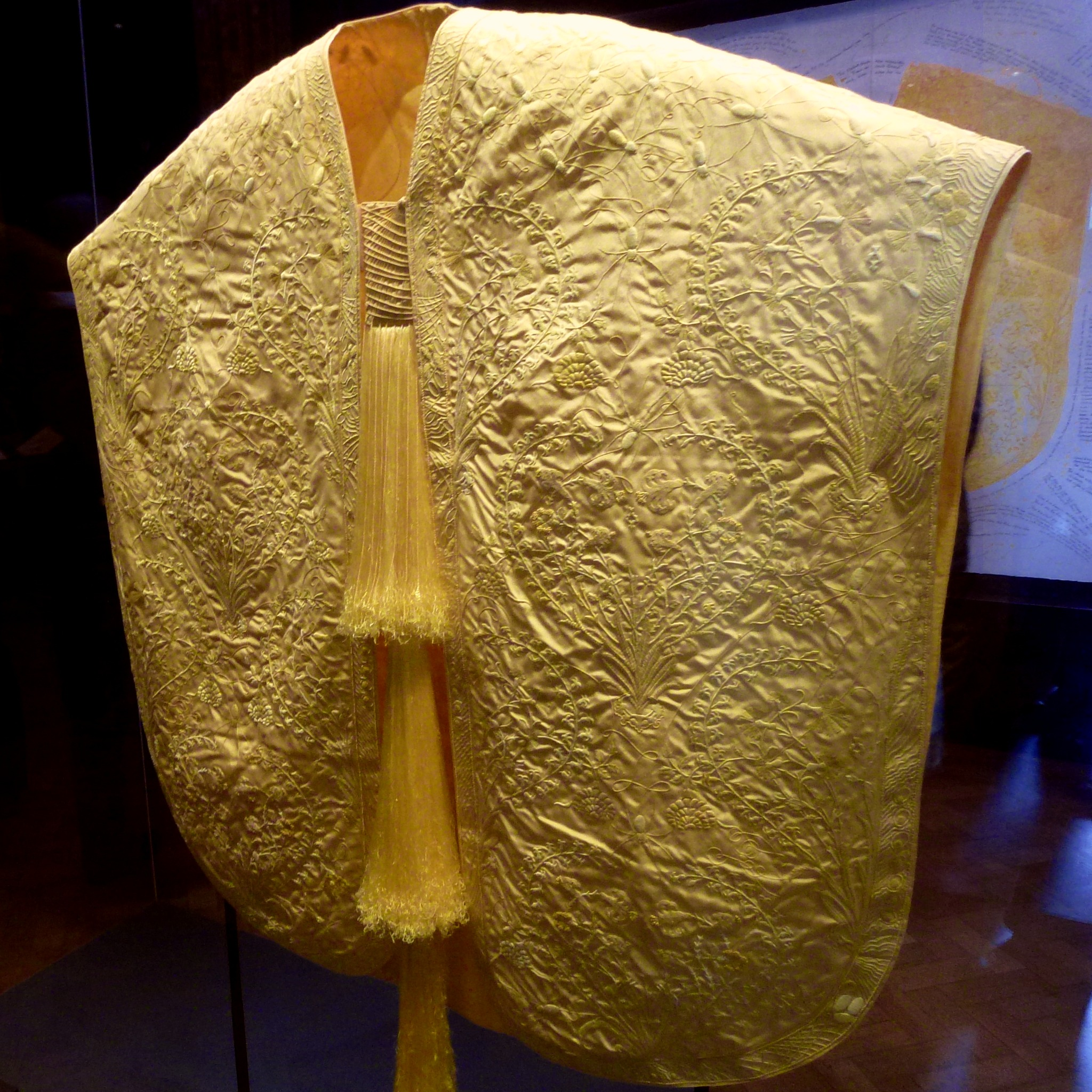
Golden Spider Silk Cape made from Madagascar golden orb-weaver spider silk, Victoria and Albert Museum, London

There have been several efforts in the past to produce garments from Nephila silk although none commercially viable. These include two bed hangings that were shown at the 1900 Paris Exhibition. In 2004 a textile designer, Simon Peers, and an entrepreneur, Nicholas Godley managed in three years' work and using 1.2 million Golden silk orb-weavers (collected in the wild and released some 30 minutes later after they produced the silk) to produce a shawl that was exhibited at the American Museum of Natural History in 2009. By 2012 they managed to produce a second, bigger garment, the Golden Spider Silk Cape, that, together with the shawl, were exhibited at the Victoria and Albert Museum in London. Two shawls and a traditional Madagascan lamba made of this spider silk were included in an exhibition of curios from the natural world in 2021.

Another possible use of Nephila silk lies in tissue engineering. A study from the Medizinische Hochschule Hannover reports that processed Nephila silk is an excellent scaffold material thanks to its biocompatibility, mechanical strengths, and its property to promote cell adhesion and proliferation. In particular, the silk acts as a suitable guiding material for peripheral nerve regrowth.

Fishermen on the coasts of the Indo-Pacific Ocean remove Nephila webs and form them into a ball, which is thrown into the water. There it unfolds and is used to catch bait fish.
