= Golden Spider Silk Cape =

2012 cape woven from spider silk

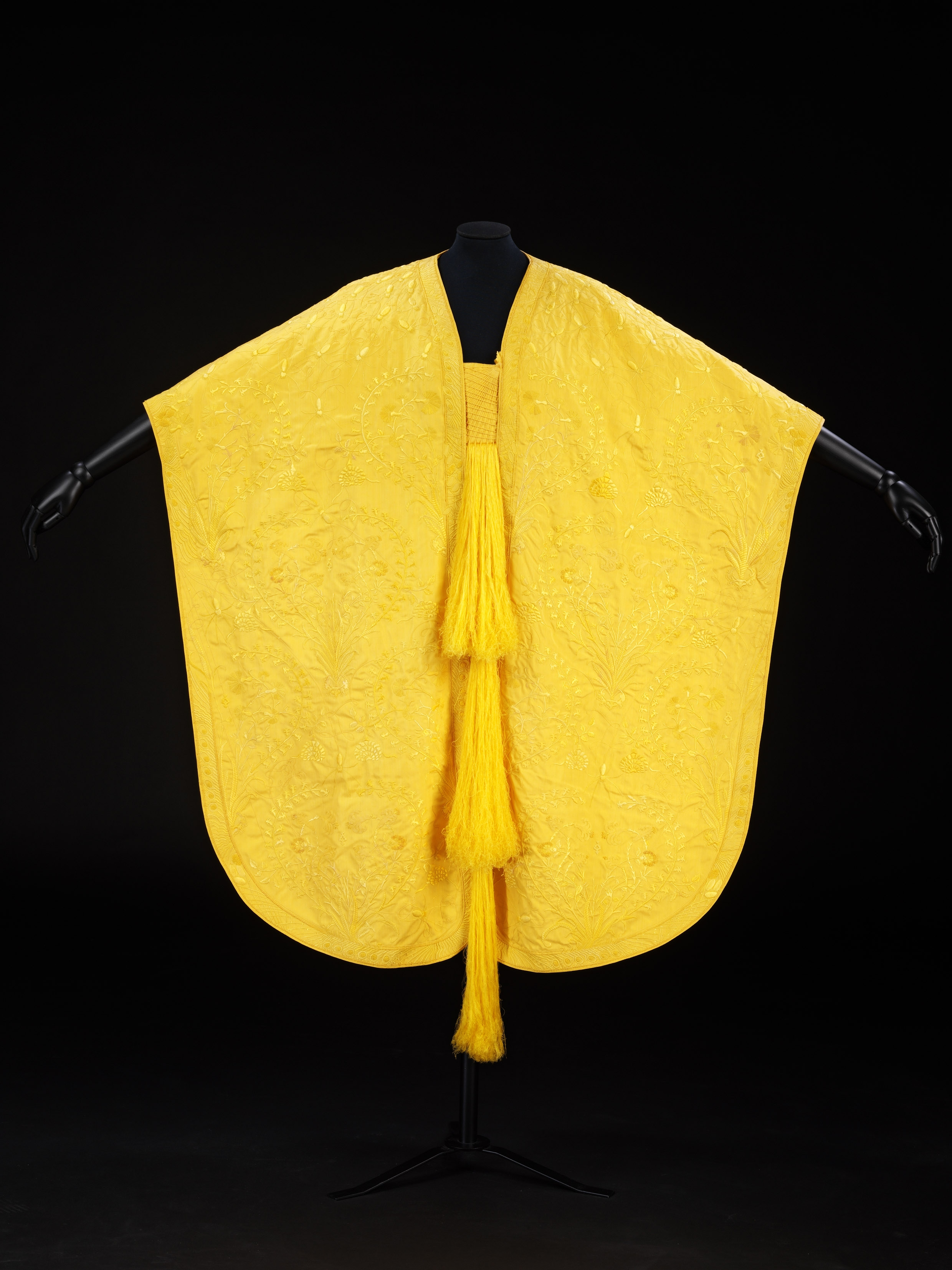
Godley & Peers Golden Spider Silk Cape at the Victoria & Albert Museum, 2011

The Golden Spider Silk Cape is a unique textile woven from the silk of over 1.2 million Madagascar red-legged golden orb-weaver spiders (Trichonephila inaurata madagascariensis). Created by Simon Peers and Nicholas Godley. The textile is not dyed; the golden hue is created by light refraction, and is the natural colour of the spider silk. The cape, which has been described as one of the rarest textiles on Earth, took approximately three years to produce. Its creation required meticulous, labour-intensive processes that combined ancient textile techniques with modern innovation. The Golden Spider Silk Cape was first publicly displayed at the Victoria and Albert Museum (V&A) in London in 2012, and has gone on to feature prominently in several other museum exhibitions.

== History ==
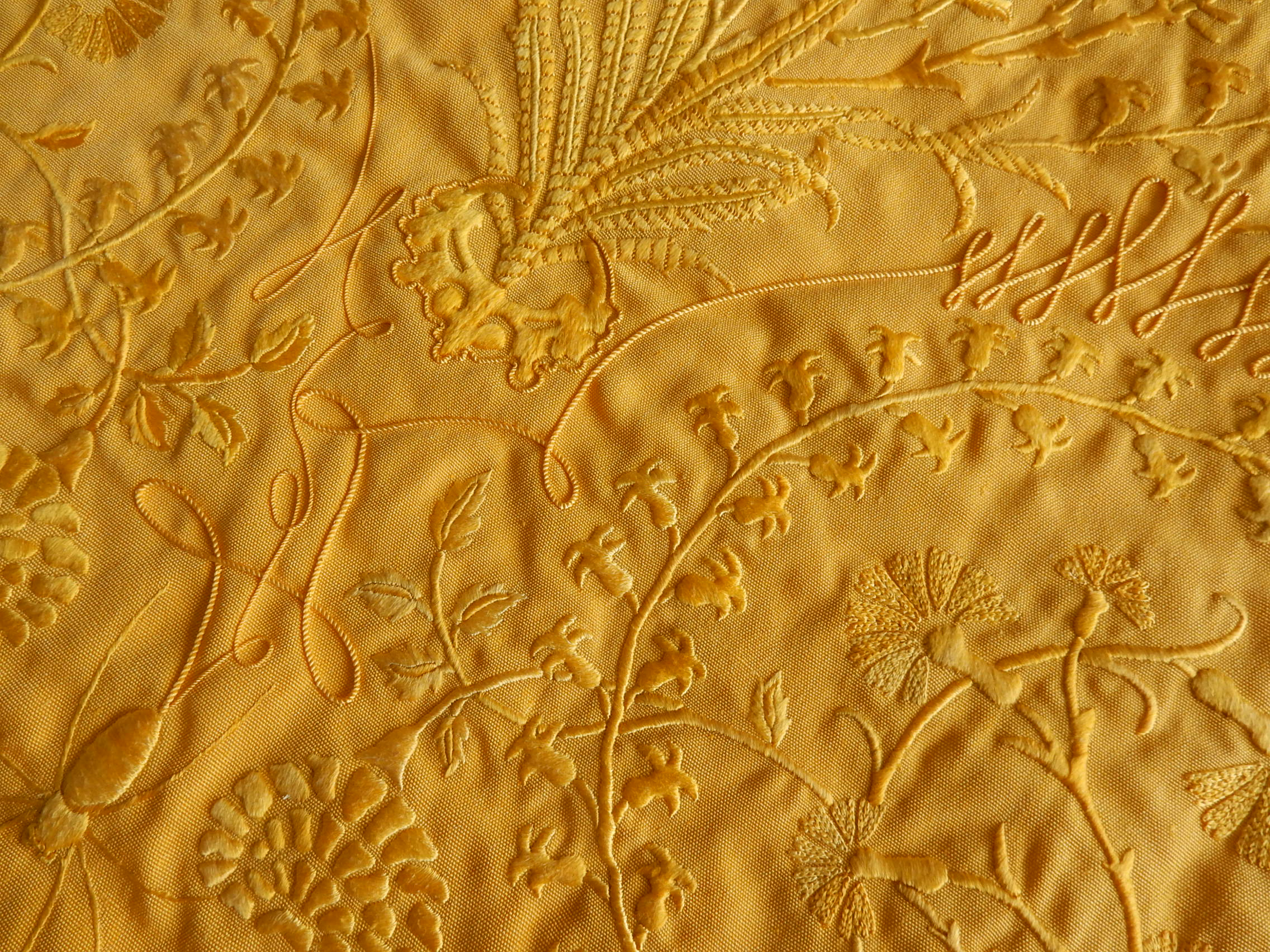
Detail view of embroidery on the Godley & Peers Golden Spider Silk Cape

Using spider silk in place of traditional silk has a long history. The first printed reference to spider silk thread is from Italy in 1621, where Dr. Epifanio Ferdinando describes that his friend and colleague, Dr. Girolamo Marciano, spun Tarantula egg sacs into a yarn, producing a small amount (just 450 grams/16 oz). In 1709, François-Xavier Bon de Saint-Hilaire began collecting spiders to gather cocoons and spin the fibers into threads. His treatise, Dissertation sur l’utilité de la soye des araignées, was published in 1710. Its success led to translation into Italian, English, Latin, and, at the request of Emperor Kangxi, into Chinese. In spite of the small amount of usable fiber produced by collecting a large amount of cocoons, Bon de Saint-Hilaire was able to produce some spider silk objects, including stockings and gloves, all given to assorted European royalty.

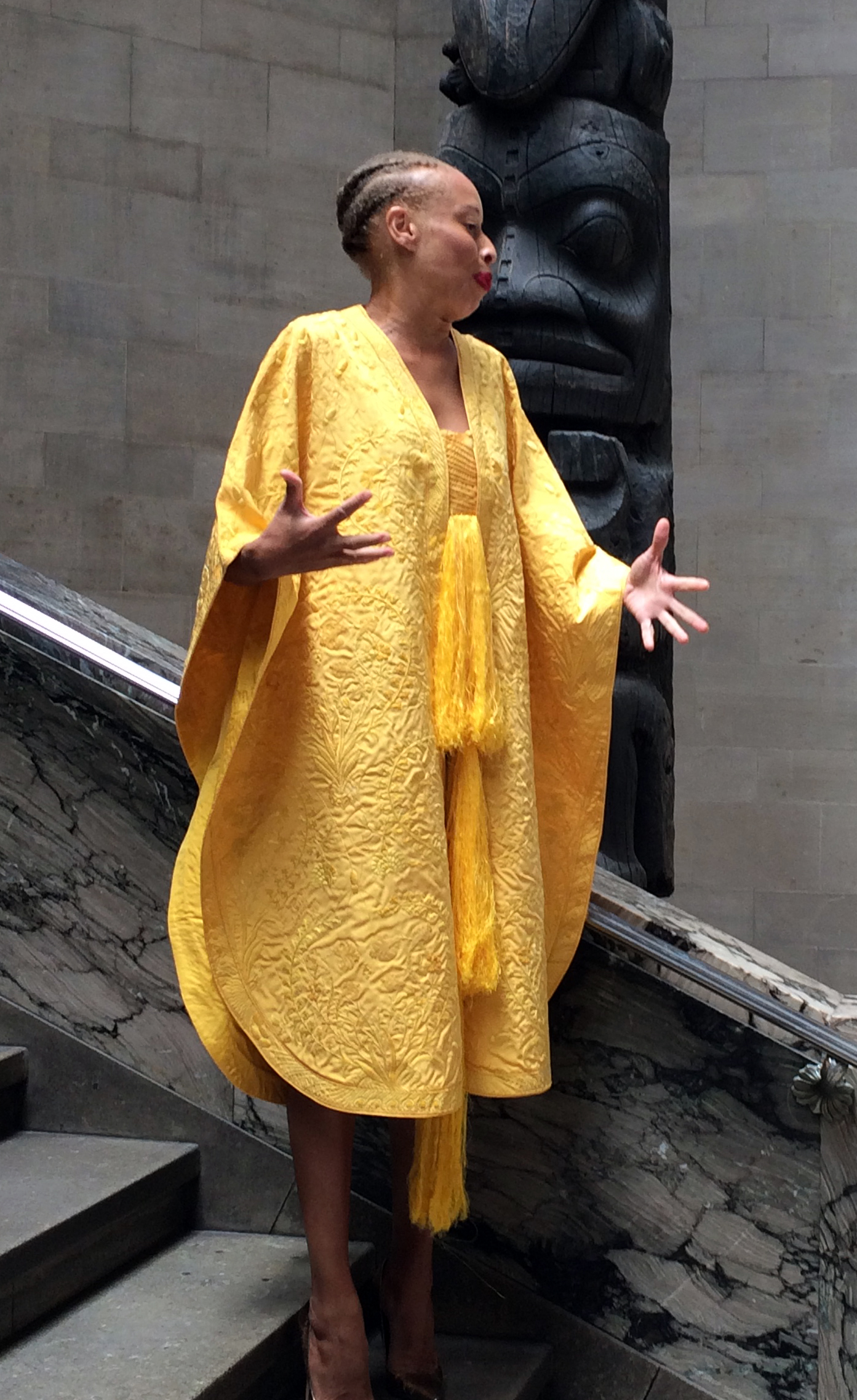
Stacey McKenzie wearing the Godley & Peers Golden Spider Silk Cape at the Royal Ontario Museum, 2018

Unaware of these antecedents, Spanish Jesuit priest Raimondo María de Termeyer began exploring the production of spider silk in 1796. Instead of collecting cocoons in the wild, de Termeyer established a spider farm, producing over 2,000 cocoons. In addition to the books he published on entomology, physics, and agriculture, de Termeyer wrote about spider silk, helping the idea to gain popularity in Europe, and proposing the harvesting of fiber directly from the spider instead of reclaiming it from a cocoon. He was able to produce a pair of spider silk stockings for King Charles III of Spain, and his pupil Carlo Sommaschi produced a large spider silk shawl for Empress Josephine.

Later in the 19th century, French Jesuit missionary Father Paul Camboué, located in Madagascar, realized that by establishing a system for collecting golden orb spiders and harvesting their silk, the resulting long, strong, golden-hued fibers would improve the strength and visual appeal of textiles made of spider silk. Camboué's work inspired French colonial authorities, led by M. Nogué, to produce textiles on a larger scale than previously possible, culminating in a bed canopy, now lost, for the colonial exhibition at the 1900 Paris Exposition Universelle.

In an effort to revive the history of harvesting threads from spiders, and to determine the possibility of creating a textile with these threads, Nicholas Godley, an American entrepreneur, and Simon Peers, a British textile artist and historian, began collecting spider silk in Madagascar in 2005. They have now created four textiles: two shawls, a large textile, and the Golden Spider Silk Cape.

=== Silk harvesting, weaving, and embroidery ===
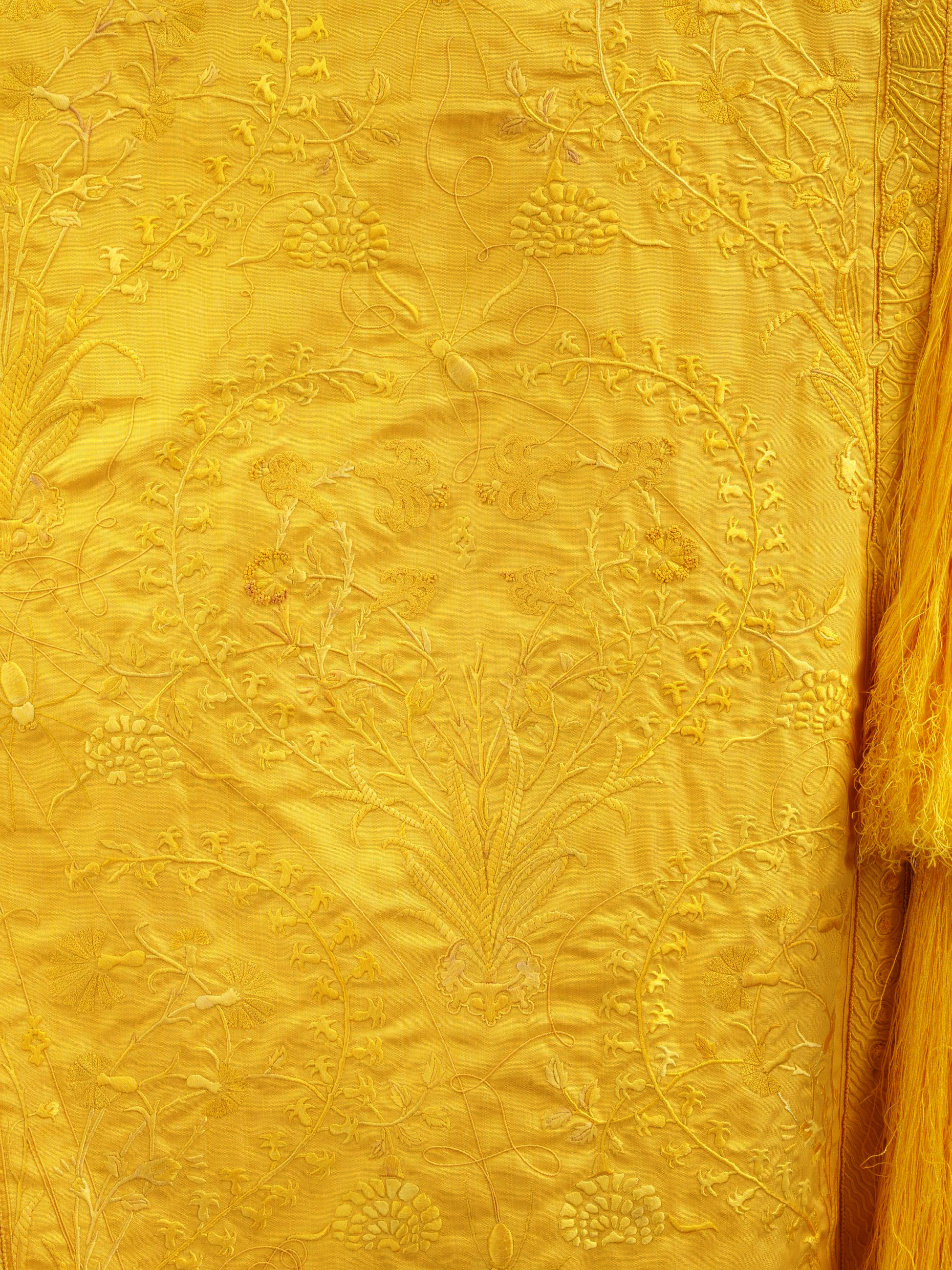
Detail, Godley & Peers Golden Spider Silk Cape

To produce just one ounce of spider silk thread requires 23,000 spiders. Producing the cape required 1.5 kg (53 oz) of thread. The thinnest threads used for the production of the cape were made of 24 strands of spider silk, with warp threads and embroidery floss being made of multiples of this basic thread twisted together, requiring as many as 96 individual strands. Only female golden orb spiders are capable of producing the thread used. Each spider produced about 100 feet (30 meters) of silk per extraction session, which took approximately twenty-five minutes each. After the silk was extracted, the spiders were released back into the wild to continue their natural life cycle.

More than 70 workers gathered spiders to produce the thread. Once the base fabric for the cape was woven, a team of highly skilled embroiderers spent a total of 6,000 hours adding the embroidered patterns. Peers's design for the embroidery includes scores of spiders weaving webs and floral motifs to illustrate the spiders' natural habitat. The design takes advantage of the widest possible range of embroidery stitches. Satin stitch, French knot, seed and split stitching, and couching twisted ropes onto the surface all produce different surfaces and textures, maximizing the thread's natural light refraction to bring the surface alive.

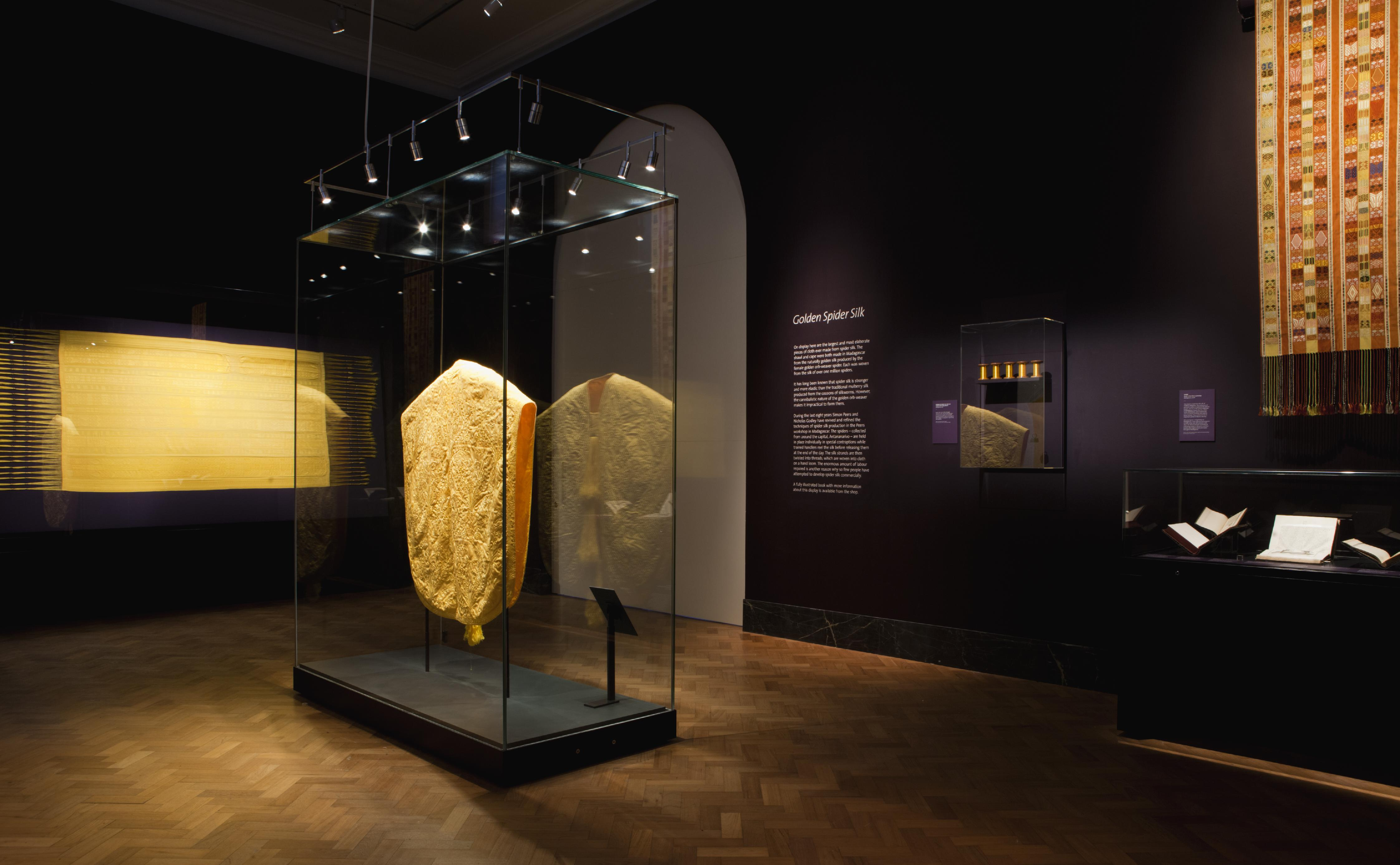
Godley & Peers "Golden Spider Silk" exhibition at the Victoria and Albert Museum, 2012

The front of the cape is closed with a multi-tiered vertical cascade of raw spider silk, showing the fiber in a more natural state to offer contrast with the highly controlled embroidered surface of the cape.

== Exhibitions ==
The Golden silk Cape was first exhibited at the Victoria and Albert Museum (V&A) in London in 2012 alongside the golden silk lamba made by Godley and Peers in 2008, as well as other rare fabrics.

The cape's exhibition at the Victoria and Albert Museum generated significant media attention and widespread acclaim from both art experts and the general public. It has since been displayed at the Royal Ontario Museum in 2018, and the Museum of Islamic Art, Qatar, 2024 .

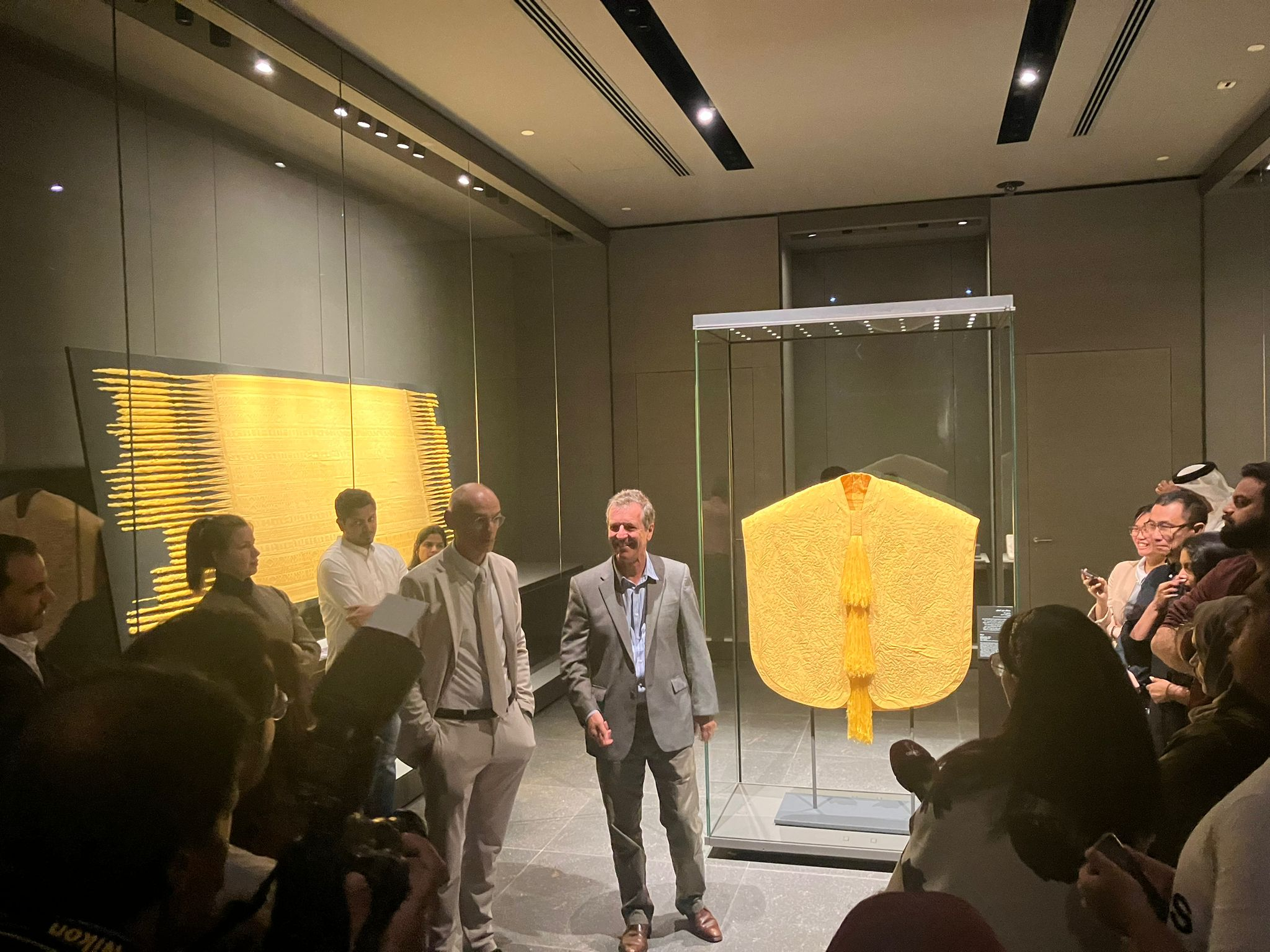
Nicholas Godley and Simon Peers with the Golden Spider Silk Cape at the Museum of Islamic Art, Qatar, 2024

The work Nicholas Godley and Simon Peers have done to revive the ancient art of creating textiles with spider silk has inspired further research into the potential applications of spider silk in various industries, including biomedical engineering and high-performance materials.

== See also ==
- Spider silk
- Lotus silk
- Textile arts
- Sustainable fashion

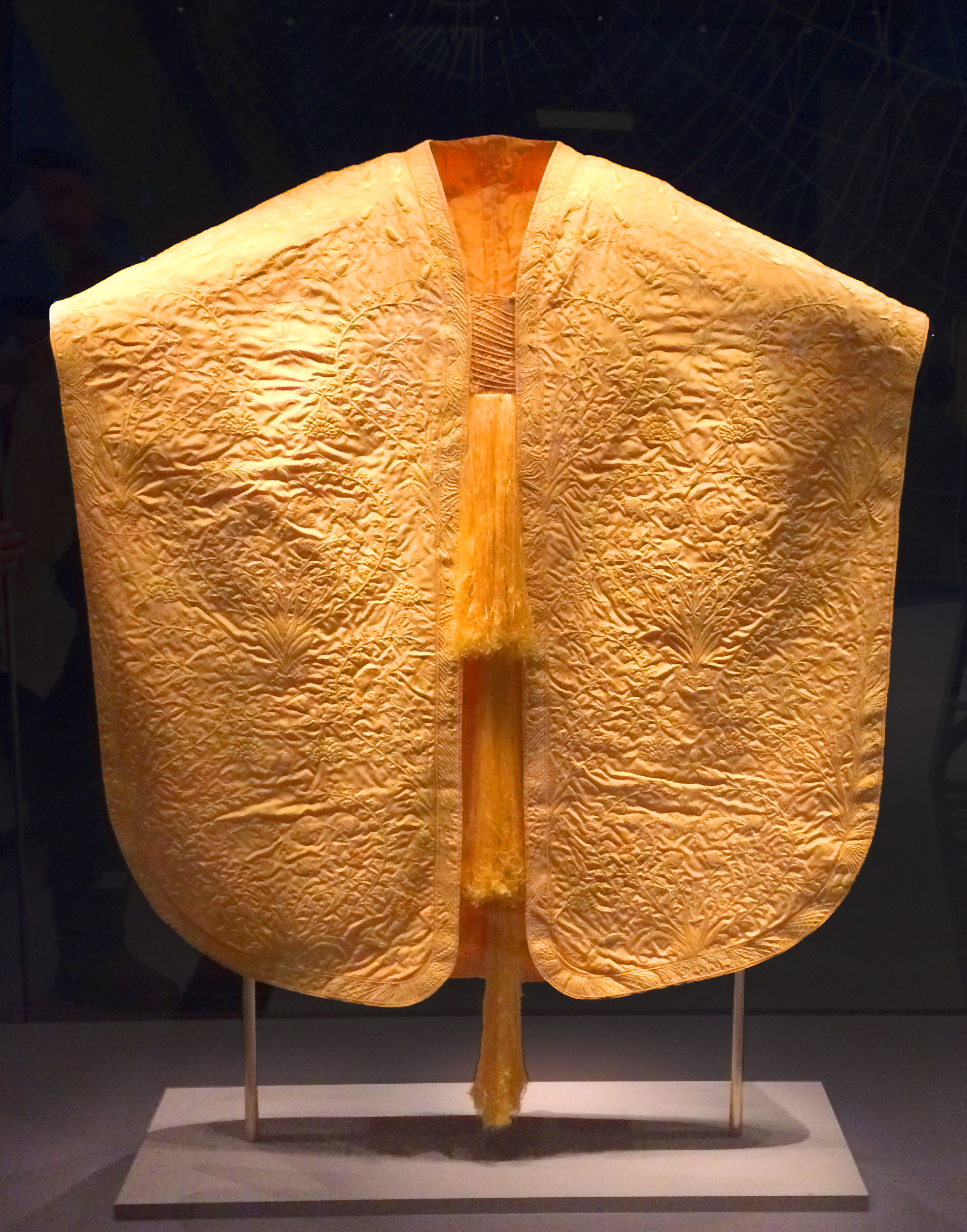
Godley & Peers Golden Spider Silk Cape on display in the Royal Ontario Museum, 2018

== Links ==
Godley & Peers website
