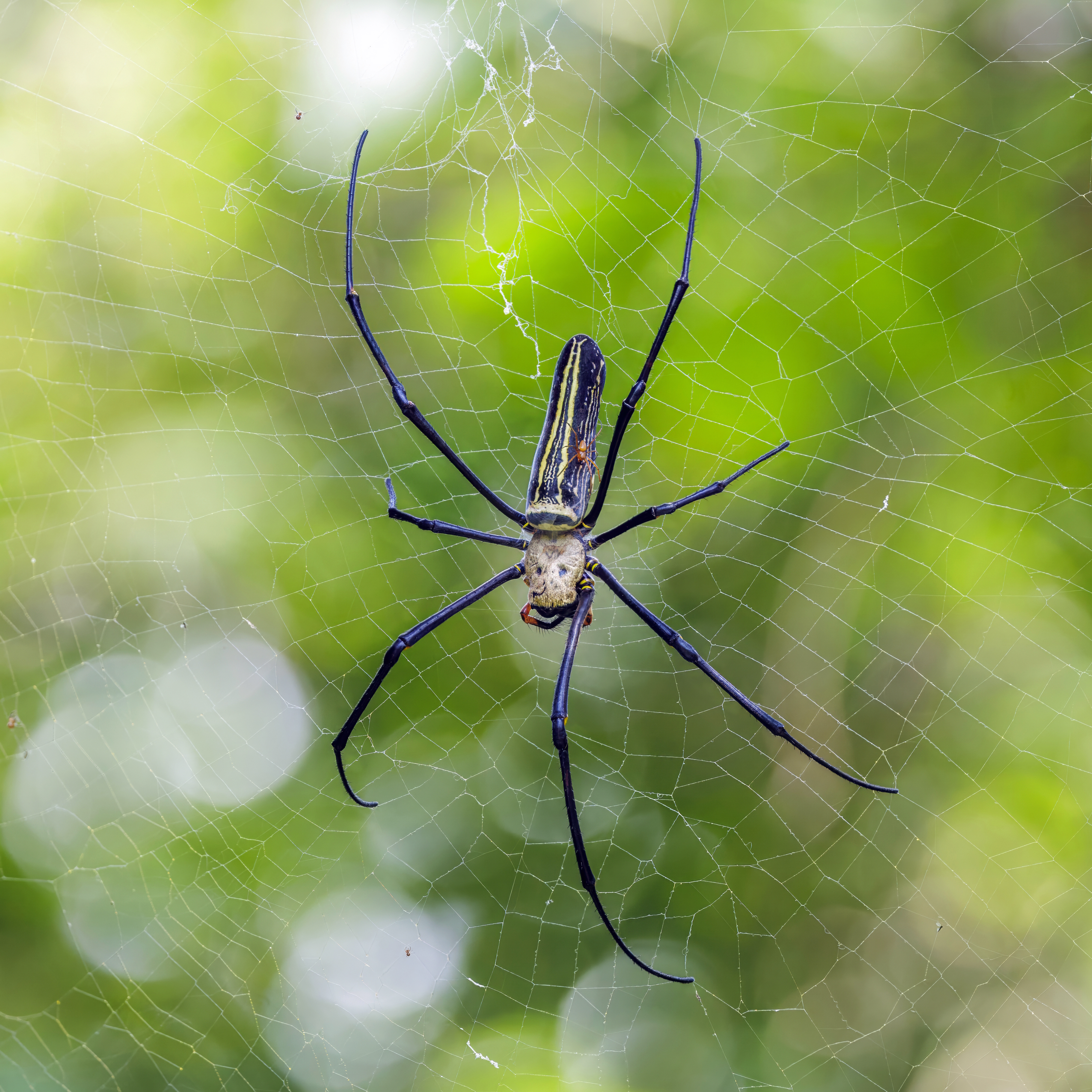
- Dorsal side: female and male Double Haven, Hong Kong
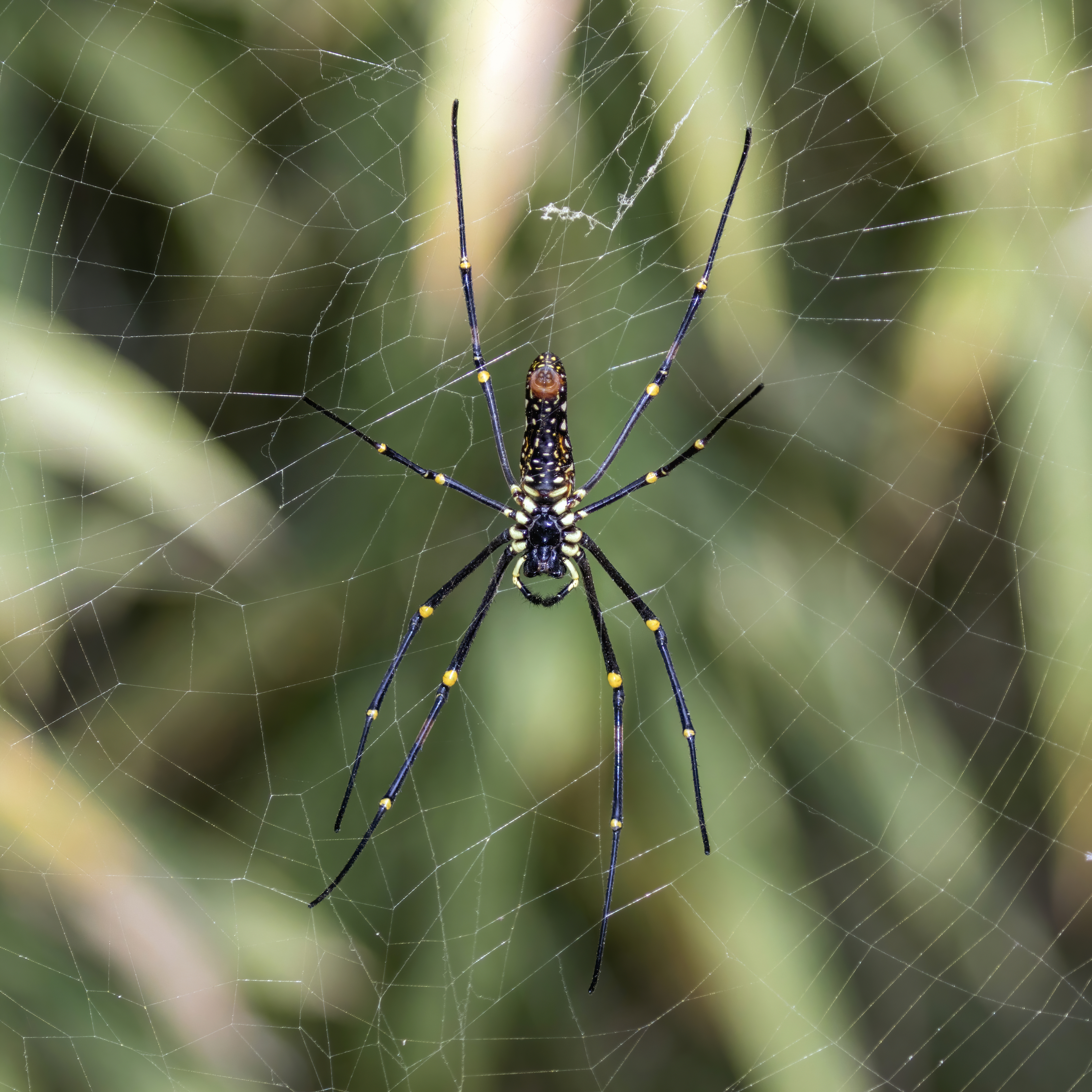
- Ventral side Madhya Pradesh, India

Conservation status
- Least Concern (IUCN 3.1)

Scientific classification
- Kingdom: Animalia
- Phylum: Arthropoda
- Subphylum: Chelicerata
- Class: Arachnida
- Order: Araneae
- Infraorder: Araneomorphae
- Family: Nephilidae
- Genus: Nephila
- Species: N. pilipes

Binomial name
- Nephila pilipes (Fabricius, 1793)

Synonyms
- List: Aranea longipes Fabricius, 1781 (Preocc.); Aranea maculata Fabricius, 1793 (Preocc.); Aranea pilipes Fabricius, 1793; Aranea sebae Walckenaer, 1805 (nomen nudum); Epeira chrysogaster Walckenaer, 1805; Nephila maculata Leach, 1815; Nephila fuscipes C. L. Koch, 1839; Epeira doreyana Walckenaer, 1841; Epeira caliginosa Walckenaer, 1841; Nephila ornata Adams, 1847; Epeira penicillum Doleschall, 1857; Epeira walckenaeri Doleschall, 1857; Epeira harpyia Doleschall, 1859; Nephila pecuniosa L. Koch, 1872; Nephila aurosa L. Koch, 1872; Nephila procera L. Koch, 1872; Nephila sulphurosa L. Koch, 1872; Nephila tenuipes L. Koch, 1872; Nephila submaculata Strand, 1906; Nephila pictithorax Kulczyński, 1911; Nephila robusta Tikader, 1962

= Nephila pilipes =

Species of spider

Nephila pilipes (northern golden orb weaver or giant golden orb weaver) is a species of golden orb-web spider. It resides all over countries in East and Southeast Asia as well as Oceania. It is commonly found in forests and coastal areas, near surface water, and against buildings and other terrain structures. Adult females are very large, with a body length of 25 to 50 mm (1 to 2 inches). Males are dwarfs, measuring only 4 to 6 mm (about 0.2 inch). It is the second largest of the orb-weaving spiders apart from the recently discovered Nephila komaci. The first, second, and fourth pairs of legs of juvenile females have dense hairy brushes, but these brushes disappear as the spider matures.

The N. pilipes golden web is vertical with a fine irregular mesh. It is not symmetrical, with the hub usually nearer the top. Rather than egg sacs being hung in the web, a pit is dug which is then covered with plant debris or soil.

== Subspecies ==
- N. p. annulipes Thorell, 1881 – (Indonesia)
- N. p. flavornata Merian, 1911 – (Sulawesi)
- N. p. hasselti (Doleschall, 1859) – (Java)
- N. p. jalorensis (Simon, 1901) – (India, Sri Lanka)
- N. p. lauterbachi (Dahl, 1912) – (New Guinea)
- N. p. malagassa (Strand, 1907) – (Madagascar)
- N. p. novaeguineae (Strand, 1906) – (New Guinea)
- N. p. pilipes (Fabricius, 1793)
- N. p. piscatorum Vis, 1911 – (Queensland)
- N. p. walckenaeri (Doleschall, 1857) – (Java)

== Description ==
N. pilipes display female gigantism and male dwarfism (see Sexual dimorphism section). In terrestrial animals, N. pilipes have the most size differences between males and females. This can be explained by the evolutionary selection for females with better fecundity. Female N. pilipes have huge parental investments to their progenies, including egg production and web construction (see Parental care section).

=== Female ===
Females typically have a body size of 30–50 mm. The cephalothorax is about 15 mm long, 10 mm wide. The abdomen is about 30 mm long, 15 mm wide, mostly dark yellow-brown color with yellow stripes. The tergum is generally black or brown, covered with dense hairs. Both rows of eyes bulge towards the rear. The plastron is mostly black and brown. The legs span very long, and they are black and yellow. There are no apparent hairs on all legs. It has been reported that this sharp contrast between yellow and black color can increase foraging success towards visually-oriented prey.

=== Male ===
Males' body size is typically 5 mm to 6.5 mm. The cephalothorax is about 2.5 mm long, 2 mm wide. The abdomen is about 4 mm long, 1.5 mm wide. Front eyes are larger than rear eyes. Males have light brown legs, with some hairs. The carapace is yellow with very few hairs.

=== Difference from close relatives ===
N. pilipes has a few different features which make it easy to distinguish from similar species. Unlike Trichonephila clavata, N. pilipes has a horn-like bulge on its tergum. Additionally, it has a pair of yellow stripes at its back of the abdomen unlike Nephilia laurinae.

== Sexual dimorphism ==
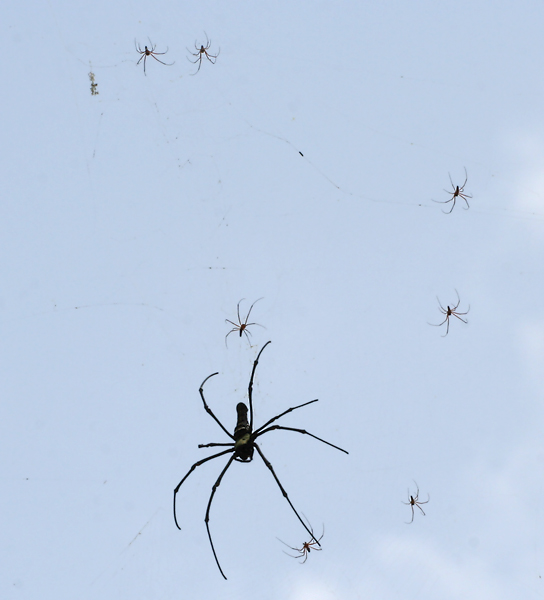
Size comparison of female with many males

N. pilipes display sexual dimorphism, the presence of a distinct difference between the males and females of a species. In N. pilipes, female spiders are much larger than their male counterparts, males can be 4–10 times smaller than the females.

Fecundity selection in N. pilipes causes females to continuously molt even after maturation. Although most spiders shed all their exoskeleton during molting, N. pilipes do not shed their genitals during molting, and thus can keep collecting sperm. The number of times the female mates will affect the post mature molting. Also, females are more likely to exhibit post-maturity molting if copulations are of short duration. After mating with one male, female N. pilipes will accumulate sperm until they have collected enough. This can be explained by fecundity selection. In order to maximize the number of progeny, females have the incentive to continue their body growth after sexual maturation until they have accumulated a number of fertilized eggs above a certain threshold. Females will use chemical signaling to attract more males to serve them after molting. This claim is supported by a study on N. pilipes' relative Trichonephila clavata, in which males highly prefer females that have molted recently.

Sexual dimorphism appears to be a shared feature among N. pilipes spiders of different populations, as examinations of populations in Southeast Asia, Australia, and Papua New Guinea show similar patterns of size dimorphism. Two hypotheses, female gigantism and male dwarfism, have been suggested as explanations for this observed sexual selection.

=== Female gigantism ===
One explanation for the dimorphism observed in the N. pilipes species is sexual size dimorphism may have evolved due to selection favoring female gigantism. Gigantism may have evolved in response to reduce the effectiveness of male mating plugs. With a mating plug, male spiders ensure that only the male who creates the plug post coitus will be the father of the resulting offspring. Although in the species of N. pilipes, plugging does not seem to have an effect as females are still able to have successful matings even with multiple plugs. The evolution of plugs occurred in earlier ancestral species and still persists. These traits were then passed down to one of its descendants, the living species N. pilipes. In this ancestral species, female gigantism was selected as a positive adaptation. In female spiders with larger bodies, the "embolic plugs" inserted in the N. pilipes females' genitalia become too thin to effectively seal the genitalia. Additionally, female gigantism would have been important to the ancestral species at the time when mating plugs were still effective, as body size has been shown to increase fecundity. By laying more eggs at a time, the ancestral females could have produced more offspring before they were plugged by a male.

Female N. pilipes spiders are able to achieve a large size because they can continue to molt and grow after maturity. This contrasts with most spiders, where growth stops once sexual maturity is reached. Female N. pilipes spiders will stop molting, however, during times of high copulation where it may not be advantageous to continue to grow as sperm are fertilizing eggs.

=== Male dwarfism ===
Alternatively, sexual size dimorphism may have evolved due to selection favoring male dwarfism instead of female giganticism. An explanation of how dwarfism was selected for is due to scramble competition in which smaller male size is advantageous for reproduction. In N. pilipes spiders specifically, male spiders that were able to find female spiders first often fertilize a greater percentage of their eggs than other males. Also, because female N. pilipes spiders often do not remain on their webs during sexual maturity, the smaller and more agile male spiders were able to reach them first, compared to the slower, larger males which often waited at the web of the female in advantageous spots. This explanation means that smaller males had a greater fitness due to the behavior of the female spider to move around in maturity as compared to that of larger males who did not move as much and often copulated with females in their webs after smaller males had already done so.

== Habitat and distribution ==
N. pilipes prefers moist habitats with no direct sunlight. It can be found in Japan, China, Hong Kong, Macau, Taiwan, Vietnam, Cambodia, Malaysia, Singapore, Myanmar, Indonesia, Thailand, Laos, Philippines, Sri Lanka, India, Pakistan, Nepal, Papua New Guinea, and Australia. In Australia, most N. pilipes are found in rainforest habitats in northern and eastern Australia, where climate is humid and vegetation offers shade against direct sunlight. In general, N. pilipes are distributed along coastal lines, where precipitation is ample. However, reports show that N. pilipes can be found in dry sclerophyll and low shrublands, hundred miles away from the coast. N. pilipes can survive in many climate types, including temperate coastal, Mediterranean, subtropical and tropical savannah climates. They construct webs in bushes and trees, near surface water, and against buildings and other terrain structures. To reduce heat from the sun, like other spiders, Nephila spp. has a thermoregulatory behavior. Experiments show that when the temperature reaches 32 °C (90 °F), Nephila spp. will adjust the angle between its body and the incoming sunlight, orienting its abdomen towards the sun but keeping the cephalothorax parallel to the web. When temperature further rises, it will align the full body along the sunlight direction, further reducing the area that is receiving heat from the sun. At temperature above 40 °C (104 °F), Nephila spp. will abandon the web. Unlike other relatives, the distribution of N. pilipes does not depend on seasons. Adult females are active throughout four seasons and continuously lay eggs. Adult males are present in the population for longer times than females.

== Diet ==
Nephila spp. prey upon only a few species. Nephila spp. will remove some specific insects from their webs. They avoid vespid wasps, alate ants, and other insects that secrete distasteful compounds. Due to Nephila's large body size, it can prey on insects with a broad size range, from 2 mm to even larger sizes than themselves. They adopt different strategies for different sizes of prey. Small prey are directly caught and removed from the web. For larger prey, they inject venom and wait. However, Nephila spp. have a dramatic change in predation style from the spiderling stage to adulthood. During the spiderling stage, they feed collectively on a common web. Upon reaching adulthood, they construct their own webs. Nephila spp. also reserve food caches to deal with periods of food shortage. They wrap surplus prey in silk and store them in the hub of the web. The silk covering can significantly reduce water loss due to evaporation. Food cache can reduce weight loss during periods with limited prey.

It has been reported that some N. pilipes can adjust the ultraviolet radiation reflected by stripes on their body to attract preys that are UV light oriented. The bands on the legs and body of N. pilipes can reflect UV radiation, so they are more visible to flying insects. The contrast of colors makes them look like food sources for insects, rather than a predator spider.

== Web structure ==
=== Web type ===
Generally, Nephila spp.'s web is not symmetric. Their silk appears to be yellow, hence the name golden orb-weavers. For adult Nephila spp., their webs are typically 0.5–1.0 m in diameter. However, when females aggregate together, their webs can be even larger. The hub of the web is usually at the top. Preys will mostly be trapped on the lower web.

=== Construction ===
The web constructed by N. pilipes has elastic silk at the center to absorb the kinetic energy of moving insects. Around the elastic part, some stiff structures fix the web to trees or other terrain structures. It has been reported that N. pilipes can adjust their silk composition, responding to different diet and environmental conditions. One study investigated the relationship between silk construction and prey types. When N. pilipes are fed with flies, small and airborne prey, the silk becomes more elastic, and the mesh size becomes smaller. When N. pilipes are fed crickets, large and powerful prey, the silk becomes stiff. Moreover, researchers also found that N. pilipes can change the silk's amino acid composition to fit their needs. The silk has excellent mechanical properties, more robust than most human-made materials, so the silk of Nephila spp. draws much attention in the field of materials science. However, when silks are artificially spun in the lab, they often have inferior quality.

=== Web damage and repair ===
Their webs, like other spiders, are subject to potential damage by birds and small mammals. When their webs are partially damaged, it usually takes N. pilipes 10–60 minutes to repair the web. However, if the damage is critical, the spider will consume the web and construct a new web in another nearby location.

== Mating ==
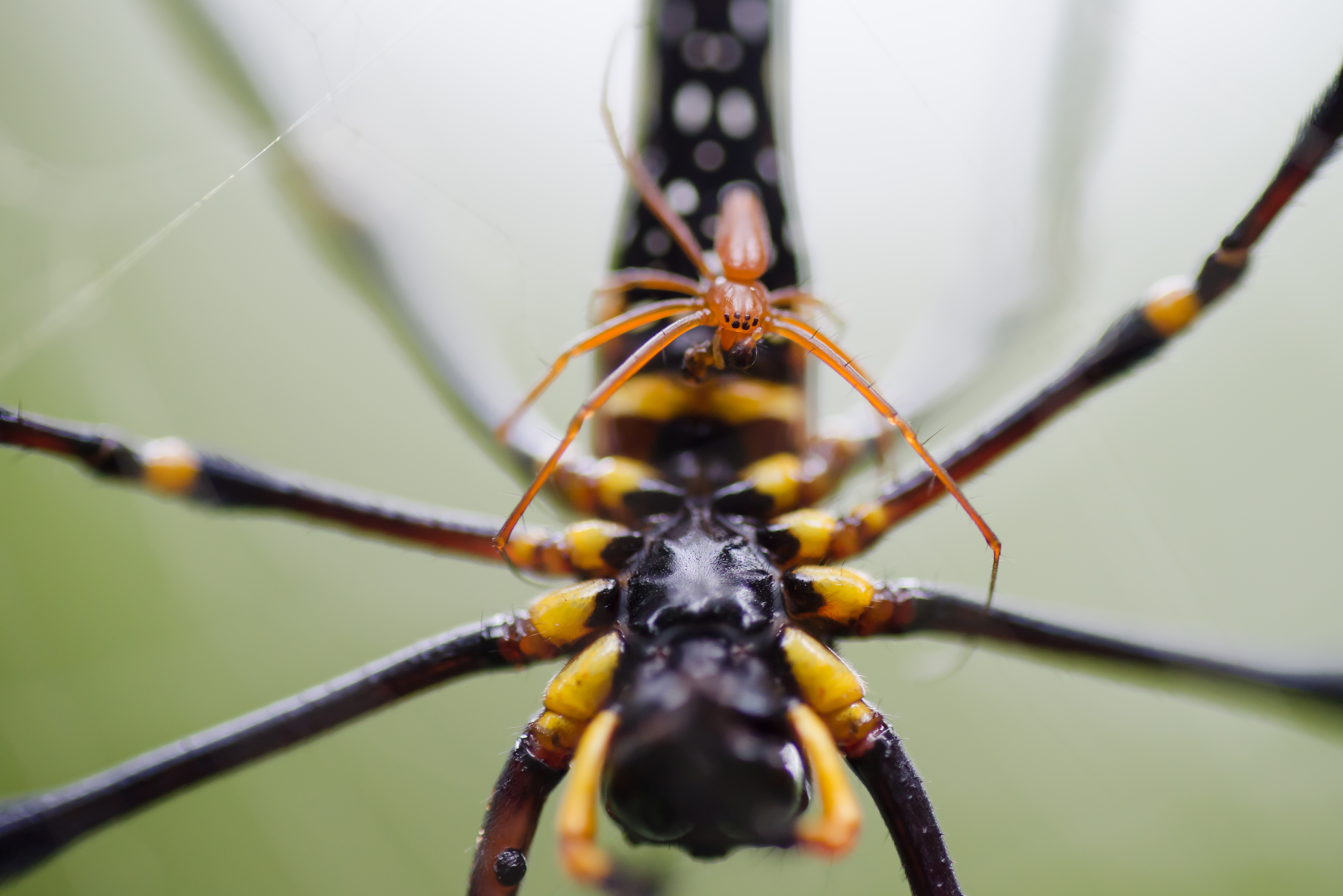
Mating pair in Kaeng Krachan National Park, Thailand

=== Mate searching behavior ===
Upon reaching adulthood, males leave their webs and begin the search for females. They look for the correct web chemical compositions and web characteristics. It is reported that N. pilipes do not have an airborne pheromone-based signaling system for mating.

=== Mating interactions ===
In nature, sexual conflicts between males and females are very frequent because males and females have very different reproduction purposes. Males have relatively less parental investment than females, so their goal is to fertilize as many females as possible. Females, on the other hand, tend to be reluctant to mate repeatedly and only select those males with good genes. Female spiders can display aggressiveness in a variety of ways: shake the web and chase the male when approaching; kick the male when the male makes contact with the female's leg; violently shake body when the male climbs up the female's dorsum; abruptly interrupt mating by kick the male off. Unlike other close relatives, N. pilipes have a less aggressive mating ritual, and sexual cannibalism is very rare. Males have evolved a mechanism called mate binding to avoid females' resistance and cannibalism. Males can deposit silks soaked with sexual hormones onto the female's body to calm the tactile and chemical receptors. In this way, males can reduce cannibalism and maximize the number of females they fertilize.

== Parental care ==
=== Oviposition ===
Other Nephila spp. lay eggs near their webs and cover the eggmass with a thick layer of silk. Then the eggmass is firmly tied to leaves and tree branches around it. The eggs are always found beneath leaves or other shades, which prevent direct UV light from the sun. However, N. pilipes is different from all other Nephila spp. Female N. pilipes lay eggs in small pits on the ground to avoid predation and parasitism.

== Predators ==
Few studies have been conducted to investigate the enemies of N. pilipes. The primary enemy of N. pilipes in nature is the bird, which evolves to fly by and take them without being entangled by the web. It is rarely reported that N. pilipes are attacked and killed by parasites like Hymenoptera. To avoid predation by birds, female Nephila often construct an aggregated web system with other females or other orb-weavers, so their web system can shield them from birds.

== Effects of bite ==
The bite of N. pilipes to humans is rarely reported. Its bites are likely similar to other orb-weaving spiders, which are reported to cause acute symptoms, including muscle pain, feeling of tightness, and reflexes exaggeration. Treatment with calcium gluconate can relieve victims from acute pains. Antiserum treatment can speed the victim's recovery.

== Ballooning ==
Ballooning is a common behavior among spiders. Spiderlings can disperse via wind to larger areas after birth to avoid overcrowded habitat and competition for resources. Research conducted in lab has found that N. pilipes will display ballooning behavior when the wind speed reaches a threshold of 3.17 m/s. However, ballooning is subject to many influences in wild habitats, such as wind angles, humidity, temperature, and pressure. Ballooning is also a social behavior. When the majority of spiderlings balloons, some spiderlings will sense the decline of the population and stay in the original place. Ballooning behavior explains the wide spread of N. pilipes, and sometimes colonization of islands.

== Human consumption ==
Raglai people in Vietnamese Bình Thuận Province consume N. pilipes after roasting them, and consider them to be a healthy food source. Notably, N. pilipes can save local people from hunger if they would otherwise run out of food.

== Gallery ==
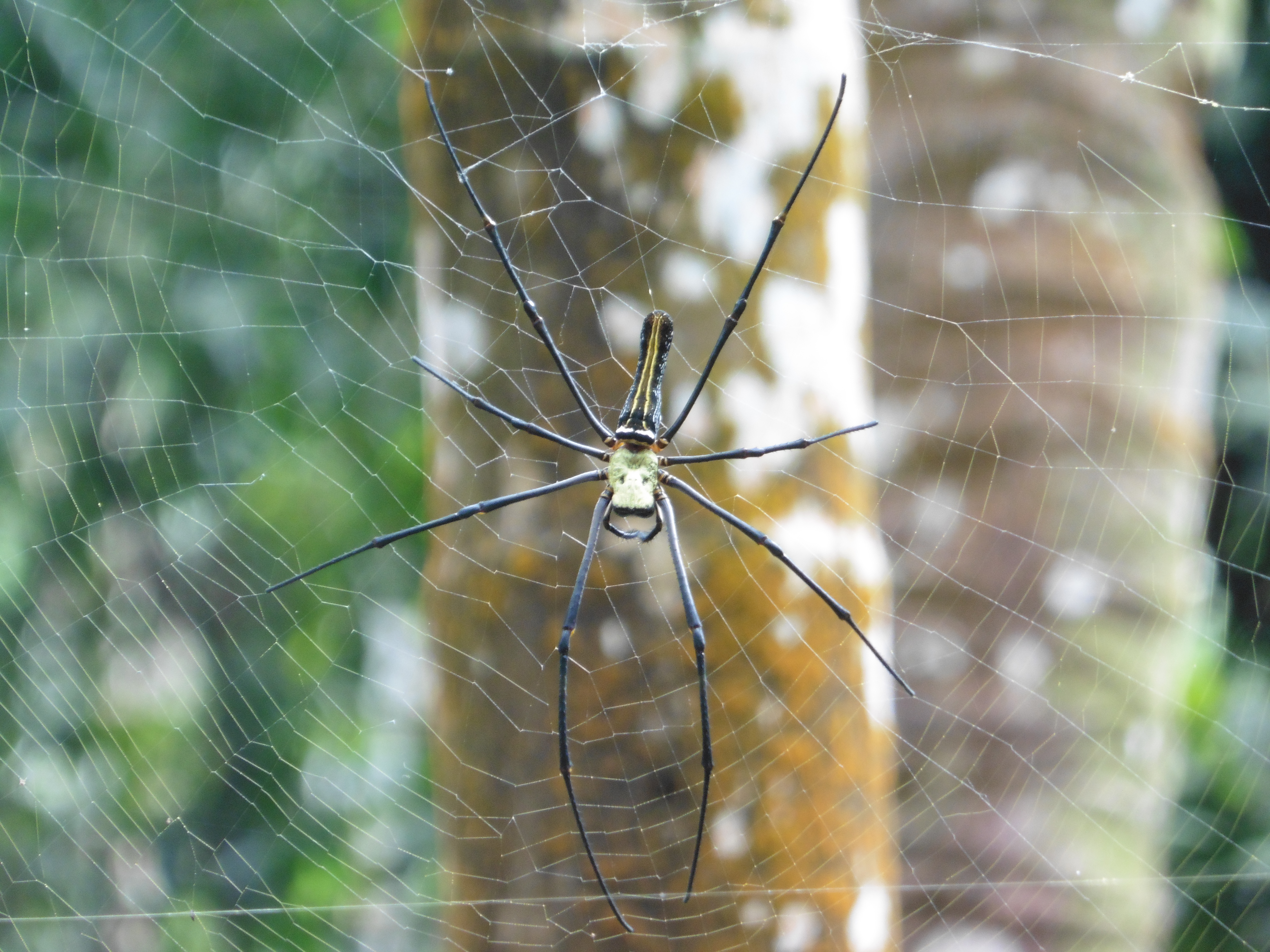
Goa, India

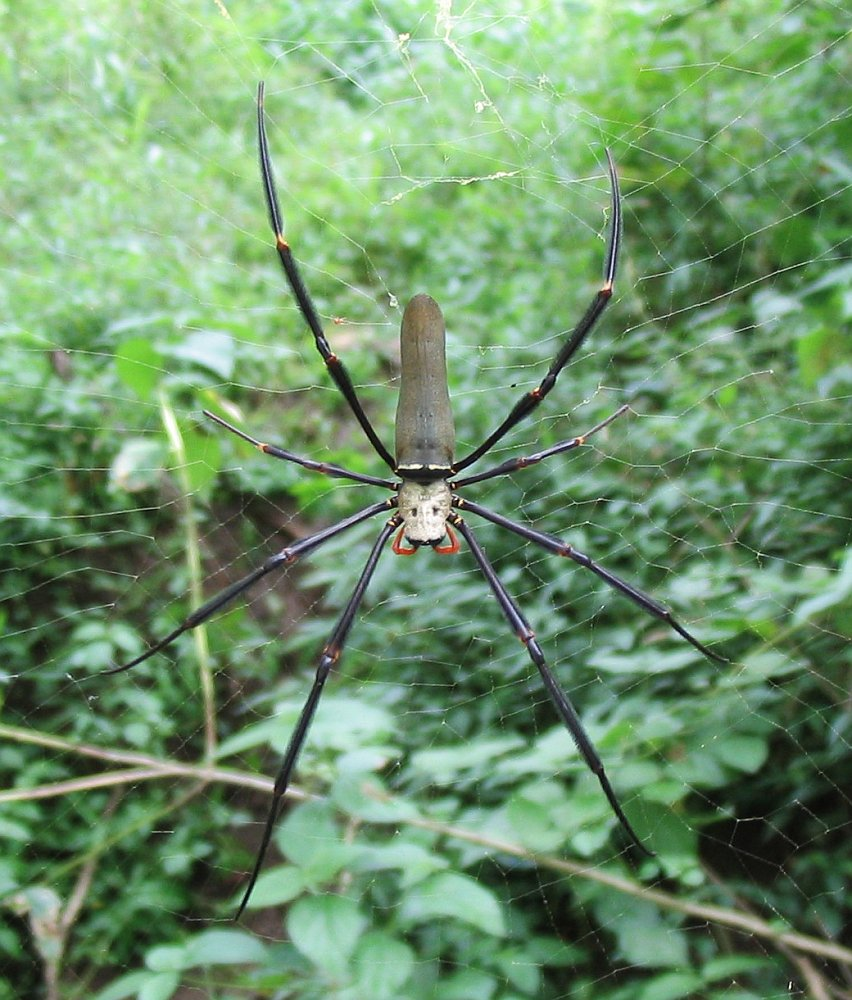
Northern Queensland, Australia

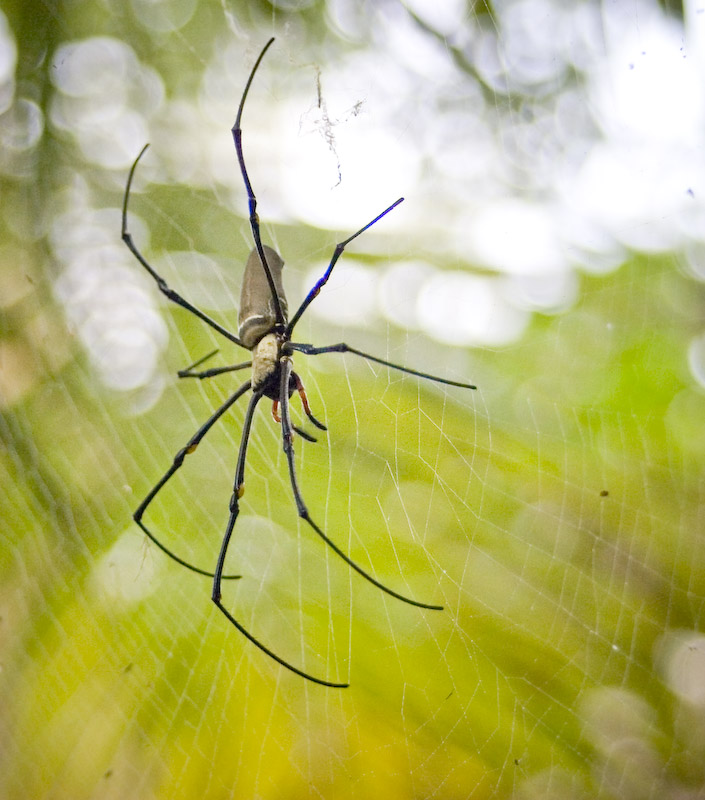
In Noosa Heads, Queensland, Australia

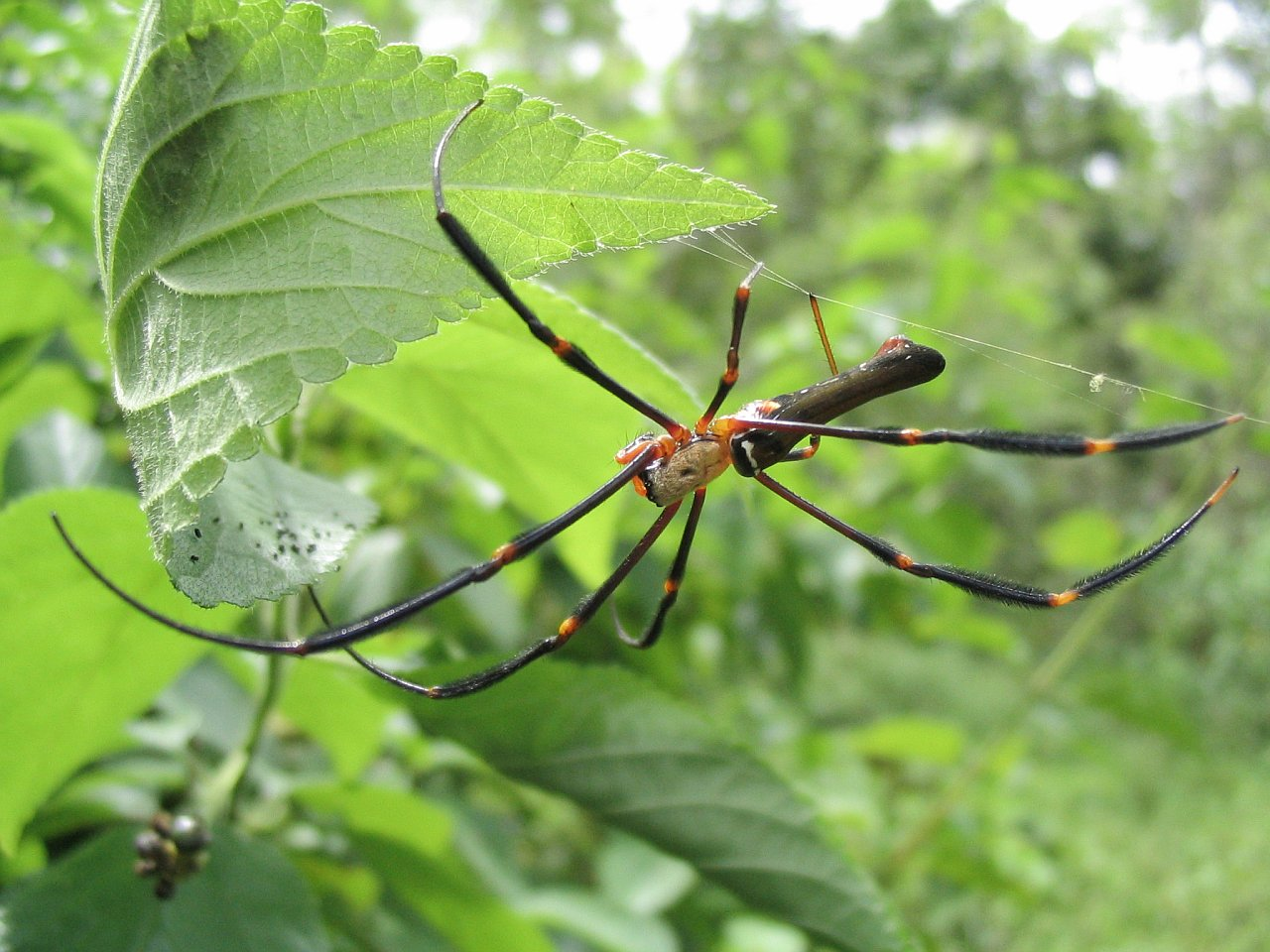
Juvenile

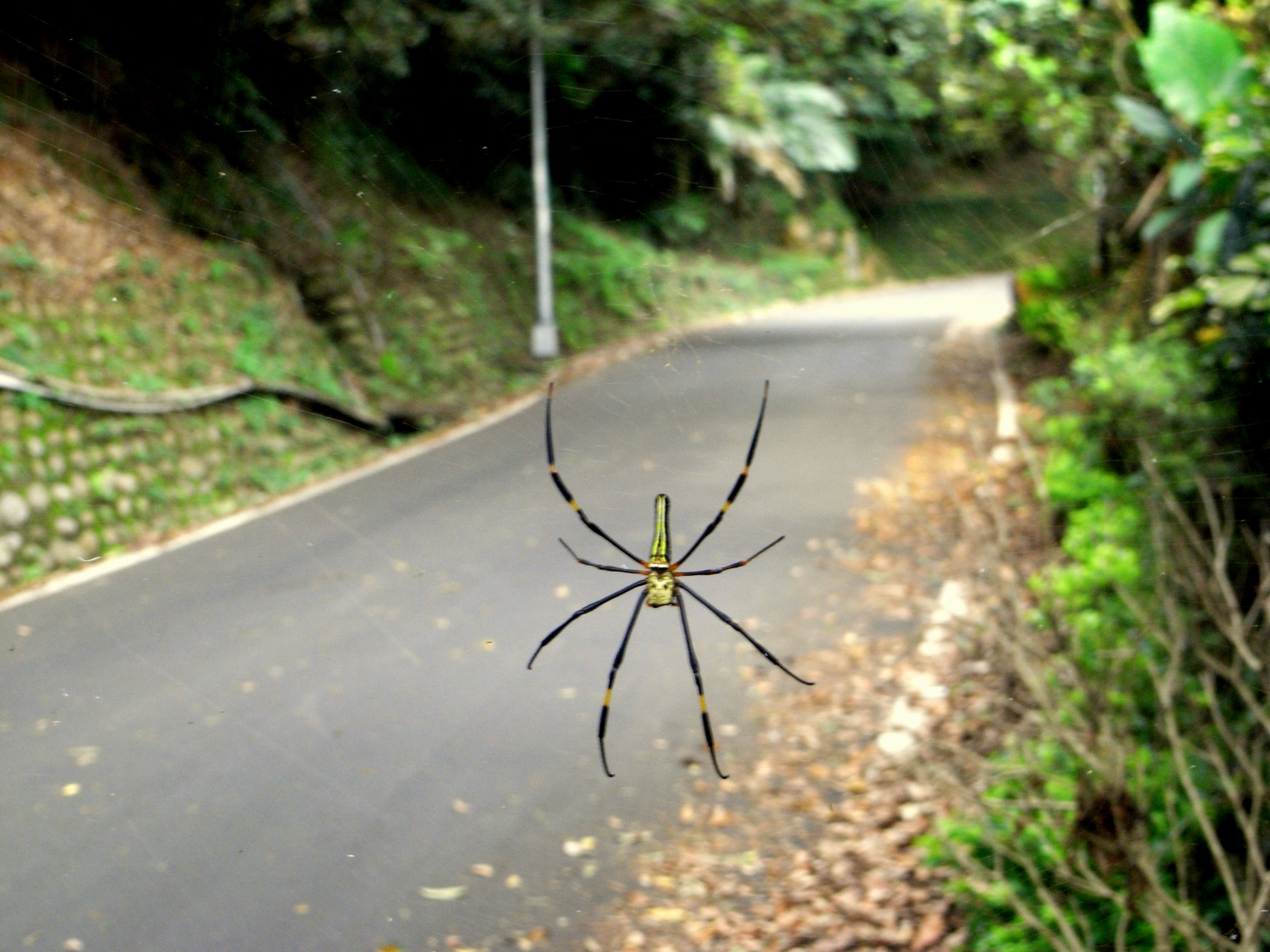
In Yangmingshan National Park, Taiwan

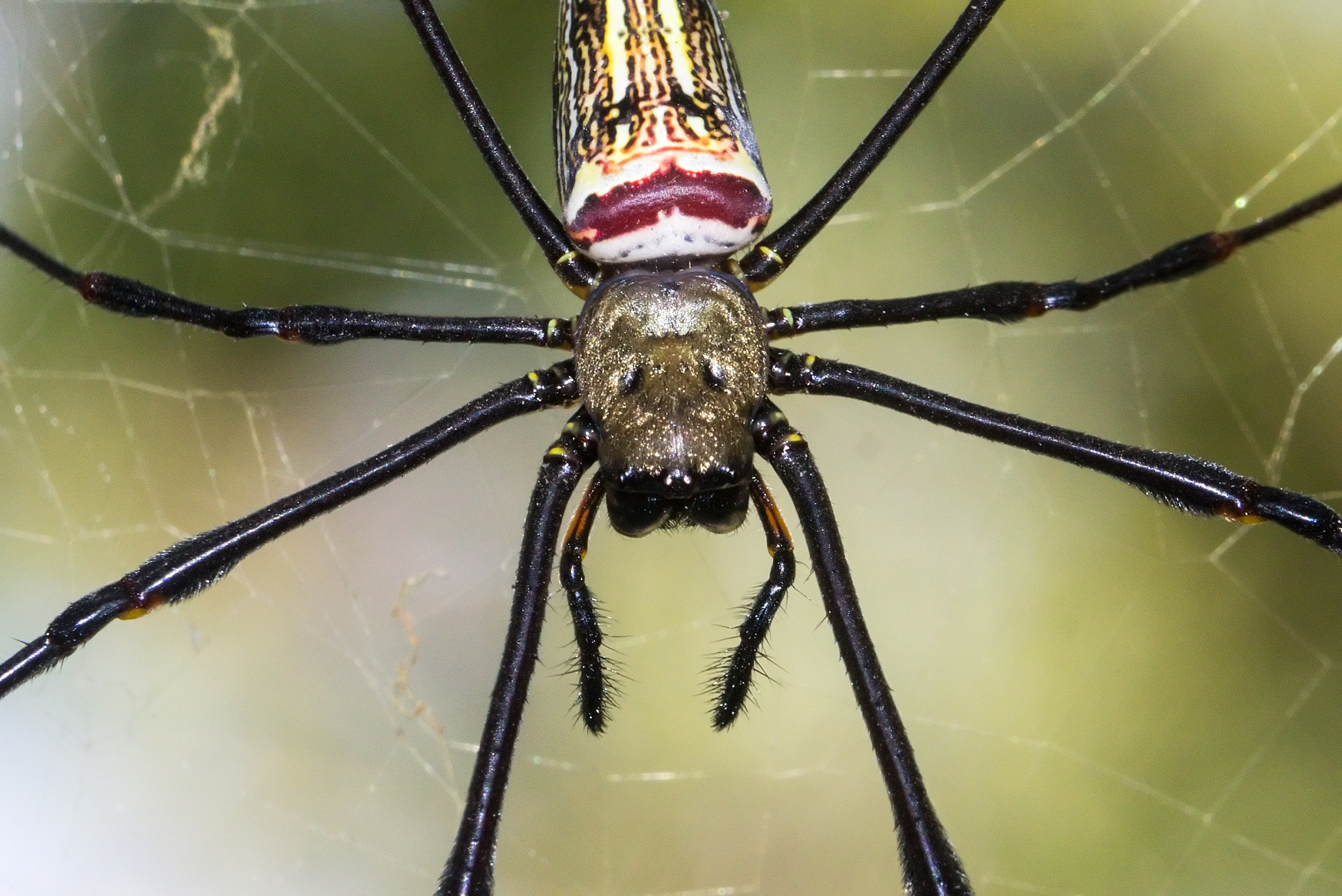
Portrait of female in Bantul, Indonesia

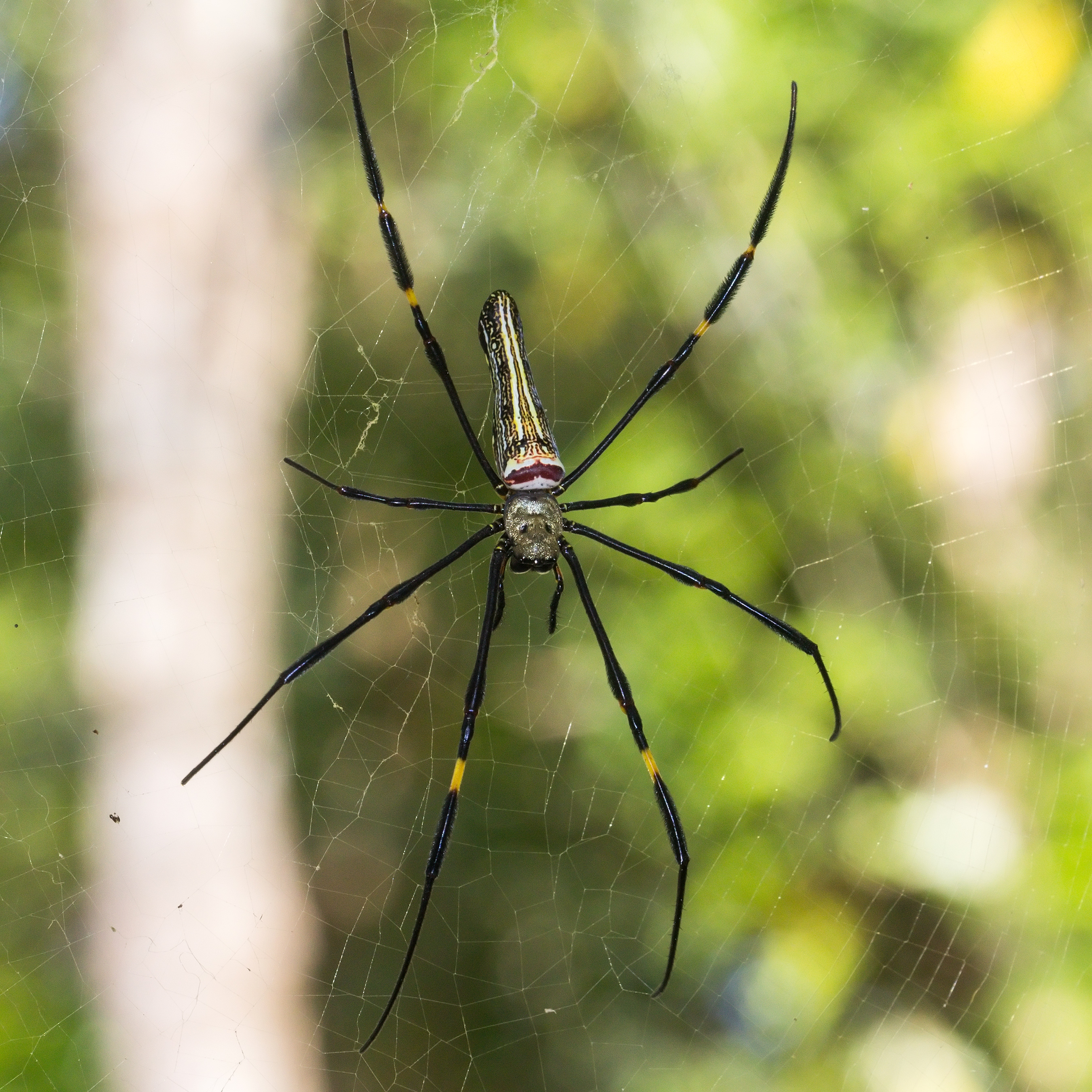
Bantul, Indonesia

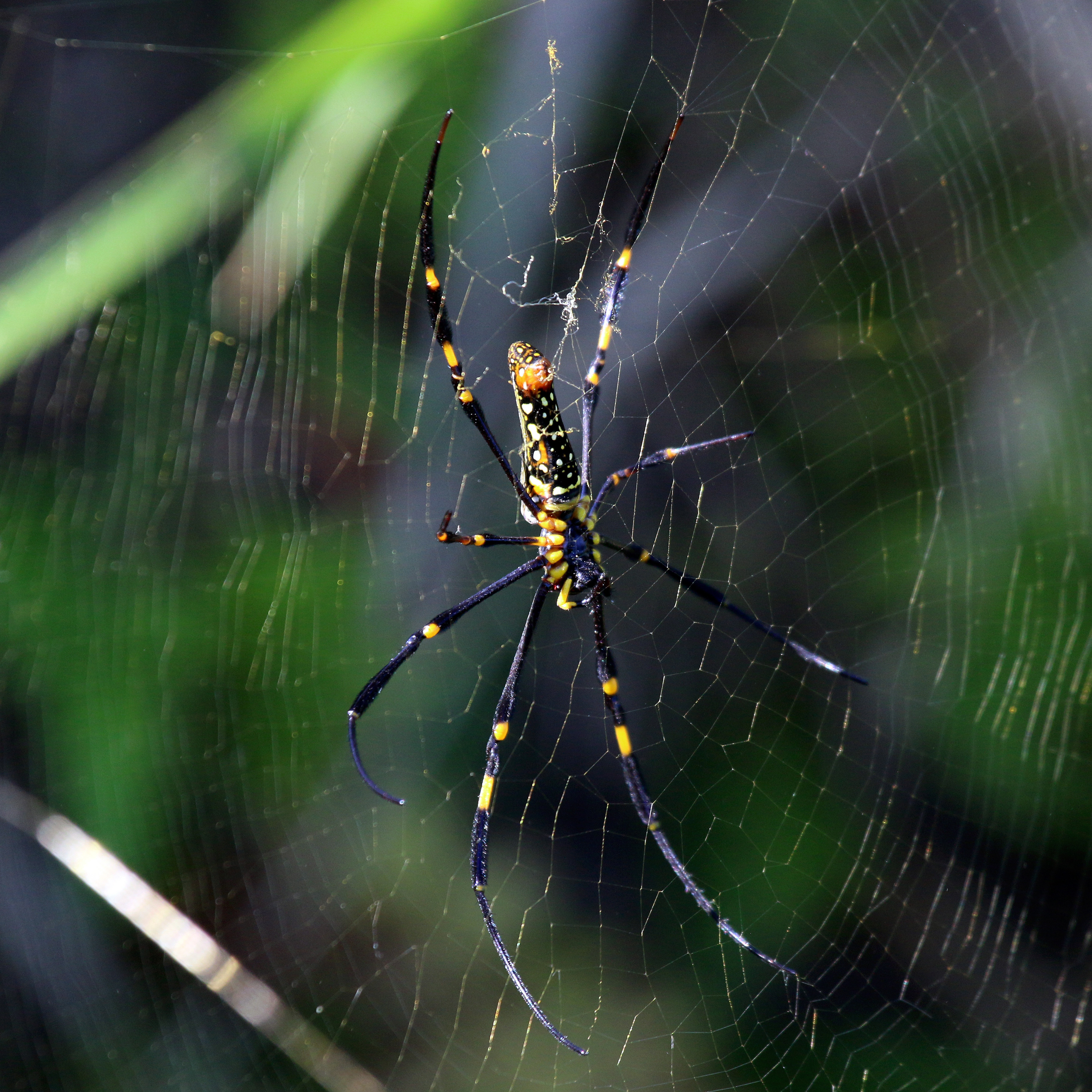
Bali, Indonesia

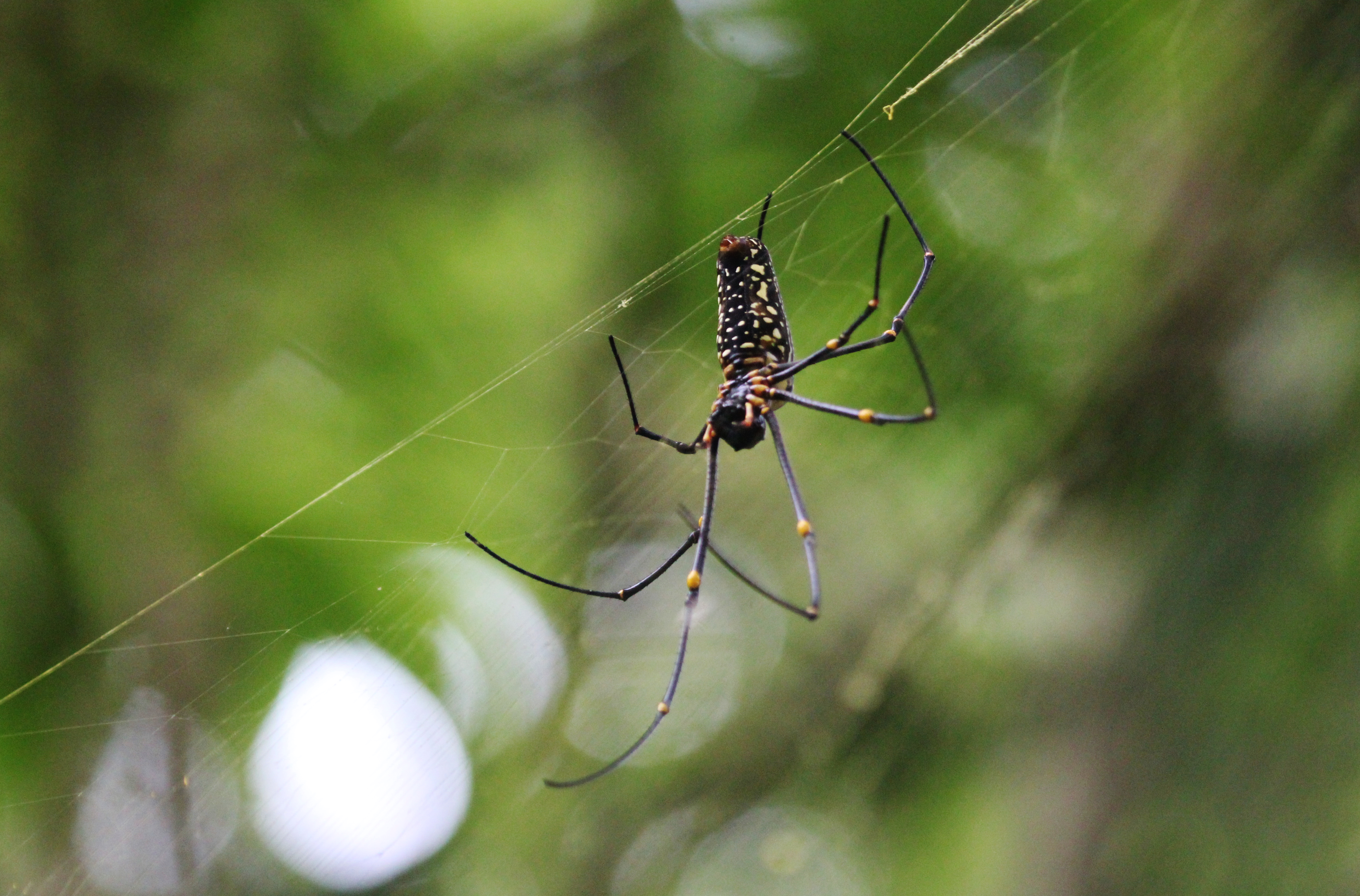
Kitulgala, Sri Lanka

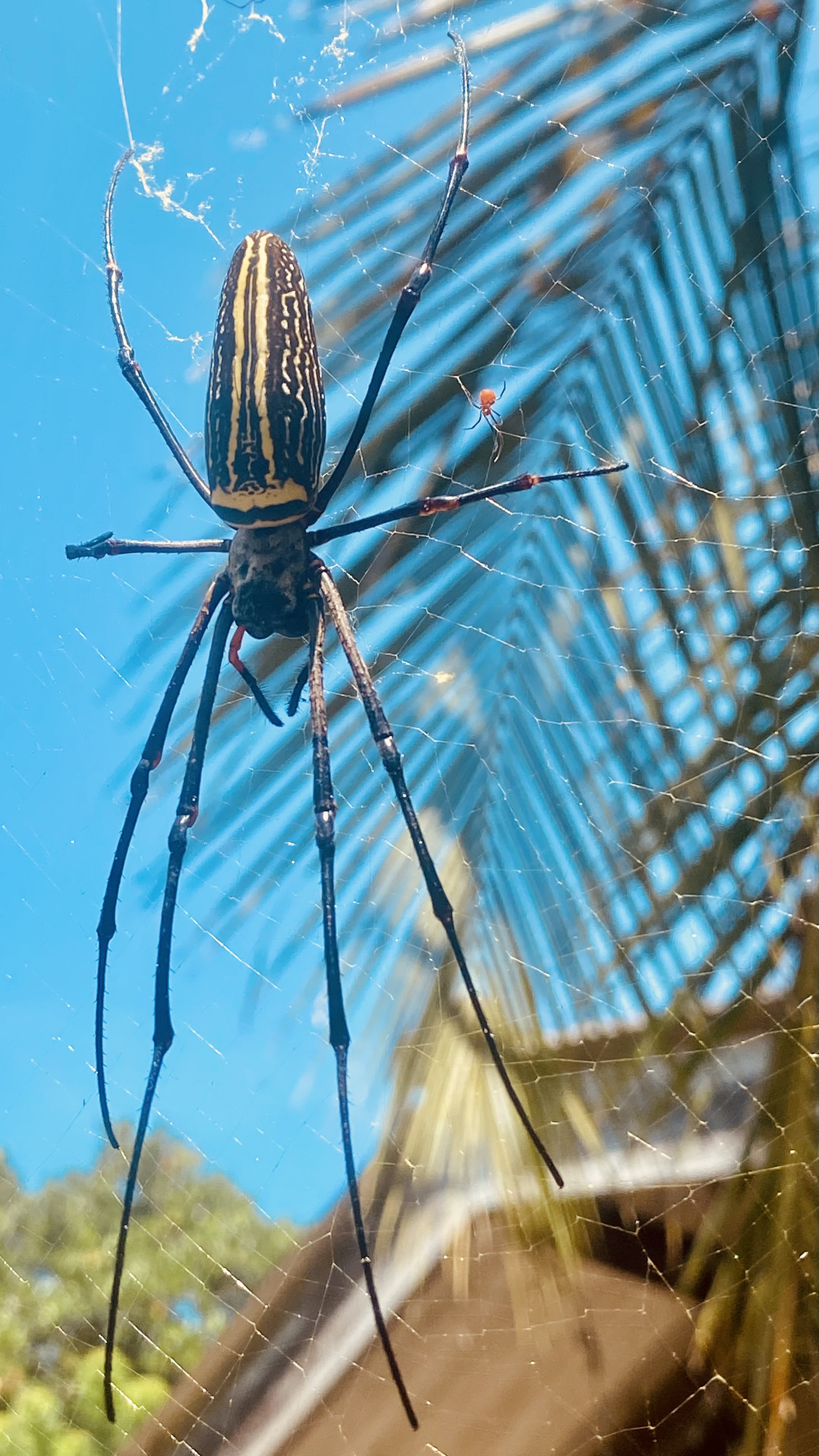
Female with spiderlings in Sri Lanka
