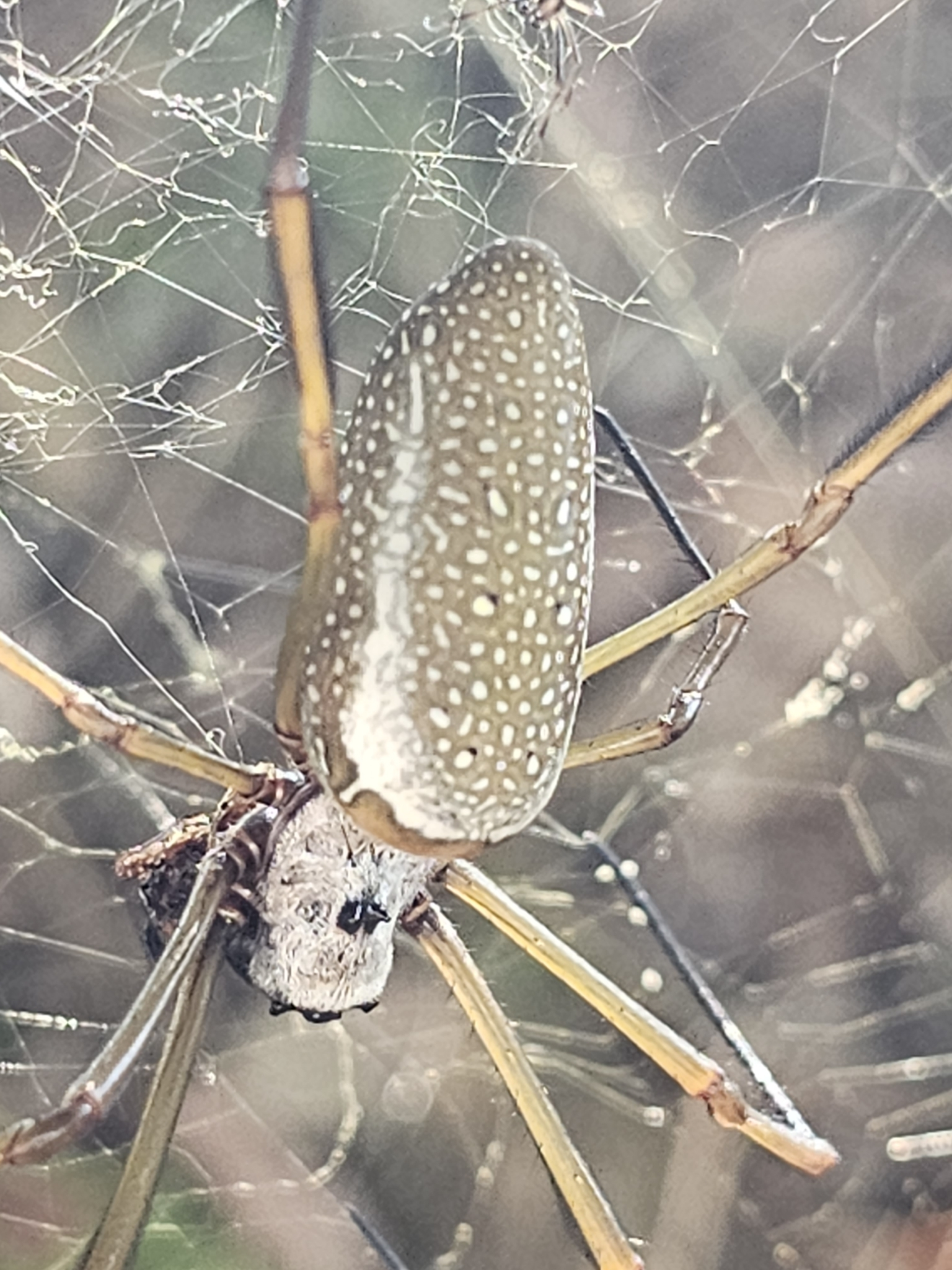

Scientific classification
- Kingdom: Animalia
- Phylum: Arthropoda
- Subphylum: Chelicerata
- Class: Arachnida
- Order: Araneae
- Infraorder: Araneomorphae
- Family: Nephilidae
- Genus: Nephila
- Species: N. cornuta

Binomial name
- Nephila cornuta (Pallas, 1772)

Synonyms
- Aranea cornuta Pallas, 1772

= Nephila cornuta =

Species of spider

Nephila cornuta is a species of spider from the genus Nephila.
