= Ramón María Termeyer =

Jesuit naturalist

Ramón María Termeyer (2 February 1737 – c. 1815) was a Jesuit naturalist who lived in South America. He conducted experiments on silk including those from silkworms and spiders, plants, and electric eels. Following the Suppression of the Society of Jesus, he retired to live in Italy where he continued his research and writing.

== Life and work ==
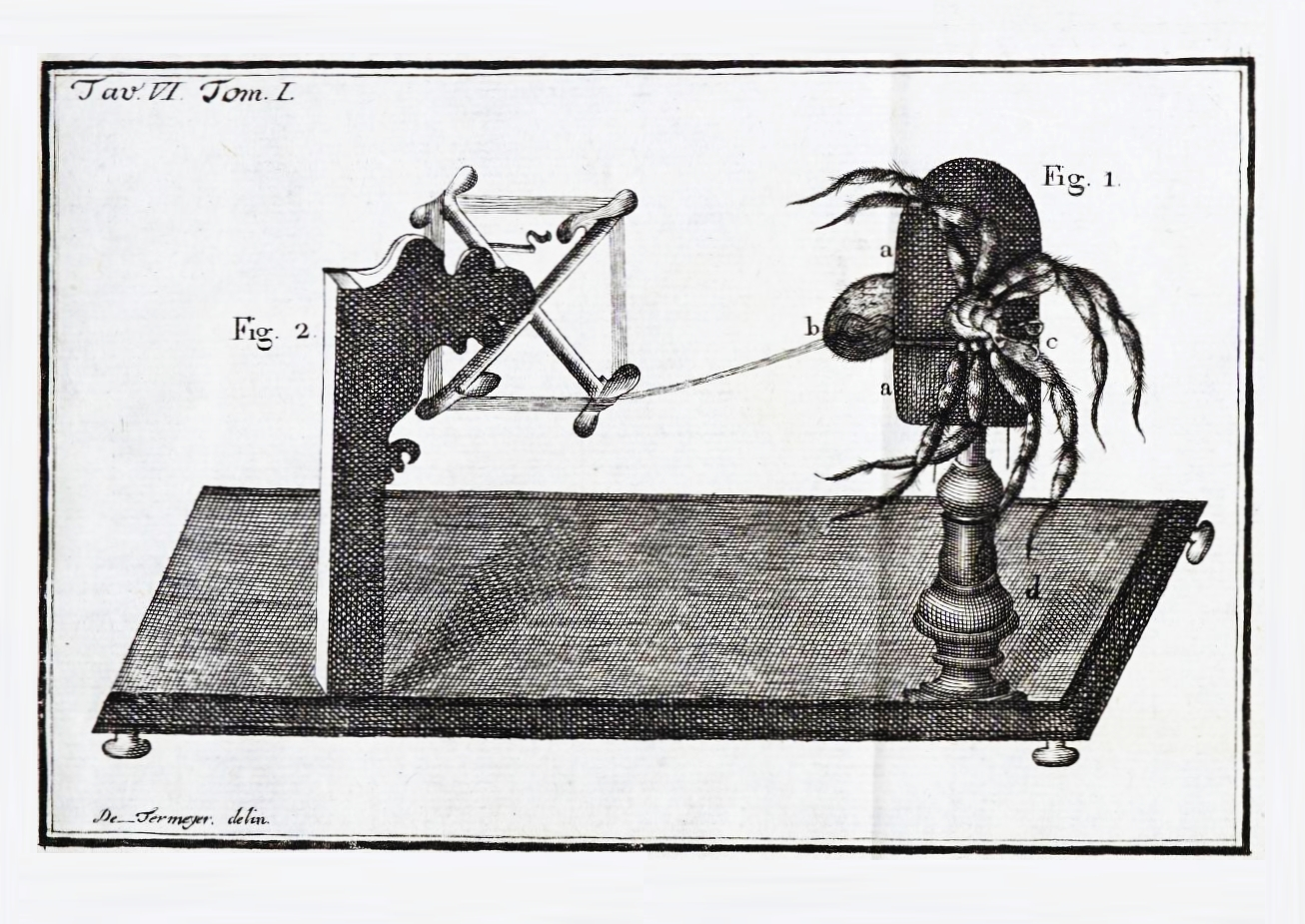
Termeyer's device for reeling spider silk

Termeyer was born in Cadiz and came from a family of Dutch descent. He joined the Society of Jesus in Andalusia on October 11, 1755 and in 1763 he was ordained in Serville. In 1764 he joined Father Juan de Escandón (1696-1772) to Buenos Aires. He travelled to Córdoba and then moved to the Rio de la Plata carrying with him silkworm eggs and mulberry seeds. He conducted experiments with silkworms and went to Paraguay to establish sericulture. Unable to grow mulberry, the silkworm experiments failed. He then worked with Florian Paucke in San Javier close to the Paraná River. Here he conducted experiments on electric eels and spider silk. He collected 2500 spiders and released them in the orchard and extracted an ounce of spider silk and repeated the experiment with 4155 spiders. Termeyer found a large spider in Santa Fe in 1766 which he was told had a lethal venom. He experimented with the spider on a lamb, chicken, cats and dogs and found that there was no truth to it. Termeyer examined the electric eel and conducted experiments and speculated on the organ that produced the electricity.

In 1767 Charles III expelled the Jesuits and Termeyer received information in 1767. He left in 1768 to Spain and then went to live in exile in Italy in Faenza. His home in Faenza had microscopes, telescopes, electrical instruments, and numerous instruments. He published some booklets which influenced the Duke of Grimaldi. With that influence he moved to Lombardy and lived from 1779 in Milan. He wrote to numerous societies, writing about the language of the Mocoví and on the spiders and insects that he had collected on his travels. He published a series of his studies in Opuscoli scelte sulle scienze e sulle arti and Scelta d’opuscoli interessanti which was published in 5 volumes in 1807. He was elected into the Reale Società Agraria di Torino and received a medal of the Società Patriottica di Milano.

Termeyer worked again on spider silk and had a relative Lucrezia Raspanti knit a pair of stockings from it. These were sent to Charles III on 30 May 1788 and weighted two ounces and a quarter. It was however lost during its transfer. In 1796 his home was destroyed during the French invasion. He then trained Carlo Someschi who made a shawl of spider silk for Josephine Beauharnais, gloves for Augusta Amalia of Bavaria, and a pair of stockings for Napoleon.

Termeyer's death is not recorded but he is last recorded living in 1814.
