= Paul Camboué =

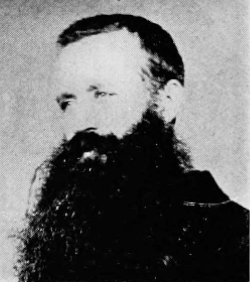
- Born: 22 April 1849; Mont-de-Marsan, France
- Died: July 1929 (aged 79–80); Madagascar
- Occupation(s): Clergyman, lawyer, arachnologist, entomologist

Paul Camboué (22 April 1849 – July 1929) was a French Jesuit priest, arachnologist, and entomologist.

== Life ==
Camboué was born in Mont-de-Marsan, France on 22 April 1849, and studied at the College of St. Joseph in Bordeaux at a middle school run by the Jesuits of Tivoli. He received his baccalaureate in science at the age of 16, and became a lawyer at the appellate court in Paris after getting a law degree. He served as a lieutenant in the Franco-Prussian War. In October 1872, he joined the novitiate of the Jesuits of Toulouse and was ordained in 1881.

He arrived in Madagascar on 10 November 1882, the place where he stayed for much of his life. He was a missionary, and worked in Arivonimamo and Ambohibeloma. He also became interested in Malagasy culture. He penned the article on "Madagascar" for the Catholic Encyclopedia. He was procurator in France of the Malagasy mission, and professor of the Malagasy language at the Catholic Institute in Paris.

He was involved in extracting spider silk; the Magasin Pittoresque commented that "Various attempts have been made at different times to utilize the thread of the spider, but to Father Camboné [sic], a French missionary to Madagascar, is due the credit of having first brought these attempts to a successful issue".

Camboué became an associate member of the Malagasy Academy on 12 November 1903 and a titular member on 29 June 1927. He was a corresponding member of the Académie des Sciences. For his scientific work, he received the Savigny prize in 1870, the Duseigneur-Kléber prize of the Lyons Chamber of Commerce, and the Saintour prize of the Académie des Sciences on 22 December 1924.

Alfred Grandidier's report to the Académie des Sciences prepared for the awarding of the Savigny prize described his scientific work; an excerpt is provided below:

The Reverend Father Camboué, a missionary in Madagascar for some eight years now, has been engaged in the zealous study of the invertebrate animals of the great island. He has dedicated all of the time available to him outside of his religious work to this task. He also had the wonderful idea of undertaking to establish a museum of natural science in Antananarivo. The present museum is still quite modest, but it has already been called upon to serve the needs of science.

Father Camboué has published interesting studies on the sericeous Bombycidae and the Acaridae of Madagascar, as well as on the useful and harmful spiders found there. He also discovered many new species in the various orders of the class of insects.

The ant fauna of Madagascar, which is known today to number more than one hundred species or races, is of particular interest. Camboué gathered a significant collection of those insects in their various states, and the collection has shed new light on the field of myrmecology.

Some of the many Hymenoptera that he sent are quite remarkable and reveal the existence of families that were unknown until then in Madagascar.

His collection of Coleoptera, in which each insect is given an indigenous name, is of particular interest for entomologists.

In addition to several newly discovered butterflies, we are also indebted to him for a description of the caterpillar and the chrysalis of the magnificent Urania Ripheus [sic], which has finally led to some definitive clarity about some of its affinities.

Furthermore, Camboué's studies have not been limited to invertebrate animals. He also discovered several new plants, and his studies of the Malagasy vine [or vineyard] are of genuine interest. In short, Father Camboué's efforts are worthy of praise and encouragement...

Also, the reports of Mr. Bouvier for the Saintour prize, and of Mr. Dusuzeau for the Duseigneur-Kléber prize underline the practical side of Camboué's research. Mr. Roland Legendre, in a 1967 note in the Bulletin de l'Académie Malgache, felt confident enough to call him the top arachnologist in Madagascar.

His writing on ethnology is also not without interest, in particular the work that draws attention to the sculptural art of Madagascar.

Paul Camboué died in Madagascar in July 1929.
