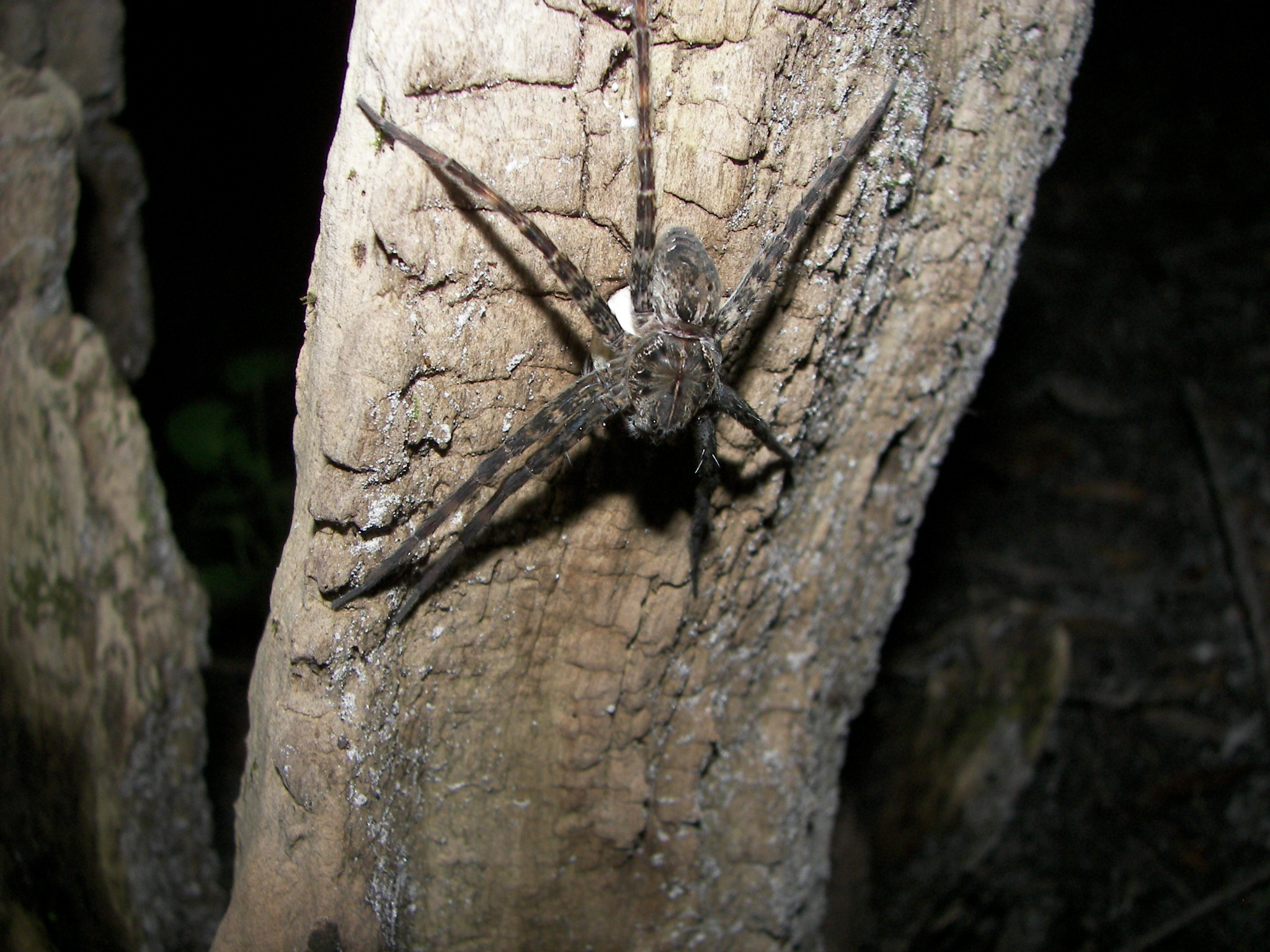

Scientific classification
- Kingdom: Animalia
- Phylum: Arthropoda
- Subphylum: Chelicerata
- Class: Arachnida
- Order: Araneae
- Infraorder: Araneomorphae
- Family: Dolomedidae
- Genus: Dolomedes
- Species: D. okefinokensis

Binomial name
- Dolomedes okefinokensis Bishop, 1924

Synonyms
- Dolomedes okefenokensis –Carico & Holt, 1964

= Dolomedes okefinokensis =

Species of spider

Dolomedes okefinokensis is a species of spider in the family Dolomedidae. The specific name okefinokensis refers to the Okefenokee Swamp.

== Range and habitat ==
Dolomedes okefinokensis is endemic the Southeastern United States in Georgia and Florida, possibly also in Alabama and Louisiana. It is associated with swampy areas and primarily feeds on aquatic insects, but also on small vertebrates.

== Description ==
The body length is about 30 mm (1.2 in) in females and about 8 mm (0.31 in) in males. It is difficult to distinguish from the slightly smaller Dolomedes tenebrosus.
