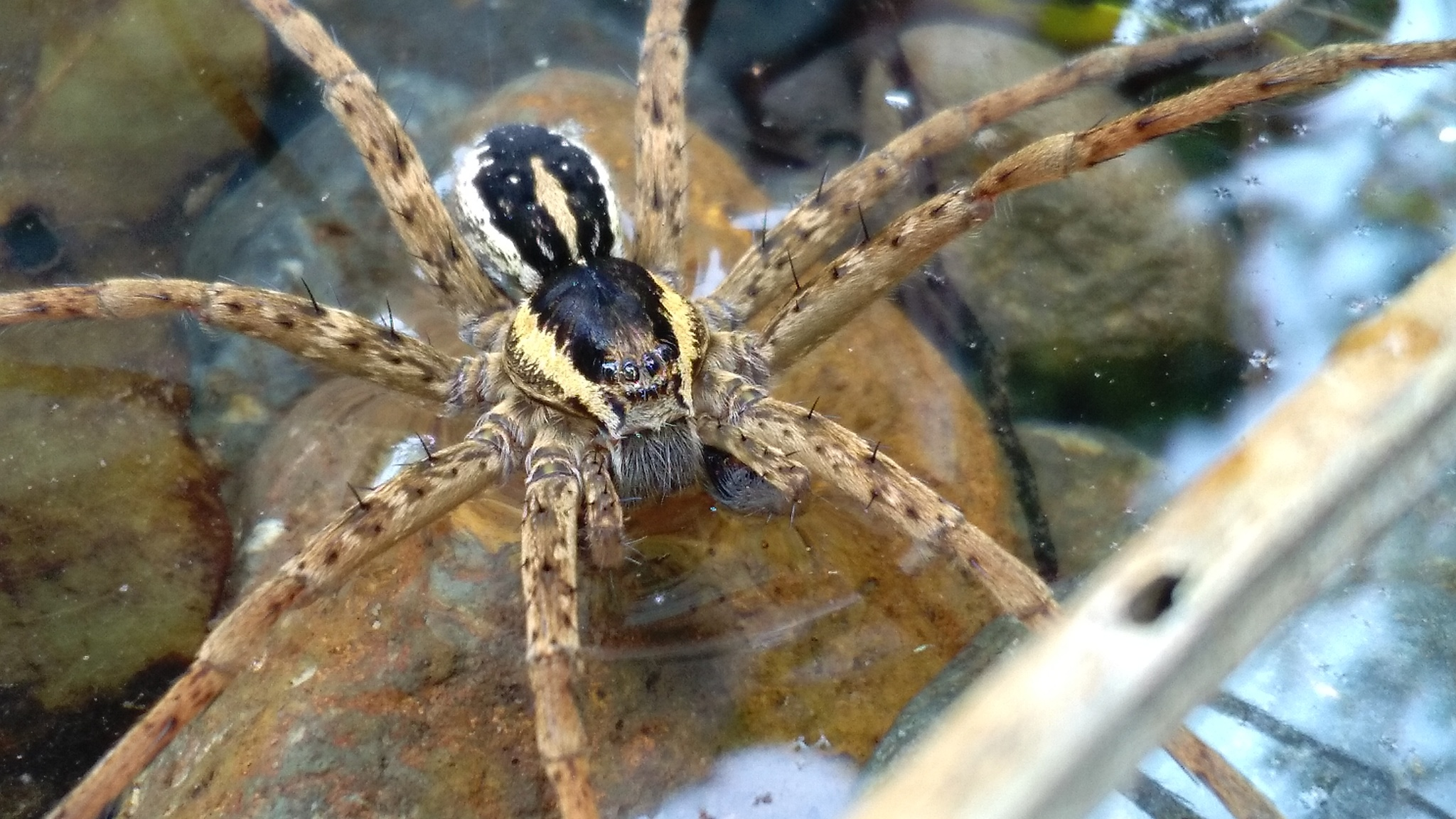
- At Kaimai-Mamaku Forest Park in Bay of Plenty

Conservation status
- Not Threatened (NZ TCS)

Scientific classification
- Kingdom: Animalia
- Phylum: Arthropoda
- Subphylum: Chelicerata
- Class: Arachnida
- Order: Araneae
- Infraorder: Araneomorphae
- Family: Dolomedidae
- Genus: Dolomedes
- Species: D. dondalei

Binomial name
- Dolomedes dondalei Vink & Dupérré, 2010

= Dolomedes dondalei =

Species of spider endemic to New Zealand

Dolomedes dondalei is a species of large fishing spider endemic to the main islands of New Zealand. It is a nocturnal hunter, feeling the water surface for vibrations, and catches insects and even small fishes – the only New Zealand Dolomedes species able to do so.

== Taxonomy ==
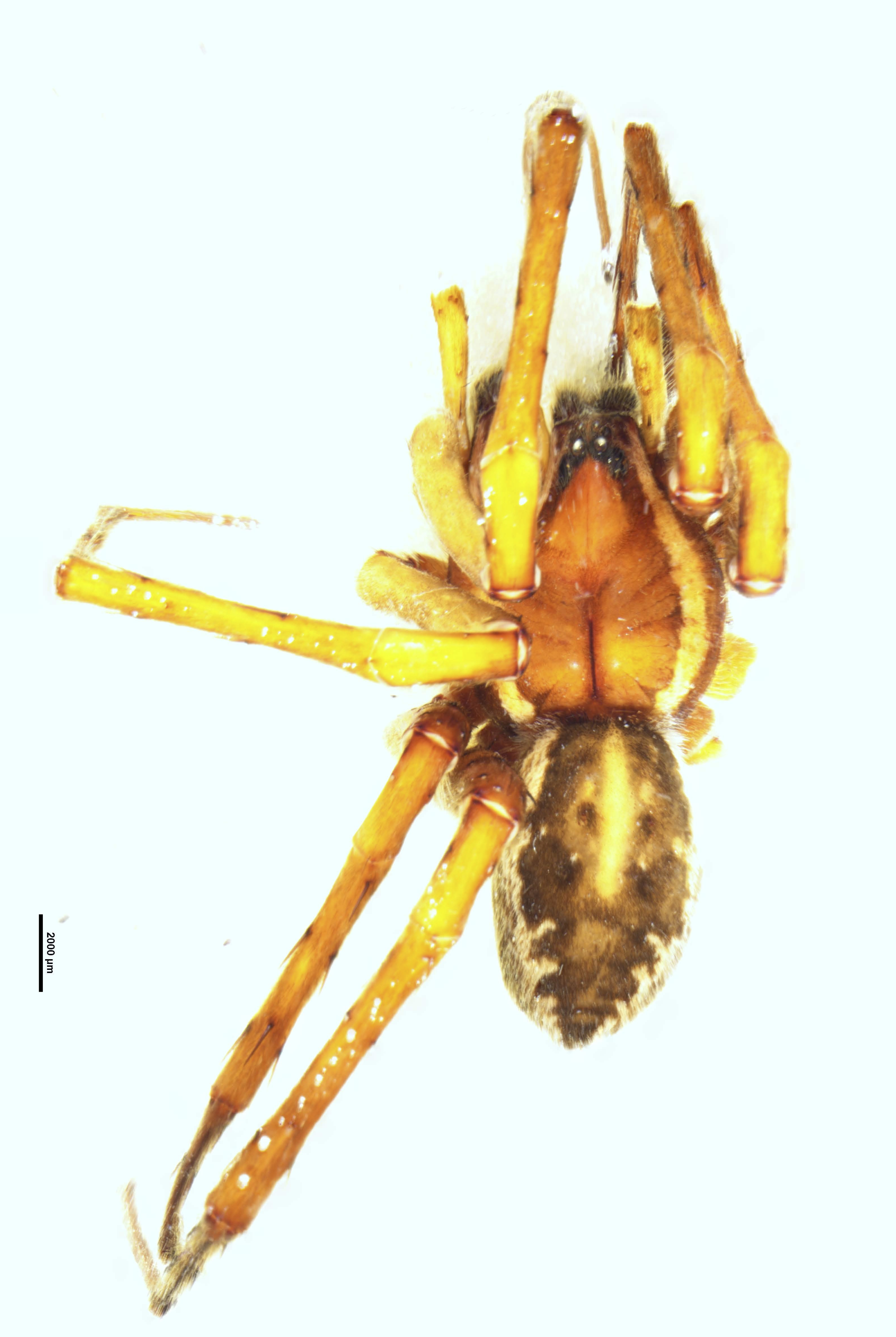
Holotype male, Lincoln University

D. dondalei was known as Dolomedes III for some time before being named and described by Cor J. Vink and Nadine Dupérré in 2010. The male type specimen of this species is held in the Lincoln University Entomology Research Collection and was collected by Vink on Banks Peninsula, near Barrys Bay, in 2003. The species was named in honour of spider taxonomist Dr Charles Dondale, to recognise the support he gave to both authors and his work on the taxonomy of the family Pisauridae.

== Description ==
This species is one of four species of Dolomedes found in New Zealand, and grows up to 7 cm across, including legs. It has yellow stripes down its cephalothorax, which is dark orange-brown where D. aquaticus is grey. It has distinctive features of the male pedipalps and female genitalia, but can easily be distinguished from other Dolomedes species by the stripes down each side of the abdomen, which are light yellow-brown with several patches extending a little way towards the midline. Body length is 12–18 mm in males, 18–25 mm in females. Because they weigh less than a gram and are covered with hydrophobic hairs, these spiders can walk on the water surface without sinking.

== Range and habitat ==
D. dondalei is endemic to New Zealand, and is found throughout the North and South Islands.

Unlike the closely related D. aquaticus, which is found in open riverbeds and lake shores, D. dondalei prefers shaded waterways with native forest or dense vegetation. It lives under rocks close to rivers. Adults are most commonly seen in December and January.

== Ecology ==
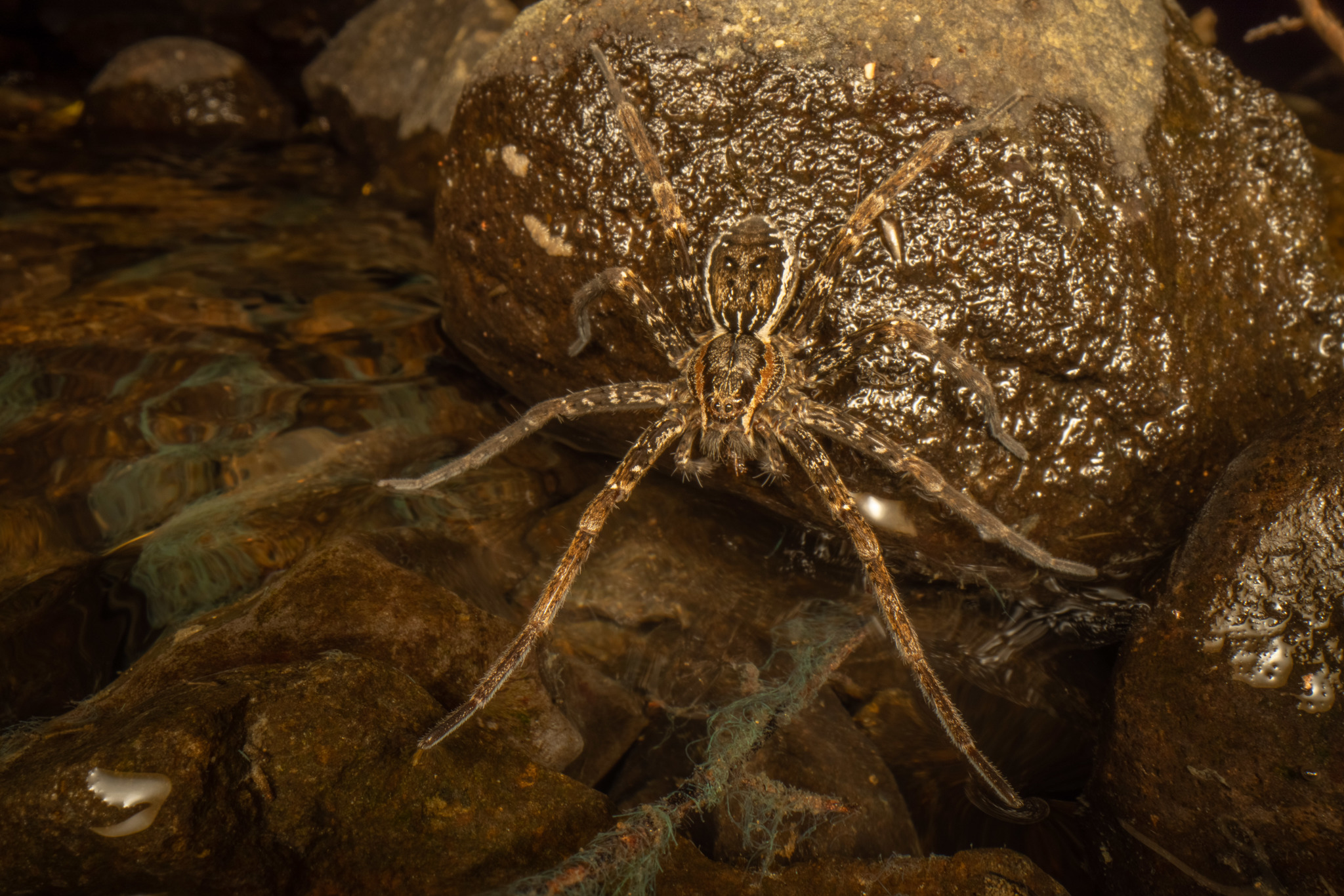
Hunting at the water's edge

D. dondalei is nocturnal, most active two hours after dusk, and hiding under stones and logs in the daytime. It hunts at the edge of the water at night, placing its legs on the water surface, or anchoring itself to the shore with its back legs with the rest of the body floating, and feeling for vibrations with long sensory hairs on its legs. It then ventures out on the water surface, resting on the surface tension, and can use a silk dragline to stop itself overshooting the target. This lets it catch insects and even small fish—the only one of New Zealand's Dolomedes species able to do this in laboratory experiments. To escape predators it dives underwater and hides between stones: it can survive underwater for half an hour, using air trapped on the hairy surface of its body.

D. dondalei is cannibalistic, opportunistically eating other spiders, and females sometimes eat smaller males after they mate – or lure them to be eaten, even if the female has already mated. Males may possibly mate with newly moulted virgin females to avoid sexual cannibalism. Females carry the eggsac in their chelicerae and build a nursery web between river stones or in vegetation beside streams.

This species is attacked by parasitic wasps (Cryptocheilus australis and Sphictostethus nitidus, family Pompiliidae) which paralyses them, sometimes even pursuing them underwater, and drags them to a nest to feed its larva. Their eggsacs are a large part of the diet of nestling fernbirds (Poodytes punctatus).

== Conservation status ==
Under the New Zealand Threat Classification System, this species is listed as "Not Threatened".

== Gallery ==
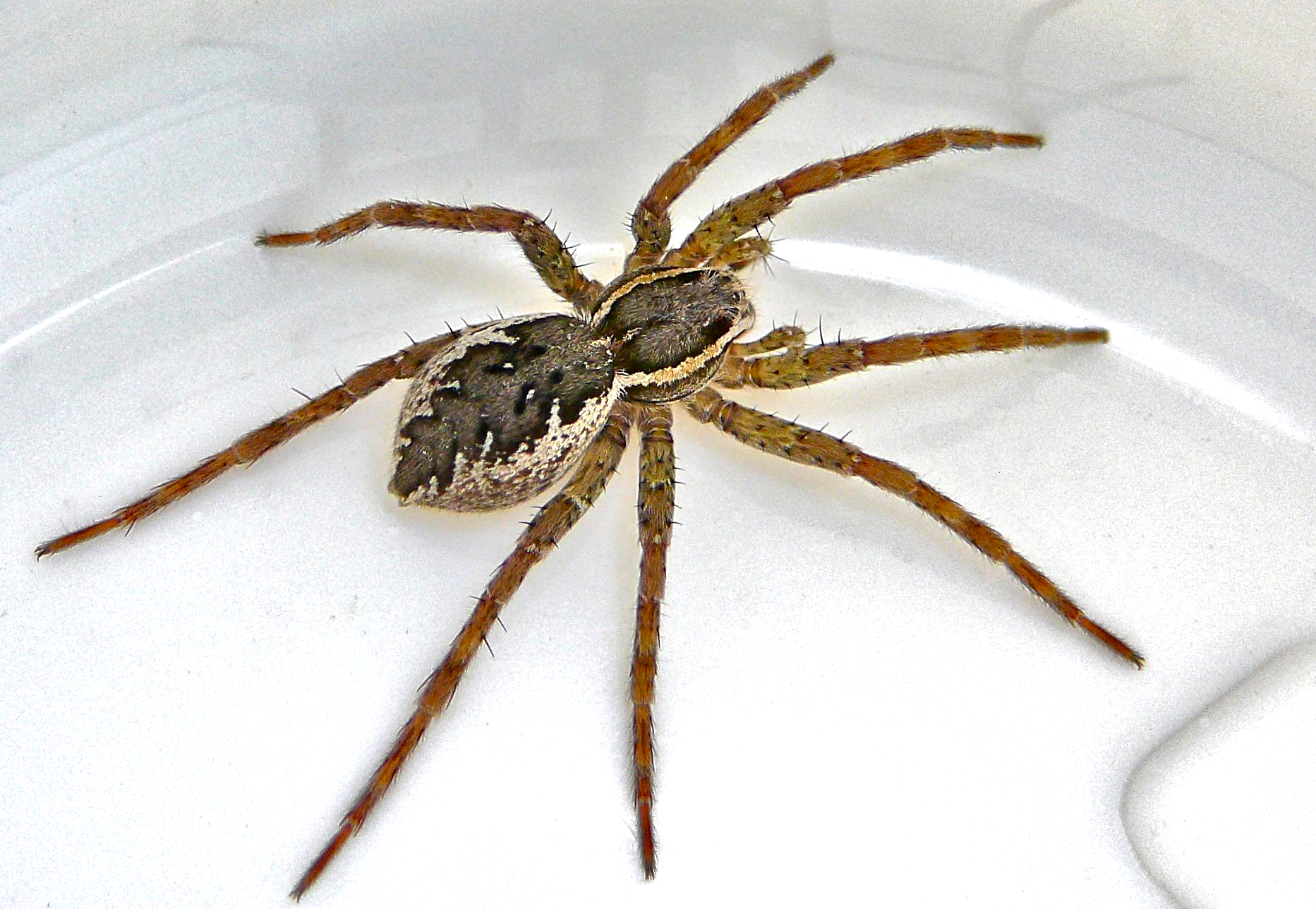

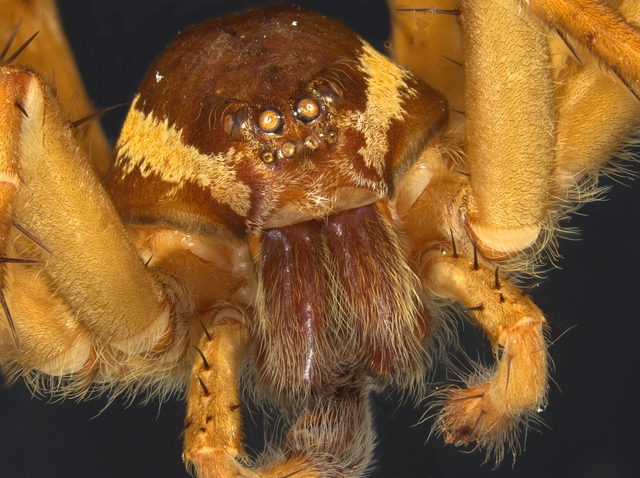

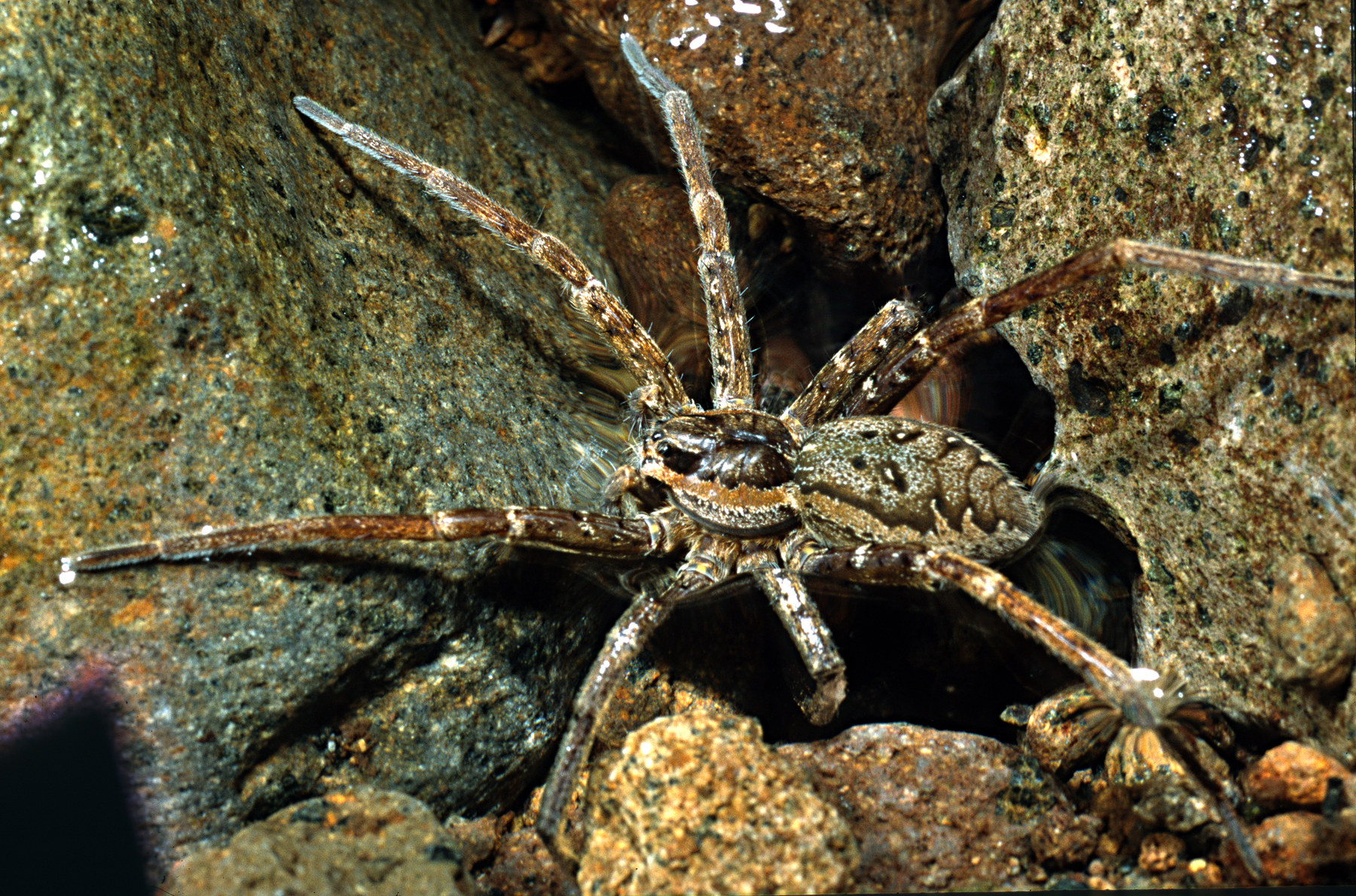
