= Ganghwa Maehwamarum Habitat =

Habitat in Ganghwa County, Incheon

- Location within South Korea
- Location: South Korea
- Coordinates: 37.62°N 126.52°E

Ramsar Wetland
- Designated: 13 October 2008
- Reference no.: 1846

Ganghwa Maehwamarum Habitat is located at Choji-ri, Gilsang-myun, Ganghwa-gun, Incheon Metropolitan city, South Korea. Maehwamarum (Ranunculus kazusensis Makino) is a plant that grows in a swamp or a lake and it is about 50 cm tall. Until the 1960s, maehwamarum was very abundant and easily seen. However, due to pollution and demolition of ponds and wetlands, it is now found only in 30 places in Korea. And one of these is Ganghwa Maehwamarum Habitat.

== Significance ==
It is very significant that Ganghwa Maehwamarum Habitat is registered at Ramsar Wetland. Ganghwa Maehwamarum Habitat is a rice paddy which is a man-made wetlands. But despite the fact that it is man-made, it became the first rice paddy to be formally registered as a Ramsar Wetland. This became possible in the 10th Ramsar Conference which recognized the importance and the need of rice paddies in Asia. Ganghwa Maehwamarum Habitat has led other rice paddies being designated as Ramsar Wetlands.

== Public conservation movement ==
Growth of maehwamarum, once thought extinct, was discovered on Ganghwa Island lands which were slated for redevelopment. Knowing the importance of preserving rare plants, the National Trust intervened and acquired the land. The National Trust is run by public contributions and aims to protect ecologically important areas by buying the land and protecting it from other commercial acts. Although the Maehwamarum Habitat is small compared to other wetlands, it was designated as Ramsar Wetland for continuous preservation.

== Organisms ==
Plants

- Maehwamarum (Korean water crowfoot; Ranunculus kazusensis)
- Schoenoplectus tabernaemontani

Animals

- Black-faced spoonbill
- Chinese egret
- Gold-spotted pond frog (Rana plancyi chosenica)
- Korean brown frog (Rana coreana)
- Boreal digging frog (Kaloula borealis)
- Korean ratsnake (Elaphe schrenckii)
- Nepa hoffmanni
- Many kind of wolf spiders, such as Dolomedes sulfureus
- Rice paddy snails
- Water snails
- Crucian carp
- Mudfish
- Rice eel (Monopterus albus)

Introduced

- Banded bull frog
- Largemouth bass
