= Dolomedes gertschi =

Scientific classification
- Kingdom: Animalia
- Phylum: Arthropoda
- Subphylum: Chelicerata
- Class: Arachnida
- Order: Araneae
- Infraorder: Araneomorphae
- Family: Dolomedidae
- Genus: Dolomedes
- Species: D. gertschi

Binomial name
- Dolomedes gertschi Carico, 1973

Species of spider

Dolomedes gertschi is a species of fishing spider in the family Dolomedidae. It is found in the United States.

== Taxonomy ==
Dolomedes gertschi is closely related to Dolomedes scriptus. This is based on similarities of both their colour patterns and the tibial apophyses of the males. The species differ from each other by their palpi.

== Range ==
In the first description of the species in 1973, it was said to only exist in the mesic parts of the Gila River drainage in Arizona and New Mexico. Current recorded observations in GBIF suggests that this still is the case.
