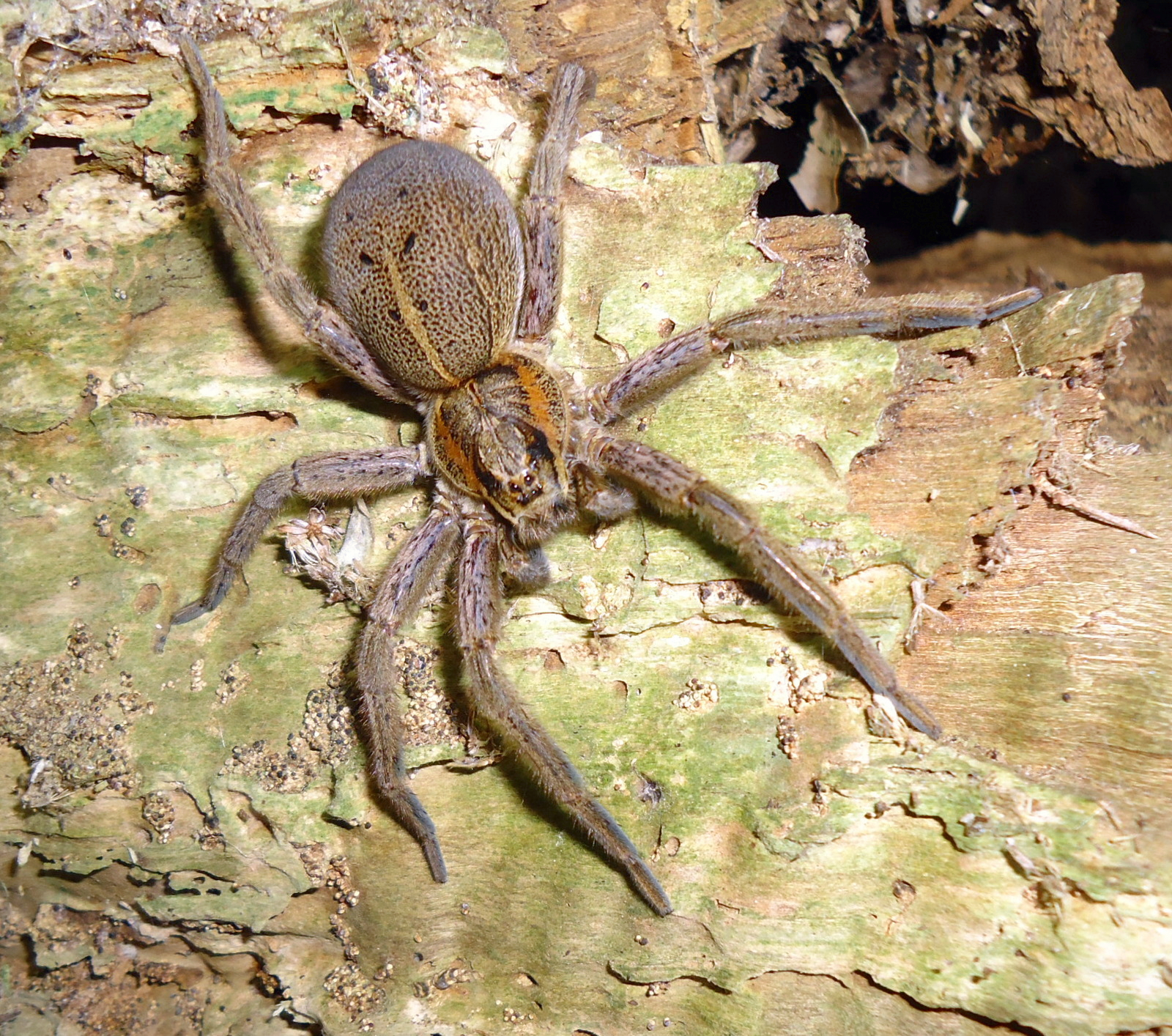
- Rangatira spider on Mangere Island, New Zealand

Conservation status
- Relict (NZ TCS)

Scientific classification
- Kingdom: Animalia
- Phylum: Arthropoda
- Subphylum: Chelicerata
- Class: Arachnida
- Order: Araneae
- Infraorder: Araneomorphae
- Family: Dolomedidae
- Genus: Dolomedes
- Species: D. schauinslandi

Binomial name
- Dolomedes schauinslandi Simon, 1899

Synonyms
- Dolomedes huttoni Dolomedes trippi

= Dolomedes schauinslandi =

Species of spider

Dolomedes schauinslandi or the Rangatira spider is a large spider of the family Dolomedidae. It is only found on South East Island (Rangatira), Houruakopara and Mangere Islands in the Chatham Islands, New Zealand. It is one of New Zealand's largest and rarest spiders.

== Taxonomy ==
This species was described in 1899 by Eugène Simon from female specimens. It was most recently revised in 2010. One of the syntypes is stored in Senckenberg Museum under registration number 9904979-RII/4979-137.

== Description ==
This large Dolomedes spider has been described as "one of the biggest and most robust species of the genus Dolomedes". This species demonstrates sexual dimorphism, with male body lengths of 18.6–26.0 millimetres (0.73–1.02 in) and females of 23.3–30.2 millimetres (0.92–1.19 in). Both males and females are substantially larger than other New Zealand Dolomedes species. The carapace and legs are red-brown with orange stripes on the centre and sides of the abdomen. They have bright eye shine and can be spotted at night from 20 metres away.

== Ecology ==
D. schauinslandi is active at night in forest and scrubland habitat, where it hunts for wētā on the forest floor or tree trunks. Its predators may include mice and weka, which would explain its absence from Pitt Island, where it was described as common in the original species description. Mating has not been observed, but females have been observed carrying egg sacs in their chelicerae in November and December and guarding their nursery from December to February, as would be expected for a nursery web spider.

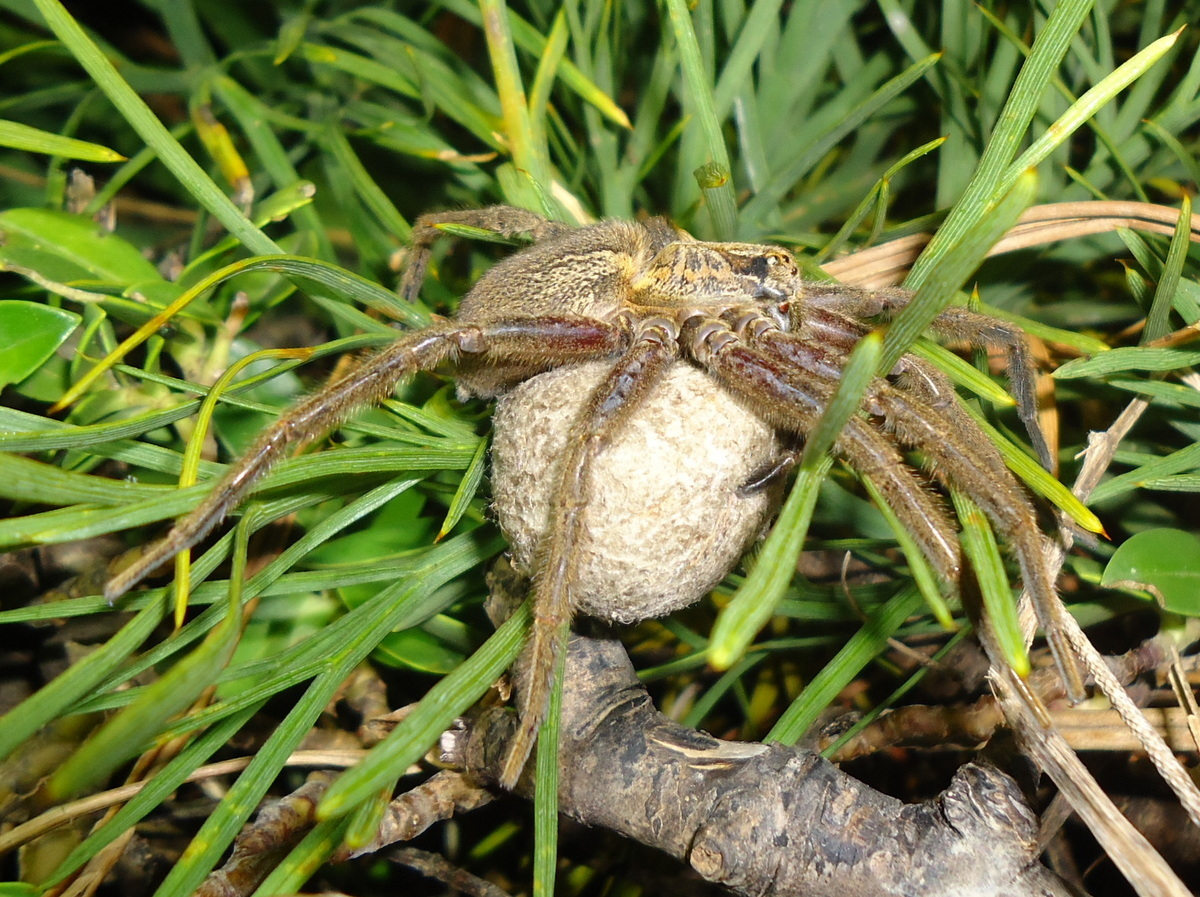
Female Dolomedes schauinslandi carrying egg sac.

== Conservation ==
This species, the only Dolomedes known from the Chatham Islands, is classified as having a relict population status, due to it surviving in less than 10% of its previously known habitat. It was probably present on the main Chatham Island prior to human settlement, as it is found on mouse-free Houruakopara Island which is only 200 m offshore. The other two islands in its current range, Mangere and Rangatira, are now free of introduced mammals and have restricted access to maintain their predator-free status; Rangatira was farmed up to the 1960s, but cats, mice, and rats were never introduced there.

The Rangatira spider was first described from specimens collected on Pitt Island, but despite substantial surveys it has not been seen there since the early 1900s. Mice, which are known spider predators, were accidentally introduced to Pitt some time before 1951, and may have driven D. schauinslandi extinct there. It is possible that this species could re-establish itself on Pitt Island, if there was suitable predator-free habitat (Pitt Island has mice but not rats); spiderlings lift their abdomens when exposed to a breeze in the lab, which is a behaviour associated with aerial travel by ballooning.

== Conservation status ==
Under the New Zealand Threat Classification System, this species is listed as "Relict" with the qualifiers of "Conservation Dependent" and "Island Endemic". This species is vulnerable to mice.
