= Dolomedes karschi =

Scientific classification
- Kingdom: Animalia
- Phylum: Arthropoda
- Subphylum: Chelicerata
- Class: Arachnida
- Order: Araneae
- Infraorder: Araneomorphae
- Family: Dolomedidae
- Genus: Dolomedes
- Species: D. karschi

Binomial name
- Dolomedes karschi Strand, 1913

Species of spider

Dolomedes karschi is a species of spider of the genus Dolomedes. It is endemic to Sri Lanka.
