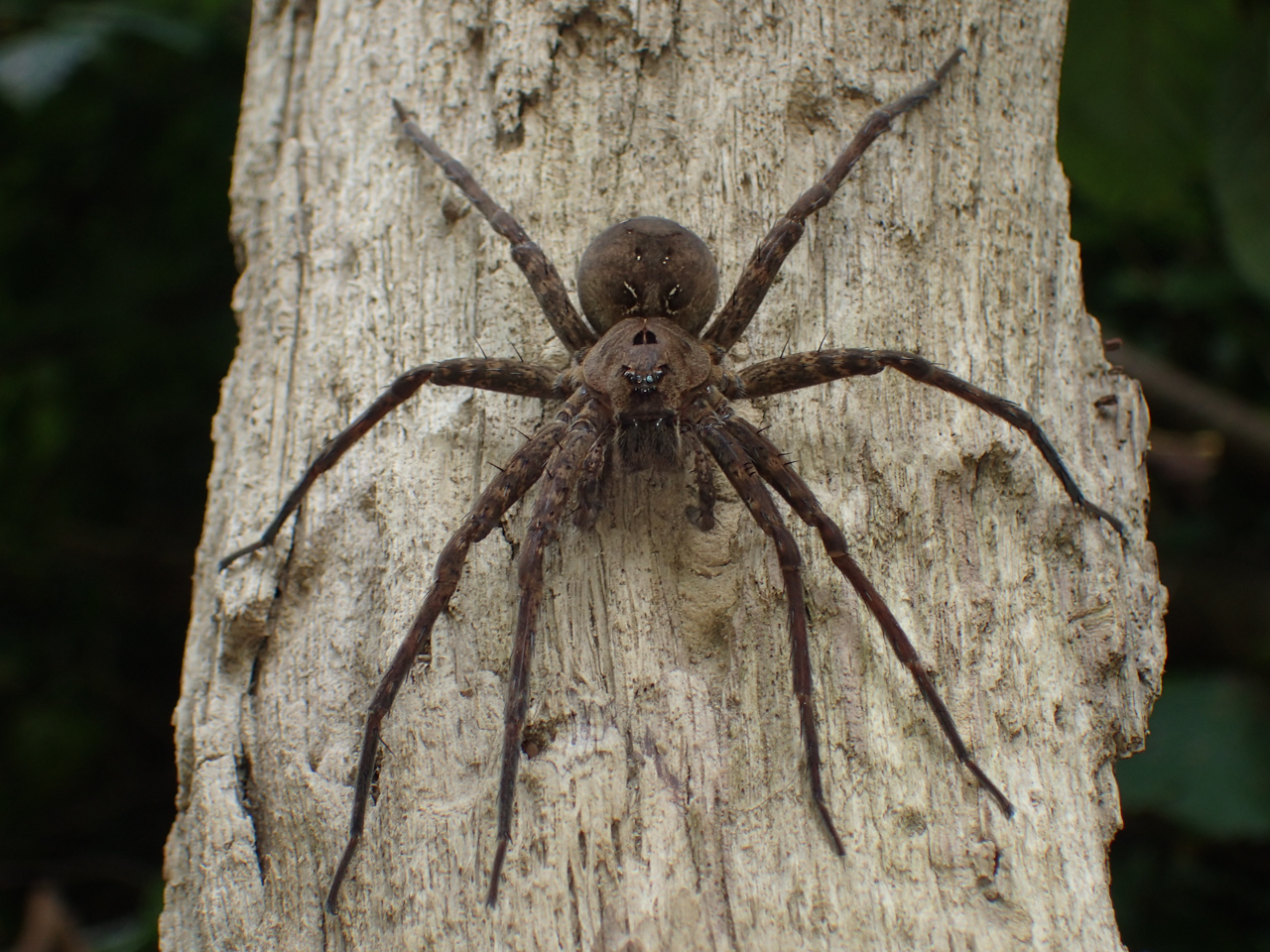

Scientific classification
- Domain: Eukaryota
- Kingdom: Animalia
- Phylum: Arthropoda
- Subphylum: Chelicerata
- Class: Arachnida
- Order: Araneae
- Infraorder: Araneomorphae
- Family: Dolomedidae
- Genus: Dolomedes
- Species: D. vittatus

Binomial name
- Dolomedes vittatus Walckenaer, 1837

= Dolomedes vittatus =

Species of spider

Dolomedes vittatus is a species of spider in the family Dolomedidae. It is found in the United States.
