= Dolomedes elegans =

Scientific classification
- Domain: Eukaryota
- Kingdom: Animalia
- Phylum: Arthropoda
- Subphylum: Chelicerata
- Class: Arachnida
- Order: Araneae
- Infraorder: Araneomorphae
- Family: Dolomedidae
- Genus: Dolomedes
- Species: D. elegans

Binomial name
- Dolomedes elegans Taczanowski, 1874

Species of spider

Dolomedes elegans is a species of spider in the family Dolomedidae, found in French Guiana.

Another species described two years after the original, initially named Dolomedes elegans L. Koch, 1876, and later named Nilus kochi is now considered as Mangromedes kochi, and is found in Queensland, Australia.
