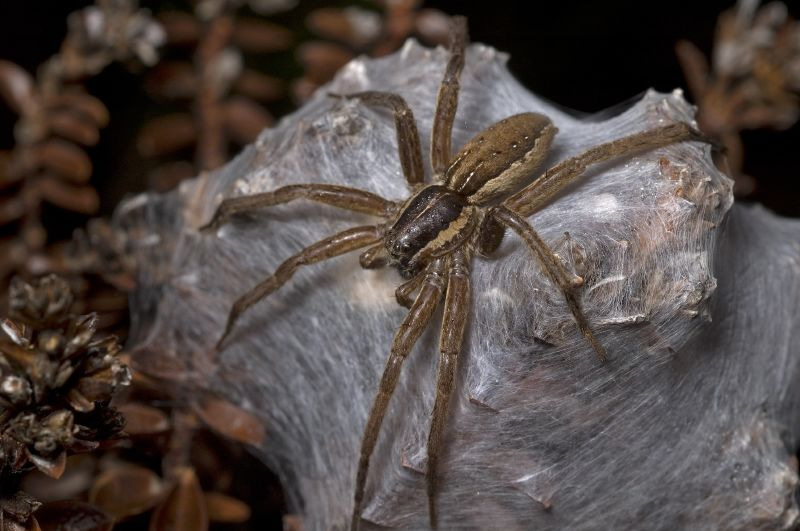
- Female guarding nursery web

Conservation status
- Not Threatened (NZ TCS)

Scientific classification
- Kingdom: Animalia
- Phylum: Arthropoda
- Subphylum: Chelicerata
- Class: Arachnida
- Order: Araneae
- Infraorder: Araneomorphae
- Family: Dolomedidae
- Genus: Dolomedes
- Species: D. minor

Binomial name
- Dolomedes minor (L. Koch, 1876)

= Dolomedes minor =

Species of spider

Dolomedes minor is a semiaquatic spider in the family Dolomedidae that is endemic to New Zealand, where it is known as the nursery web spider, not to be confused with the family Pisauridae.

== Identification ==
Dolomedes minor is pale brown to grey, like the rocks around which they live, helping to camouflage them against predators. The spider has large pedipalps, which are usually used for sensory purposes. The female D. minor can easily be identified based on the position of the epigyne on the underside of the abdomen. They possess large chelicerae, which are located just below the eyes. The spider has a body length of about 18 mm. The females are almost twice the size of the males. They move very fast and possess a long leg-span: over sixty millimeters for a fully grown female.

== Habitat ==
D. minor is found in a variety of habitats throughout New Zealand. They survive in a variety of terrains, from sea level up to subalpine areas, including shrubland containing gorse (Ulex europaeus) and mānuka (Leptospermum scoparium), swamps and grasslands. When hunting, they can be seen waiting around the water's edge and active amongst the stones, although they are nocturnal hunters. The spider is noticeable in these areas due to the large white nests thickly webbed to the ends of plants throughout these regions. Females will usually remain with their young in these habitats once their nursery webs have been constructed.

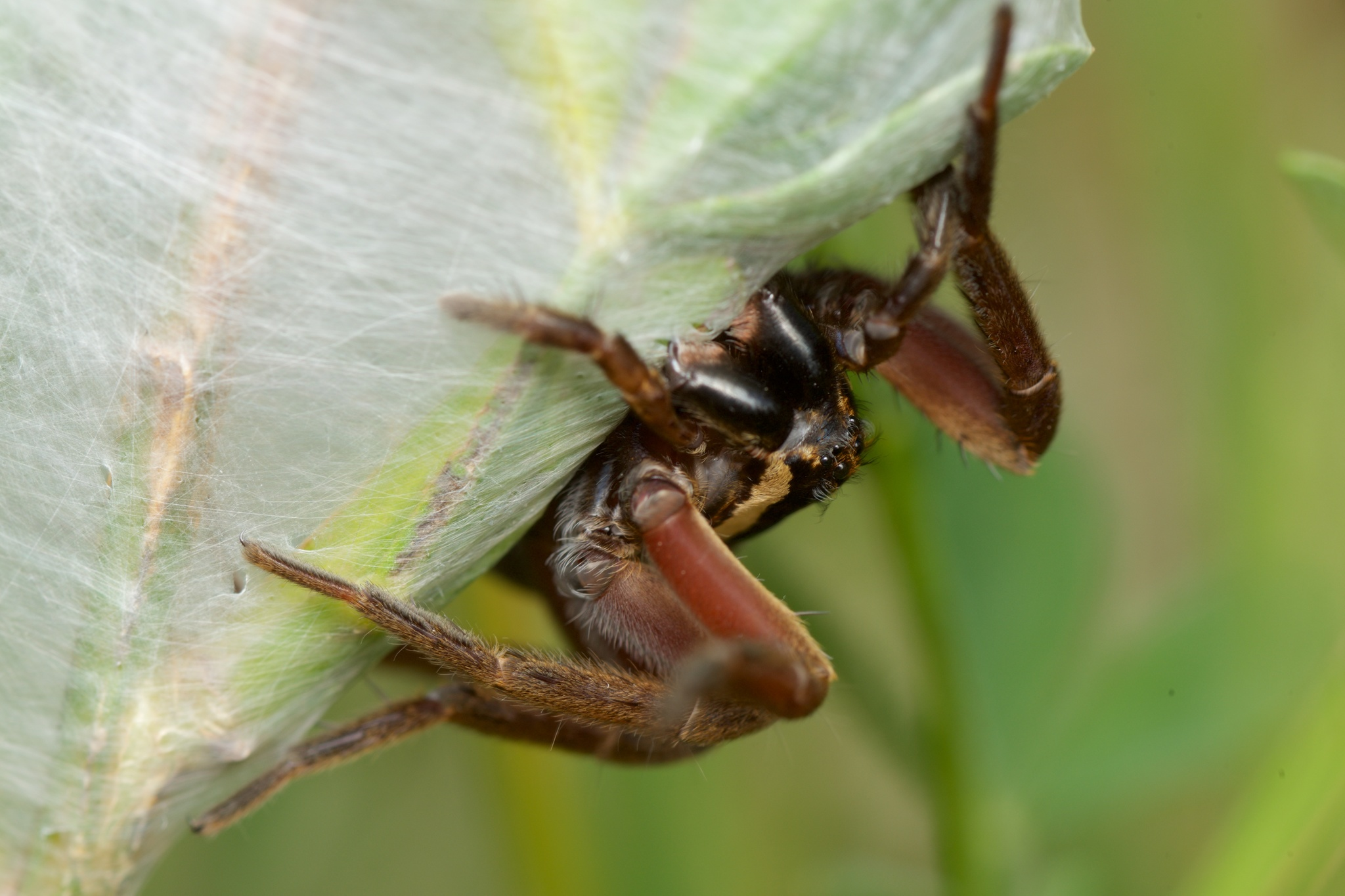
Dolomedes minor on its nest.

== Life cycle and phenology ==
D. minor are most commonly seen through the summer months from November to May. Over these months the females have been found with egg-sacs attached to them which are carried for at least 5 weeks beneath the spider in their chelicerae. After this the female will start to construct her nursery web, which is not made to catch prey but to ‘nurse’ young. This is made at night and built at and amongst the tips of foliage. It can be around 6 inches (150 mm) or more in length. At night the females guard the web and during the day have been noted to move towards the base of the vegetation. The spiderlings will emerge shortly after the web's construction, usually within a week or after they have moulted, and after two weeks most young leave the nest. It is presumed this is done by ballooning, a type of air dispersal to allow them to leave the nest. There has been sightings of adult males with young adult females, but no courtship or mating has been recorded. In other Dolomedes species, sexual cannibalism is high so it is possible that D. minor males will try mate with virgin females to avoid this. Hurried copulation has also been found to be common in other Dolomedes species.

== Diet and predators ==
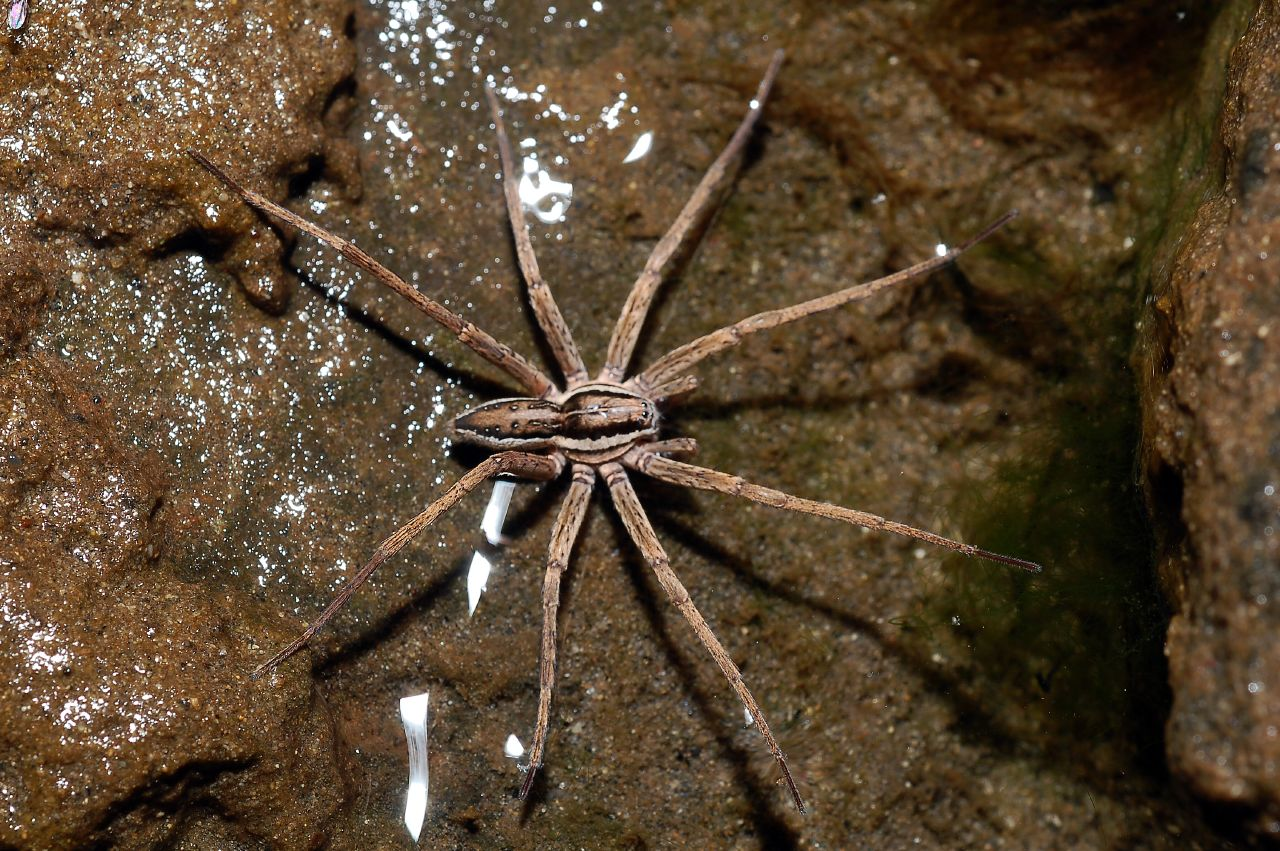
Male, demonstrating the ability to walk on water

As a nocturnal species, D. minor hunts and scavenges for food at night. The prey spectrum of the spider consists of a variety of small organisms including locusts, other spiders, dobsonfly larvae, earthworms, bees and other small insects. Although D. minor is an effective hunter, previously deceased organisms will also be accepted as food. The spider does not use its web at any point during predation, but rather captures prey through methods of hunting. The spider tends to take a passive approach to hunting however, waiting for prey to make contact with it before attacking. Despite having four prominent posterior eyes, D. minor relies entirely on touch and chemical perception rather than sight in the detection of prey. These senses are facilitated by hair sensilla on the spiders body that allow them to detect and capture prey with no reliance on sight. A particular feeding behaviour exhibited by D. minor is the rapid consumption of prey when it is available. Individuals of the species have been observed capturing additional prey whilst still feeding on previously taken organisms, as well as commonly capturing and holding multiple insects at a time. This behaviour is thought to have a direct correlation with the nocturnal instinct of D. minor, with the need for rapid consumption stemming from the limited availability of prey at night. The number of active insects decreases rapidly after twilight and remains limited until a spike before dawn, this leaves the spiders with only small windows of time in which to capture sufficient prey to nourish themselves. Individuals of D. minor are parasitised by two species of spider wasps, Cryptocheilus australis and Sphictostethus nitidus.

== Conservation status ==
Under the New Zealand Threat Classification System, this species is listed as "Not Threatened".
