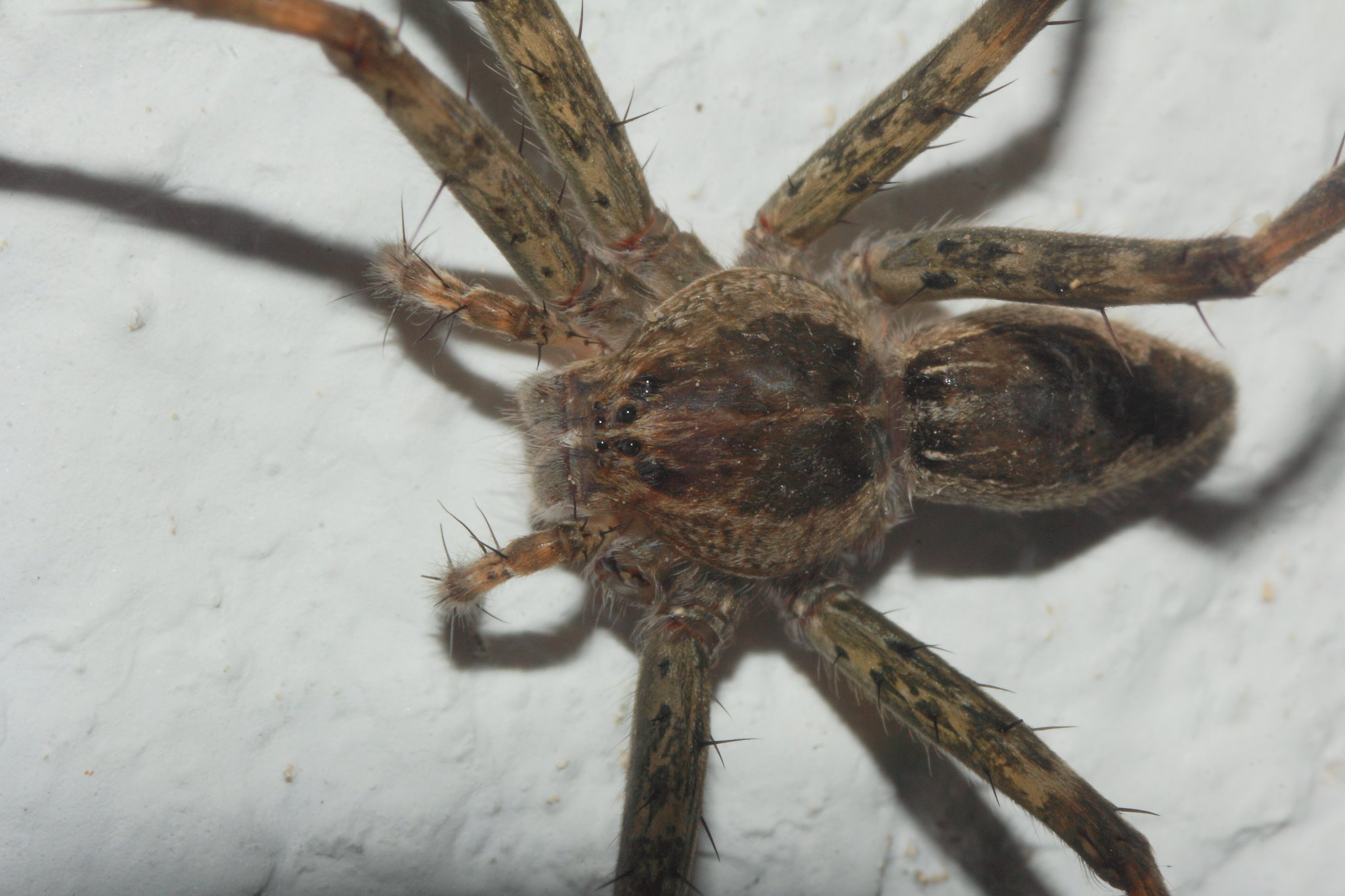

Scientific classification
- Domain: Eukaryota
- Kingdom: Animalia
- Phylum: Arthropoda
- Subphylum: Chelicerata
- Class: Arachnida
- Order: Araneae
- Infraorder: Araneomorphae
- Family: Dolomedidae
- Genus: Dolomedes
- Species: D. holti

Binomial name
- Dolomedes holti Carico, 1973

= Dolomedes holti =

Species of spider

Dolomedes holti is a species of large fishing spider in the genus Dolomedes that inhabits the Nearctic realm and was formally described in 1973 in Mexico.
