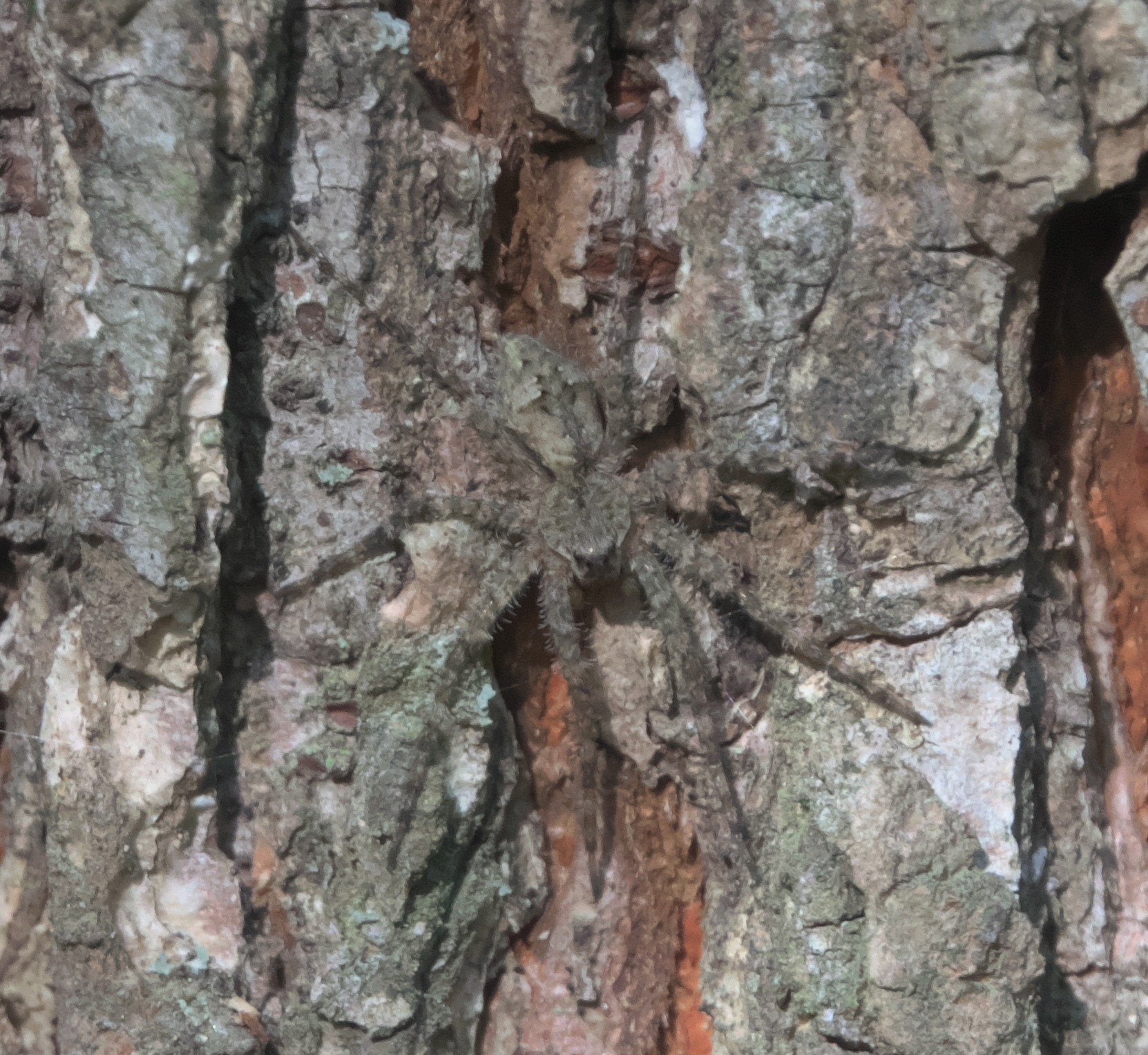
- Dolomedes albineus from Mayes County, Oklahoma

Scientific classification
- Domain: Eukaryota
- Kingdom: Animalia
- Phylum: Arthropoda
- Subphylum: Chelicerata
- Class: Arachnida
- Order: Araneae
- Infraorder: Araneomorphae
- Family: Dolomedidae
- Genus: Dolomedes
- Species: D. albineus

Binomial name
- Dolomedes albineus Hentz, 1845

= Dolomedes albineus =

Species of spider

Dolomedes albineus, the white-banded fishing spider, is a species of spider in the family Dolomedidae. It is found in the United States. Like most Dolomedes, this spider tends to hunt at or in streams and ponds. It has special hairs that repel water, allowing it to walk on water, and trap an air bubble on its abdomen to dive and swim, so that it can hunt tadpoles and aquatic invertebrates.
