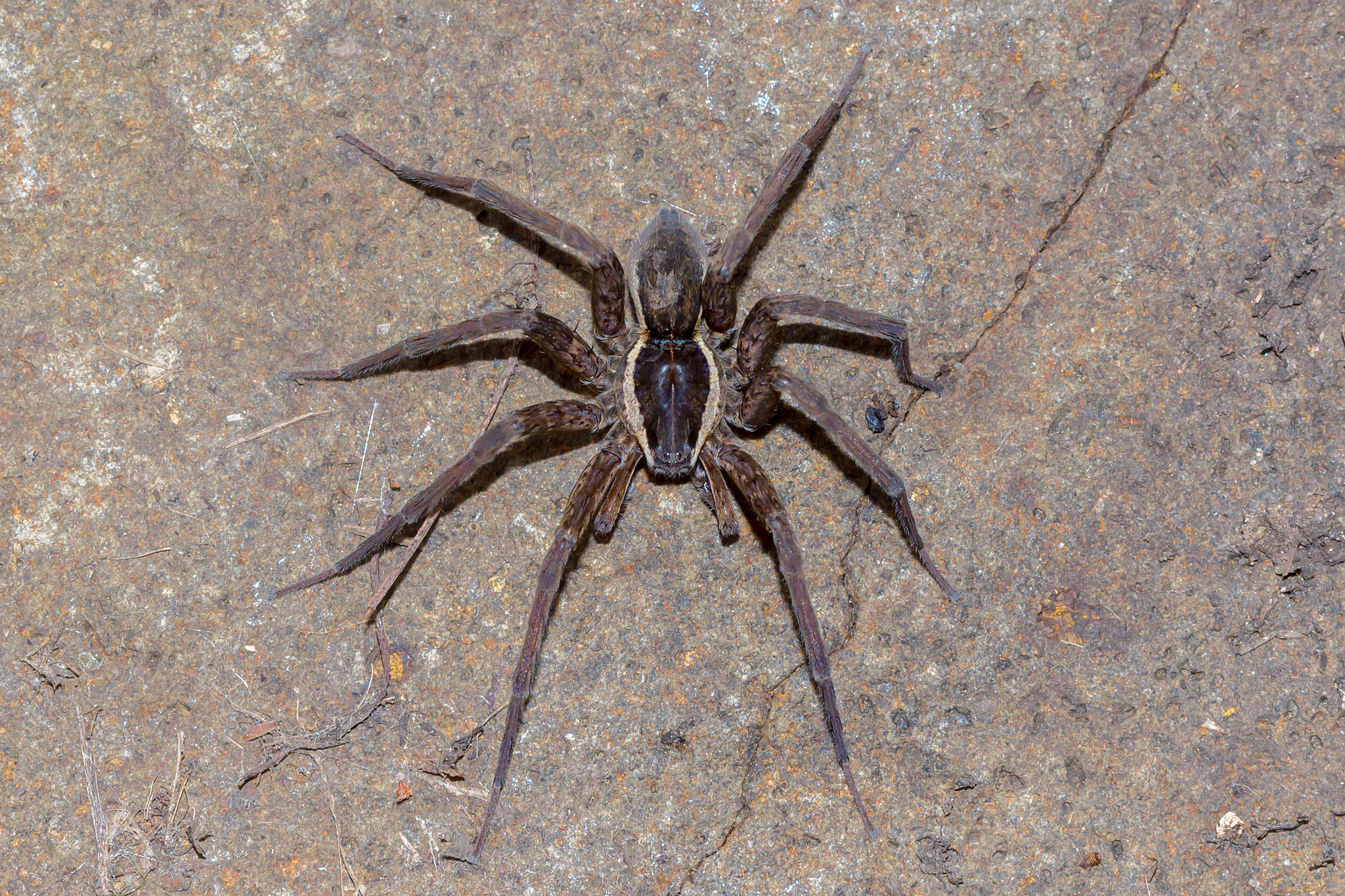

Scientific classification
- Kingdom: Animalia
- Phylum: Arthropoda
- Subphylum: Chelicerata
- Class: Arachnida
- Order: Araneae
- Infraorder: Araneomorphae
- Family: Dolomedidae
- Genus: Dolomedes
- Species: D. instabilis

Binomial name
- Dolomedes instabilis L.Koch 1876

Synonyms
- Dolomedes habilis

= Dolomedes instabilis =

Species of spider

Dolomedes instabilis is a species of fishing spider found in Australia. Often seen on the surface of fresh water, preferring ponds and lakes to rivers and creeks. Hunting techniques include submerging underwater to catch prey such as insects and tadpoles. Leg span is up to 70mm.

The species has three lines running front to back, they may be beige to orange in color. The species appears to get darker as it ages. Despite being adapted in many ways to the water, this species can also traverse quickly on land. Like many members of its family and similar to many wolf spiders and huntsmen, it remains still when faced with a predator but will run away if touched or provoked rather than attempt to bite.
