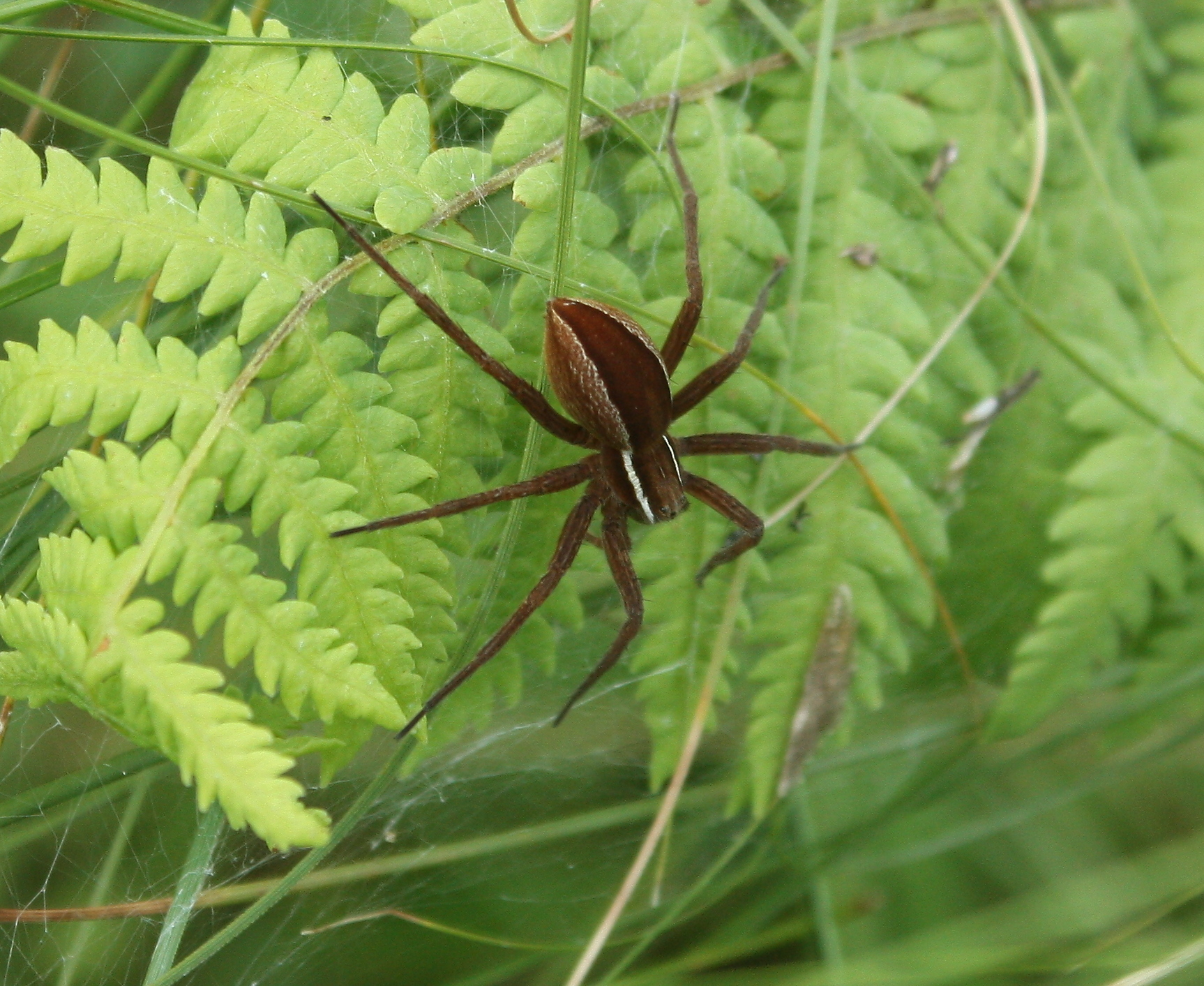

Conservation status
- Secure (NatureServe)

Scientific classification
- Kingdom: Animalia
- Phylum: Arthropoda
- Subphylum: Chelicerata
- Class: Arachnida
- Order: Araneae
- Infraorder: Araneomorphae
- Family: Dolomedidae
- Genus: Dolomedes
- Species: D. striatus

Binomial name
- Dolomedes striatus Giebel, 1869

= Dolomedes striatus =

Species of spider

Dolomedes striatus is a species of spider in the family Dolomedidae. It is found in the United States and Canada.

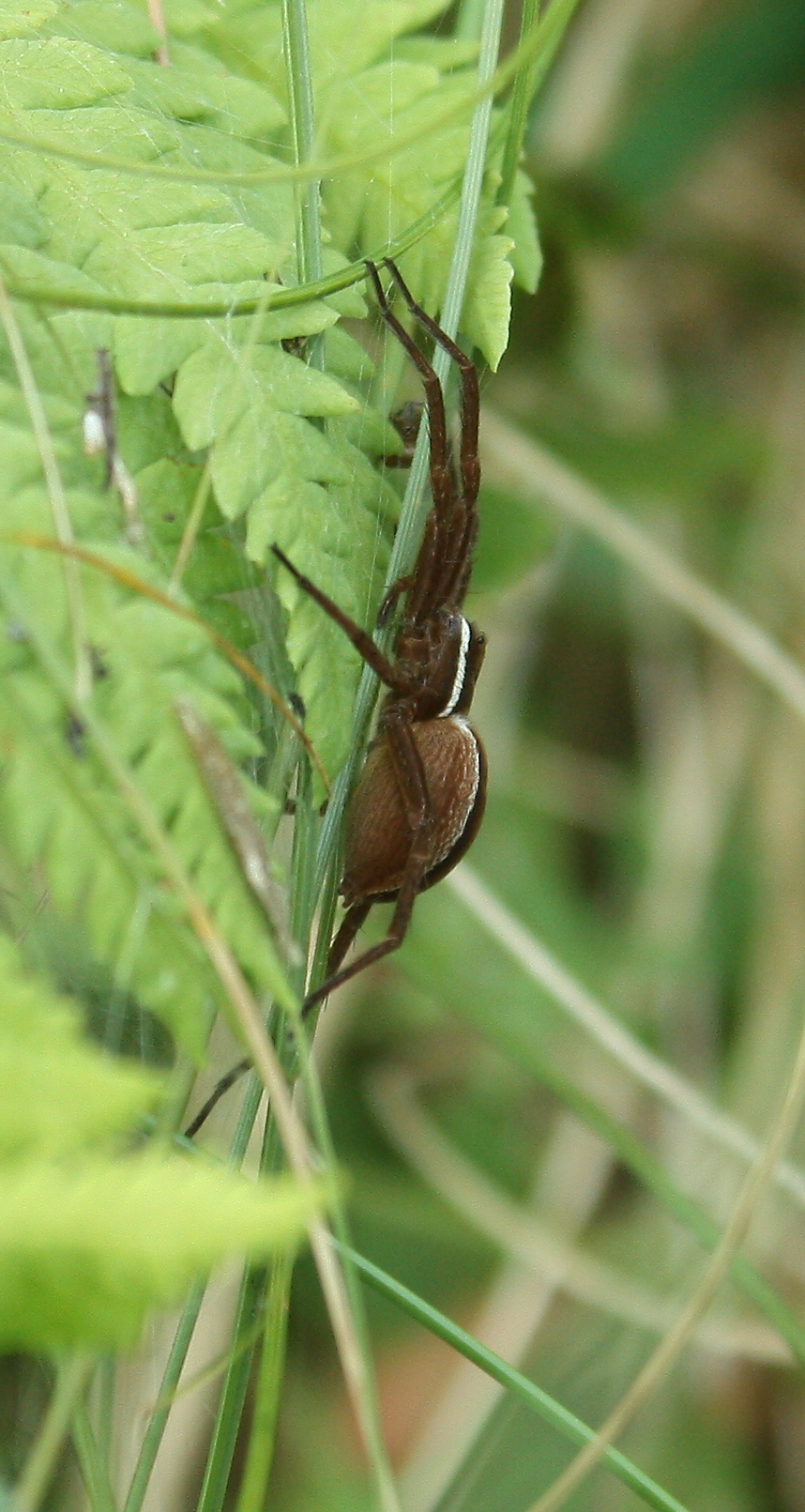
