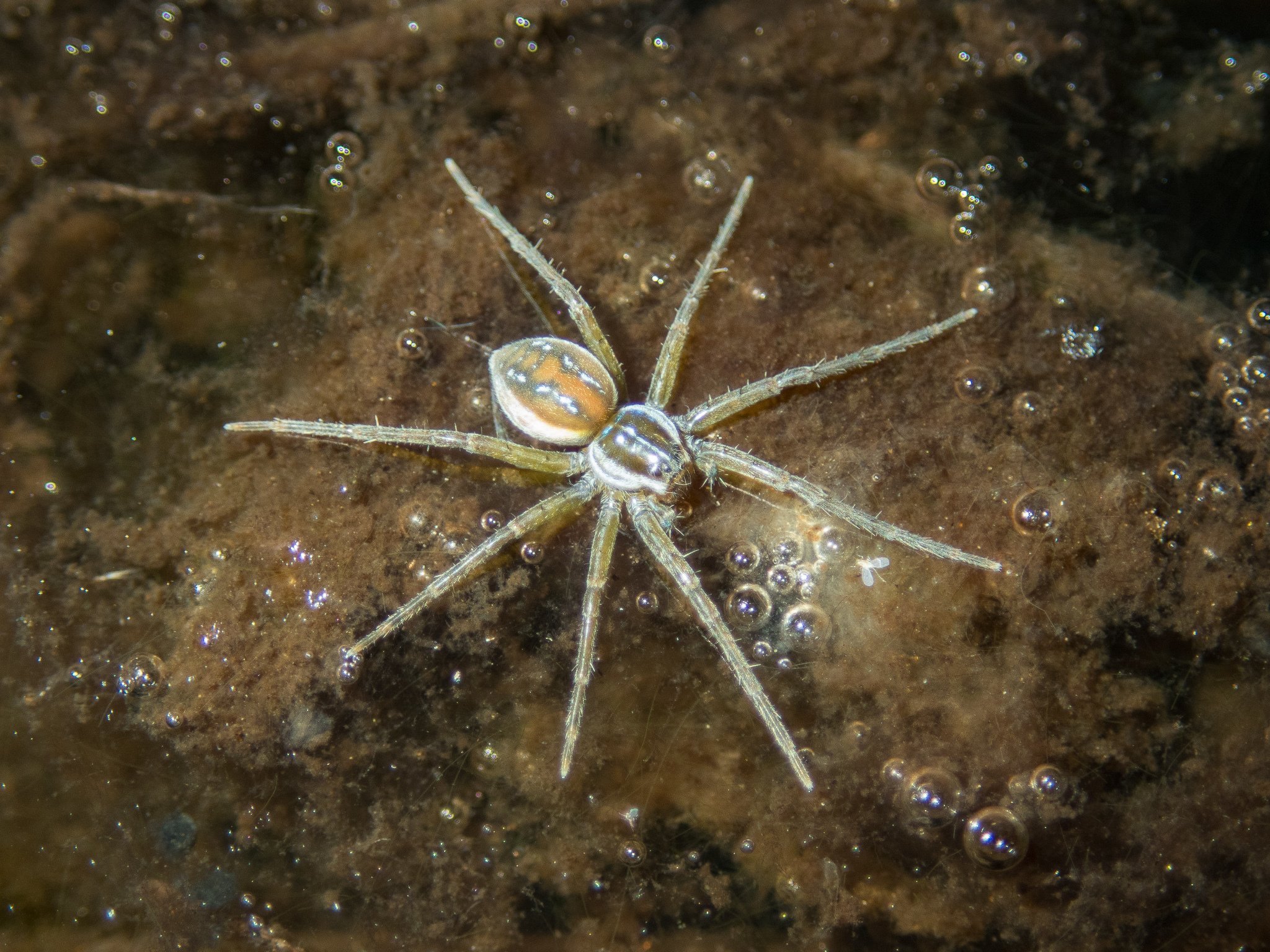

Scientific classification
- Domain: Eukaryota
- Kingdom: Animalia
- Phylum: Arthropoda
- Subphylum: Chelicerata
- Class: Arachnida
- Order: Araneae
- Infraorder: Araneomorphae
- Family: Dolomedidae
- Genus: Dolomedes
- Species: D. facetus

Binomial name
- Dolomedes facetus L.Koch, 1876

Synonyms
- Dolomedes chroesus Chrysanthus, 1967

= Dolomedes facetus =

Species of spider

Dolomedes facetus, commonly known as the clever fishing spider, is a species of medium to large-sized fishing spider endemic to Australia. It lives in freshwater ponds and waterways in coastal areas, ranging from Western Australia to Tasmania. It is common in northern parts of Australia, particularly Queensland and the Northern Territory. It has also been introduced and become naturalised to New Zealand.
