= Dolomedes boiei =

Scientific classification
- Domain: Eukaryota
- Kingdom: Animalia
- Phylum: Arthropoda
- Subphylum: Chelicerata
- Class: Arachnida
- Order: Araneae
- Infraorder: Araneomorphae
- Family: Dolomedidae
- Genus: Dolomedes
- Species: D. boiei

Binomial name
- Dolomedes boiei (Doleschall, 1859)

Synonyms
- Lycosa boiei Doleschall, 1859; Tarentuloides boiei (Doleschall, 1859)

Species of spider

Dolomedes boiei, is a species of spider of the genus Dolomedes. It is native to Java and Sri Lanka.
