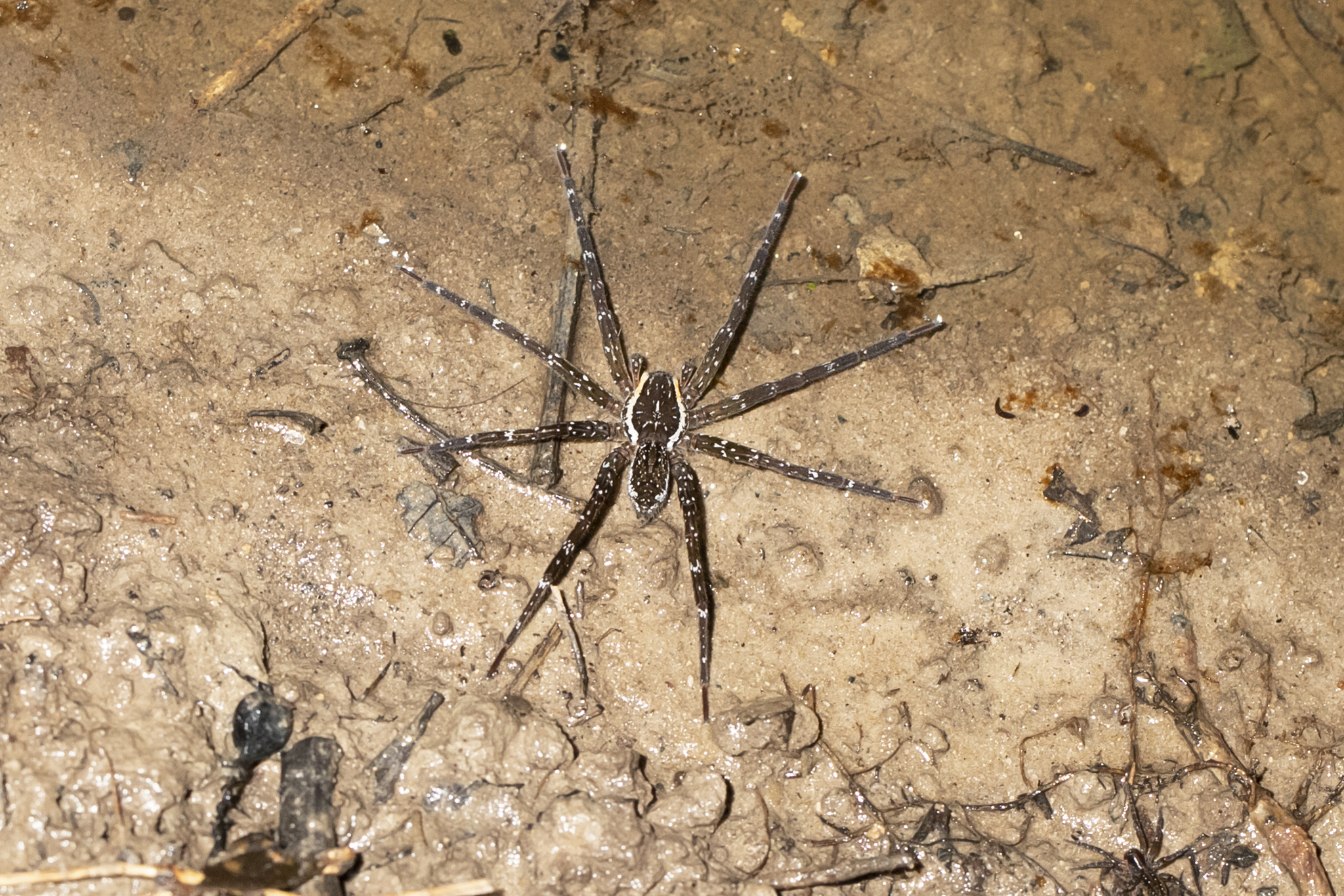
- Dolomedes briangreenei from Julatten, Queensland

Scientific classification
- Kingdom: Animalia
- Phylum: Arthropoda
- Subphylum: Chelicerata
- Class: Arachnida
- Order: Araneae
- Infraorder: Araneomorphae
- Family: Dolomedidae
- Genus: Dolomedes
- Species: D. briangreenei

Binomial name
- Dolomedes briangreenei Raven & Hebron, 2018

= Dolomedes briangreenei =

Species of spider

Dolomedes briangreenei is a species of fishing spiders found in Australia. The species name honours the physicist Brian Greene.
