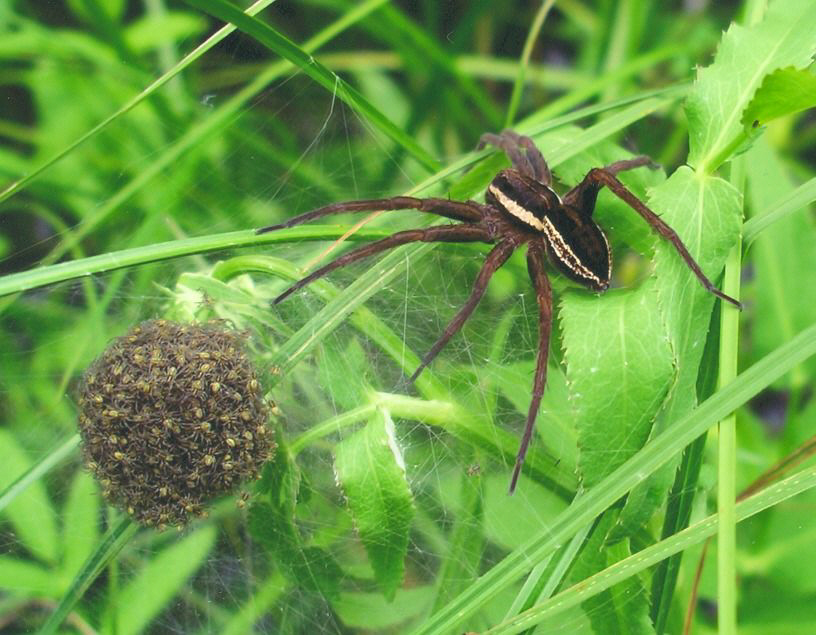
- Raft spider (D. fimbriatus) female with juvenile spiders

Scientific classification
- Kingdom: Animalia
- Phylum: Arthropoda
- Subphylum: Chelicerata
- Class: Arachnida
- Order: Araneae
- Infraorder: Araneomorphae
- Family: Dolomedidae
- Genus: Dolomedes; Latreille, 1804

Species
- See text.

Diversity
- c. 101 species

Synonyms
- Cispiolus Roewer, 1955; Teippus Chamberlin, 1924

= Dolomedes =

Genus of spiders

Dolomedes /dɒləˈmiːdiːz/ is a genus of large spiders of the family Dolomedidae. They are also known as fishing spiders, raft spiders, dock spiders or wharf spiders. Almost all Dolomedes species are semiaquatic, with the exception of the tree-dwelling D. albineus of the southeastern United States. Many species have a striking pale stripe down each side of the body.

They hunt by waiting at the edge of a pool or stream, then when they detect the ripples from prey, they run across the surface to subdue it using their foremost legs, which are tipped with small claws; then injecting venom with their hollow chelicerae to kill and digest the prey. They mainly eat insects, but some larger species are able to catch small fish. They can also climb beneath the water, when they become encased in a silvery film of air. "Dolomedes" is derived from the Greek word δολομήδης which means wily, deceitful.

There are over a hundred species of Dolomedes throughout the world; examples include Dolomedes aquaticus, a forest-stream species of New Zealand, the raft spider (D. fimbriatus), which lives in bogs in Europe, and the great raft spider (D. plantarius), which lives in fens, also in Europe. Many species are large, some with females up to 26 mm (1.0 in) long with a leg span of 80 mm (3.1 in).

== Aquatic adaptations ==
Dolomedes spiders are covered all over in short, velvety hairs which are hydrophobic. This allows them to use surface tension to stand or run on the water, like water striders. They can also climb beneath the water, and then air becomes trapped in the body hairs and forms a thin film over the whole surface of the body and legs, giving them the appearance of fine polished silver. Like other spiders, Dolomedes breathe with book lungs beneath their abdomens, and these open into the air film, allowing the spiders to breathe while submerged. The trapped air makes them very buoyant and if they do not hold onto a rock or a plant stem they float to the surface where they pop onto the surface film, completely dry.

== Identification ==
If any of this species are seen without context, one may confuse them with the family Lycosidae, otherwise known as wolf spiders. They can be differentiated from wolf spiders by their smaller posterior median eyes, and eye arrangement of eight eyes in two rows as opposed to three rows. If this is insufficient, one can further differentiate them thanks to their aquatic adaptations.

== Hunting behavior ==
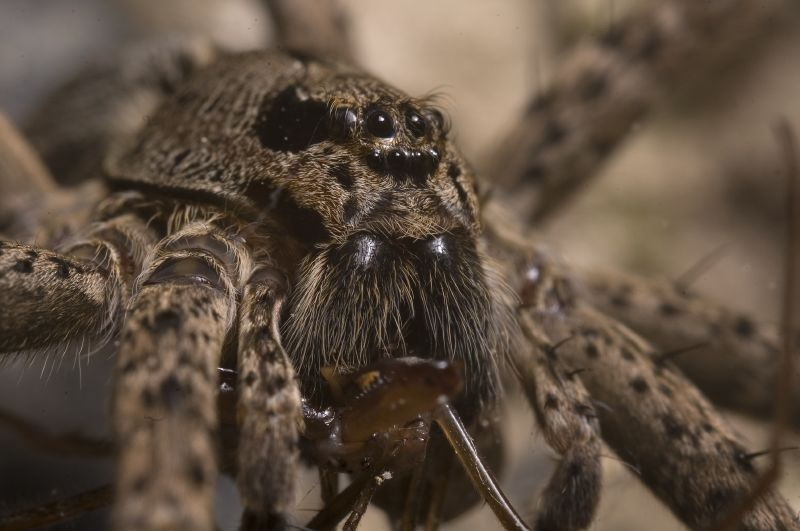
Like other spiders Dolomedes have eight eyes, but their sense of touch is more important when it comes to detecting prey by their vibrations on the surface of the water.

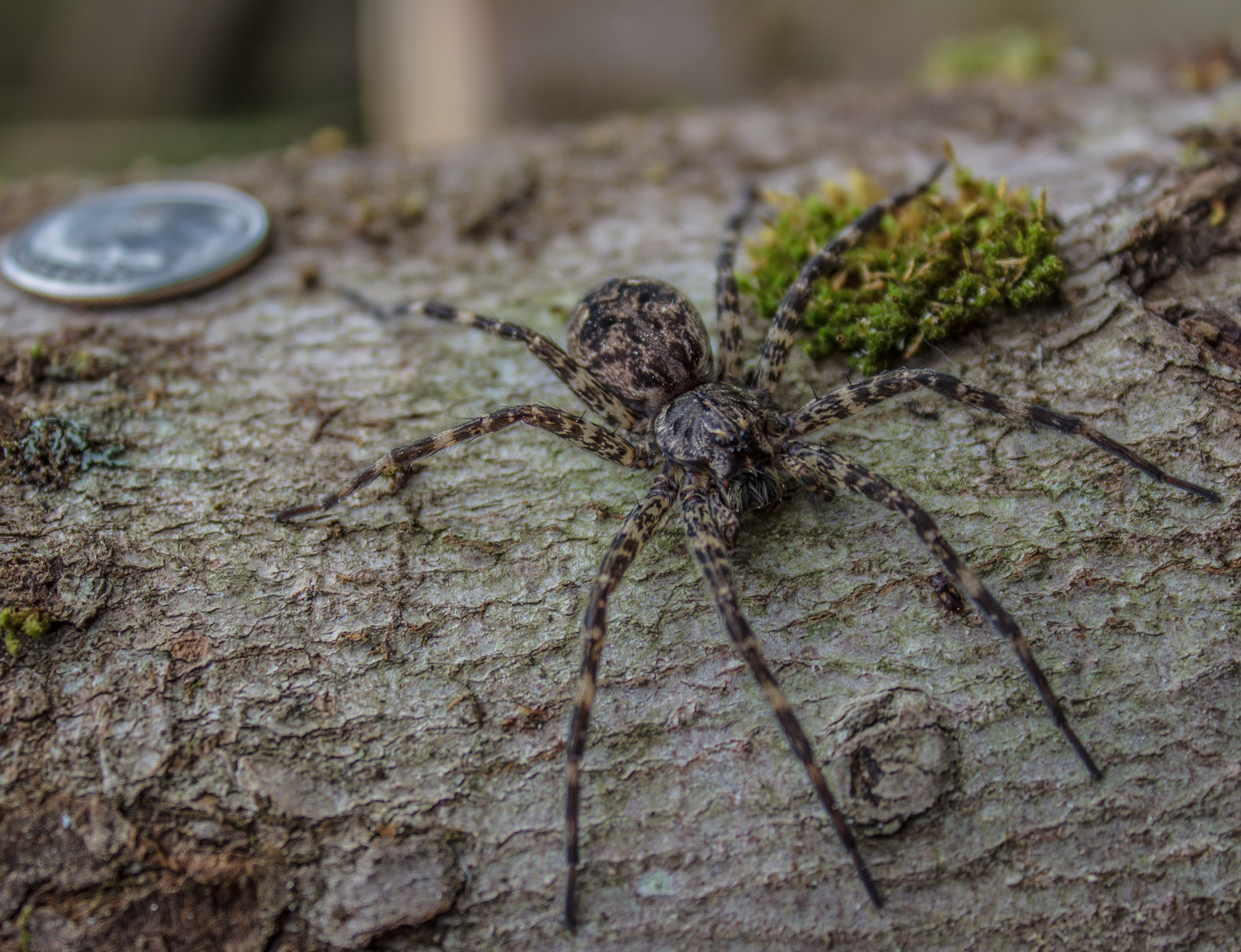
Fishing spider with a dime for size reference

Rather than hunting on land or by waiting in a web, these spiders hunt on the surface of the water itself, preying on mayflies, other aquatic insects, and even small fish. For fishing spiders, the water surface serves the same function as a web does for other spiders. They extend their legs onto the surface, feeling for vibrations given off by prey.

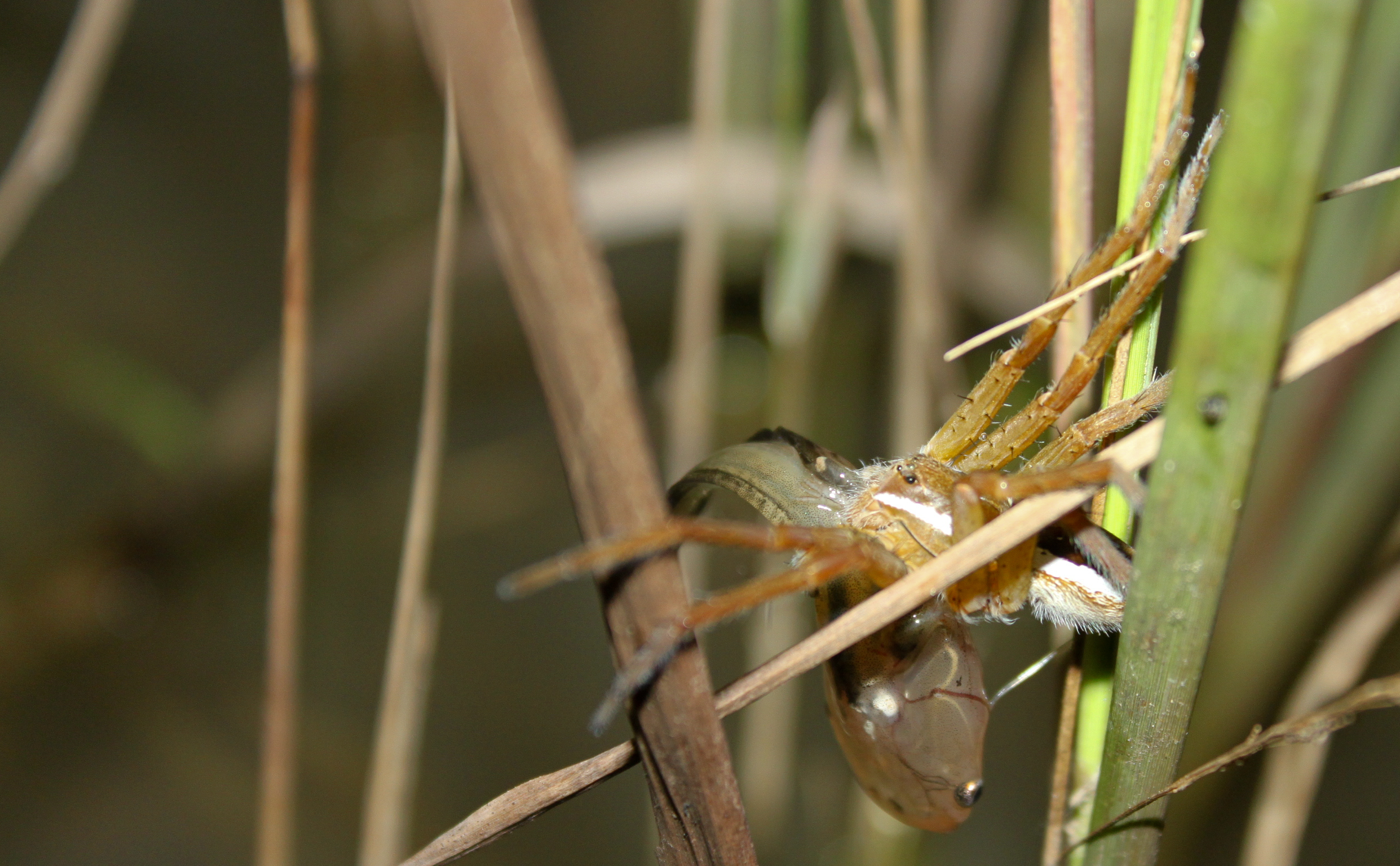
Fishing spider with its prey, a Cameroon clawed frog tadpole

Dolomedes are nocturnal hunters, feeding when birds, their main predators, are sleeping. The method they use to fish for insects is to hold on to the shore with their back legs while the rest of their body lies on the water, with legs stretched out. Dolomedes species tend to be robust with thickset legs that allow them to tackle prey larger than themselves. They stretch out their front legs and wait, as if listening. Their front legs feel the vibrations carried on the water, just as other spiders feel the vibrations in a web. They are able to tell what is causing the vibrations that the water is carrying – to distinguish the drawn-out, erratic vibrations of a struggling insect from the one-off vibrations caused by falling leaves or the background noise of the wind or the flow of the water around rocks and other obstacles. As well as identifying the source of the vibrations, the spiders are also able to discern the distance to and direction of the source. To this end they have a range of vibration-detecting organs, including very sensitive hairs (trichobothria) on their legs and feet. Their eyes play a secondary role; experiments on related species show that touch is the main sense these spiders use to catch their prey. Their eyes are of little use for nocturnal hunting. These vibration detectors also serve to warn the spider of predators such as trout.

As soon as the vibrations reveal that there is a floundering insect within range, some fishing spiders may take direct action – they run at pace across the surface of the water and grab the insect before it extracts itself from the water and flies to safety. Some fishing spiders use silk draglines to prevent themselves from speeding past the prey.

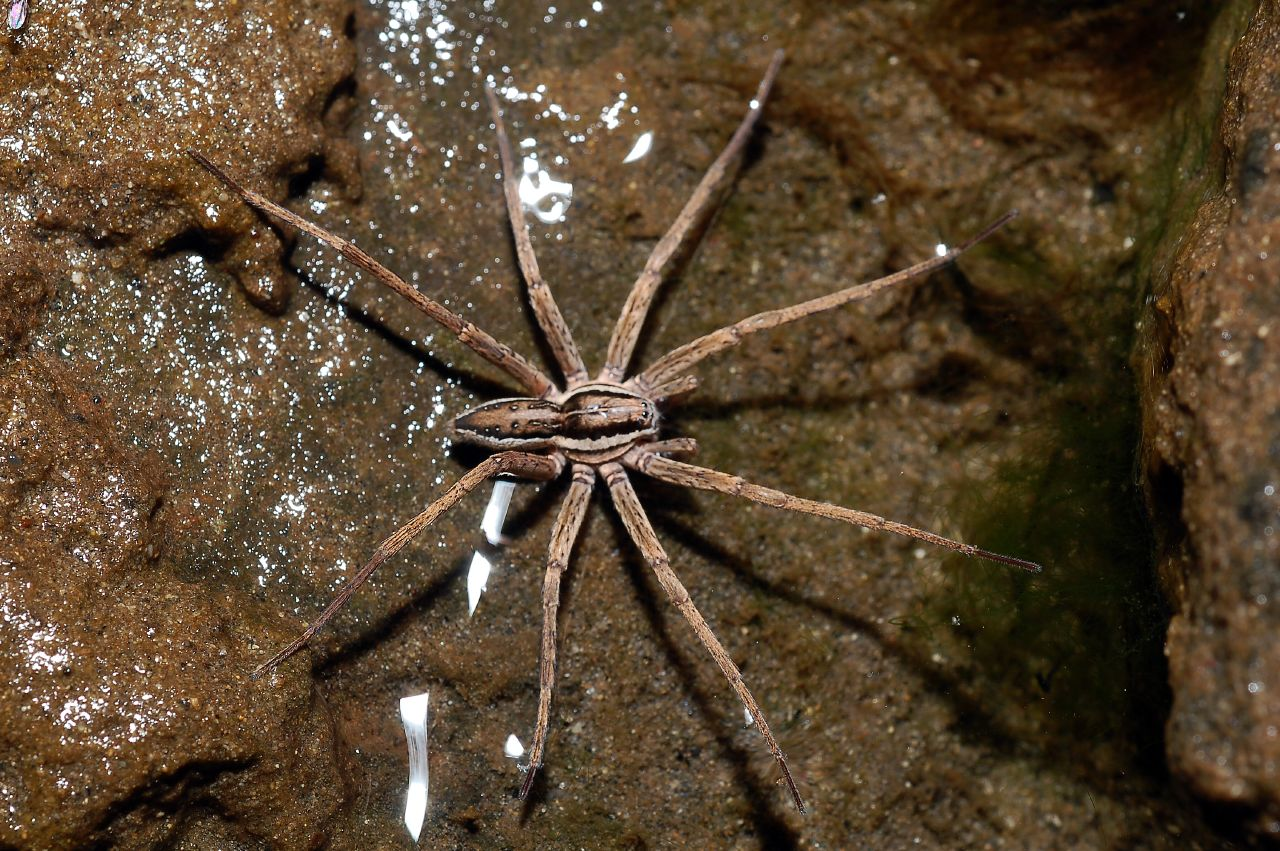
A male shows the typical hunting stance of Dolomedes minor

Fishing spiders' main prey in New Zealand is aquatic insects, but they are opportunistic feeders and will eat anything suitable that happens within range. There are reports in Australia of Dolomedes, including a Dolomedes facetus, eating goldfish and a report in the United States of a Dolomedes consuming an immature smallmouth bass, but more common prey may be Gambusia species, sticklebacks, Elassoma and other small fish depending on locale.

== Predators ==
The main predators of fishing spiders are birds and snakes. Dragonflies have also been observed catching young spiders. Species parasitic on the spiders include a wasp of the Pompilidae family, commonly called the Spider Wasp, that stings the spider to paralyze it before carrying it off and laying an egg in its abdomen. The larvae of the wasp hatch and proceed to eat the spider from the inside out. One escape technique the spiders use is to disappear beneath the surface tension of the water. However, some wasps, such as Anoplius depressipes, are able to be underwater for a few minutes to sting the spider and drag it out of the water.

== Breeding ==
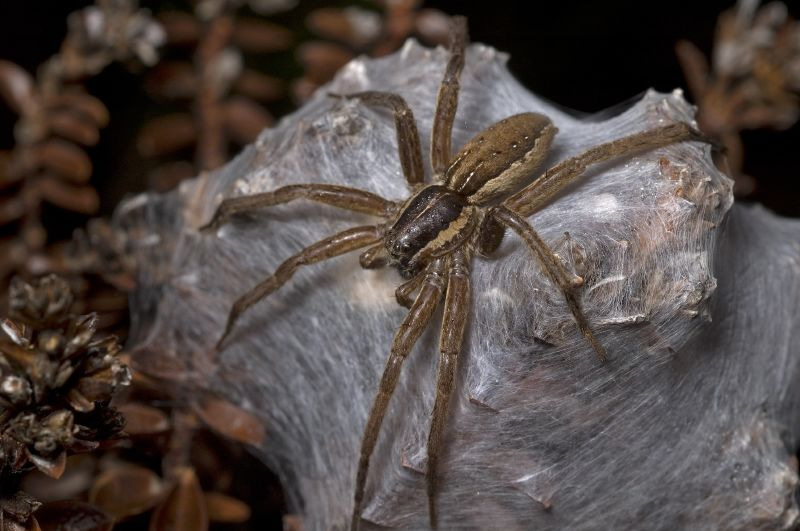
A female Dolomedes minor guards her egg sac

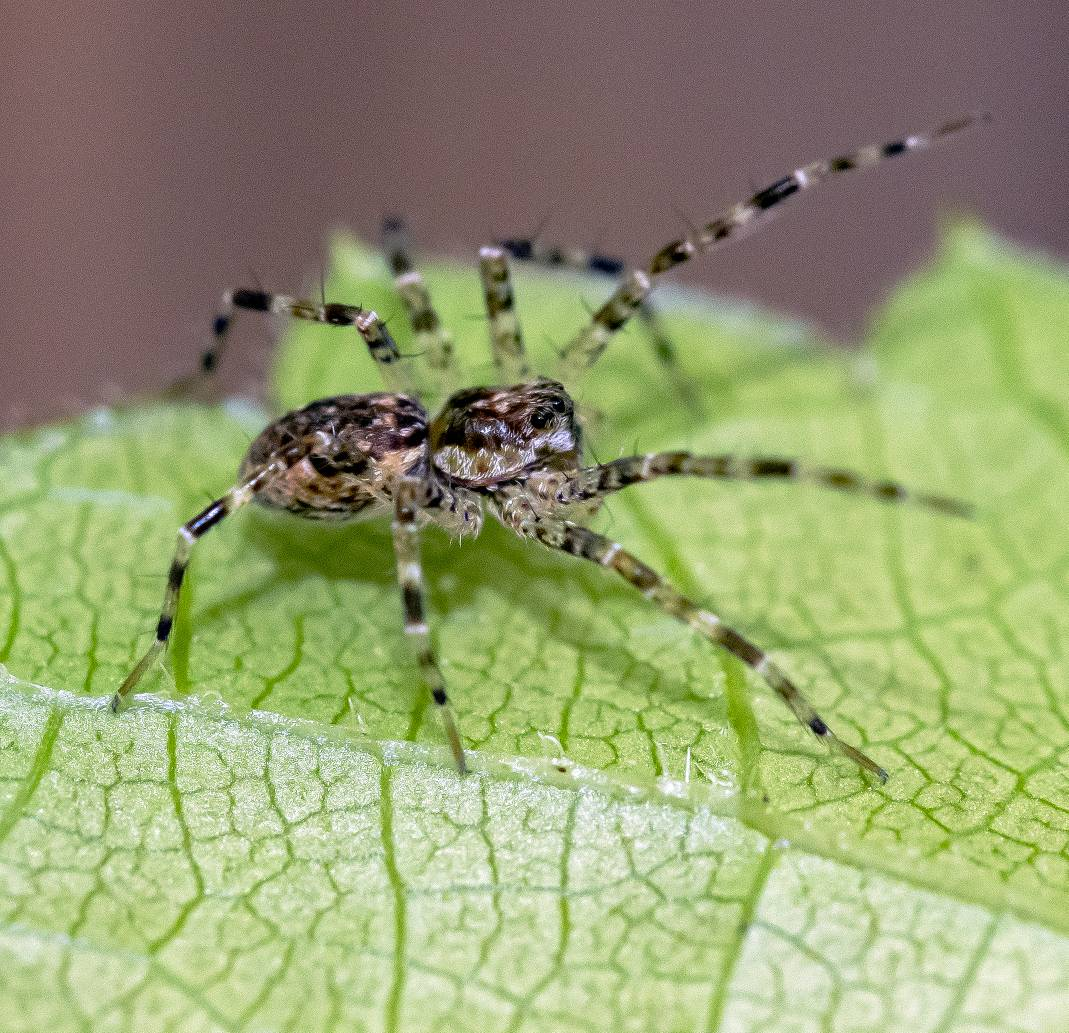
Dolomedes sp. sling

The males outnumber the females 3:1 suggesting a male-biased sex ratio. Mating in one North American species (D. tenebrosus) always results in the obligate death of the male, with no obvious involvement from the female.

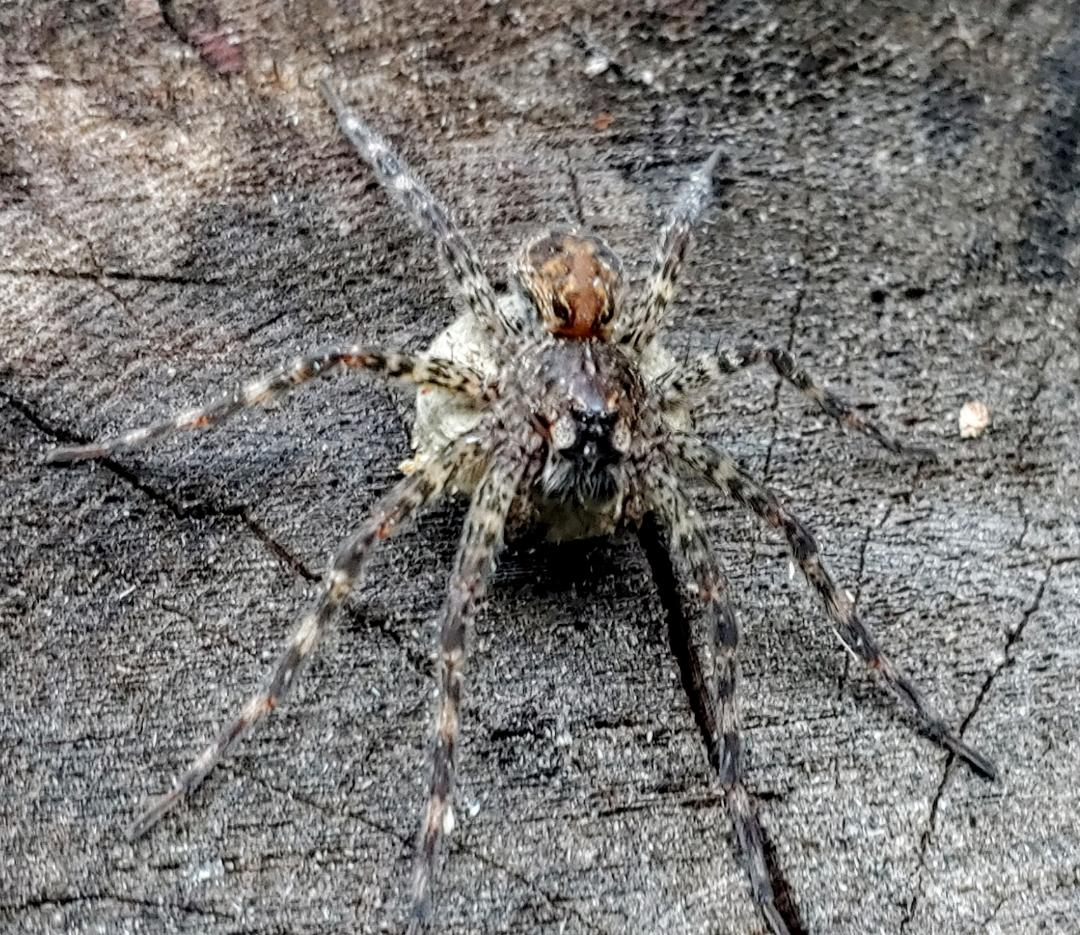
Large female Dolomedes with egg sack.

== Species ==
As of November 2021, the World Spider Catalog accepted the following 101 species:

- Dolomedes actaeon Pocock, 1903 – Cameroon
- Dolomedes albicomus L. Koch, 1867 – Australia (Queensland, New South Wales)
- Dolomedes albicoxus Bertkau, 1880 – Brazil
- Dolomedes albineus Hentz, 1845 – USA
- Dolomedes alexandri Raven & Hebron, 2018 – Australia (Capital Territory, Victoria)
- Dolomedes angolensis (Roewer, 1955) – Angola
- Dolomedes angustivirgatus Kishida, 1936 – China, Korea, Japan
- Dolomedes angustus (Thorell, 1899) – Cameroon
- Dolomedes annulatus Simon, 1877 – Philippines
- Dolomedes aquaticus Goyen, 1888 – New Zealand
- Dolomedes batesi Pocock, 1903 – Cameroon
- Dolomedes bistylus Roewer, 1955 – Congo
- Dolomedes boiei (Doleschall, 1859) – Sri Lanka, Indonesia (Java)
- Dolomedes briangreenei Raven & Hebron, 2018 – Australia (New South Wales, Queensland)
- Dolomedes bukhkaloi Marusik, 1988 – Russia
- Dolomedes chevronus Yin, 2012 – China
- Dolomedes chinesus Chamberlin, 1924 – China
- Dolomedes chroesus Strand, 1911 – Indonesia (Aru Is., New Guinea)
- Dolomedes costatus Zhang, Zhu & Song, 2004 – China
- Dolomedes crosbyi Lessert, 1928 – Congo
- Dolomedes dondalei Vink & Dupérré, 2010 – New Zealand
- Dolomedes elegans Taczanowski, 1874 – French Guiana
- Dolomedes facetus L. Koch, 1876 – Australia, New Guinea, Samoa
- Dolomedes fageli Roewer, 1955 – Congo
- Dolomedes femoralis Hasselt, 1882 – Indonesia (Sumatra)
- Dolomedes fernandensis Simon, 1910 – Equatorial Guinea (Bioko)
- Dolomedes fimbriatus (Clerck, 1757) (type species) – Palearctic
- Dolomedes flaminius L. Koch, 1867 – Australia (Queensland), New Caledonia
- Dolomedes fontus Tanikawa & Miyashita, 2008 – Japan
- Dolomedes furcatus Roewer, 1955 – Mozambique
- Dolomedes fuscipes Roewer, 1955 – Cameroon
- Dolomedes fuscus Franganillo, 1931 – Cuba
- Dolomedes gertschi Carico, 1973 – USA
- Dolomedes gracilipes Lessert, 1928 – Congo
- Dolomedes guamuhaya Alayón, 2003 – Cuba
- Dolomedes holti Carico, 1973 – Mexico
- Dolomedes horishanus Kishida, 1936 – Taiwan, Japan
- Dolomedes instabilis L. Koch, 1876 – Australia, Papua New Guinea
- Dolomedes intermedius Giebel, 1863 – Colombia
- Dolomedes japonicus Bösenberg & Strand, 1906 – China, Korea, Japan
- Dolomedes kalanoro Silva & Griswold, 2013 – Madagascar
- Dolomedes karijini Raven & Hebron, 2018 – Australia (Western Australia)
- Dolomedes karschi Strand, 1913 – Sri Lanka
- Dolomedes lafoensis Berland, 1924 – New Caledonia
- Dolomedes laticeps Pocock, 1898 – Solomon Is.
- Dolomedes lesserti Roewer, 1955 – Mozambique
- Dolomedes lizturnerae Raven & Hebron, 2018 – Australia (Tasmania)
- Dolomedes machadoi Roewer, 1955 – West Africa
- Dolomedes macrops Simon, 1906 – Sudan
- Dolomedes mankorlod Raven & Hebron, 2018 – Australia (Northern Territory)
- Dolomedes mendigoetmopasi Barrion, 1995 – Philippines
- Dolomedes minahassae Merian, 1911 – Indonesia (Sulawesi)
- Dolomedes minor L. Koch, 1876 – New Zealand
- Dolomedes mizhoanus Kishida, 1936 – China, Laos, Malaysia, Taiwan
- Dolomedes naja Berland, 1938 – Vanuatu
- Dolomedes neocaledonicus Berland, 1924 – New Caledonia
- Dolomedes nigrimaculatus Song & Chen, 1991 – China, Korea
- Dolomedes noukhaiva Walckenaer, 1847 – Marquesas Is.
- Dolomedes ohsuditia Kishida, 1936 – Japan
- Dolomedes okefinokensis Bishop, 1924 – USA
- Dolomedes orion Tanikawa, 2003 – Japan
- Dolomedes palmatus Zhang, Zhu & Song, 2005 – China
- Dolomedes palpiger Pocock, 1903 – Cameroon
- Dolomedes paroculus Simon, 1901 – Malaysia
- Dolomedes pedder Raven & Hebron, 2018 – Australia (Tasmania)
- Dolomedes pegasus Tanikawa, 2012 – Japan
- Dolomedes petalinus Yin, 2012 – China
- Dolomedes plantarius (Clerck, 1757) – Europe, Russia (Europe to South Siberia), Kazakhstan
- Dolomedes pullatus Nicolet, 1849 – Chile
- Dolomedes raptor Bösenberg & Strand, 1906 – Russia, China, Korea, Japan
- Dolomedes raptoroides Zhang, Zhu & Song, 2004 – China
- Dolomedes saganus Bösenberg & Strand, 1906 – China, Taiwan, Japan
- Dolomedes schauinslandi Simon, 1899 – New Zealand
- Dolomedes scriptus Hentz, 1845 – USA, Canada
- Dolomedes senilis Simon, 1880 – Russia, China, Japan
- Dolomedes signatus Walckenaer, 1837 – Mariana Is.
- Dolomedes silvicola Tanikawa & Miyashita, 2008 – China, Japan
- Dolomedes smithi Lessert, 1916 – East Africa
- Dolomedes spathularis Hasselt, 1882 – Indonesia (Sumatra)
- Dolomedes stilatus Karsch, 1878 – Australia
- Dolomedes straeleni Roewer, 1955 – Congo
- Dolomedes striatus Giebel, 1869 – USA, Canada
- Dolomedes sulfureus L. Koch, 1878 – Russia, China, Korea, Japan
- Dolomedes sumatranus Strand, 1906 – Indonesia (Sumatra)
- Dolomedes tadzhikistanicus Andreeva, 1976 – Tajikistan
- Dolomedes tenebrosus Hentz, 1844 – USA, Canada
- Dolomedes titan Berland, 1924 – New Caledonia, Vanuatu
- Dolomedes toldo Alayón, 2003 – Cuba
- Dolomedes transfuga Pocock, 1900 – Congo
- Dolomedes triton (Walckenaer, 1837) – North America, Cuba
- Dolomedes upembensis (Roewer, 1955) – Congo
- Dolomedes vatovae Caporiacco, 1940 – Ethiopia
- Dolomedes venmani Raven & Hebron, 2018 – Australia (New South Wales, Queensland)
- Dolomedes vicque Raven & Hebron, 2018 – Australia (Victoria, New South Wales, Queensland)
- Dolomedes vittatus Walckenaer, 1837 – USA
- Dolomedes wetarius Strand, 1911 – Indonesia
- Dolomedes wollastoni Hogg, 1915 – New Guinea
- Dolomedes wollemi Raven & Hebron, 2018 – Australia (New South Wales)
- Dolomedes yawatai Ono, 2002 – Japan (Ryukyu Is.)
- Dolomedes zatsun Tanikawa, 2003 – Japan
- Dolomedes zhangjiajiensis Yin, 2012 – China

== Distribution ==
The approximately 100 species of Dolomedes have a worldwide distribution. The largest number of species are found in Asia, with particularly high species diversity in South-east Asia, from China and Japan to New Guinea. The second largest number of species occur in tropical Africa. South America has only four species.

=== North America ===
Nine species of Dolomedes exist in North America. The six-spotted fishing spider (D. triton) lives primarily in small lakes and ponds. This spider consumes mostly water striders (pond skaters), but like all Dolomedes, it is an opportunistic ambush hunter that will eat anything that it can capture. Other species include the bog-dwelling D. striatus, and four species living by streams: D. scriptus, D. vittatus, D. gertschi and D. holti. Two North American species, D. tenebrosus and D. okefinokensis, exhibit female giganticism and/or male dwarfism, with their males being less than half the size of the females. The ninth species is the arboreal D. albineus.

=== Europe ===
Two Dolomedes species occur in Europe (excluding Russia). The Palearctic raft spider (D. fimbriatus) is widespread on the surface of bog pools and in boggy grassland. The great raft spider (D. plantarius) lives in fens, and is listed as endangered in Great Britain and is globally vulnerable.

=== New Zealand ===
The Rangatira spider (Dolomedes schauinslandi) is most commonly seen on dead trees.

Four endemic species of Dolomedes occur in New Zealand, three on the mainland and one on the Chatham Islands. Two are widespread: D. aquaticus of open riverbanks and lakeshores, and D. dondalei or New Zealand forest fishing spider (once referred to as Dolomedes III), which specialises in forested riverbanks. The largest New Zealand species, D. schauinslandi or the Rangatira spider, occurs on rodent-free islands in the Chathams where running water is rare. The fourth and most common species, D. minor, is found in scrubland, grassland, and wetlands. It mostly hunts on the ground, but is still capable of catching aquatic prey. Known as the nursery web spider, it makes white nursery webs on shrubs.
