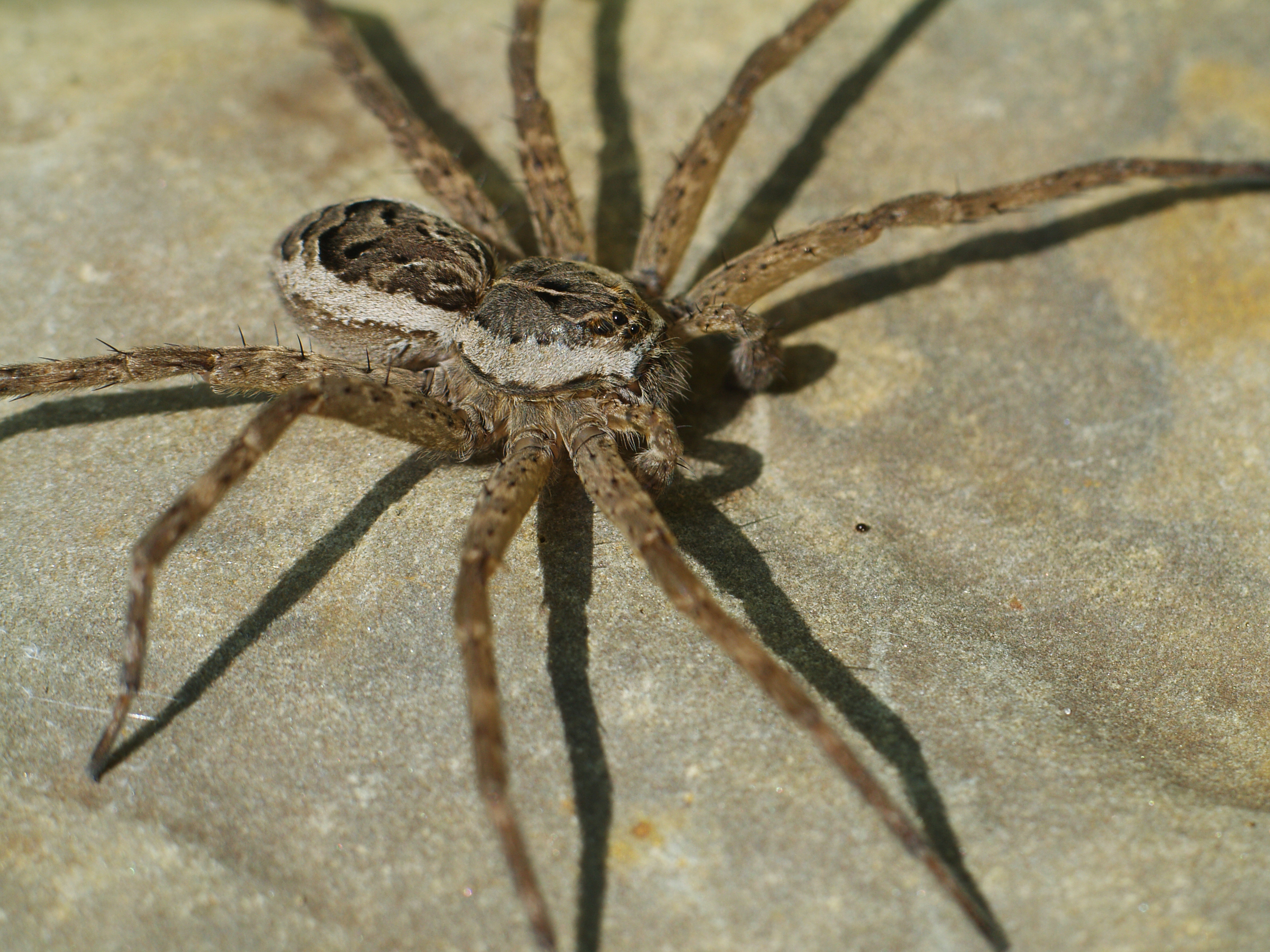

Conservation status
- Secure (NatureServe)

Scientific classification
- Kingdom: Animalia
- Phylum: Arthropoda
- Subphylum: Chelicerata
- Class: Arachnida
- Order: Araneae
- Infraorder: Araneomorphae
- Family: Dolomedidae
- Genus: Dolomedes
- Species: D. scriptus

Binomial name
- Dolomedes scriptus (Hentz, 1845)

Synonyms
- D. fontanus Emerton, 1885

= Dolomedes scriptus =

Striped fishing spider

Species of spider

Dolomedes scriptus is a fishing spider found in the United States and Canada, known as the striped fishing spider. Female spiders can grow to be over 6 cm in legspan. The spider is a pale brown colour with lighter stripes around its legs and a stripe down each side of the body. It is similar to D. tenebrosus.
