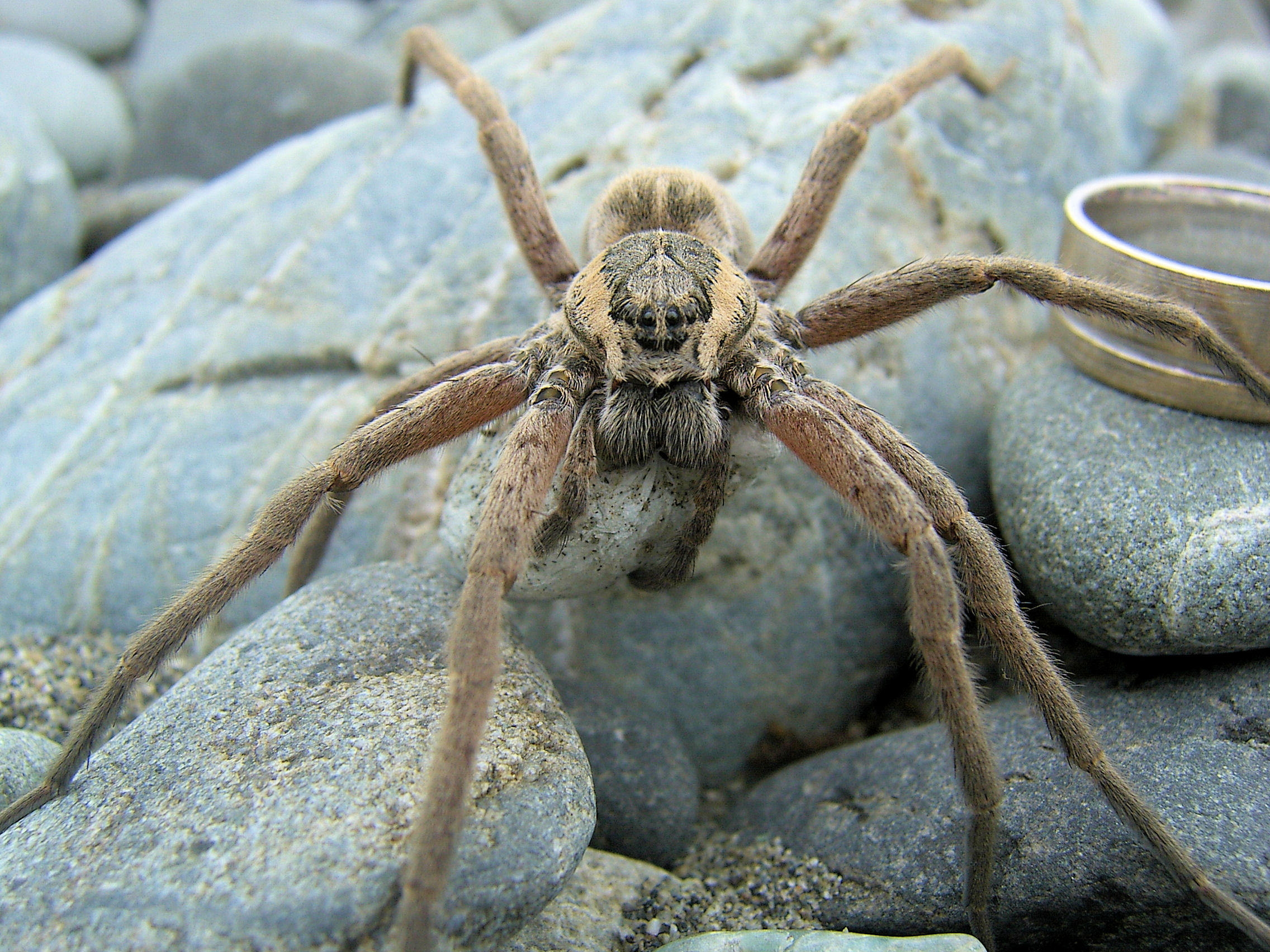
- Female with egg sac

Conservation status
- Not Threatened (NZ TCS)

Scientific classification
- Kingdom: Animalia
- Phylum: Arthropoda
- Subphylum: Chelicerata
- Class: Arachnida
- Order: Araneae
- Infraorder: Araneomorphae
- Family: Dolomedidae
- Genus: Dolomedes
- Species: D. aquaticus

Binomial name
- Dolomedes aquaticus Goyen, 1887

= Dolomedes aquaticus =

Species of spider

Dolomedes aquaticus is a species of fishing spider that lives and hunts along the gravel banks of unforested New Zealand rivers. It prefer open riverbanks where it typically lives under rocks, usually less than 5 metres away from the river. Its colouring allows it to camouflage against river stones. Normally nocturnal, it will sit and wait for prey after dark, and can survive for short periods under the water.

== Taxonomy ==
Dolomedes aquaticus was described in 1887 by Peter Goyen.

== Description ==
Females have a total body length of 13–26 mm, whilst males are typically smaller at 11–18 mm. The fourth leg is the longest, about 36 mm in females and 33 mm in males. The cephalothorax is chocolate brown, with a supra-marginal band of yellow extending from the posterior slope to the anterior angle of the pars cephalica: falces, maxillæ, labium, and sternum chocolate-brown; legs and palpi, brown; abdomen above greenish-brown with two longitudinal rows of brown-margined yellow spots, at the sides greyish, and below dusky-brown with four more or less continuous longitudinal whitish stripes converging towards the anus. At the base of the dorsal surface there is a short median spathulate band of paler hue than the rest of that surface, and on each side of this band a short grey fleck. The cephalothorax and abdomen are densely covered with grey, yellow, and brown pubescence.

== Habitat and distribution ==
Dolomedes aquaticus usually live on open, stony riverbeds and rocky lake shorelines. D. aquaticus has been observed to be at its highest abundance when there is intermediate disturbance along the river banks. D. aquaticus can be found throughout the South Island of New Zealand and in the lower half of the North Island of New Zealand.It has been suggested that D. aquaticus is not present in the upper half of the North Island due to the lack of braided rivers in this region.

== Conservation status ==
This species is listed as "Not Threatened" in the New Zealand Threat Classification System (NZTCS).

== Behaviour ==
Dolomedes aquaticus is found on plants, stones or pieces of wood near the surface of the water. It can swim and run very rapidly on the water's surface. When provoked, it will flee towards the nearest object and may sometimes dive under the water, where it will remain until all danger is gone. Whilst incubating, the female migrates away from the water and lives under a large stone or piece of wood. She will remain here until the young have hatched. During incubation, the female will show considerable aversion to water. The cocoon is globular and is carried under the sternum, to which it is firmly held by the palpi and strands of web from the spinners.
