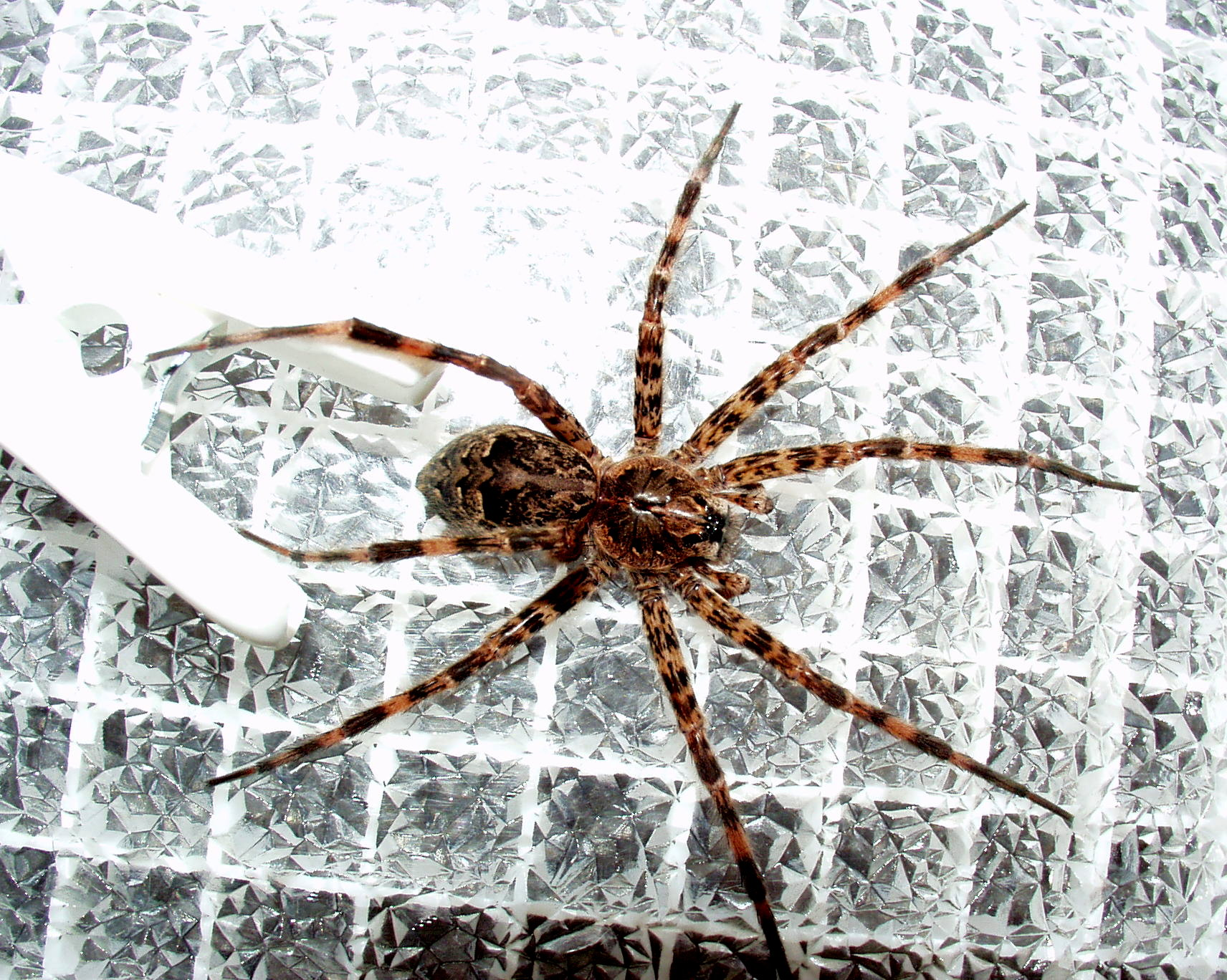

Conservation status
- Secure (NatureServe)

Scientific classification
- Kingdom: Animalia
- Phylum: Arthropoda
- Subphylum: Chelicerata
- Class: Arachnida
- Order: Araneae
- Infraorder: Araneomorphae
- Family: Dolomedidae
- Genus: Dolomedes
- Species: D. tenebrosus

Binomial name
- Dolomedes tenebrosus (Hentz, 1844)

Synonyms
- D. idoneus Montgomery, 1902; D. vernalis Emerton, 1909

= Dolomedes tenebrosus =

Dark fishing spider

Species of spider

Dolomedes tenebrosus, known as the dark fishing spider, is a species of fishing spider found in the United States and Canada. Despite belonging to Dolomedes, it is better described as a "tree-dwelling spider".

== Description ==
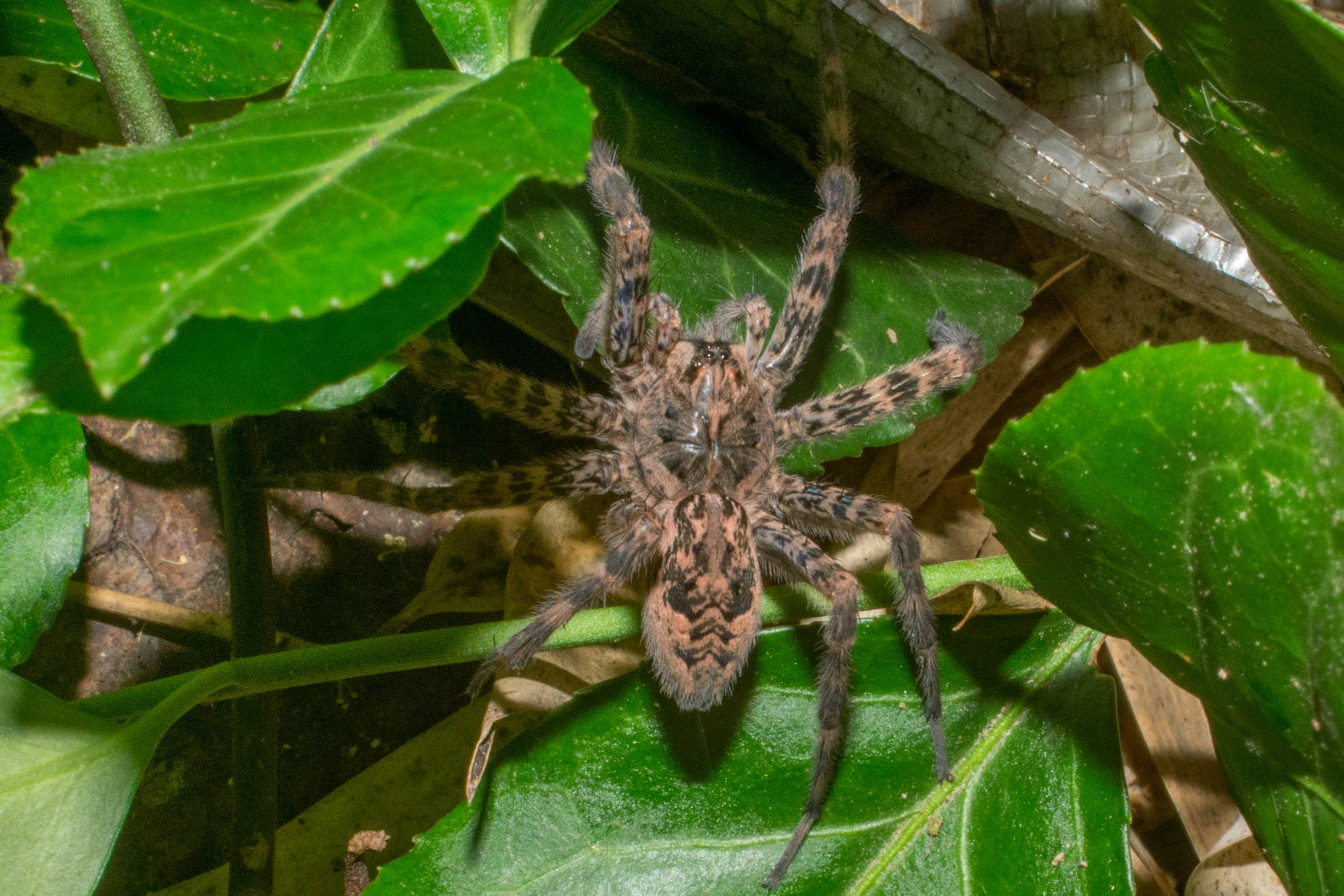
Female found under a log pile in Ohio, USA

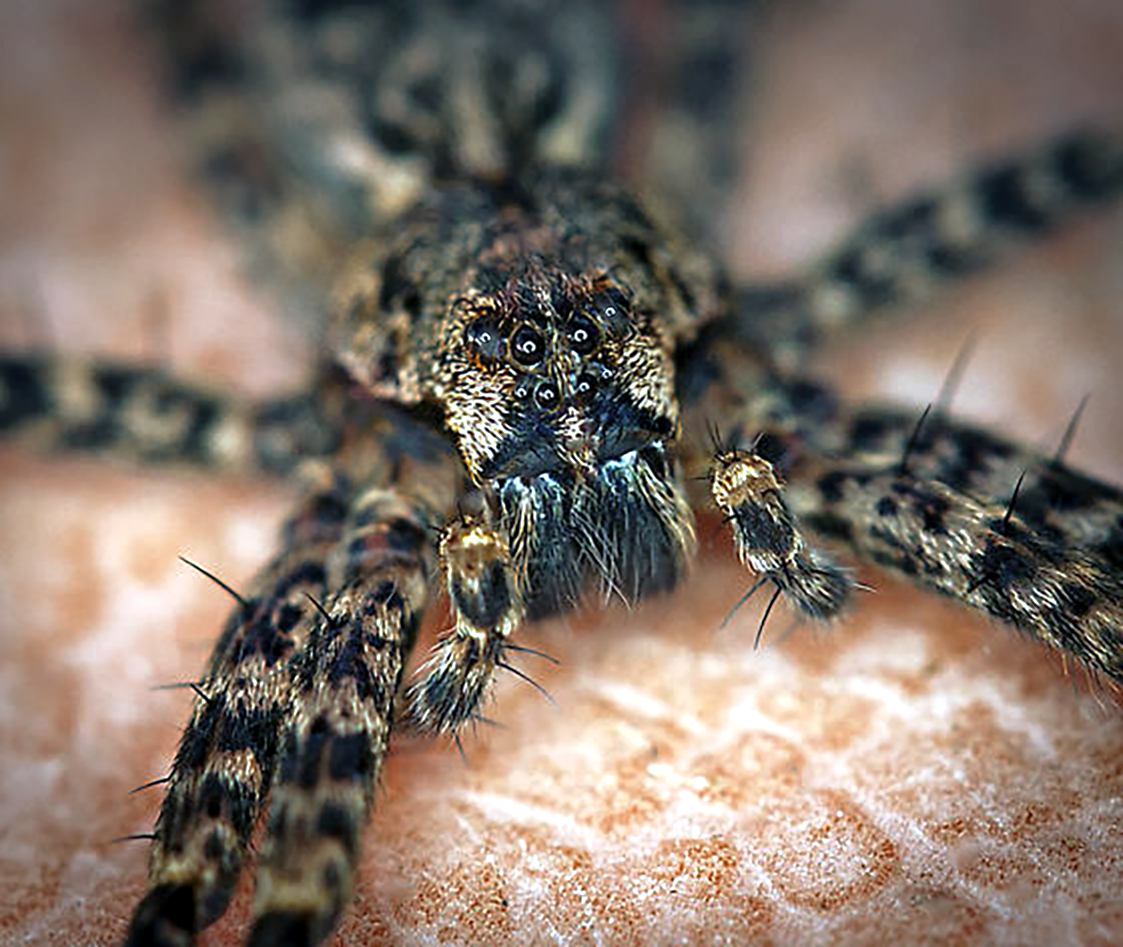
Eye arrangement

Females are 15–26 millimetres (0.59–1.02 in) (excluding legs); and males are 7–13 millimetres (0.28–0.51 in). Leg lengths range from 50–90 millimetres (2.0–3.5 in). The spider is a pale to dark brown colour with several chevron markers and lighter stripes around its legs, similar to D. scriptus. The legs are banded with brown/black annulations on the femora and reddish-brown/black annulations on the tibia. During copulation, females of the species practice sexual cannibalism on their male counterparts. Research shows that the males' self-sacrifice through consumption by the female increases the chance of survivorship of future offspring.

== Habitat ==
They are found in wooded areas and dwell on trees. It will commonly enter homes in wooded locations.

== Bite ==
It is capable of biting humans, but typically flees "at the slightest movement". In most cases, the bite is no more severe than a bee or wasp sting. Those sensitive to spider venom may be at risk.
