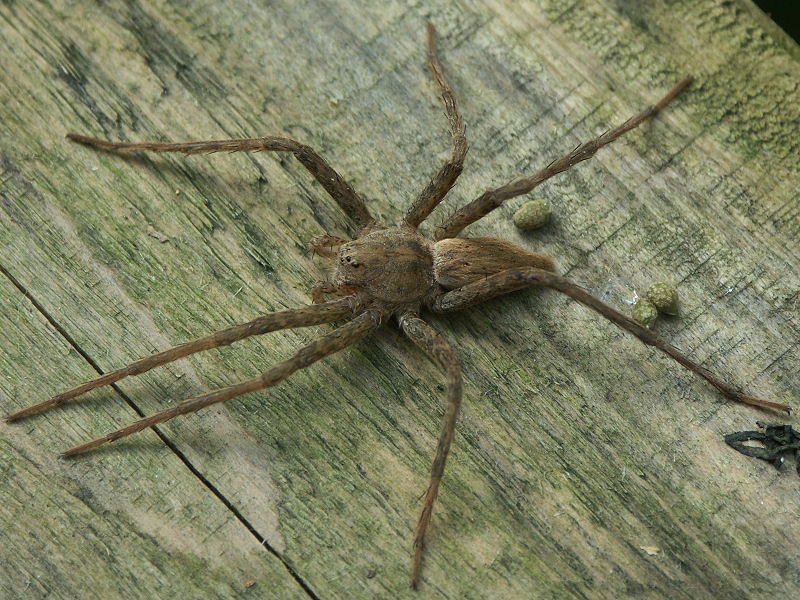

Scientific classification
- Domain: Eukaryota
- Kingdom: Animalia
- Phylum: Arthropoda
- Subphylum: Chelicerata
- Class: Arachnida
- Order: Araneae
- Infraorder: Araneomorphae
- Family: Dolomedidae
- Genus: Dolomedes
- Species: D. sulfureus

Binomial name
- Dolomedes sulfureus L. Koch, 1878

= Dolomedes sulfureus =

Species of spider

Dolomedes sulfureus is a species of spiders commonly known as fishing spiders belonging to the genus Dolomedes. They produce a venom that contains a group of neurotoxic peptides. The species is found in Russia, China, Korea, and Japan.
