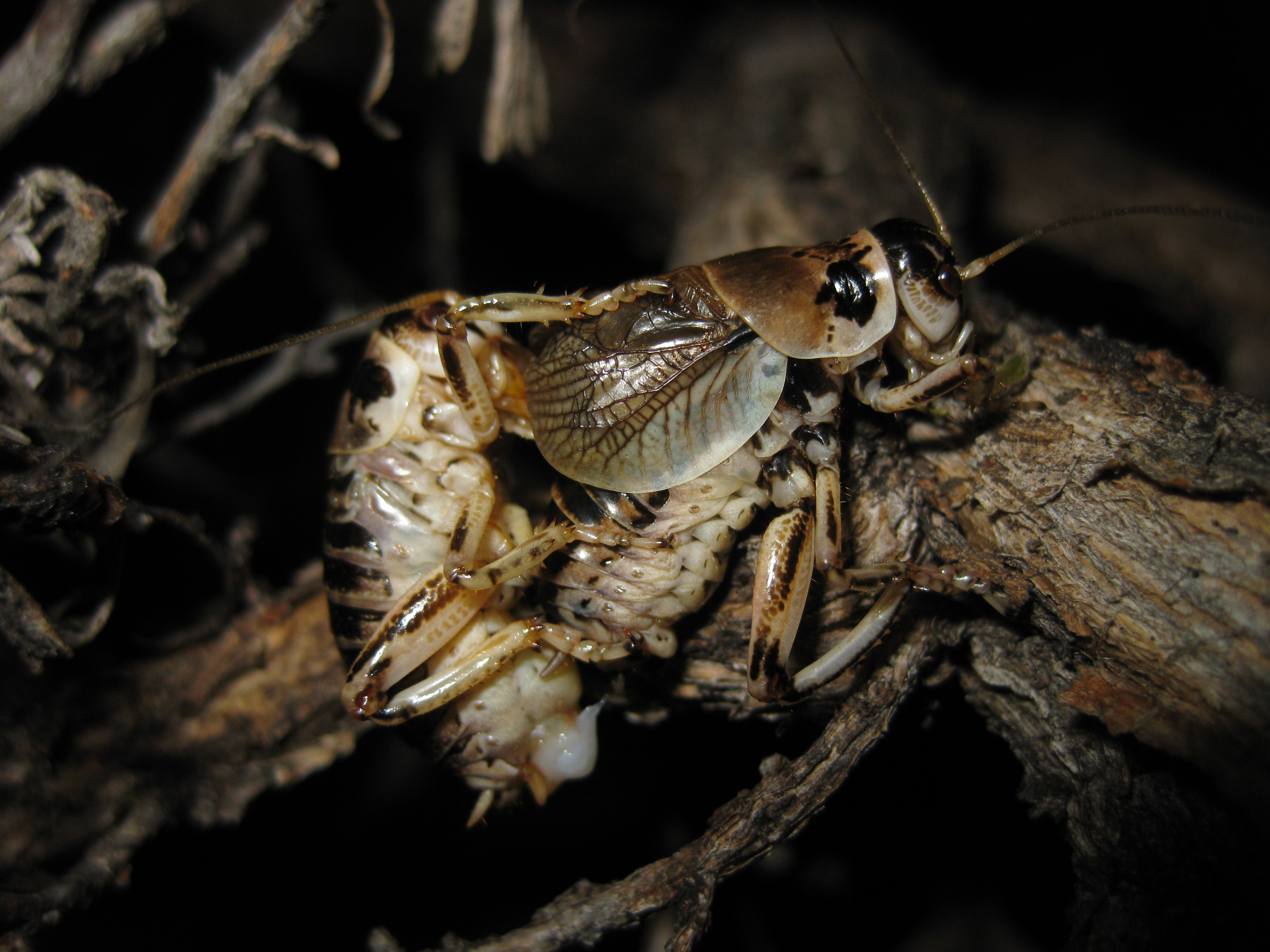
- Mating pair of sagebrush crickets (female left, male right)

Scientific classification
- Kingdom: Animalia
- Phylum: Arthropoda
- Class: Insecta
- Order: Orthoptera
- Suborder: Ensifera
- Family: Prophalangopsidae
- Genus: Cyphoderris
- Species: C. strepitans

Binomial name
- Cyphoderris strepitans Morris and Gwynne, 1978

= Cyphoderris strepitans =

Species of cricket

Cyphoderris strepitans, the sagebrush cricket or sagebrush grig, is a one of only a few surviving species in the family Prophalangopsidae. Three of these species are in the genus Cyphoderris and all three are endemic to North America. C. strepitans name is from the Latin word 'strepitans' which means 'making a great noise', refers to their calling song during the mating season.

== Description ==
Sagebrush crickets are robust, cold adapted grigs that are dark brown in colour with black markings and a cream coloured abdomen, known as a venter. They can grow between 17 and 26 mm and display sexual dimorphism with males having a pair of wings, while the females lack wings. The membranous fore wing covers the fleshy hind wings. Both male and female sagebrush crickets are flightless. They have a large pronotum that covers the base of the fore wings.

Though they are similar in morphology than C. buckelli, another grig species, they can be distinguished from the other based on the male terminalia and are distinguished from C. monstrosa by having a cream white venter instead of a vivid pink venter. The sternal process of C. strepitans is rounded instead of angular in that of C. monstrosa.

== Ecology ==
=== Distribution and habitat ===
Sagebrush crickets occur in the high-elevation sagebrush steppe and subalpine forests of Wyoming and Colorado and overlaps with C. monstrosa in areas of southern Montana. Sagebrush crickets are considered to be allopatric from the other two species.

=== Life cycle ===
Sagebrush crickets go through incomplete metamorphosis, but not much is known about their life cycle. It is assumed that they have a two year life cycle and in the first year they will burrow underground and overwinter as late-Instar or as young adults

=== Diet ===
Their diet consists of staminate flowers, pollen, fruit, and small insects.

== Reproduction ==
=== Mating ===
Mating season starts in mid-May till the end of June. Like most Ensifera species, the male sagebrush cricket attracts females by singing. Singing greatly influence the success of finding a mate and a males mating success is reduced when they are not able to sing Mating occurs at night and males start singing around dusk until late at night. Once the female has chosen a mate the female mounts the male and mating begins. During mating, males hold onto the female using a structure known as a gin trap, an abdominal pinching organ, which can be used to force copulation with females. During copulation, sexual cannibalism occurs in which the female consume the fleshy hind wings of the male as well as the hemolymph that flow from the damaged wing. The wings have evolved over time for this specific purpose It is believed that this sexual cannibalism has evolved in order to keep the female occupied in order for insemination to occur. Forced copulation occurs when there are little hind wing left for a female to feed on and forcing her to stay mounted till insemination occurs While the female is occupied with consuming the hind wings, the male would produce and transfer the spermatophore which has an external spermatophylax, a gelatinous ball containing nutrients, attached to it. After mating the female will consume the spermatophylax, and if the sperm has not entered the females reproductive tract, she will also consume the spermatophore. The consumption of hind wings and spermatophylax are known as nuptial gifts that is thought to provide the female with nutrients to help with egg production by increasing the number of eggs produced and the size of the eggs.

=== Cost of mating ===
Males will lose about ten percent of their total body weight during copulation, this is due to amount of hemolymph and wing loss from females feeding on it. Mating in sagebrush crickets is energetically costly for males and investment trade-offs occur between the reproduction and immunological aspects in organisms that are affected by sexual cannibalism. Singing requires a lot of energy and singing can occur for hours each night. The damage to the hind wings and the loss of hemolymph during mating induce an immune response and the energy required to repair and prevent infection is directed to repair instead of reproduction. This trade-off in energy negatively impacts the reproductive success rate of the male as they spend less time singing than undamaged males and therefore has less chance of finding another mate.

== Acoustic signalling ==
Sagebrush crickets produce a "trill" sound by tegminal stridulation. Sound is used both to attract females and to defend territory. Both fore wings bear a file and scraper which are mirror-images of each other. The overlap of the fore wings are able to change throughout their lifetime which is different from Gryllidae where the right wing is above the left. During stridulation, the files from both wings are used. The peak frequency of the sagebrush cricket is at 12.7 kHz and has a sound level between 100.5 and 101.0 dB. Unlike other Orthoptera, sagebrush crickets can sing at low temperatures and have been found to sing at temperatures of -8 degrees Celsius whereas others minimum temperatures are 7 degrees Celsius.
