= Hearsey =

Hearsey is an English surname. Notable people with the surname include:

- Henry Hearsey (1906–1976), British Anglican priest
- Sir John Bennet Hearsey (1793–1865), British Indian Army commander
- Richard Hearsey (born 1953), British television producer
