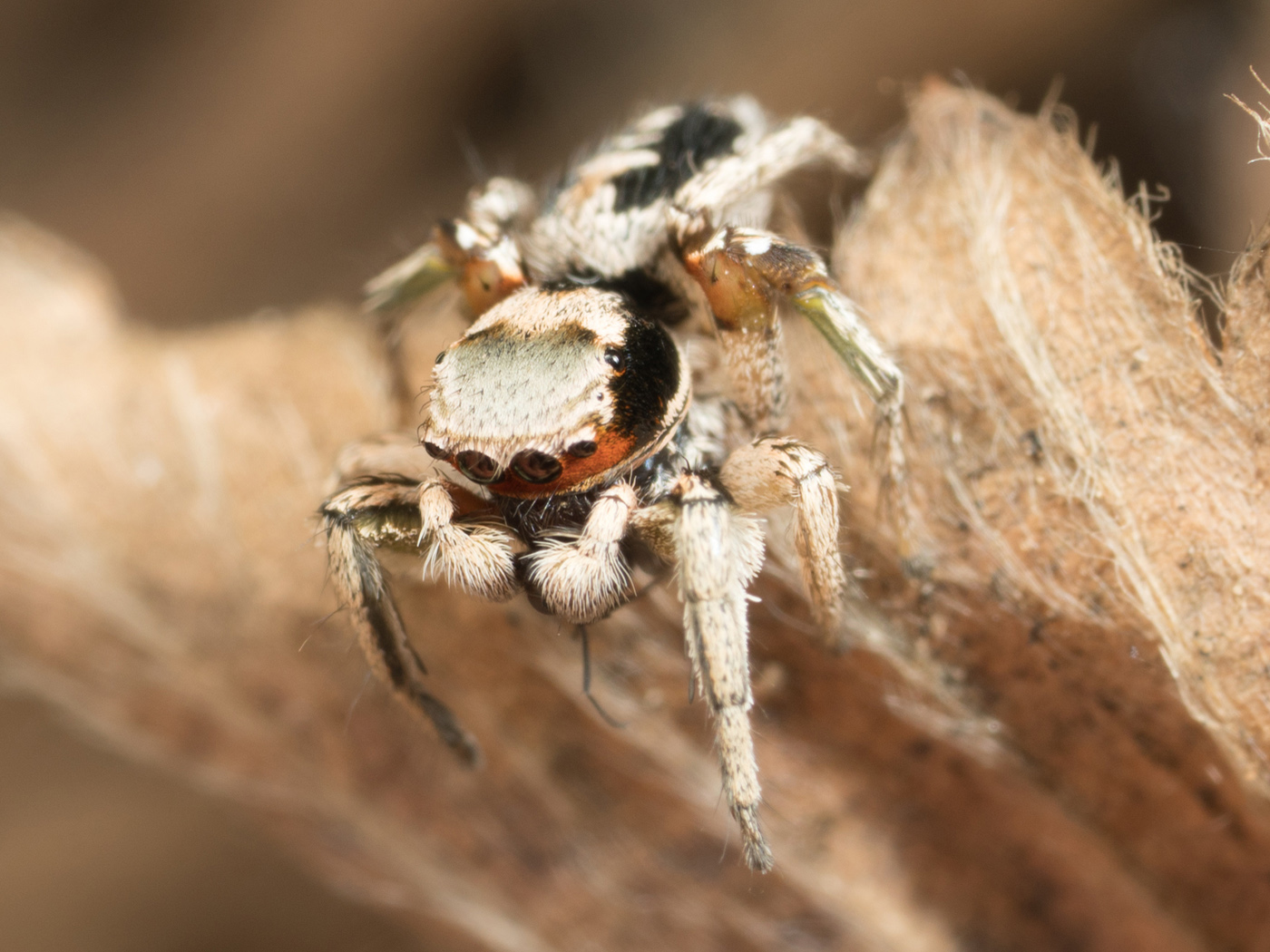
- Male from La Habra, California

Scientific classification
- Kingdom: Animalia
- Phylum: Arthropoda
- Subphylum: Chelicerata
- Class: Arachnida
- Order: Araneae
- Infraorder: Araneomorphae
- Family: Salticidae
- Genus: Habronattus
- Species: H. pyrrithrix

Binomial name
- Habronattus pyrrithrix (Chamberlin, 1924)

= Habronattus pyrrithrix =

Species of spider

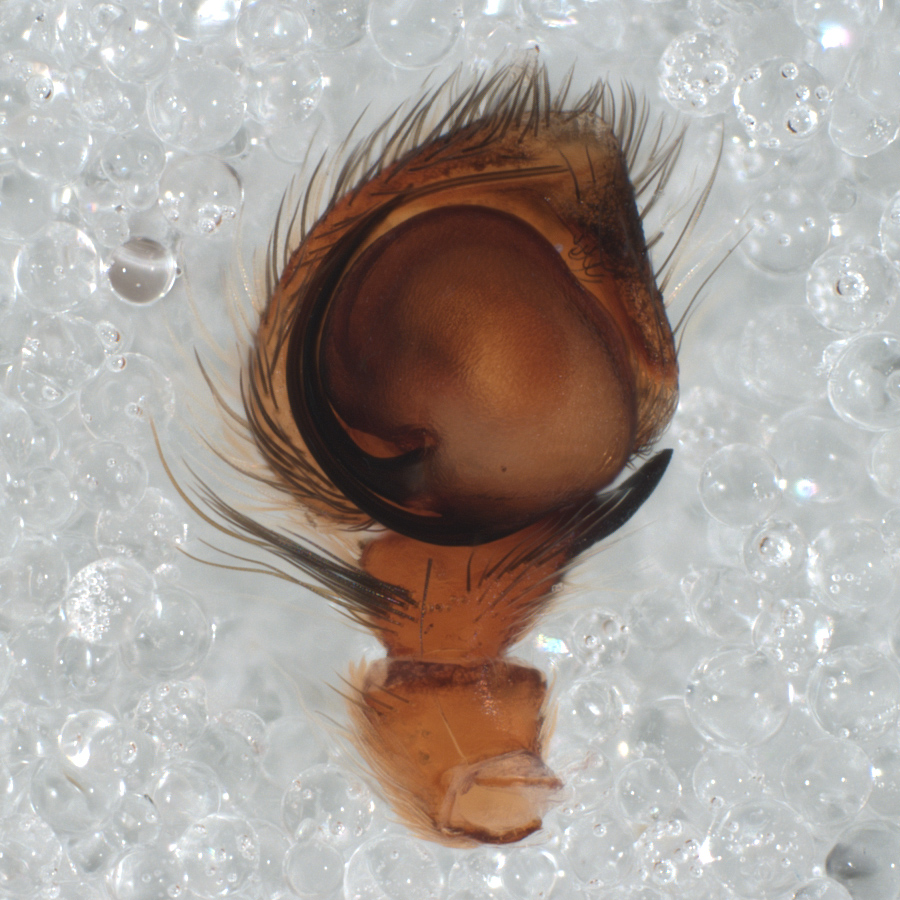
Male pedipalp

Habronattus pyrrithrix is a species of jumping spider in the family Salticidae. It is found in the southwestern United States and western Mexico.

A key predator is the larger jumping spider Phidippus californicus.

The males have bold black stripes, but the females have uniform coloration. The stripes are not known to confer any advantage.

== Habitat and Diet ==
Habronattus pyrrithrix is found in grassy areas covered in plant material or by bodies of water. They feed on various prey, including flies, caterpillars, aphids, and other spiders. They display a color preference when foraging by avoiding yellow or red-colored prey. This may be because red and yellow colors are linked with prey that are capable of utilizing chemical defenses, such as ladybugs, and may be harmful if consumed by predators.

== Mating and Reproduction ==
=== Sexual dimorphism ===
Habronattus pyrrithrix displays sexual dimorphism with respect to their size and coloration. Females are cryptically colored with brown and grey coloration, which makes it easier for them to blend into the environment. Females are also larger than males, posing a risk for males during courtship as they can easily become victims of cannibalism. Male H. pyrrithrix display bright condition-dependent coloration with distinct red faces and green legs. The condition-dependent colors depend on the diet of the males, with higher-quality diets resulting in brighter coloration. This bright coloration on the males also helps signify their quality and age to females during courtship. Males will court whatever females they encounter, which can lead to aggression by females from other species. The colors improve species recognition so that males can present themselves to and be recognized by females of the same species. Sexual selection favors the distinct coloration and morphologies found in males and drives the diversification of this species from others in the genus. While the condition-dependent coloration of males is a beneficial signifier of their quality, they do not always increase mating success. The red coloration may play a bigger role in species recognition, and it is other traits, such as body size or condition, that females prefer; further understanding of why some traits are preferred by females over others during mate choice is required.

=== Courtship ===
H. pyrrithrix males use multimodal displays when courting females, including complex movements, vibrations, and signals on top of their distinct coloration. Courtship occurs in a range of environments, from open to shaded areas. The advantage the males' bright colors provide varies with the environment, as courtship success improves when males display their colors in the sun. When courting in more shaded areas, the red coloration of the males' faces may not be as prominent, thus requiring females to assess males via male body size or their seismic signals/vibrations. During their complex courtship displays, male H. pyrrithrix approaches females with zig-zag movements and waving legs while closing the distance between them. They make sure to stay front-facing with the females in order to keep their attention. Females tend to move around during a male's courtship display, which may be why males rely on more than just visual displays to capture a mate's attention. Males then produce substrate-borne vibrations, along with leg flicks, by striking their abdomen against the substrate they are on, which produces vibrations or seismic signals sensed by the females. If females seem receptive and safe to approach, males then mount and engage in copulation. The combination of visual and substrate-borne displays increases male reproductive success and decreases cannibalism by unimpressed females. Sexual cannibalism in this species is a form of sexual conflict in which the males do not gain any benefits from being eaten by the females. Only the females benefit from this conflict as they are able to gain a source of nutrition, while the males cannot pass on their genome. Therefore, it is beneficial to the males to successfully court females so that they are receptive to them. In some instances, females may show higher aggression toward the males they deem are in better condition; these aggressive behaviors could be another way in which females assess the quality of the male and their ability to overcome the risk that comes with mating. This combination of displays also reduces the courtship time, allowing the individuals to choose mates quickly and spend less time exposed to the risk of predation.

== Predator Deception ==
Males risk predation when they are searching for mates or engage in courtship behaviors. Male Habronattus pyrrithrix spend more time than females when moving around their environment and finding an individual to mate with. Accompanied by their bright coloration, this increased movement in open habitats places males at a higher risk of gaining predator attention. Males combat this risk with their clearly visible dorsal patterns. These patterns are not used for courtship displays and are not bright in coloration. H. pyrrithrix males display these dorsal patterns in addition to leg-waving to mimic the antennas of wasps or bees and deceive predators. The higher rates of movement in males versus females preserve the evolution of cryptic dorsal coloration in both individuals. Further studies on non-display colorations and predator deception in Habronattus could provide a look into the evolution of diverse color patterns.
