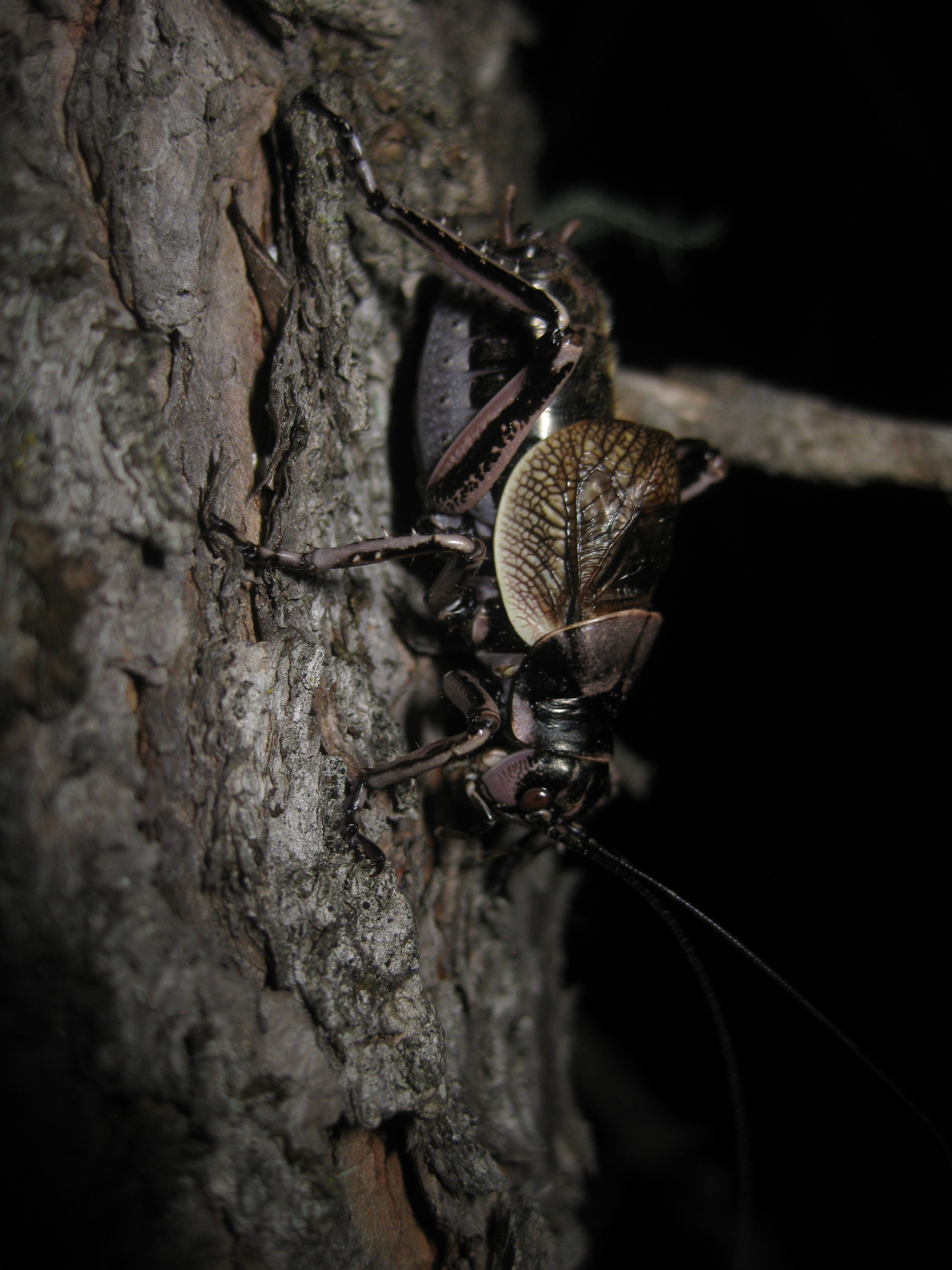
- An adult male

Scientific classification
- Domain: Eukaryota
- Kingdom: Animalia
- Phylum: Arthropoda
- Class: Insecta
- Order: Orthoptera
- Suborder: Ensifera
- Family: Prophalangopsidae
- Genus: Cyphoderris
- Species: C. monstrosa

Binomial name
- Cyphoderris monstrosa Uhler, 1864

= Cyphoderris monstrosa =

Species of cricket-like animal

Cyphoderris monstrosa, also known as the great grig, is a species of hump-winged grig in the family Prophalangopsidae. Though the fossil record shows at least 90 extinct species from this family, C. monstrosa is one of only 7 known species alive today.

== Morphology ==
The species generally grows to about 20–30 mm in body length and approximately 1.5 grams in weight. Dorsally, these crickets have dark coloring, ranging from lighter hues of brown to black. Ventrally they are lighter in color, often being white or beige in color. This coloration likely evolved as a form of camouflage, helping the crickets blend in with the darker bark of coniferous trees, on which they spend a significant portion of their time. Like many crickets Cyphoderris montrosa males produce mating calls. They do so through stridulation, a process in which they scrape specialized file-like stimulatory organs located on their tegmina along scrapers located at the rear end of each of each opposite tegmen. In C. monstrosa these file like structures are evenly developed along each tegmen, with a rigid dorsal portion angled at 90 degrees to a rigid lateral portion. Both males and females also have a structure called an Ander's organ. This organ appears to be present across all life stages of the species, unlike the scrapers on the tegmina which are only present in adult males. This organ also produces sound, however studies show that it is predominantly used by female and juvenile individuals, with males showing a preference to use their tegmina for sound production. Male C. monstrosa can be identified from other similar looking species by the presence of a prominent hook shape on the ventral side of their subgenital plate.

== Habitat and diet ==
Cyphoderris monstrosa is distributed throughout much of the northwestern United States and southwestern Canada, ranging from as far south as northern California, up to southern Alberta and British Columbia. Its preferred habitat is coniferous forests containing lodgepole pine and Engelmann spruce. They primarily feed on the pollen of coniferous trees, though they are also known to feed on flowers and fruits from other plants and occasionally small insects.

== Mating ==
=== Courtship behaviours ===
Males begin calling at sundown. Their calls are described as sounding like "faint, elusive, high-pitched trills" that have a "ventriloquistic nature". These calls are produced both to advertise the cricket's presence in an attempt to attract potential female mates, and to repel rival males. If males ever do come into contact with each other they engage in territorial disputes in which they face each other and begin calling directly at one another while displaying aggressive body language. Sometimes males will engage with each other physically, however, in a study done by Andrew C. Mason, the length of time a male is able to spend singing is a true indicator of a male cricket's ability to repel attackers: the longer a male is able to sing, the greater his success in repelling rival males. When males select a microhabitat in which to sing, tests may indicate that they have a preference for large trees or clumps of trees but an indifference towards tree species. Overall their leg tympana are similar but less differentiated from regular cuticle than those from the family Tettigonidae.

The species display a mating ritual unique to the family, in which during copulation the females will feed upon the hind wings of the males. This behavior has caused another species of grig, C. buckelli, females to occasionally mate with younger C. monstrosa individuals to engage in sexual cannibalism in order to obtain resources, with this behavior being more prevalent in starved females. However, there is no evidence of hybridization in the wild, suggesting the existence of some kind of postmating reproductive barrier.

=== Life cycle ===
Like all Orthoptera, this species undergoes incomplete metamorphosis. The late instar nymphs overwinter in autumn and emerge in spring, usually developing into adults and mating throughout June, July, and August.

== Predator defense ==
The species has been shown to produce rapid ultrasonic frequency pulses as an anti-predator defense mechanism through the use of a structure known as the Ander's organ. Though this structure is present in both males and females, only females and juvenile individuals appear to utilize the structure during physical contact, with males opting to use their tegmina. The peak frequency of these pulses was found to be 58 ±15.5 kHz with a bandwidth of 40 to 90 kHz. The pulses are made in rapid succession of about 69.1 ±22.3 pulses per second. In some cases ultrasonic pulses are also accompanied by aggressive posturing such as mandible opening and, while on their backs, leg kicking.
