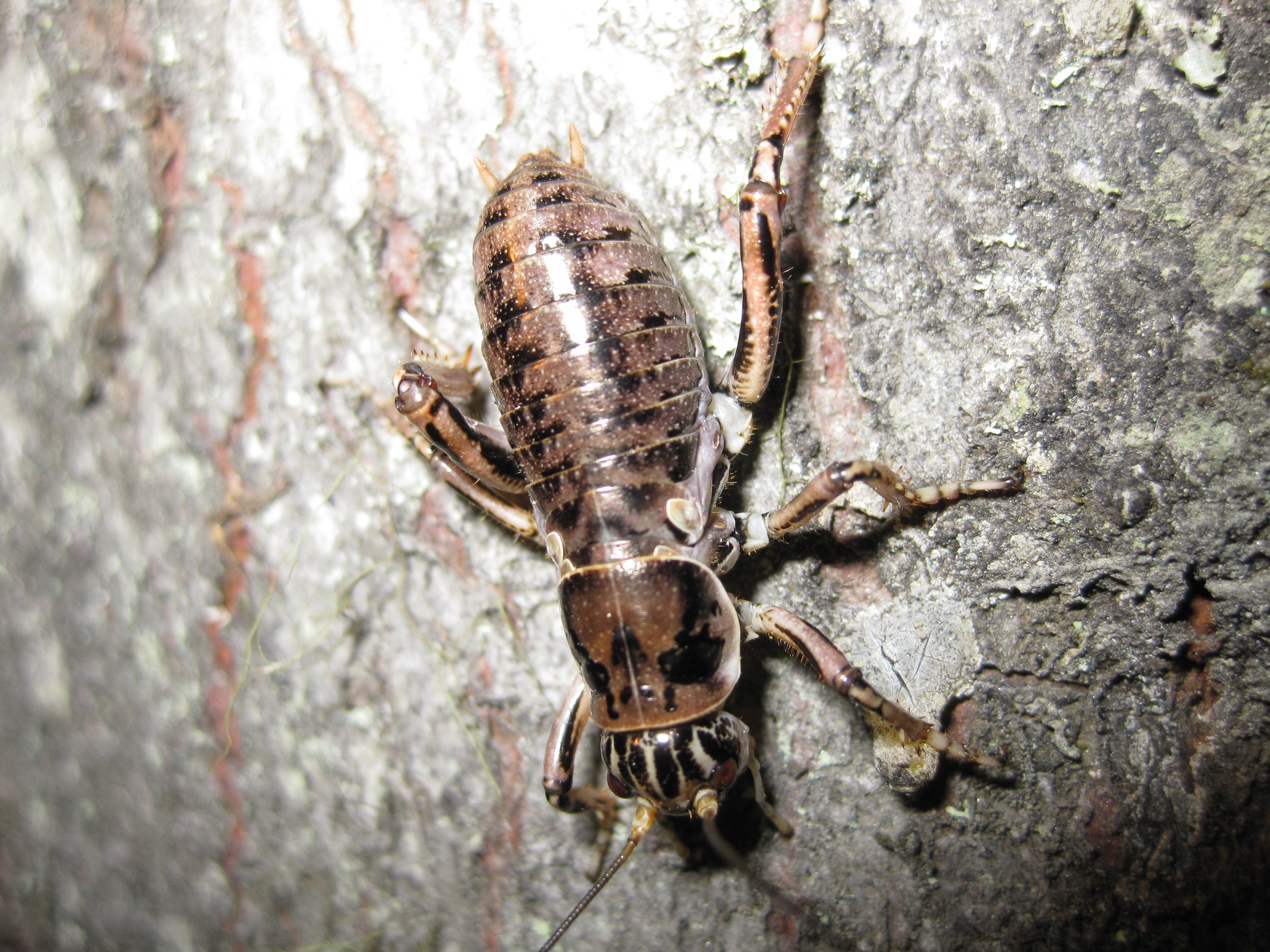
- Female Cyphoderris buckelli

Scientific classification
- Domain: Eukaryota
- Kingdom: Animalia
- Phylum: Arthropoda
- Class: Insecta
- Order: Orthoptera
- Suborder: Ensifera
- Family: Prophalangopsidae
- Genus: Cyphoderris; Uhler, 1864

Species
- see text

= Hump-winged grig =

Genus of cricket-like animals

Hump-winged grigs are insects belonging to the genus Cyphoderris, in the family Prophalangopsidae, and superfamily Grylloidea (crickets). In modern times they are known only in northwestern North America and central Asia, but the fossil record indicates a wider distribution in the past.

There are three species in North America:

- Cyphoderris buckelli - Buckell's grig
- Cyphoderris monstrosa - Great grig
- Cyphoderris strepitans - Sagebrush grig

Hump-winged grigs are known for their unique mating habits. Males call at night by sitting on a tree trunk with their head down and emitting a short, high-pitched trill. When a female mounts the male, the male uses two hooks on its back to hold onto the underside of the female's abdomen while transferring spermatophore. During copulation, the female eats the male's hind wings and drinks the male's hemolymph for energy, causing permanent but nonfatal damage to the male. Hungry females are more likely to mate, will mount males sooner, and are less selective when choosing mating partners. "Virgin" males, with no hind wing damage, are generally more successful at mating than non-virgin males.
