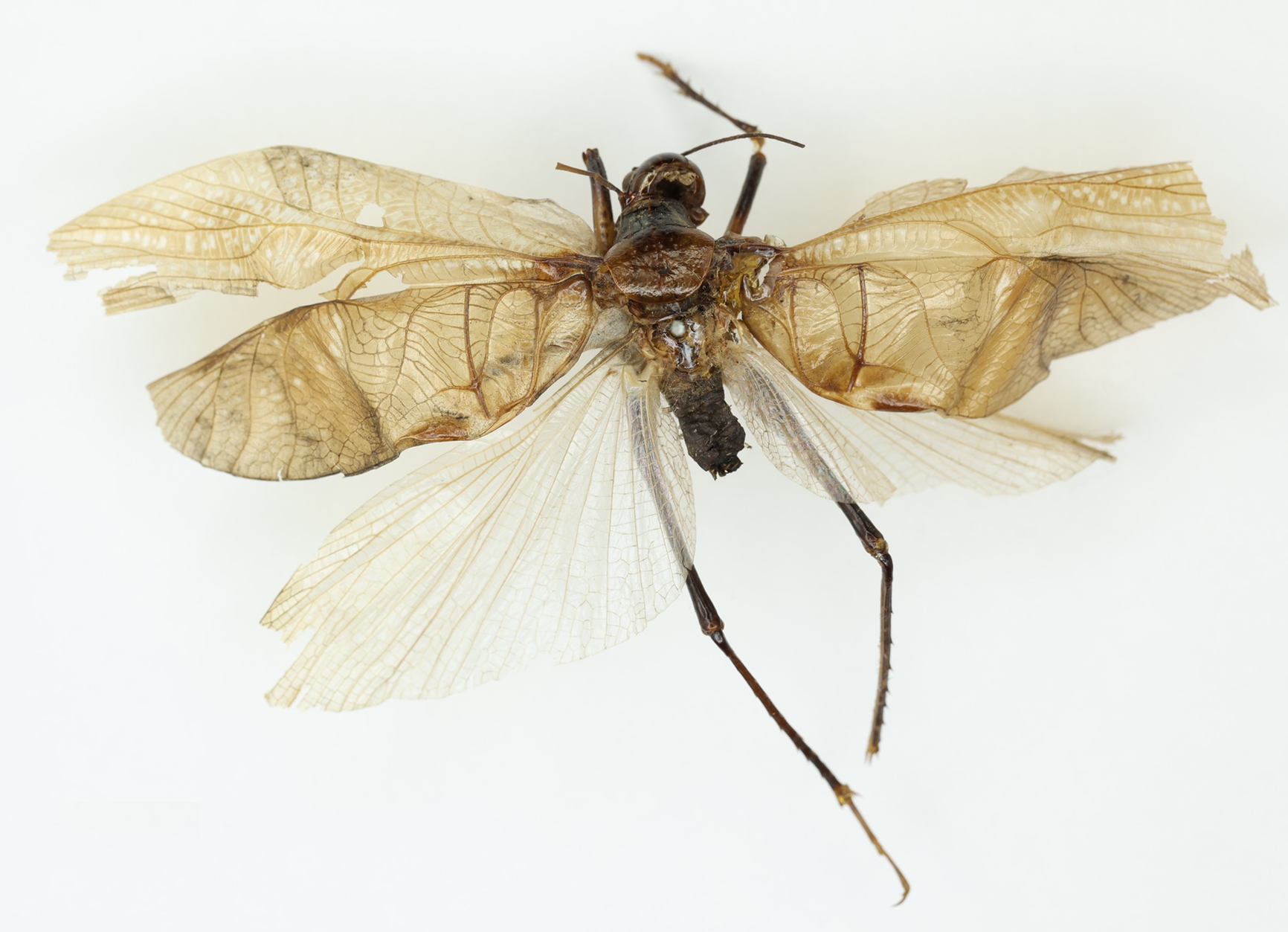
- Prophalangopsis obscura, dorsal view

Scientific classification
- Kingdom: Animalia
- Phylum: Arthropoda
- Clade: Pancrustacea
- Class: Insecta
- Order: Orthoptera
- Suborder: Ensifera
- Family: Prophalangopsidae
- Genus: Prophalangopsis
- Species: P. obscura

Binomial name
- Prophalangopsis obscura (Walker, F., 1869)

Synonyms
- Tarraga obscura Walker, F., 1869

= Prophalangopsis =

Genus of cricket-like animals

Prophalangopsis is a South Asian insect genus, in the family Prophalangopsidae, distantly related to crickets and other Ensifera, erected by Francis Walker in 1869. There is one species: Prophalangopsis obscura, which is a winged insect species found in North India and the Tibetan Plateau. It is one of only a few surviving species in the family Prophalangopsidae. F. Walker described it in 1869 from a single male specimen from India. (Note: Walker identified the location as Hindustan, which is present-day India. Sir John Bennet Hearsey, a British army officer stationed in North India, collected the specimen.) Liu et al collected two possible female specimens in 2009.

== Bioacoustic modeling ==
In 2022, researchers attempted to recreate the call that P. obscura would make with its legs by using 3D scanning, microscopy, and a Laser Doppler vibrometer.

== Gallery ==
Reconstructed calling song of Prophalangopsis obscura
This is an attempt to reconstruct the calling song of Prophalangopsis obscura by using 3D scanning, microscopy, and a Laser Doppler vibrometer.

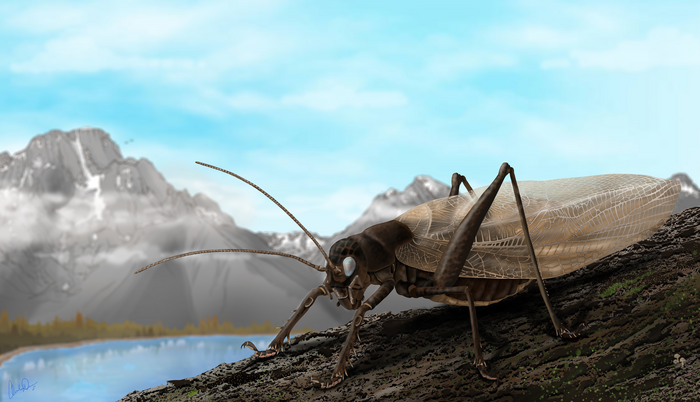
Charlie Woodrow, Prophalangopsis obscura (2022)

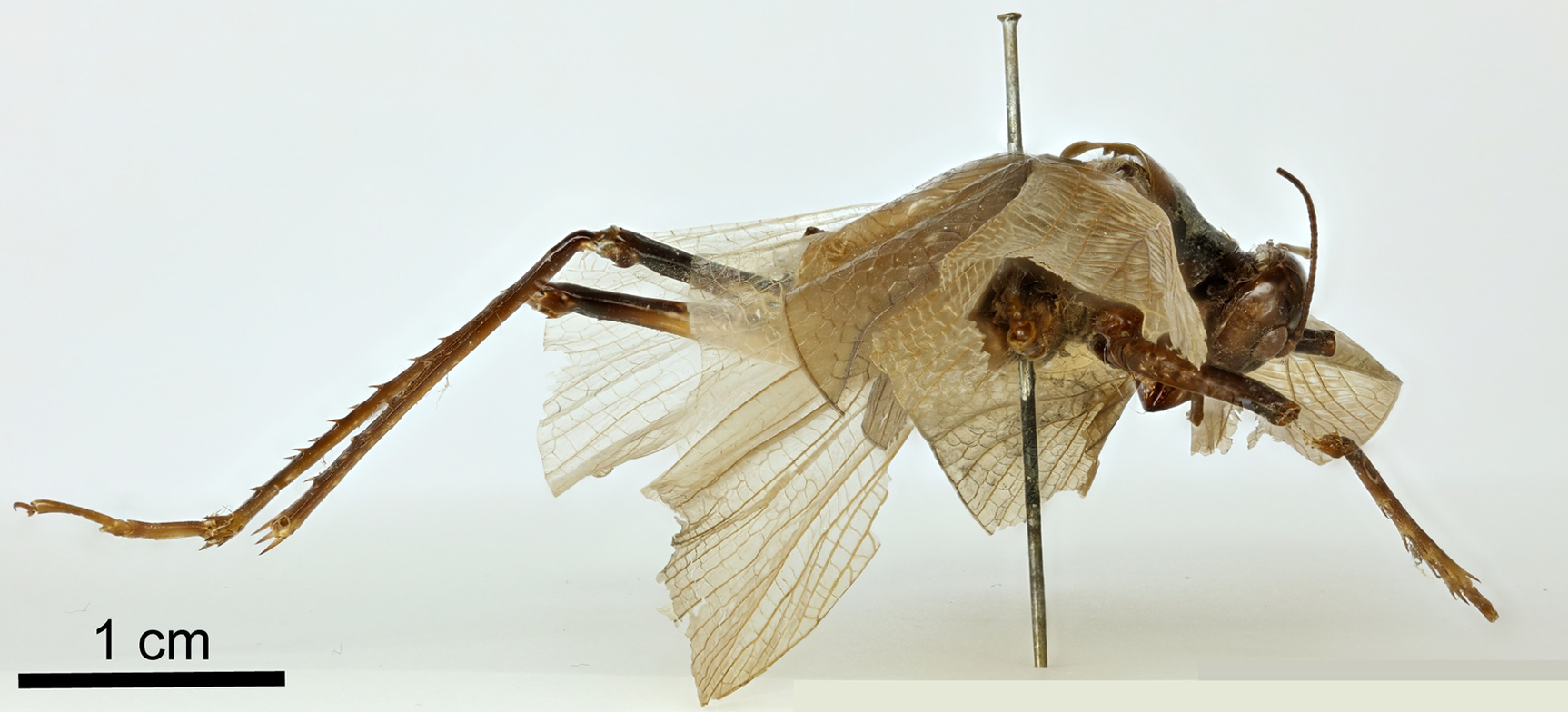
The lateral habitus of a P. obscura specimen collected in India.

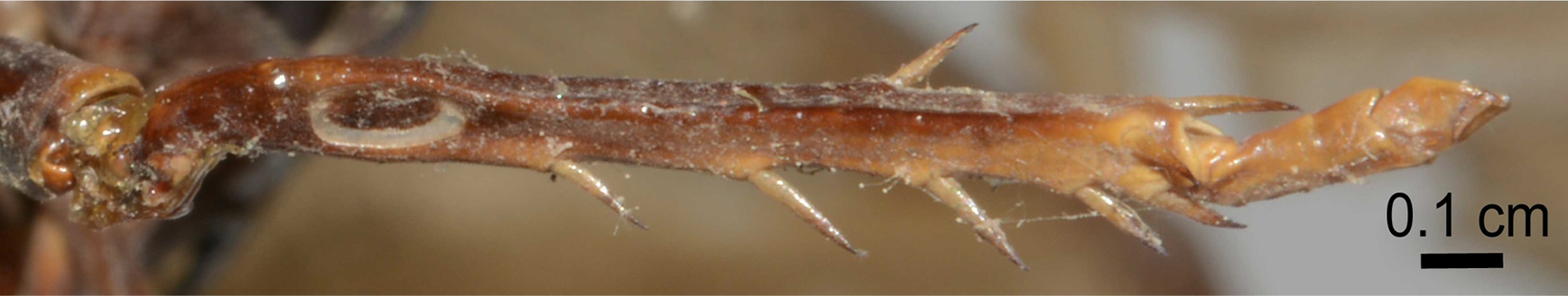
The tympanal organ of a P. obscura specimen collected in India.
