= John Bennet Hearsey =

British military officer

Sir John Hearsey
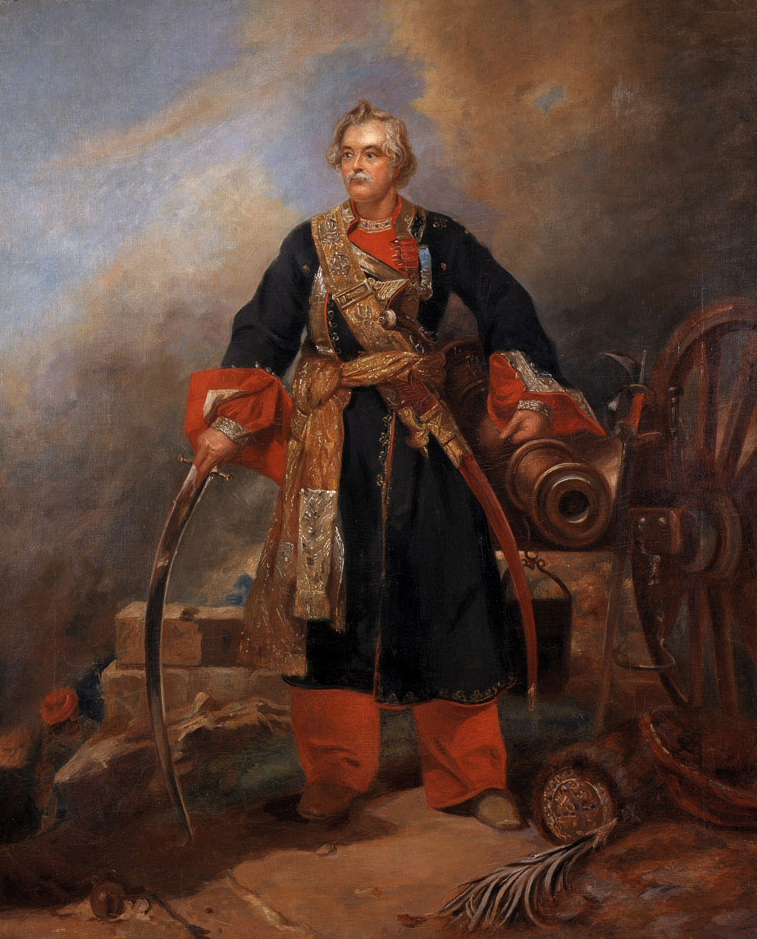
- 1839 portrait
- Born: John Bennet Hearsey; 21 January 1793; Midnapore, West Bengal
- Died: 23 November 1865 (aged 72); Boulogne-sur-Mer, France
- Spouse: Harriet Zihur-Ul-Nissa (m. 1832–1848)
- Military career
- Allegiance: British India; East India Company
- Branch: Bengal Army
- Service years: 1808–1865
- Rank: Lieutenant-General
- Conflicts: Battle of Sitabuldi; Siege of Bharatpur; Second Anglo-Sikh War
- Awards: Knight Commander of the Order of the Bath

Lieutenant-General Sir John Bennet Hearsey KCB FLS (21 January 1793 – 23 October 1865) was a British military officer who was colonel of the 21st Hussars and of the 3rd Bengal Light Cavalry. He was also an amateur naturalist and entomologist and collected a large number of insects from Asia.

== Biography ==
Hearsey was born in Midnapore, West Bengal, the son of Lieutenant-Colonel Andrew Wilson Hearsey and Charlotte Crane. At the time of his birth, his father commanded the 9th Native Infantry at Midnapore.

He married his half-niece Harriet Zihur-Ul-Nissa, the only daughter of his half-brother Maj. Hyder Young Hearsey and the Khanum Zihur-ul-nissa. His mother-in-law was the daughter of the deposed Prince of Cambay. They had four sons and three daughters. After her death in London, he married Emma Rumball, with whom he had four sons and a daughter. Emma died in 1865.

He died in Boulogne-sur-Mer, France, from complications of bronchitis, aged 72. He was the great-uncle of Archdeacon Henry Hearsey.

== Career ==
Hearsey enlisted in the British Indian army in 1808. He was promoted to lieutenant in 1809, captain in 1819, major in 1833, lieutenant colonel in 1838, brevet colonel in 1849, colonel in 1852, major general in 1854, and lieutenant general in 1862.

In 1817, Hearsey fought at the battle of Sitabuldi and the 1825–26 siege and capture of Bhurtpore. During the Second Anglo-Sikh War in 1848-49, he fought at Battle of Chillianwala and Battle of Gujrat, and commanded the cavalry in the final pursuit and surrender of the Sikh army. He was injured in battle several times during his career.

In 1857, he was the commanding officer at Barrackpore when sepoy Mangal Pandey attempted to start a mutiny and was threatening to shoot British officers. When confronted by Maj.-Gen. Hearsey and ordered to surrender, Pandey shot himself but survived. He and another Indian sepoy—who had refused to arrest Pandey—were later hanged, despite Pandey's pleas that he had been under the influence of opium and bhang at the time of his actions. The incident contributed to the Indian Rebellion of 1857. In July 1857, he was appointed a Knight Commander of the Order of the Bath for his role in suppressing the rebellion.

== Naturalist ==
Hearsey had a keen interest in insects, collecting specimens from South Asia. He was elected a Fellow of the Linnean Society of London in 1847. He regularly exhibited his specimens from China and India, which were of great interest to British entomologists.

Prophalangopsis obscura, a winged insect species found North India, was identified in 1865 by Francis Walker from Hearsey's specimen. His collection was a significant source for John O. Westwood's illustrated book Cabinet of Oriental Entomology; Being a Selection of Some of the Rarer and More Beautiful Species of Insects, Natives of India and the Adjacent Islands (1848). Species named after Hearsey include the stalk-eyed fly Sphyracephala hearseiana.

Hearsey's entomological and botanical diary (1838–1846) is held at the Oxford University Museum of Natural History.

== Gallery ==
John O. Westwood's illustrations from Cabinet of Oriental Entomology based on Hearsey's collection:

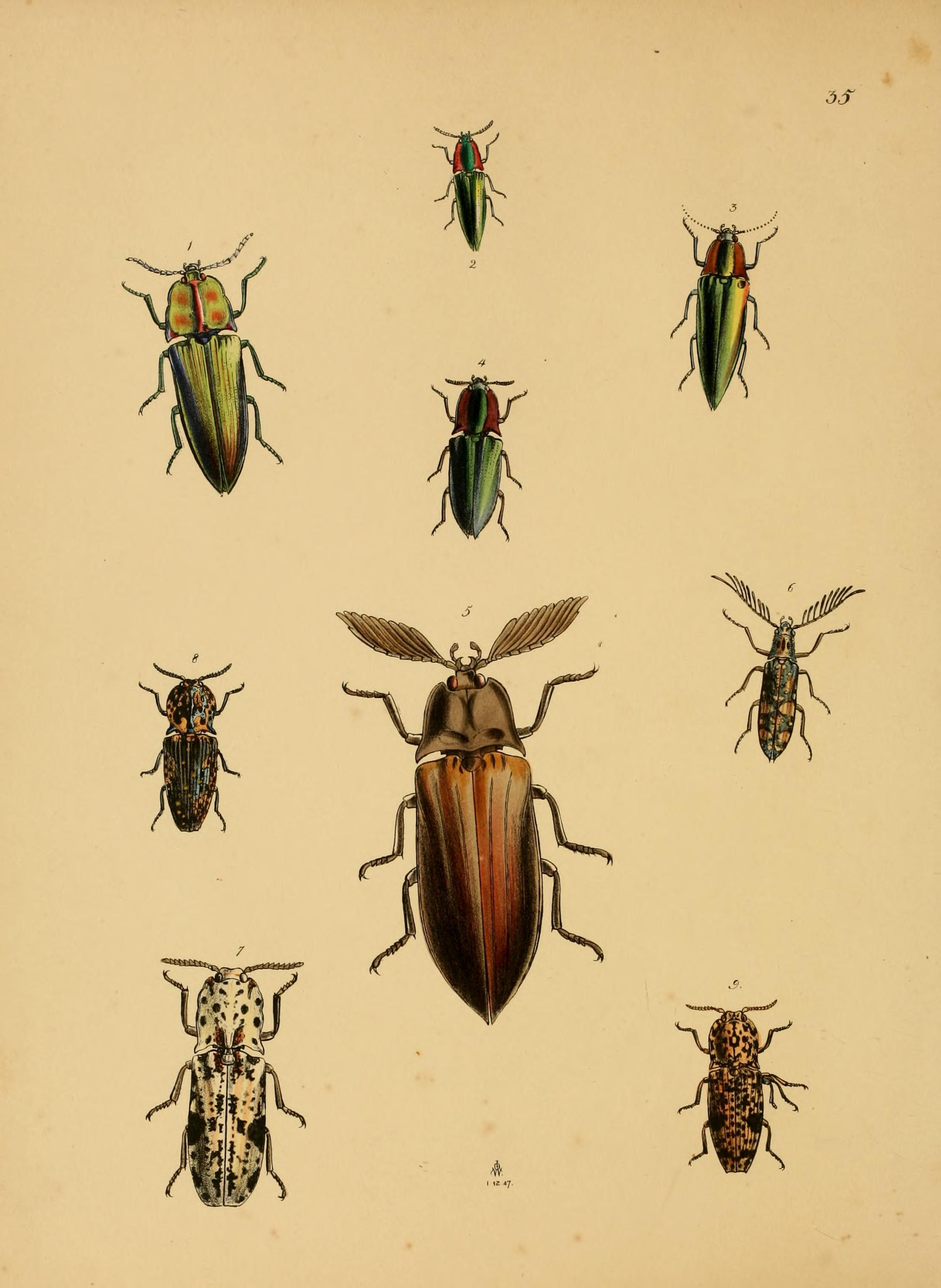
Campsosternus templetonii

Hestia lasonia

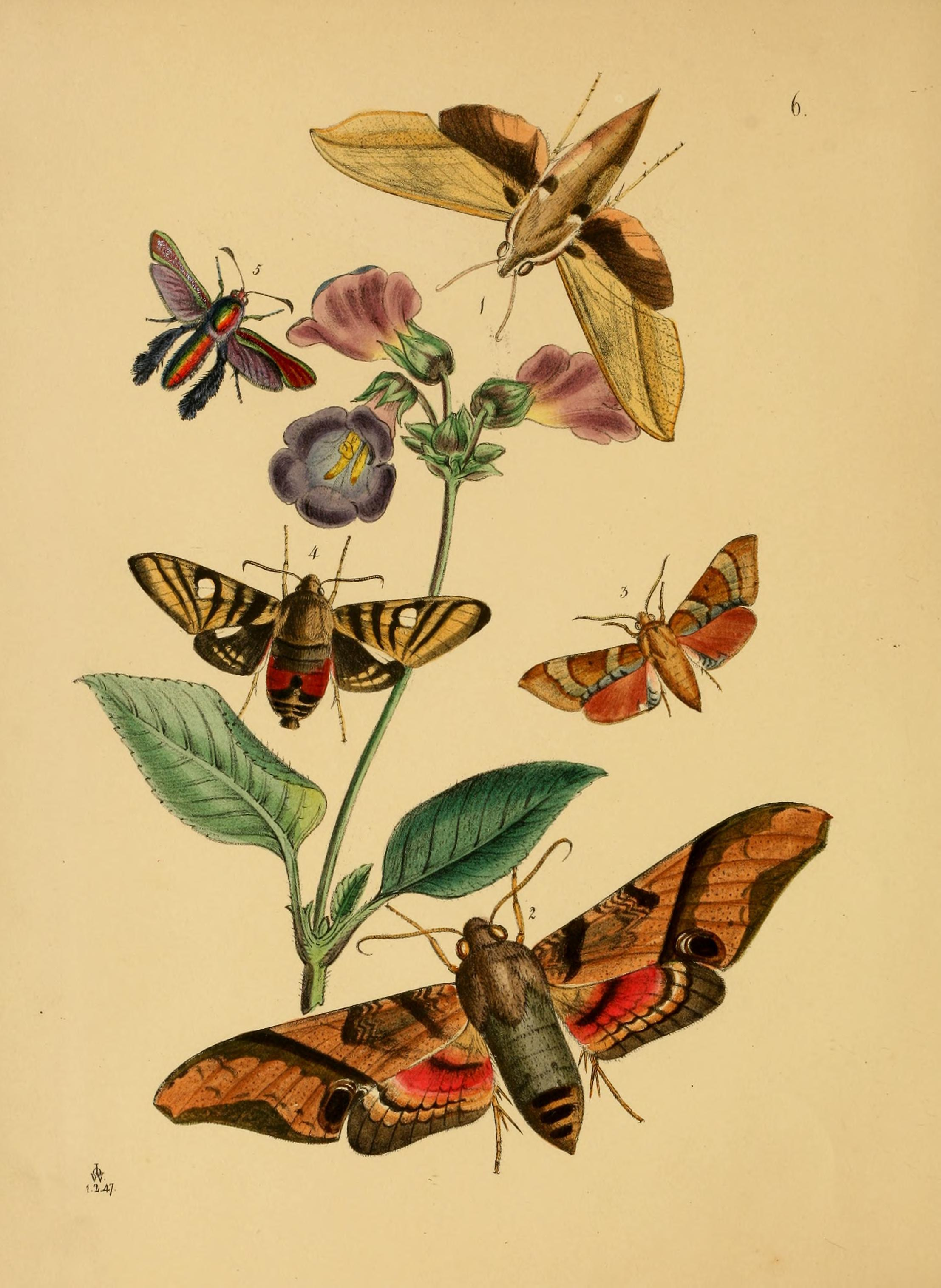
Deilephila cyrene

Charaxes Psaphon

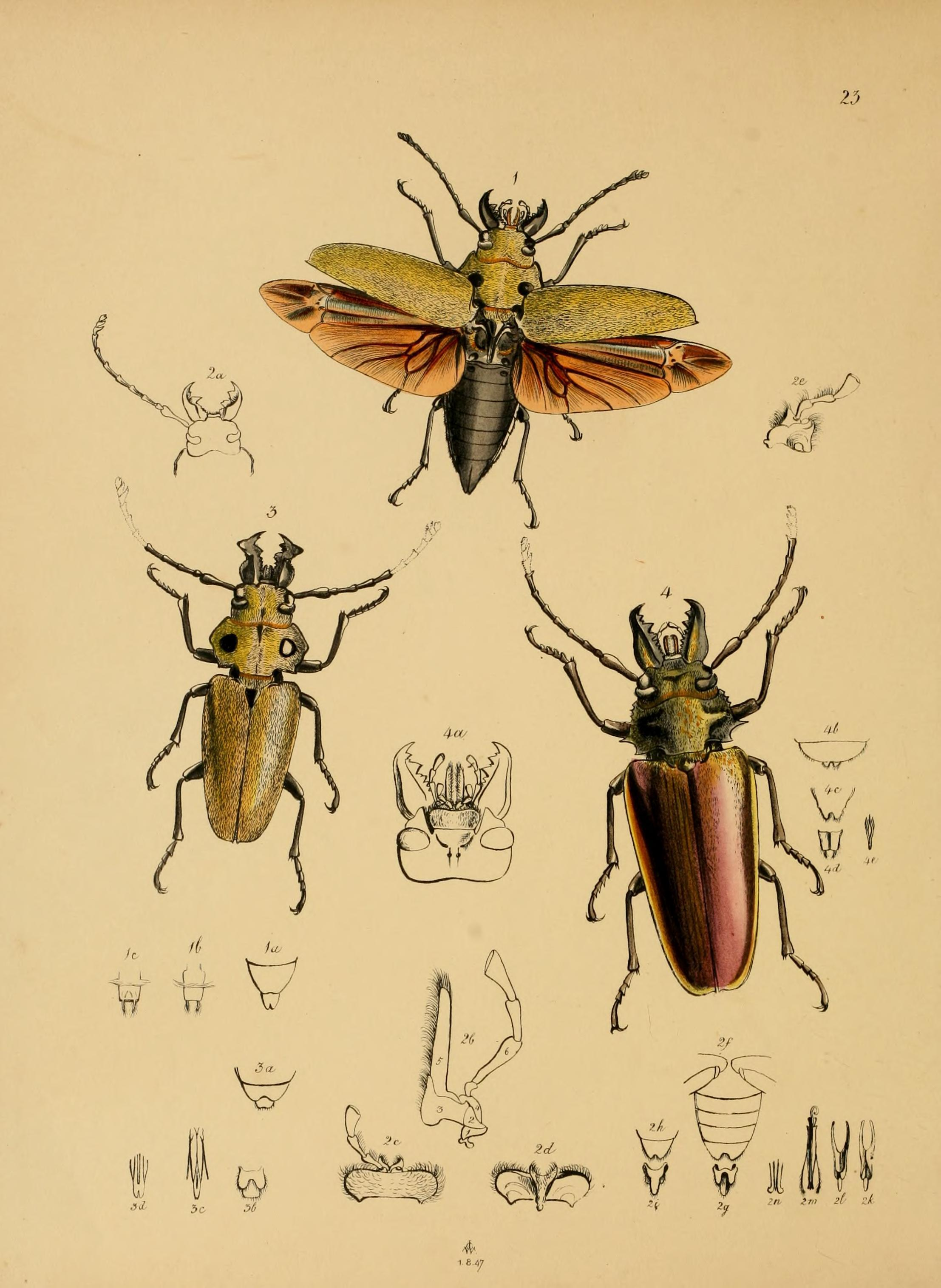

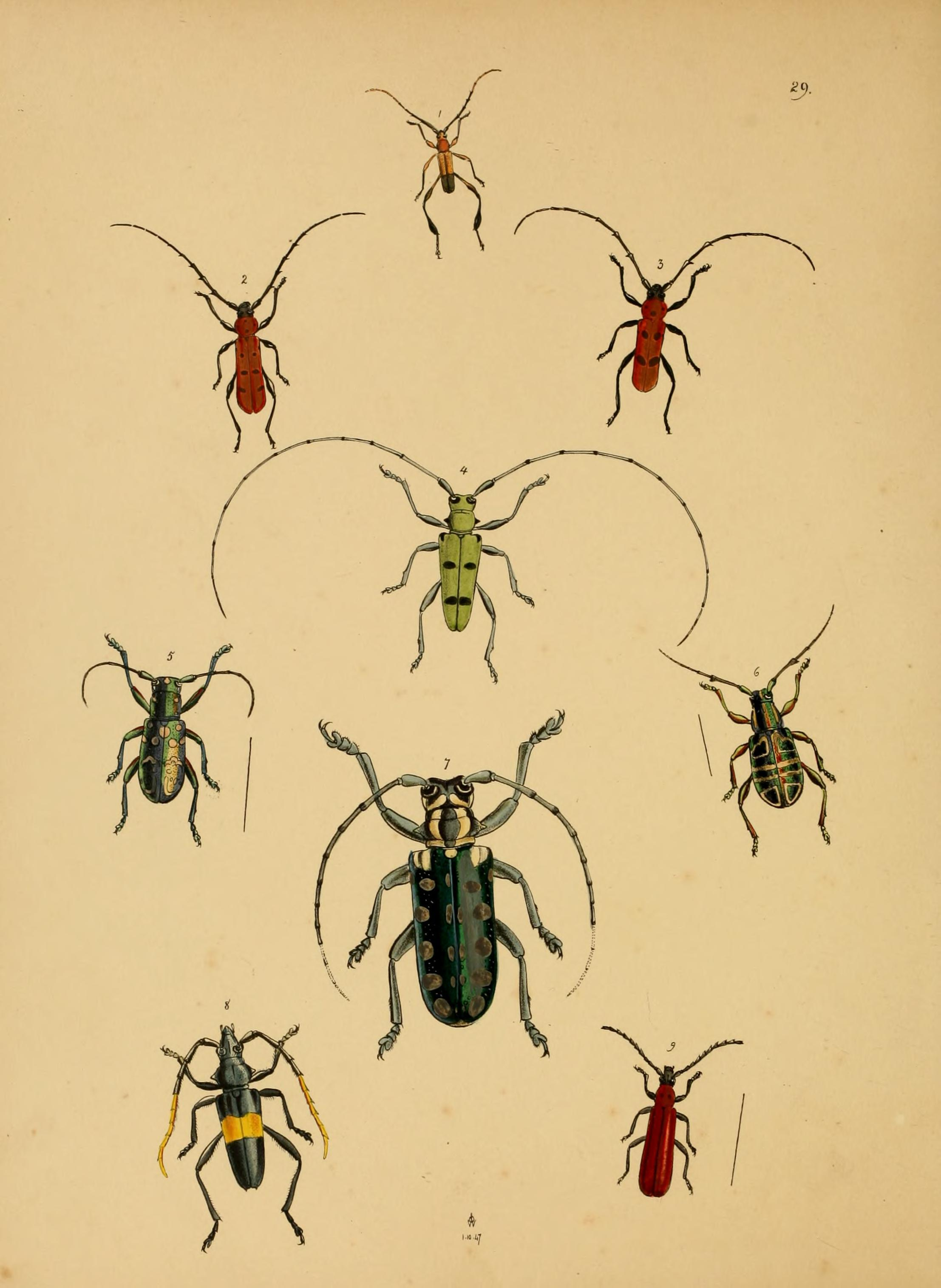
