= Condition-dependent signaling =

Condition-dependent signaling is a component of sexual selection. Its exact definition remains elusive due to the vagueness of the terms "condition" and "signaling". It examines which conditions favor the extravagant displays and ornaments, or signals, some organisms poses, despite their lack of evolutionary value in terms of fitness.

Condition-dependent signaling can affect individual mating tactics and depend on an individual's size, age, or other physical factors, such as a more fit individual being able to produce a stronger call than its less fit cohort. It can also impact the signaling choices of organisms based on the environment around them, like vocalizations that are more favorable in lower density environments.

== Background ==
It is energetically expensive to produce a sexual signal. In some organisms the sexual signal may also have costs in terms of predation. For example, the ornate tail of a peacock makes it more difficult to hide and it also impedes flight. There are also different sexual phenotypes which may change the method of attempted copulation.

There may be several male reproductive phenotypes within a species and the phenotype that is manifest may be determined by a number of factors. For example, some phenotypes may employ a more aggressive and direct mating tactic while other phenotypes may use less traditional methods, as is the case with bluegill sunfish, where males use a "sneaking" tactic to find mating opportunities. Previous research has shown a great plasticity in sexual signals based on conditional qualities such as food availability, body condition, environmental conditions, population dynamics, and sexual displays. Condition dependent signaling is an important part of sexual selection theory.

For example, if an organism under selection where the sexual signals will not be as effective or they are in an environment lacking in energy, they may allocate less energy toward sexual selection. Condition dependent signaling research seeks to understand the true plasticity of sexual traits and determine if they may be more or less favored under different types of environmental stress.

== Acoustic Calling ==
Individual tactics have been difficult to determine on a case-by-case basis, so research continues to examine the conditions and correlate it to changes in the mating tactics. Acoustic calling is a common mating tactic which can be affected by food availability, and female presence.

=== Food Availability ===
In one study researchers conducted an experiment to better understand condition dependent signaling of acoustic calling in relation to food availability. They studied crickets in the wild where they supplemented the experimental groups food supply to see if that would allow the males to allocate more energy toward calling. In comparison to the males in the control group, where the food had not been supplemented, the males in the experimental group were able to call more frequently. The food supplementation had an effect on the frequency of calls however the call itself remained consistent between the experimental and control group. This higher frequency of calls was effective in increasing the attraction of female crickets. This study concluded that condition dependent signaling is an imperative part of how females select their male partners in natural conditions.

=== Weight and female presence ===
Acoustic calling may be affected by an organism's physical characteristics which can be affected in turn by the environmental condition. In areas of food and water abundance the organisms may be healthier and better able to allocate more resources toward producing the acoustic calls. Another experiment examining vocalization studied tree frogs. The researchers recorded the calls of the male frogs in two different conditions. In one condition females were present and in the other they were absent. Both weight and condition affected the male frog's ability to call. The smaller males and the males that were in the best condition showed higher plasticity.

== Effect of phenotype and mating tactics ==
In many species there are different mating tactics and they are displayed through multiple reproductive behavioral phenotypes and the different phenotypes have different advantages. These phenotypes, which have different sexual signaling tactics, are selected with consideration to the organism's environmental conditions. If a species energetic reserves need to be conserved for a function other than signaling than the energetically low-cost phenotypes may be selected for, while in times of high energy a less energetically conservative tactic may be favored. There may be a dominant mating tactic that is used by the majority of the males. There could also be alternative mating phenotypes that are employed in different conditions that favor an alternative tactic

=== Satellites ===
For example, Satellite males are males that will locate themselves near another male making a call and attempt to intercept the mate that the calling male attracts in order to copulate. In a study examining satellite males among green tree frogs the frogs were shown to switch between satellites and caller depending on the conditions around them. In a high call density, more callers would switch to satellite in order to benefit from the calls being produced but if call density decreased satellites would switch to calling.

=== Sneakers ===
The bluegill sunfish is a striking example of using an alternative mating tactic in conditions were the smaller males are not favored by the direct method. There is a direct method in this species dependent on typical sexual signaling such as size and coloring and they are referred to as 'Parentals'. However, another method used by some less traditionally favorable males of the species is to disguise themselves as the female of the species in order to sneak past the more traditionally competitive males in order to copulate and fertilize the female. They are referred to as Sneakers. This species also has Satellites. Satellites and Sneakers use the alternative method of female mimicry and sneaking to outcompete the Parental competitors who use a courting and guarding tactic.
