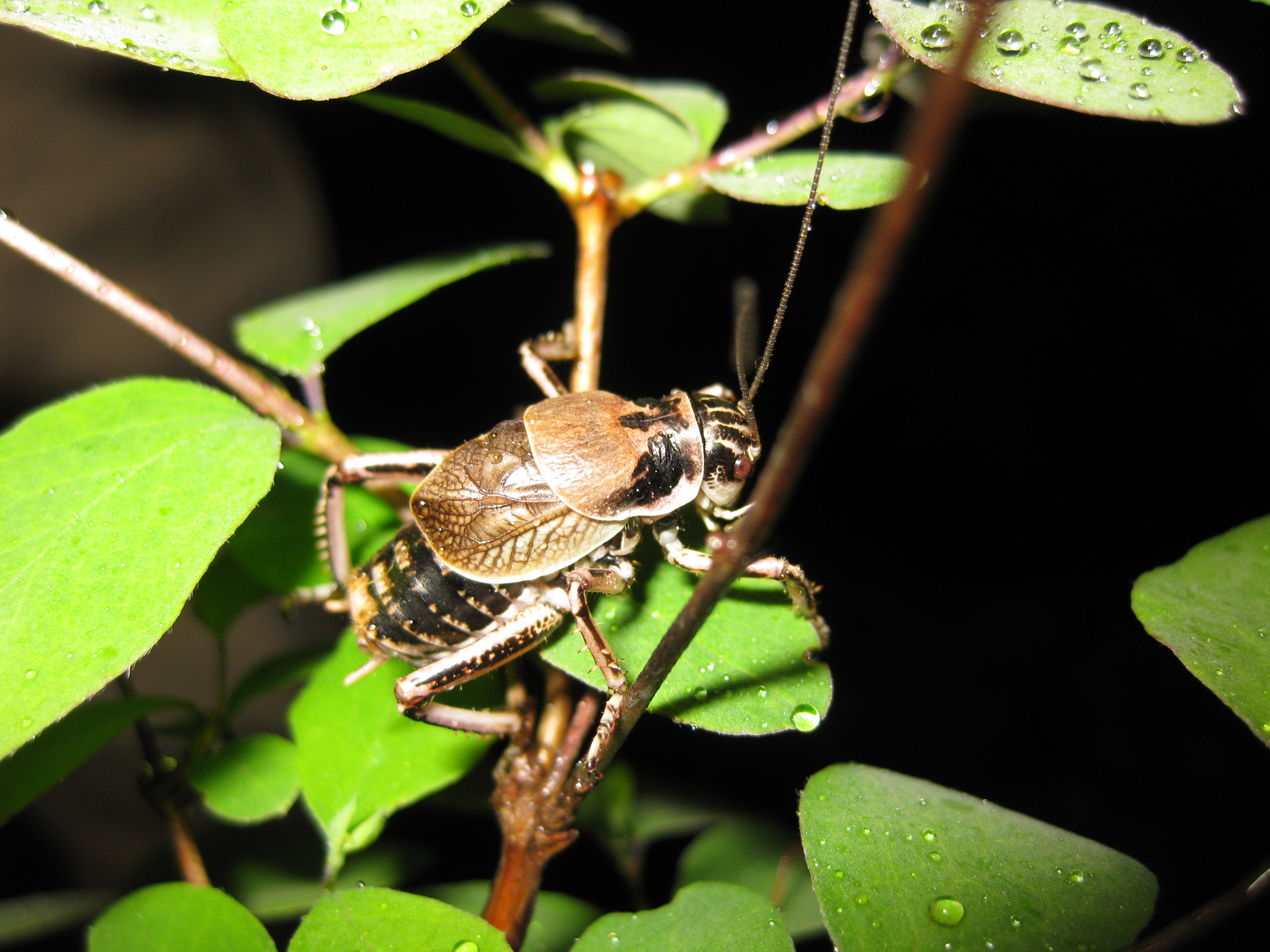

Scientific classification
- Domain: Eukaryota
- Kingdom: Animalia
- Phylum: Arthropoda
- Class: Insecta
- Order: Orthoptera
- Suborder: Ensifera
- Family: Prophalangopsidae
- Genus: Cyphoderris
- Species: C. buckelli

Binomial name
- Cyphoderris buckelli Hebard, 1933

= Cyphoderris buckelli =

Species of cricket-like animal

Cyphoderris buckelli, or Buckell's grig, is a species of hump-winged cricket in the family Prophalangopsidae.

== Distribution ==
It is found in North America.
