= Spider cannibalism =

Spiders consuming all or part of another individual of the same species as food

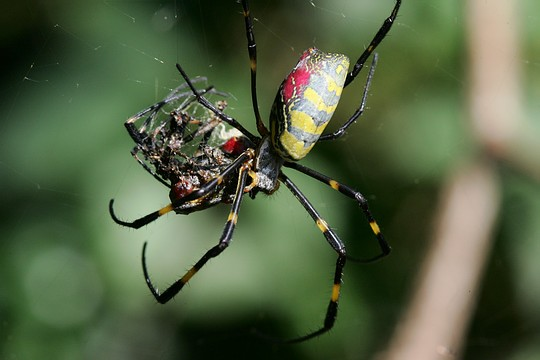
Nephila sp. consuming a conspecific (member of the same species)

Spider cannibalism is the act of a spider consuming all or part of another individual of the same species as food. It is most commonly seen as an example of female sexual cannibalism where a female spider kills and eats a male before, during, or after copulation. Cases of non-sexual cannibalism or male cannibalism of females both occur but are rare.

== Female cannibalism of males ==
A couple of Araneus diadematus. The courting male is wrapped by the female before it has successfully copulated.

Many cultures, such as South Africa and Slovakia, believe that the male (usually significantly smaller than the female, down to 1% of her size as seen in Tidarren sisyphoides) is likely to be killed by the female after the coupling, or sometimes even before intercourse has been initiated. This supposed propensity is what gave the black widow spider, Latrodectus mactans, its name. However, the three species of North American black widows do not usually kill the male (although they have been known to do so). Males can sometimes even live in the web of a female for a period without being harmed in any way. The male Australian redback spider Latrodectus hasselti is killed by the female after he inserts his second palpus in the female genital opening; in over 60% of cases the female then eats the male.

Although the male Latrodectus hasselti may sometimes die during mating without the female actually consuming him, this species represents a possible strategy of "male sacrifice". The male redback, while copulating, "somersaults" and twists his abdomen directly onto the fangs of his mate. Approximately 65% of males are consumed at this stage. Males that "sacrifice" themselves gain the benefit of increasing their paternity relative to males who do not get cannibalized.

Despite these examples and many other similar reports, however, the theory of the "sacrificial male" has become greater than the truth. Mating of spiders is not always followed by cannibalism. Indeed, scholars have noted that the "supposed aggressiveness of the female spider towards the male is largely a myth" and that cannibalism only occurs in exceptional cases. Even so, spider cannibalism has been shown to occur in some species more than in others, mainly species belonging to Latrodectus.

There has always been speculation on why this sacrifice of male mates might occur despite the obvious disadvantage to the sacrificial males. One theory is that once the male has mated, he is unlikely to mate again and so any further extension of his life is of lesser evolutionary benefit than his indirectly contributing nutrition to the eggs. Having more offspring would give the male the advantage of having his genes passed on over other males that might avoid being eaten, which is consistent with one hypothesis that old or unfit males get eaten, whilst younger and fitter ones may survive to mate again.

== Male cannibalism of females ==
Reversing the traditional roles, species that have males consuming females are relatively unknown; the few that do show a male-biased sexual dimorphism. Examples include Allocosa brasiliensis (a wolf spider), Evarcha culicivora (a jumping spider), and the diving bell or water spider Argyroneta aquatica. Male water spiders, Argyronetia aquatica, show a predilection for mating with larger females, while cannibalizing females smaller than themselves.

In the case with Allocosa brasiliensis, males cull older females who are less fertile than their young counterparts.

== Sacrificial mothers ==
- Offspring of the species Stegodyphus lineatus exhibit matriphagy, eating their mother.
- A female of Segestria florentina will sometimes die while guarding her eggs, and the hatched spiders will later eat her.

== Non-sexual cannibalism ==
Juvenile redback spiders live in groups immediately after hatching, and are known to cannibalize siblings during this period. Cannibalism is a heritable trait in these spiders, with some families more prone to it than others.

Some spiders, such as Pholcus phalangioides, will prey on their own kind when food is scarce. Also, females of Phidippus johnsoni have been observed carrying dead males in their fangs. This behavior may be triggered by aggression, where females carry over hostility from their juvenile state and consume males just as they would prey. It has been surmised that non-reproductive cannibalism can occur due to a remnant of an aggression trait in juvenile females. Known as the "aggressive spillover hypothesis", this tendency to unselectively attack anything that moves is cultivated by a positive correlation between hostility, foraging capability, and fecundity. Aggression at a young age leads to an increase in prey consumption and as such, a larger adult size. This behavior "spills over" into adulthood, and shows up as a nonadaptive trait that manifests itself through adult females preying on males of their same species.

== See also ==
- Cannibalism (zoology)
- Sexual cannibalism
