= Henry Hearsey =

English archdeacon (1906–1982)

Ven. Henry William Moorcroft Hearsey OBE (23 September 1906 – 7 June 1982) was archdeacon of the Riviera from 1972 to 1976.

Hearsey was born in Zomba, Nyasaland (now Malawi), to Lt.-Col. Herbert Hyde Young Hearsey, the Principal Medical Officer of Nyasaland, and Maggie Marie Beales. His great uncle was Lieutenant-General Sir John Bennet Hearsey. He was educated at Pembroke College, Oxford and ordained in 1935. After curacies in West Southbourne and Bournemouth, he was a Chaplain to the Forces from 1940 to 1949: he was mentioned in despatches in 1945. After that he served in Vienna, Gibraltar, Nice and Cannes.

He was appointed an Officer of the Order of the British Empire (OBE) in the 1964 New Year Honours.

Hearsey died at the Anglo-American Hospital in Cannes and donated his body for scientific research.
