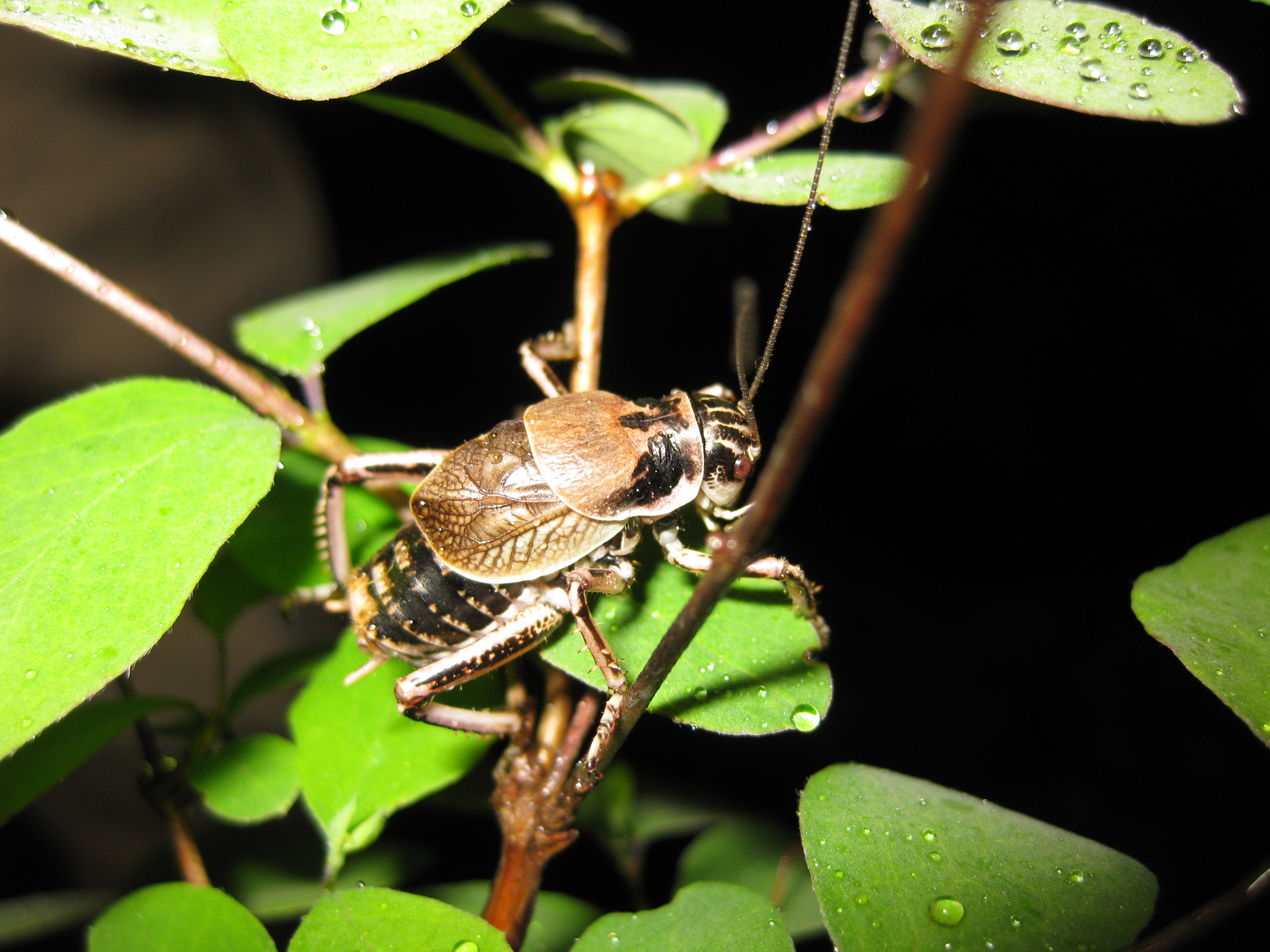
- Cyphoderris buckelli
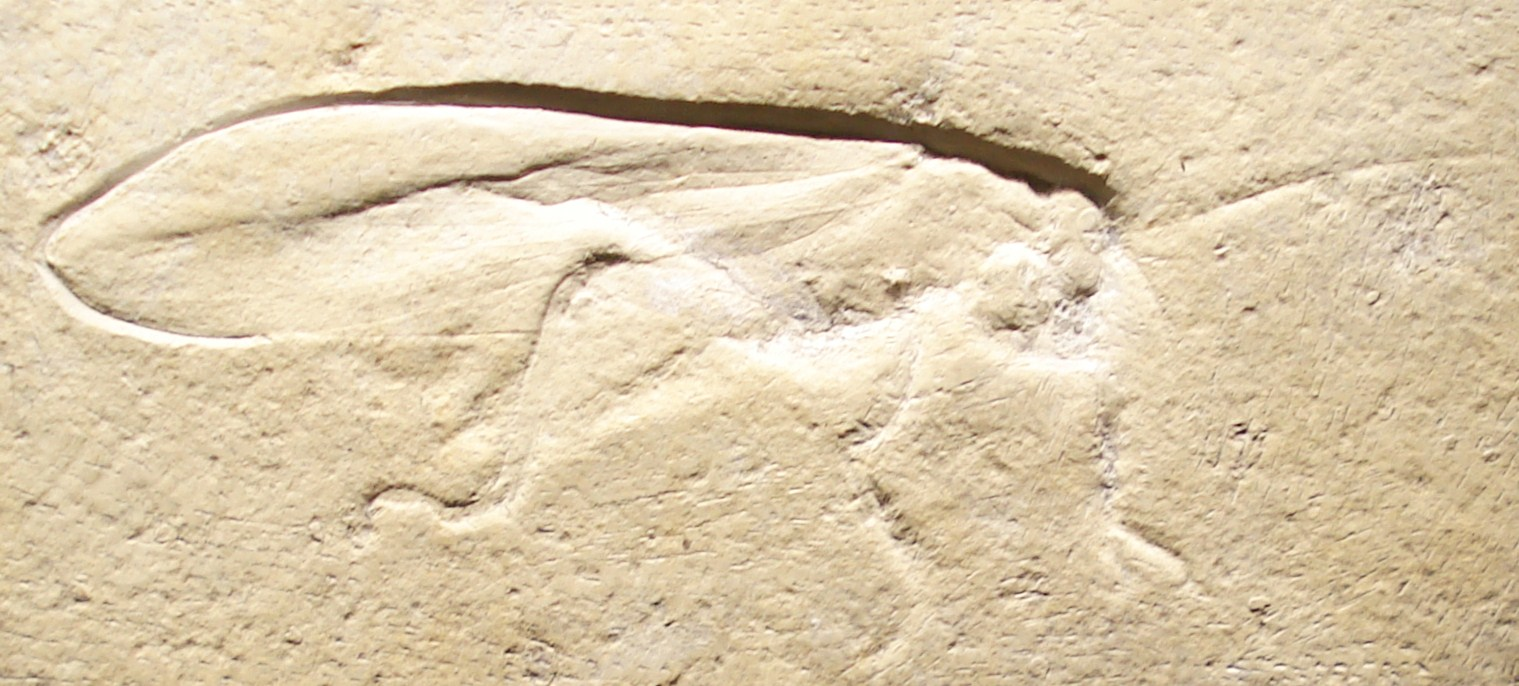
- Pycnophlebia speciosa, a Jurassic species

Scientific classification
- Kingdom: Animalia
- Phylum: Arthropoda
- Clade: Pancrustacea
- Class: Insecta
- Order: Orthoptera
- Suborder: Ensifera
- Superfamily: Hagloidea
- Family: Prophalangopsidae; Kirby, 1906

Genera
- Extant genera: Aboilomimus; Cyphoderris; Paracyphoderris; Prophalangopsis; Tarragoilus

= Prophalangopsidae =

Prophalangopsidae Temporal range: Early Jurassic – Present

Family of cricket-like animals

The family Prophalangopsidae are insects belonging to the order Orthoptera. They are the only extant members of the superfamily Hagloidea. There is only one extant genus in North America, where they are known as grigs, four genera in Asia, and many extinct genera (see below).

The earliest fossils of the family date to the Early Jurassic around 200 million years ago, and the family exhibited great diversity between the Middle Jurassic and the Early Cretaceous, with their fossil record after that time being sparse.

The closest living relatives to the Prophalangopsidae are the family Tettigoniidae (katydids or bush-crickets), but the evolutionary split occurred more than 230 million years ago in the Permian.

The female of the species consumes the wings of the male during mating.

Haglidae is often used as a synonym of the family, but is used to refer to a distinct grouping of extinct hagloids by paleontologists.

== Subfamilies and genera ==
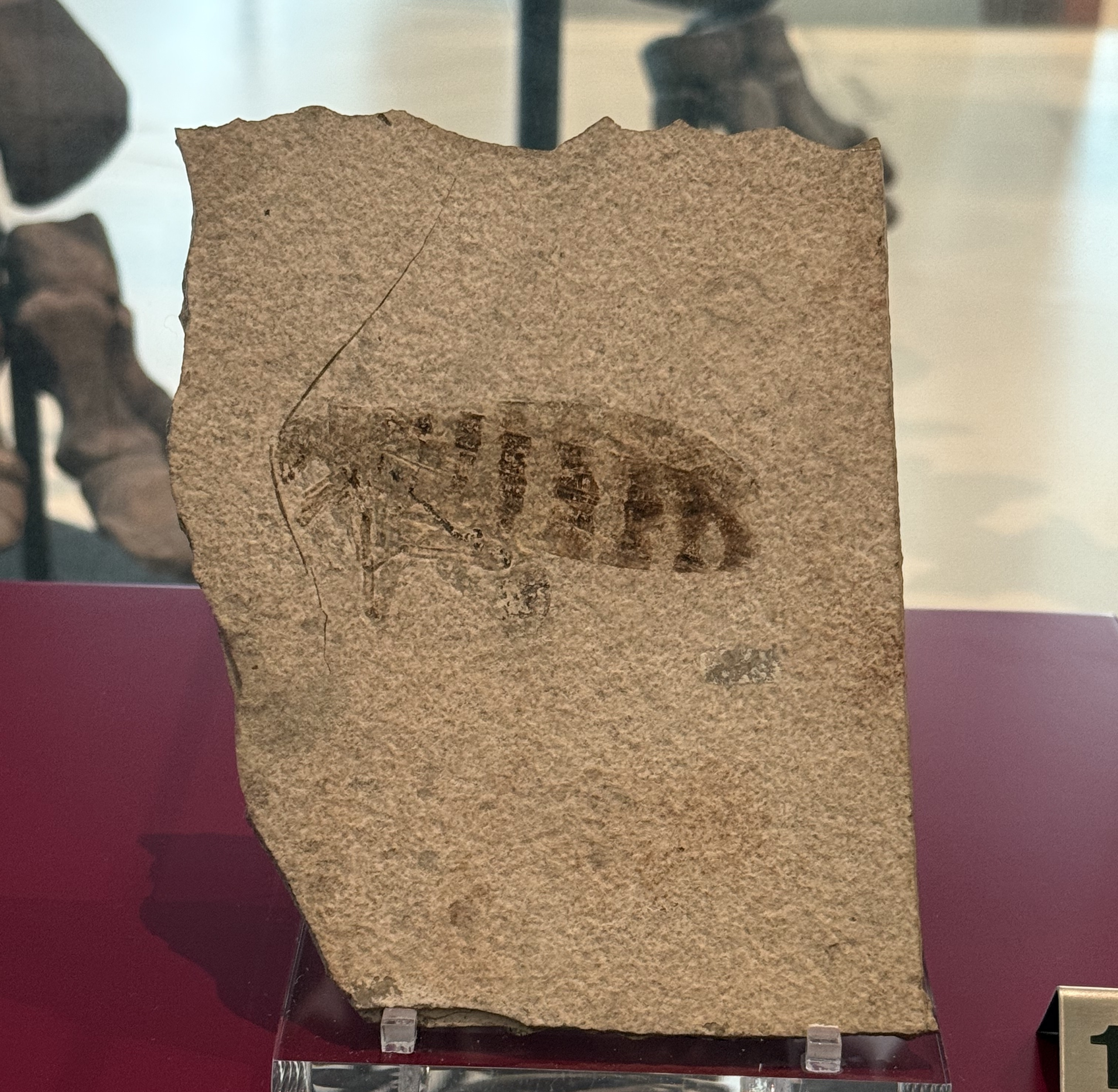
†Aboilus aulietus, Kazakhstan (Late Jurassic)

The Orthoptera Species File lists the following: Archibald, Gu, and Mathewes (2022) removed the genera †Albertoilus and †Palaeorehnia from the family, moving them to a revised †Palaeorehniidae which they considered unplaced as to superfamily.

- Cyphoderrinae Gorochov 1988
  - Cyphoderris Uhler, 1864 (NW America)
  - Paracyphoderris Storozhenko, 1980 (Siberia)
- Prophalangopsinae Kirby, 1906
  - Aboilomimus Gorochov, 2001 (China)
  - Prophalangopsis Walker, 1871 (Indian subcontinent)
  - Tarragoilus Gorochov, 2001 (China)
  - †Jurassobatea Zeuner, 1937 Solnhofen Limestone, Germany, Late Jurassic (Tithonian)
  - †Mesoprophalangopsis Hong, 1986 Haifanggou Formation, China, Middle Jurassic (Callovian)
  - †Zalmonites Handlirsch, 1906 Green Series, Germany, Early Jurassic (Toarcian)
- †Aboilinae Martynov 1925
  - †Aboilus Martynov, 1925 Badaowan Formation, China, Early Jurassic (Sinemurian) Kyzyl-Kiya, Kyrgyzstan, Early Jurassic (Pliensbachian), Huajiaozi, China, Early Jurassic (Toarcian), Iya, Russia, Early Jurassic, Ma'ao Formation, Daohugou Beds, China, Middle Jurassic, Karabastau Formation, Kazakhstan, Late Jurassic, Talynzhan Formation, Russia, Late Jurassic, Yixian Formation, China, Early Cretaceous (Barremian-Aptian)
  - †Allaboilus Ren & Meng, 2006 Daohugou Beds, China, Middle Jurassic, Yixian Formation, China, Early Cretaceous (Barremian-Aptian)
  - †Angustaboilus Li, Ren & Meng, 2007 Daohugou Beds, China, Middle Jurassic
  - †Apsataboilus Gorochov, 1990 Apsat, Russia, Early Cretaceous
  - †Bacharaboilus Gorochov, 1988 Daohugou Beds, China, Bahar, Mongolia, Middle Jurassic
  - †Baissaboilus Gorochov, 1996 Zaza Formation, Russia, Early Cretaceous
  - †Brunneus Hong, 1983 Haifanggou Formation, China, Middle Jurassic
  - †Circulaboilus Li, Ren & Wang, 2007 Daohugou Beds, China, Middle Jurassic
  - †Flexaboilus Li, Ren & Meng, 2007
  - †Furcaboilus Li, Ren & Wang, 2007
  - †Karatailus Gorochov, 1996 Karabastau Formation, Kazakhstan, Late Jurassic
  - †Notohagla Johns, 1996 Puti Siltstone, New Zealand, Late Jurassic
  - †Novaboilus Li, Ren & Meng, 2007 Daohugou Beds, China, Middle Jurassic
  - †Pamphagopsis Martynov, 1925 Sulyukta Formation, Kyrgyzstan, Early Jurassic (Toarcian), Karabastau Formation, Kazakhstan, Late Jurassic
  - †Procyrtophyllites Zeuner, 1935 Purbeck Group, United Kingdom, Early Cretaceous (Berriasian)
  - †Prophalangopseides Sharov, 1968 Zaza Formation, Russia, Early Cretaceous
  - †Pseudohagla Sharov, 1962 Osinov Formation, Russia, Early Jurassic (Toarcian), Daohugou Beds, China, Middle Jurassic
  - †Pycnophlebia Deichmuller, 1886 Haifanggou Formation, China, Middle Jurassic, Solnhofen Limestone, Germany, Late Jurassic (Tithonian)
  - †Sigmaboilus Fang, Zhang, Wang & Zhang, 2007 Daohugou Beds, China, Middle Jurassic
  - †Sunoprophalangopsis Hong, 1982 Jiulongshan Formation, China, Middle Jurassic (Callovian)
  - †Tettaboilus Gorochov, 1988 Zaza Formation, Russia, Early Cretaceous
  - †Utanaboilus Gorochov, 1990 Zaza Formation, Kuenga, Russia, Early Cretaceous
- †Chifengiinae Hong, 1982
  - †Aenigmoilus Gorochov, Jarzembowski & Coram, 2006 Weald Clay Formation, United Kingdom, Early Cretaceous (Hauterivian)
  - †Aethehagla Meng & Ren, 2006 Yixian Formation, China, Early Cretaceous (Barremian-Aptian)
  - †Ashanga Zherikhin, 1985 Uda Formation, Russia, Upper Jurassic, Yixian Formation, China, Early Cretaceous (Barremian-Aptian) Zhonggou Formation, China, Early Cretaceous (Albian)
  - †Ashangopsis Lin, Huang & Nel, 2008 Daohugou Beds, China, Middle Jurassic
  - †Chifengia Hong, 1982 Haifanggou Formation, China, Middle Jurassic, Yixian Formation, China, Early Cretaceous (Barremian-Aptian)
  - †Grammohagla Meng & Ren, 2006
  - †Habrohagla Ren, Lu, Guo & Ji, 1995
  - †Hebeihagla Hong, 1982
  - †Parahagla Sharov, 1968 Zaza Formation, Russia, Early Cretaceous, Chijinbao Formation, Yixian Formation, China, Early Cretaceous (Barremian-Aptian)
- †Protaboilinae Gorochov 1995
  - †Protaboilus Gorochov, 1988 Kyzyl-Kiya, Kyrgyzstan, Early Jurassic (Pliensbachian), Daohugou Beds, China, Middle Jurassic
- †Termitidiinae Zeuner 1939
  - †Agrionidium Westwood, 1854 Purbeck Group, United Kingdom, Early Cretaceous (Berriasian)
  - †Mesogryllus Handlirsch, 1906 Lulworth Formation, United Kingdom, Early Cretaceous (Berriasian)
  - †Pseudaboilus Gorochov, Jarzembowski & Coram, 2006 Purbeck Group, United Kingdom, Early Cretaceous (Berriasian), China, Early Cretaceous (Barremian-Aptian)
  - †Termitidium Westwood, 1854 Durlston Formation, United Kingdom, Early Cretaceous (Berriasian)
  - †Tettigoilus Gorochov, Jarzembowski & Coram, 2006 Weald Clay Formation, United Kingdom, Early Cretaceous (Hauterivian)
  - †Zalmona Giebel, 1856 Purbeck Group, United Kingdom, Early Cretaceous (Berriasian)
- †Tettohaglinae Gorochov, 2011
  - †Tettohagla Gorochov, 1996 Zaza Formation, Russia, Early Cretaceous
- undetermined subfamily:
  - †Cratohaglopsis Martins-Neto, 1991 Crato Formation, Brazil, Early Cretaceous (Aptian)
  - †Grylloprophalangopsis Zhang, 2026 Nenjiang Formation, China, Late Cretaceous (Santonian-Campanian)
  - †Kevania Martins-Neto, 1991 Crato Formation, Brazil, Early Cretaceous (Aptian)
  - †Sinoprophalangopsis Hong, 1983 Jiulongshan Formation, China, Middle Jurassic (Callovian)
