= Caledomedes =

Scientific classification
- Kingdom: Animalia
- Phylum: Arthropoda
- Subphylum: Chelicerata
- Class: Arachnida
- Order: Araneae
- Infraorder: Araneomorphae
- Family: Dolomedidae
- Genus: Caledomedes; Raven & Hebron, 2018
- Species: C. flavovittatus

Binomial name
- Caledomedes flavovittatus (Simon, 1880)

Synonyms
- Anoteropsis flavovittata Simon, 1880

Genus of spiders

Caledomedes is a monotypic genus of spiders in the family Dolomedidae containing only the species Caledomedes flavovittatus. It is endemic to New Caledonia.

== Taxonomy ==
The genus Caledomedes was established by Robert Raven and Wendy Hebron in 2018 as part of a comprehensive review of the water spider family Pisauridae (now recognized as part of Dolomedidae) in Australia and New Caledonia. The type species, originally described as Anoteropsis flavovittata by Eugène Simon in 1880, had a complex taxonomic history before finding its current placement.

Simon originally placed the species in the genus Anoteropsis within the Pisauridae alongside the type species Anoteropsis flavescens. The species remained in Pisauridae until Raymond Forster in 1979 recognized that the type species of Anoteropsis was actually a member of Lycosidae. Later, Cor Vink in 2002 determined that Simon's A. flavovittata was misplaced in Lycosidae and belonged elsewhere.

=== Etymology ===
The genus name Caledomedes is formed from "New Caledonia", referring to the endemic distribution of the spiders, combined with "Dolomedes", a related genus in the family. The species name is a combination of Latin flavus and vittatus, meaning "yellow-banded".

== Distribution ==
Caledomedes is widespread in rainforests throughout New Caledonia.

== Habitat ==
Caledomedes flavovittatus is a nocturnal spider that hunts freely on the ground and vegetation in rainforest environments. Unlike many related genera, males and females are of similar size.

== Description ==
Caledomedes can be distinguished from other related genera by several diagnostic features. The anterior eye row is only as wide as or narrower than the width of the second row, and the anterior median eyes are much smaller than the posterior median eyes and positioned on tubercles that overhang the clypeus. The anterior eye row is approximately 0.7 times the width of the posterior eye row.

The carapace in lateral view is low posteriorly with a medial saddle rising toward the eye region. The chelicerae have one small and two large teeth on the promargin and 4-5 teeth on the retromargin.

Males differ from those of other related genera in having a deeply divided and proximal retrolateral tibial apophysis combined with a long slender cymbium and embolus, with the fulcrum extending along the length of the cymbium. The male palp follows the basic Dolomedes ground plan but with distinctive modifications.

Females have an epigyne with an overall ovoid shape that is clearly wider than long, with curved lateral lobes that widen distally and a median field occupying the full length.

The opisthosoma is yellow-brown with two large white spots posteriorly and lacks a ventral pattern.

== Relationships ==
The very long basal retrolateral tibial apophysis of the male palp shows affinities with the genus Mangromedes. The elongate cymbium, embolus and fulcrum also occur in related genera Megadolomedes and Tasmomedes.
