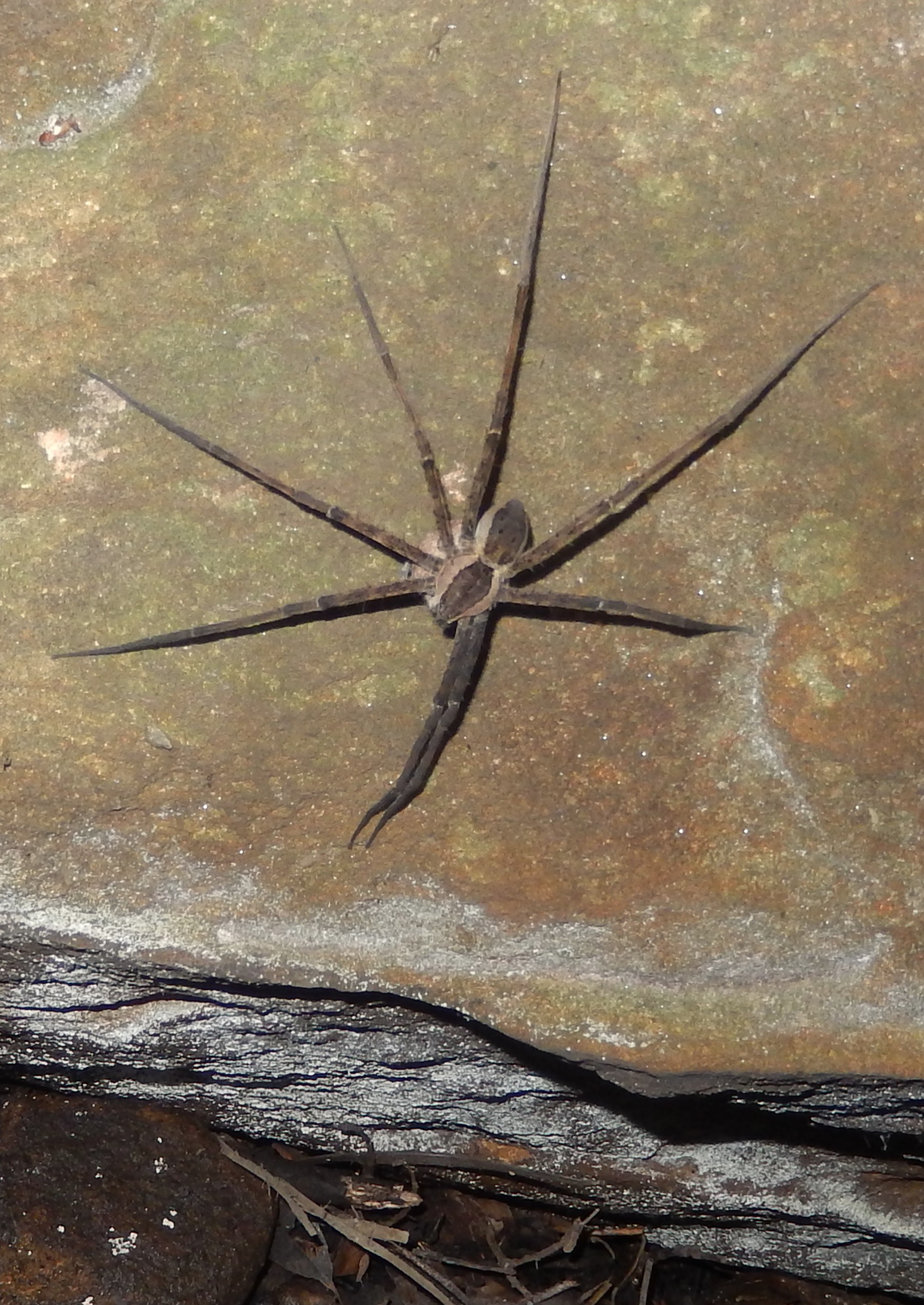
- Female from Chatswood, New South Wales

Scientific classification
- Kingdom: Animalia
- Phylum: Arthropoda
- Subphylum: Chelicerata
- Class: Arachnida
- Order: Araneae
- Infraorder: Araneomorphae
- Family: Dolomedidae
- Genus: Megadolomedes
- Species: M. australianus

Binomial name
- Megadolomedes australianus (L. Koch, 1865)

Synonyms
- Dolomedes australianus L. Koch, 1865; Dolomedes cervinus L. Koch, 1876

= Megadolomedes australianus =

Species of spider

Megadolomedes australianus is a species of spider endemic to Australia in the family Dolomedidae. It was first described by Ludwig Carl Christian Koch in 1865. This species is the type species of the genus Megadolomedes.

== Taxonomy ==
The species was originally placed in the genus Dolomedes by L. Koch in 1865. Koch also described Dolomedes cervinus in 1876, which is now considered a synonym of M. australianus. The species was transferred to the newly established genus Megadolomedes by Davies and Raven in 1980.

== Description ==
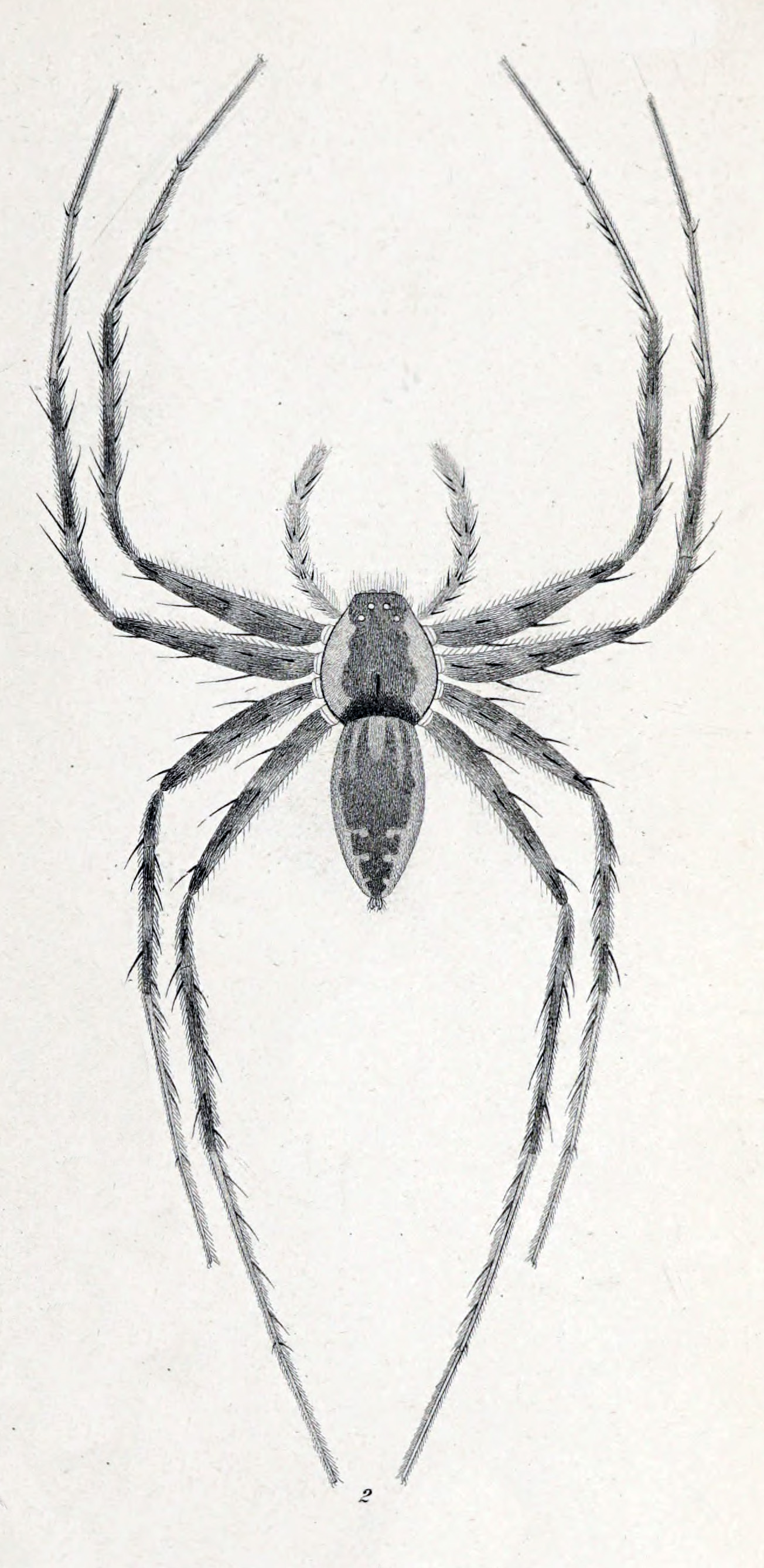
female M. australianus from L. Koch 1876

Megadolomedes australianus is a large water spider. Females have a total body length of around 31.9 mm (1.26 in), with the carapace measuring up to 13.68 mm long and 12.87 mm wide, and the opisthosoma reaching 18.22 mm long and 12.15 mm wide. Males are considerably smaller, with carapace length around 6.00 mm and width 4.96 mm.

The eye arrangement shows the typical pattern for the family, with the eye group width through the posterior lateral eyes being about 0.64 times the head width in males and 0.54 in females. The chelicerae bear two teeth on the promargin and four separated teeth on the retromargin in both sexes.

Males can be distinguished from those of the closely related Megadolomedes trux and M. johndouglasi by their short barrel-shaped palpal tibia and broad, thumb-like dorsal tibial process. The palpal bulb features a large, racket-shaped conductor that is distally sinuous beside the embolus, and the embolus base is roughly conical with no processes or spines.

Females differ from those of M. johndouglasi in their distinctive abdominal pattern and relatively broader epigyne, as well as the thread-like overlying spermathecal coils.They can be distinguished from female M. trux by their transversely aligned spermathecae, which occupy relatively less of the epigyne. The epigyne features broad, smoothly curving lateral lobes and a median field in the distal third, while the vulva has a large posterior lobe and successively smaller anterior lobes overlain with three loops of filamentous ducts.

== Distribution ==
M. australianus is endemic to New South Wales, Australia. Its known range extends from the Nepean River area north of Sydney south to at least Wollongong. Specimens have been collected from various locations including Budderoo National Park, Enfield State Forest, and the Colo River region.

== Habitat ==
The species has been found in rainforest environments, including near waterfalls and in gorges, consistent with its water spider ecology.
