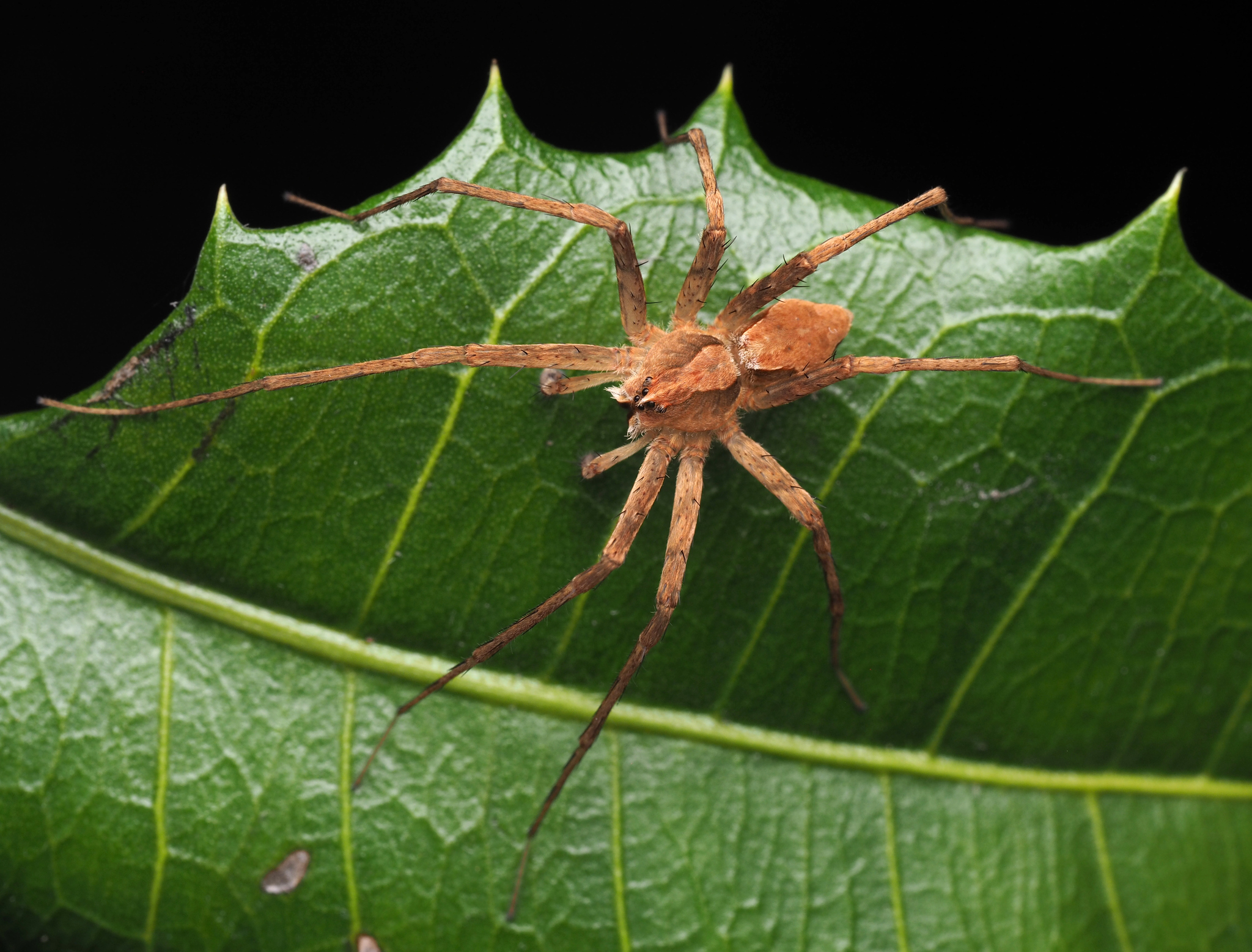
- O. benrevelli from Great Sandy National Park

Scientific classification
- Kingdom: Animalia
- Phylum: Arthropoda
- Subphylum: Chelicerata
- Class: Arachnida
- Order: Araneae
- Infraorder: Araneomorphae
- Family: Dolomedidae
- Genus: Ornodolomedes
- Species: O. benrevelli

Binomial name
- Ornodolomedes benrevelli Raven & Hebron, 2018

= Ornodolomedes benrevelli =

Species of spider

Ornodolomedes benrevelli, commonly known as the masked wood sprite, is a species of spider in the family Dolomedidae. It is endemic to Queensland, Australia.

== Etymology ==
The species epithet benrevelli honours the collector and photographer Ben Revell from Brisbane, in recognition of his efforts as a "citizen scientist" for "collecting a species that had remained undiscovered despite numerous day and night arachnological expeditions to the area".

== Taxonomy ==
O. benrevelli was originally described as part of the family Pisauridae in 2018, and was designated as the type species of the genus Ornodolomedes. In 2025, the genus Ornodolomedes was transferred to the family Dolomedidae based on molecular phylogenetic studies.

== Distribution ==
O. benrevelli is known only from rainforest at Mount Glorious in south-eastern Queensland. Additional photographic records suggest the species may also occur at Nightcap Range in north-eastern New South Wales and Mount Tamborine in south-east Queensland.

== Habitat ==
The spiders are found in rainforest environments where they hunt on green leaves of low plants during the night. They are arboreal, dwelling on bark and leaves as typical for members of the genus Ornodolomedes.

== Description ==
Both genders are easily distinguished from other related spiders by their distinctive bold brown, black and pale markings on the carapace and opisthosoma.

Females are slightly larger than males, reaching about 7.8 mm in total length. They share similar coloration patterns to males but with more strongly defined bands on the posterior corners of the carapace. The opisthosoma is laterally dark with a well-defined pale underside.

Males have a carapace that is yellow-brown with fine black hairs, featuring a burgundy central area around the eyes and two black patches on the posterior corners. The opisthosoma shows a strong constriction at two-thirds of its length with fawn brown flanks. The chelicerae display a distinctive dark inverted V pattern. Males measure approximately 7.2 mm in total length.

The male pedipalp resembles that of the closely related Ornodolomedes mickfanningi but differs in having a more basal retrolateral tibial apophysis, a cymbium only slightly longer than the tibia, and a broader dorsal tegular process. The female epigyne is distinctly longer than wide with slender, widely spaced and diagonal spermathecal ducts.
