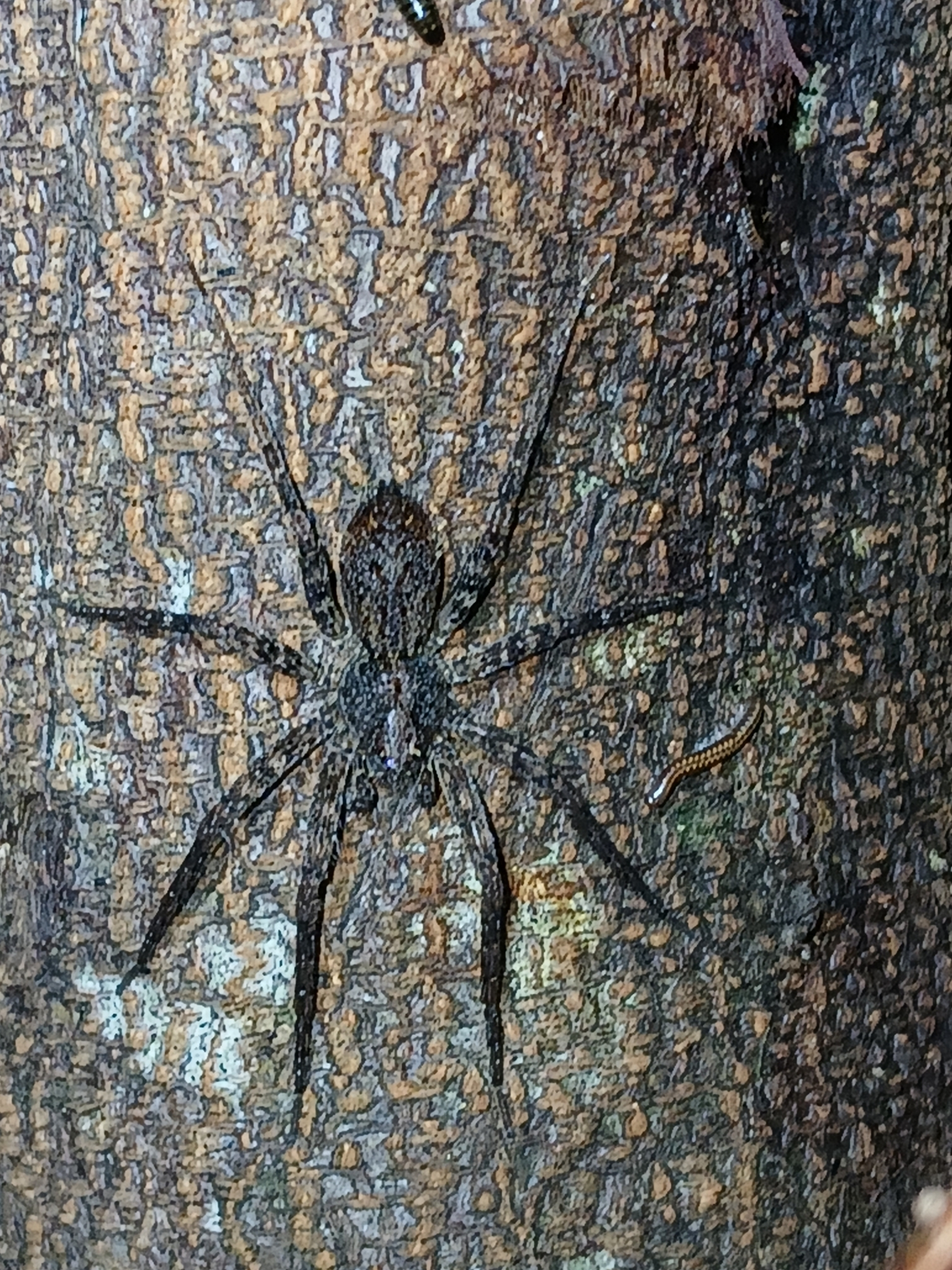
- O. nicholsoni from Walpole
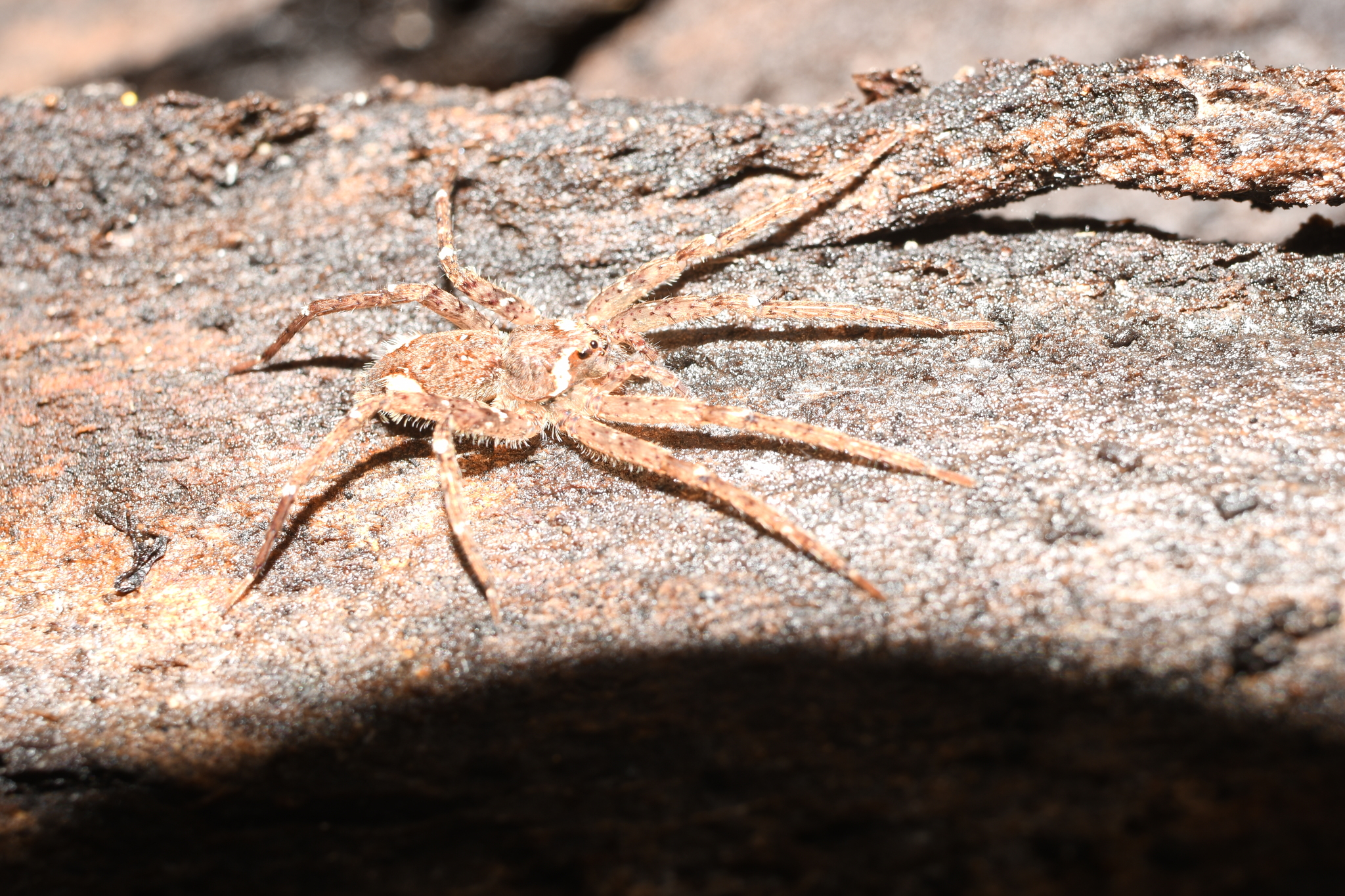
- from Walpole

Scientific classification
- Kingdom: Animalia
- Phylum: Arthropoda
- Subphylum: Chelicerata
- Class: Arachnida
- Order: Araneae
- Infraorder: Araneomorphae
- Family: Dolomedidae
- Genus: Ornodolomedes
- Species: O. nicholsoni

Binomial name
- Ornodolomedes nicholsoni Raven & Hebron, 2018

= Ornodolomedes nicholsoni =

Species of spider

Ornodolomedes nicholsoni is a species of spider in the family Dolomedidae. It is endemic to Western Australia.

== Etymology ==
The species epithet is in honour of Jack Nicholson, an actor who "so brilliantly portrays diverse personalities".

== Distribution ==
O. nicholsoni is known only from Two Peoples Bay Nature Reserve and Glenbourne, south of Gracetown, in south-western Western Australia.

== Habitat ==
The species has been collected from Karri forest and valley bottoms using pitfall traps.

== Description ==
Males have a carapace length of approximately 5.0 mm and total body length of about 10.0 mm. The carapace is yellow-brown with light pile of darker hairs and no evident pattern. The opisthosoma is laterally mottled and dark with a medial foliate pallid zone that is generally coffin-shaped.

Females are slightly larger, with a carapace length of approximately 5.2 mm and total body length of about 12.0 mm. The carapace is yellowish with white hairs on the head region and black hairs beside it. The abdomen is pentagonal with two dark anterior shoulders and tufts of white hair posteriorly and laterally.

Males can be distinguished from the geographically closest species O. southcotti by their longer palpal tibia (approximately 1.2 times longer than cymbium), long simple conical retrolateral tibial apophysis, and straight, almost triangular dorsal tegular process. They are most similar to males of O. mickfanningi but differ in having a relatively much smaller median apophysis.

Females are unique within the genus in having a trianguloid form of the median field in the epigyne and the rectanguloid shape of the internal ducts.
