= Megadolomedes nord =

Scientific classification
- Kingdom: Animalia
- Phylum: Arthropoda
- Subphylum: Chelicerata
- Class: Arachnida
- Order: Araneae
- Infraorder: Araneomorphae
- Family: Dolomedidae
- Genus: Megadolomedes
- Species: M. nord

Binomial name
- Megadolomedes nord Raven & Hebron, 2018

Species of spider

Megadolomedes nord is a species of spider in the family Dolomedidae (formerly Pisauridae). It is endemic to northern Australia.

== Etymology ==
The species epithet nord is a noun in apposition from the French word for north.

== Distribution ==
M. nord is known only from the Iron Range area in Cape York Peninsula, at the northern tip of Queensland, Australia.

== Description ==
Megadolomedes nord is a relatively large spider. The female holotype has a cephalothorax length of 8.83 mm and width of 8.00 mm, with an opisthosoma length of 10.33 mm and width of 6.17 mm, giving a total body length of 19.2 mm.

Females can be distinguished from the closely related Megadolomedes trux by their relatively long epigyne and the shape of the spermathecae lobes, which are similar in size or enlarge anteriorly.

The chelicerae have two teeth on the front margin and four separated teeth on the rear margin. The eyes are arranged in the typical pisaurid pattern, with the eye group occupying 48% of the head width.
