= Mangromedes porosus =

Scientific classification
- Kingdom: Animalia
- Phylum: Arthropoda
- Subphylum: Chelicerata
- Class: Arachnida
- Order: Araneae
- Infraorder: Araneomorphae
- Family: Dolomedidae
- Genus: Mangromedes
- Species: M. porosus

Binomial name
- Mangromedes porosus Raven & Hebron, 2018

Species of spider

Mangromedes porosus is a species of spider in the family Dolomedidae (formerly Pisauridae). It is endemic to the Northern Territory of Australia.

== Etymology ==
The species epithet porosus is derived from the species name of the saltwater crocodile (Crocodylus porosus Schneider, 1801), which are very common in the mangroves where this spider occurs in the Northern Territory.

== Taxonomy ==
The species was described in 2018 by Robert Raven and Wendy Hebron as part of their comprehensive review of the water spider family Pisauridae in Australia and New Caledonia.

== Distribution ==
M. porosus is known only from mangroves at Point Farewell, Kakadu National Park and the nearby East Alligator River in the Northern Territory.

== Habitat ==
This species inhabits mangrove environments, which aligns with the habitat preferences of the genus Mangromedes, as suggested by its name.

== Description ==
Mangromedes porosus is a medium-sized spider with males having a carapace length of approximately 3.0 mm and females slightly larger at 3.7 mm. Males can be distinguished from the related Mangromedes kochi by the more distal position of the retrolateral tibial apophysis (RTA) on the male pedipalp. Females differ from M. kochi in having less extensive epigynal "wings".

The cephalothorax is light brown with darker margins, while the opisthosoma is roughly pentagonal with pallid regions flanked by dark mottling. The legs are slightly paler than the carapace, with the femora showing darker mottling patterns.

Male pedipalps are diagnostic for the species, with the tibia being about 0.5 times the length of the cymbium, and featuring a deeply divided RTA set in the distal third. The embolus terminates near the median apophysis on the prolateral edge.
