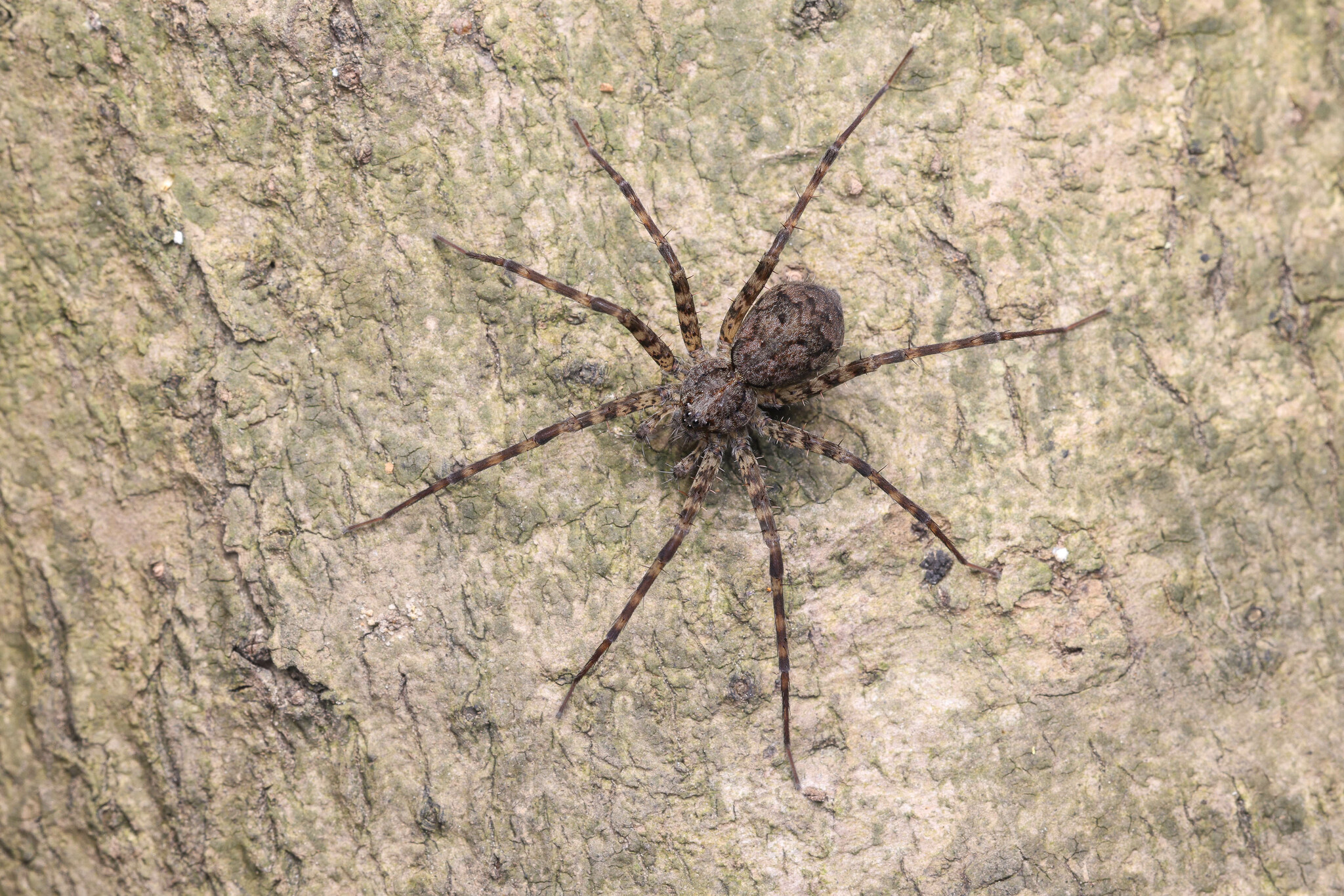
- M. kochi from Brisbane

Scientific classification
- Kingdom: Animalia
- Phylum: Arthropoda
- Subphylum: Chelicerata
- Class: Arachnida
- Order: Araneae
- Infraorder: Araneomorphae
- Family: Dolomedidae
- Genus: Mangromedes
- Species: M. kochi

Binomial name
- Mangromedes kochi (Roewer, 1951)

Synonyms
- Dolomedes elegans L. Koch, 1876; Nilus elegans (Simon, 1898); Nilus kochi Roewer, 1951

= Mangromedes kochi =

Species of spider

Mangromedes kochi is a species of spider in the family Pisauridae (nursery web spiders). It is endemic to Queensland, Australia, where it inhabits coastal mangrove ecosystems.

== Taxonomy ==
The species was first described by Ludwig Carl Christian Koch in 1876 as Dolomedes elegans, but this name was preoccupied by Dolomedes elegans Taczanowski, 1874. Eugène Simon transferred the species to the genus Nilus in 1898. Carl Friedrich Roewer provided the replacement name Nilus kochi in 1951 to resolve the homonymy. In 2018, Robert Raven and Wendy Hebron transferred the species to the newly established genus Mangromedes based on morphological characteristics.

== Description ==
Mangromedes kochi is a medium-sized spider. Males have a carapace length of approximately 3.1 mm and total body length of 5.7 mm, while females are larger with a carapace length of about 3.6 mm and total body length of 7.6 mm.

The carapace is orange-brown with black edges and a darker central zone. The legs are orange-brown without distinct banding patterns. In females, the opisthosoma is dark and mottled with darker anterior lateral shoulders.

Males can be distinguished from the closely related Mangromedes porosus by the more proximal position of the retrolateral tibial apophysis on the pedipalp. Females have characteristically wide epigynal "wings" that extend laterally from the main epigyne.

The species has the typical pisaurid eye arrangement with eight eyes in two rows. The posterior median eyes possess a grate-shaped tapetum, which gives them a pale appearance.

== Distribution and habitat ==
Mangromedes kochi is found along the Queensland coast from Ingham in the north to Moreton Bay in the south. The species is specifically adapted to mangrove and saltmarsh environments, particularly areas with saltwater couch grass (Sporobolus virginicus).

== Ecology and behavior ==
This species is a semi-aquatic hunter that demonstrates remarkable adaptation to tidal environments. The spiders are most active at night and exhibit sophisticated tidal behavior, running up mangrove trunks as the tide rises over mudflats. During low tide, they can be found positioned low on mangrove trunks and among aerial roots.

Population densities can be quite high, with surveys recording up to 50 individuals per square meter on logs and trunks, though densities of 6-10 per square meter are more typical throughout the aerial root systems. The spiders are exceptionally fast-moving and retreat into cavities within tree roots when disturbed.

Notably, M. kochi demonstrates a specialized ability to hunt on the water surface in its natural mangrove habitat, but loses this capability in freshwater, suggesting an adaptation to the specific surface tension properties of brackish mangrove water.

== Reproduction ==
Both males and females are found in mangroves from May through September. Females carry small egg sacs in their chelicerae during August and September. The egg sacs are relatively small and contain few eggs compared to other pisaurid species.
