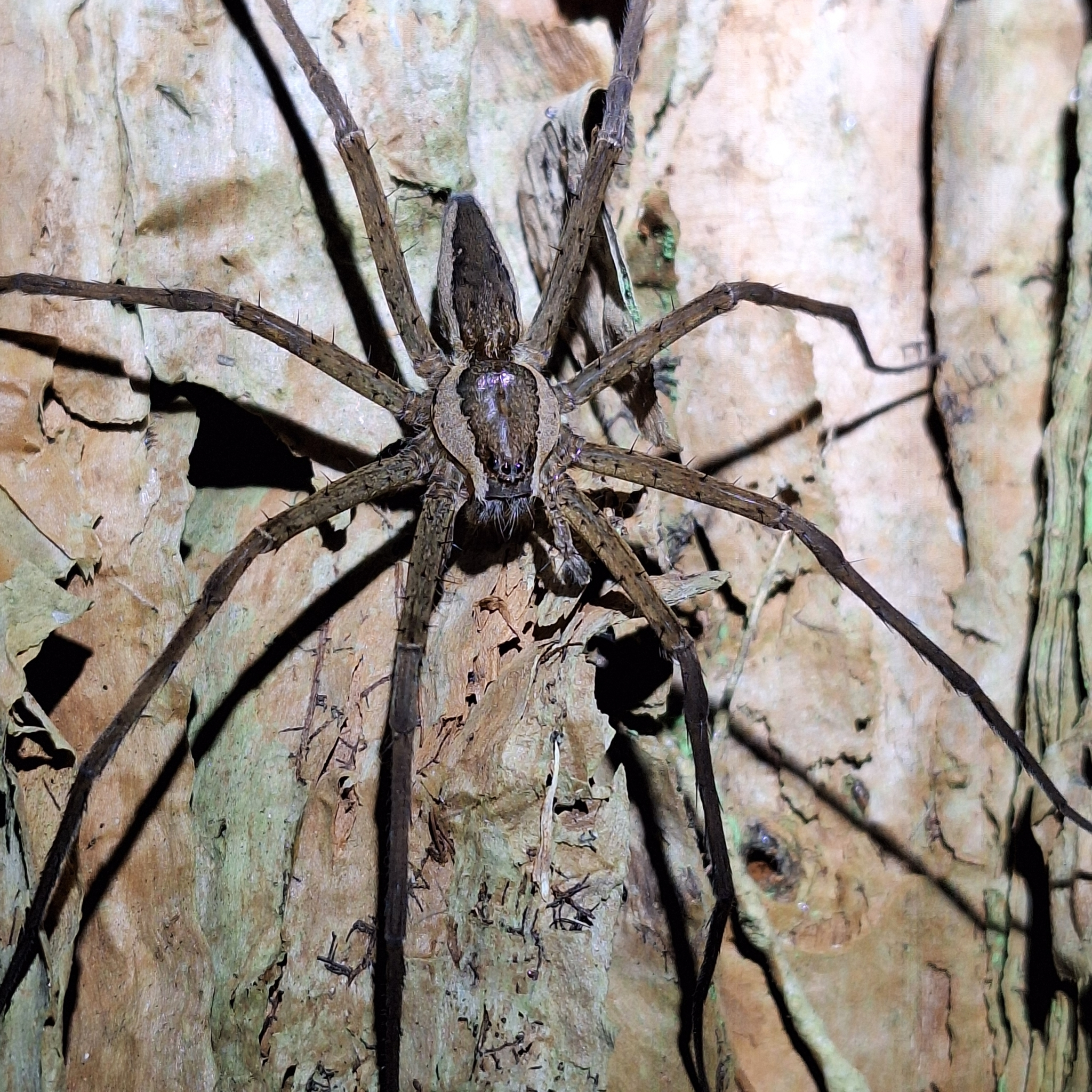
- Female from Queensland, Australia

Scientific classification
- Kingdom: Animalia
- Phylum: Arthropoda
- Subphylum: Chelicerata
- Class: Arachnida
- Order: Araneae
- Infraorder: Araneomorphae
- Family: Dolomedidae
- Genus: Megadolomedes
- Species: M. trux

Binomial name
- Megadolomedes trux (Lamb, 1911)

Synonyms
- Dolomedes trux Lamb, 1911

= Megadolomedes trux =

Species of spider

Megadolomedes trux is a species of spider endemic to Australia in the family Dolomedidae.

== Taxonomy ==
Dolomedes trux was first described by J. Lamb in 1911 from a female type specimen collected at Ithaca Creek, Brisbane. A 1980 revision of the Dolomedes australianus species group by Valerie Todd Davies and Robert J. Raven concluded that D. trux was conspecific with D. australianus and synonymised the two under the name Megadolomedes australianus; however, a 2018 review of the family Pisauridae by Raven and Wendy Hebron would restore D. trux to species status, placing it in the genus Megadolomedes as Megadolomodes trux. The type specimen is now housed in the collection of the Queensland Museum.

== Description ==
Like many spiders, M. trux displays strong sexual size dimorphism. Females have a total body length of around 30 mm (1.2 in), while the total body length of males is around 7.6 mm (0.30 in). It is one of Australia's largest spiders. They have a brown, earth-coloured abdomen and long, pseudosegmented tarsi. The species superficially resembles the American genus Trechalea.

== Distribution ==
M. trux is found east of the Great Dividing Range in New South Wales and Queensland. Their distribution ranges from Gordon in the south to Cooktown in the north.

== Behaviour ==
In its original description, this species was recorded preying on an adult tree frog.

M. trux hunts from beneath rocks and logs on the edges of slow-moving waterways, where they wait for prey to pass by with their front legs outstretched. The long, sensitive trichobothria on the front legs of this species allow them to detect vibrations in the water from small fish and frogs. Upon detecting a suitable prey item in this manner, the spider dives into the water to subdue it, remaining in the substrate for up to 30 minutes.

Like other species in Dolomedidae, females carry eggsacs in their chelicerae.
