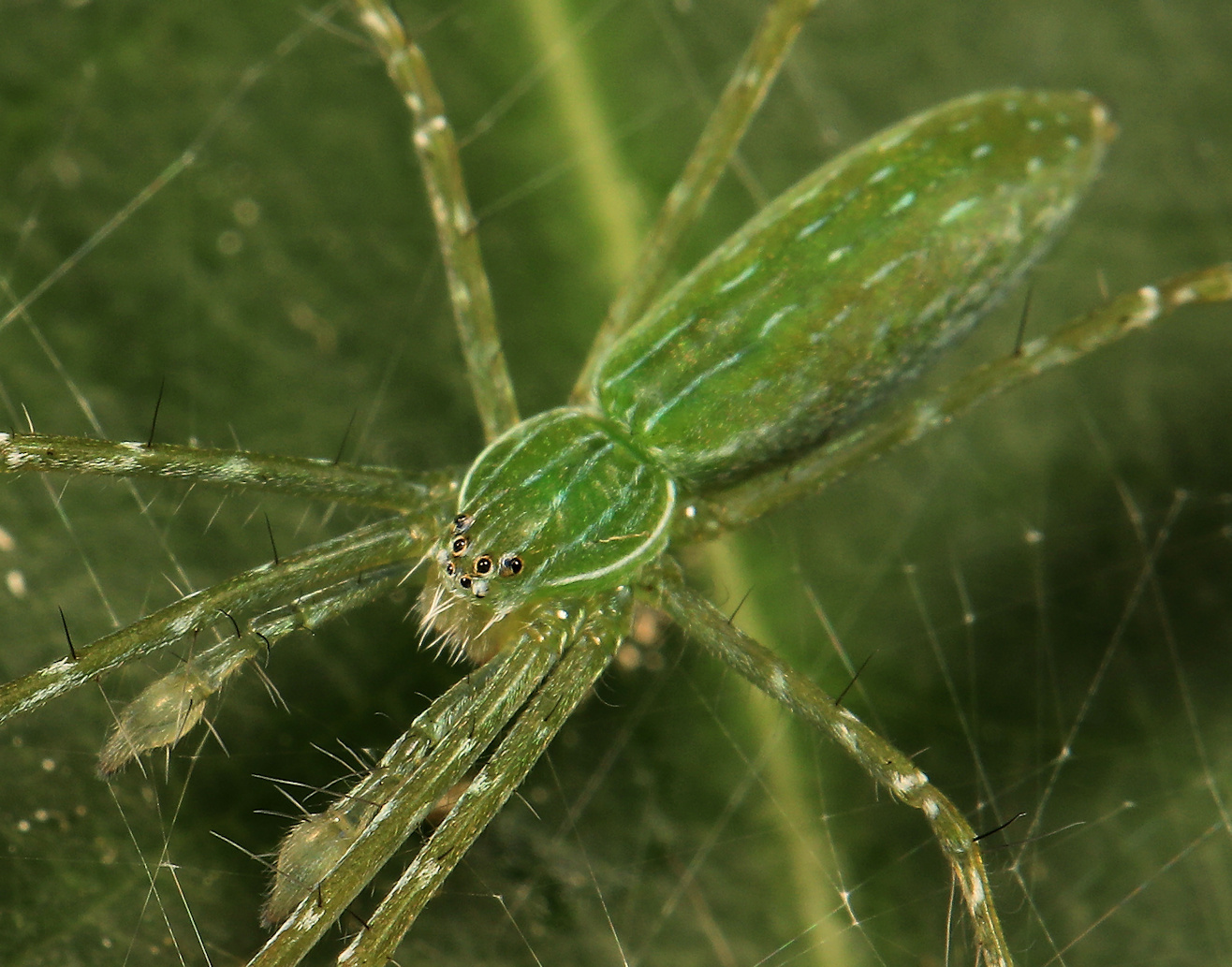

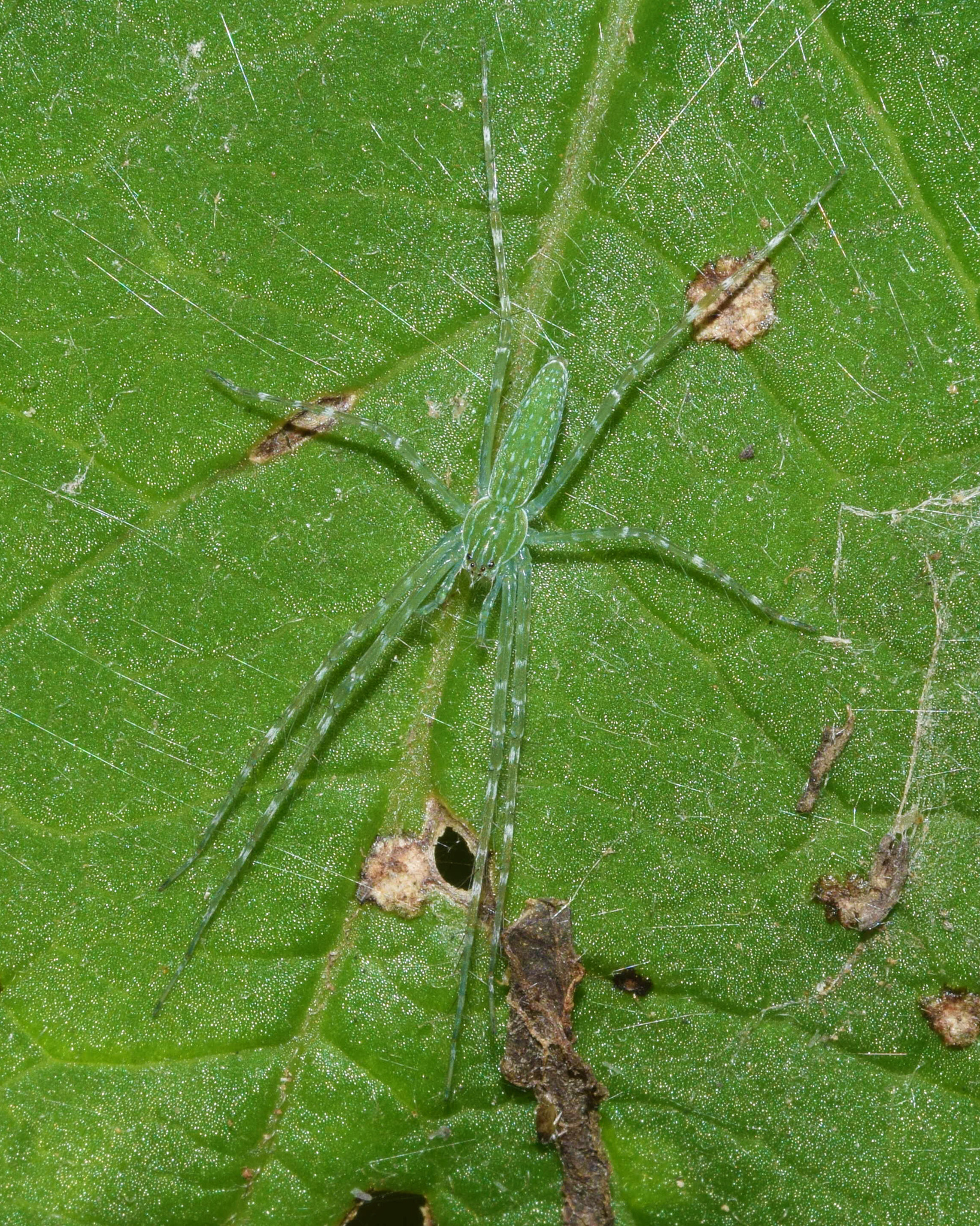

Scientific classification
- Kingdom: Animalia
- Phylum: Arthropoda
- Subphylum: Chelicerata
- Class: Arachnida
- Order: Araneae
- Infraorder: Araneomorphae
- Family: Pisauridae
- Genus: Hygropoda
- Species: H. tangana

Binomial name
- Hygropoda tangana (Roewer, 1955)

Synonyms
- Cispius tanganus Roewer, 1955

= Hygropoda tangana =

Green nursery-web spider

Species of spider

Hygropoda tangana is a spider species in the family Pisauridae. The species is commonly known as the green nursery-web spider.

== Distribution ==
Hygropoda tangana has been recorded from Tanzania, Kenya, Madagascar and South Africa. In South Africa, the species is known from Eastern Cape.

== Habitat and ecology ==
The species inhabits the Savanna and Grassland biomes at altitudes ranging from 1 to 860 m. Specimens have been sampled from foliage, where they live as free-living plant dwellers.

== Description ==
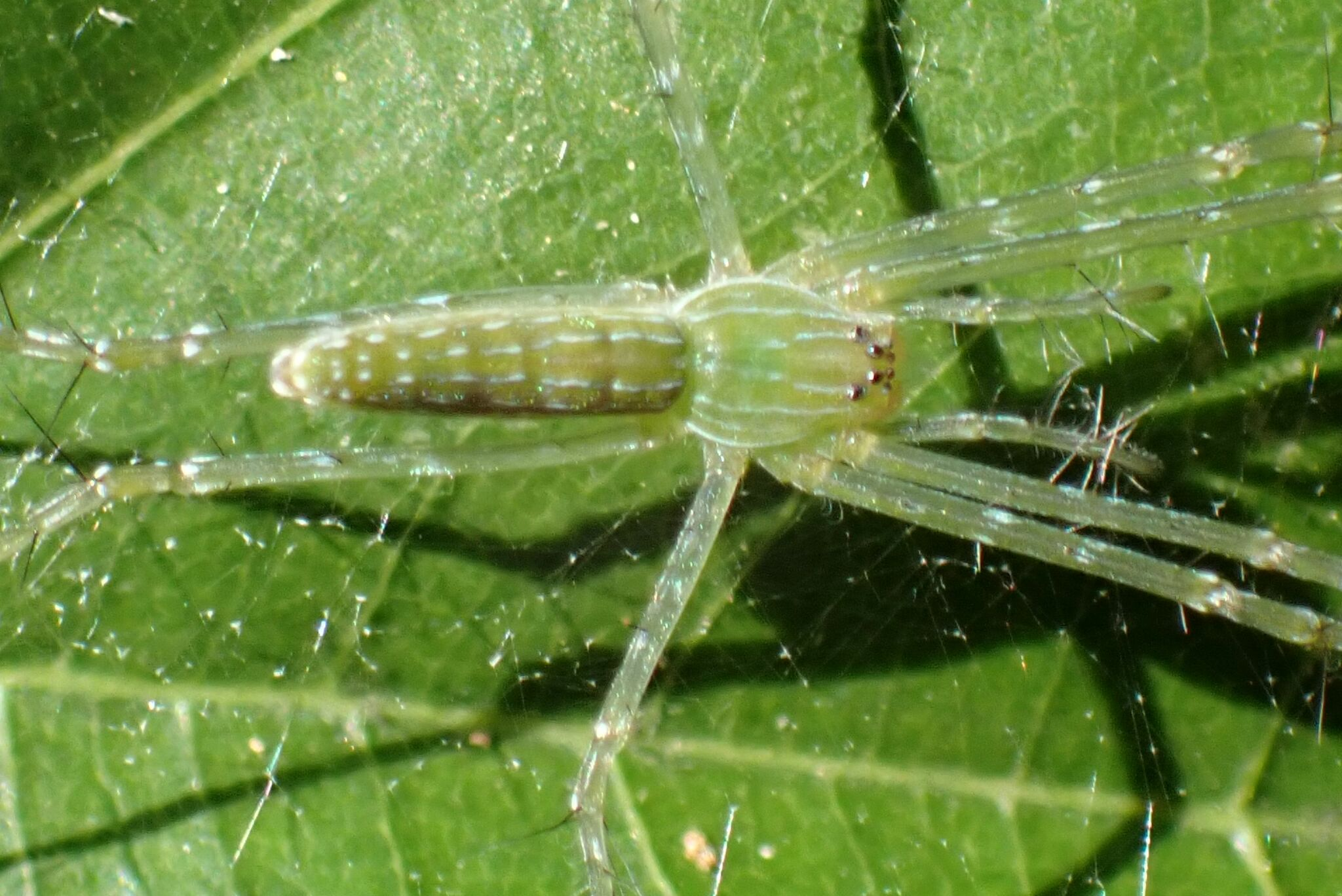

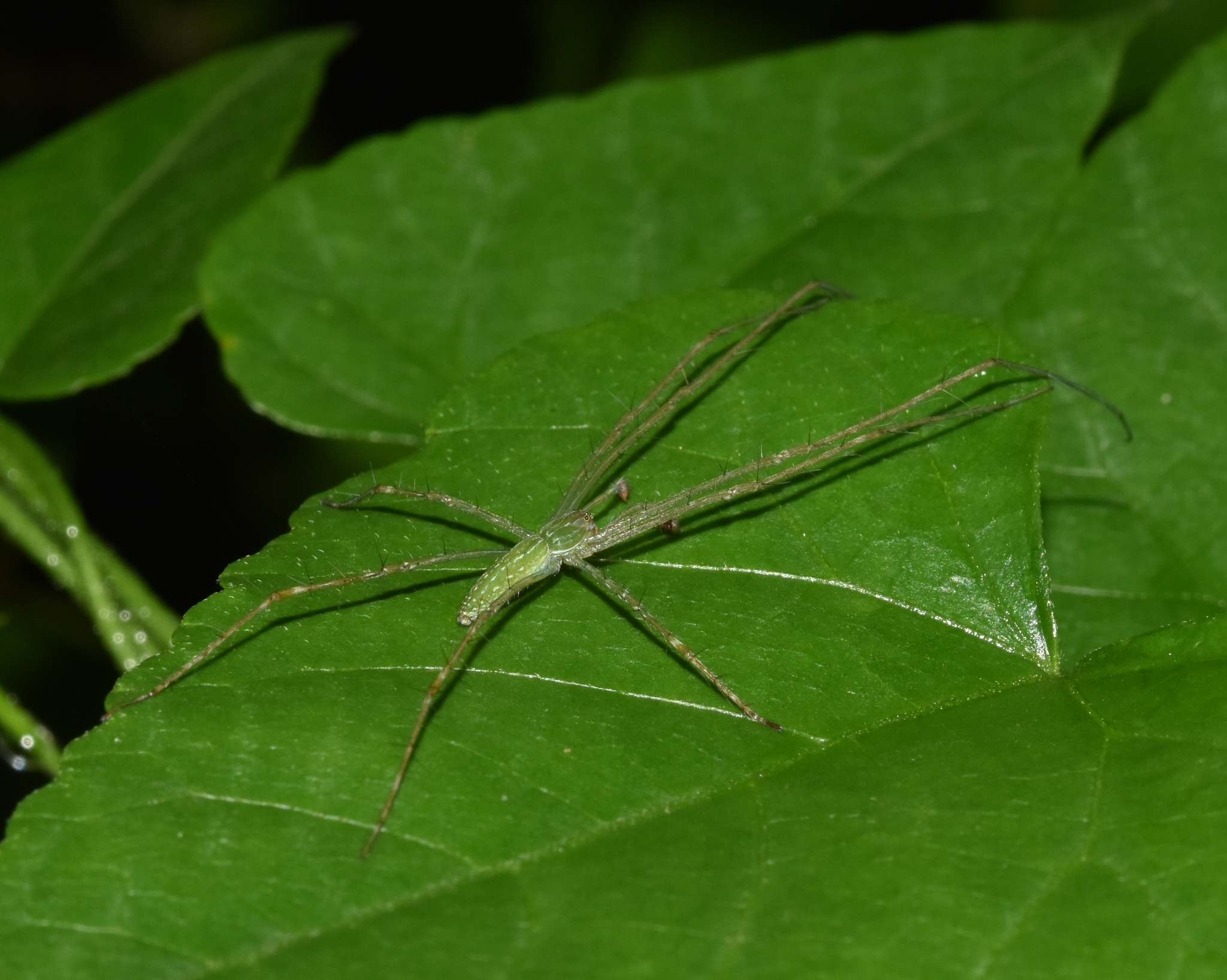

== Conservation ==
Hygropoda tangana is listed as Least Concern due to its wide geographical range in Africa. In South Africa, the species has been recorded from Mkhambathi Nature Reserve. There are no significant threats to the species.

== Taxonomy ==
The species was originally described by Roewer in 1955 as Cispius tanganus from Tanga in East Africa. It was transferred to the genus Hygropoda by Silva in 2013. The species is known from both sexes.
