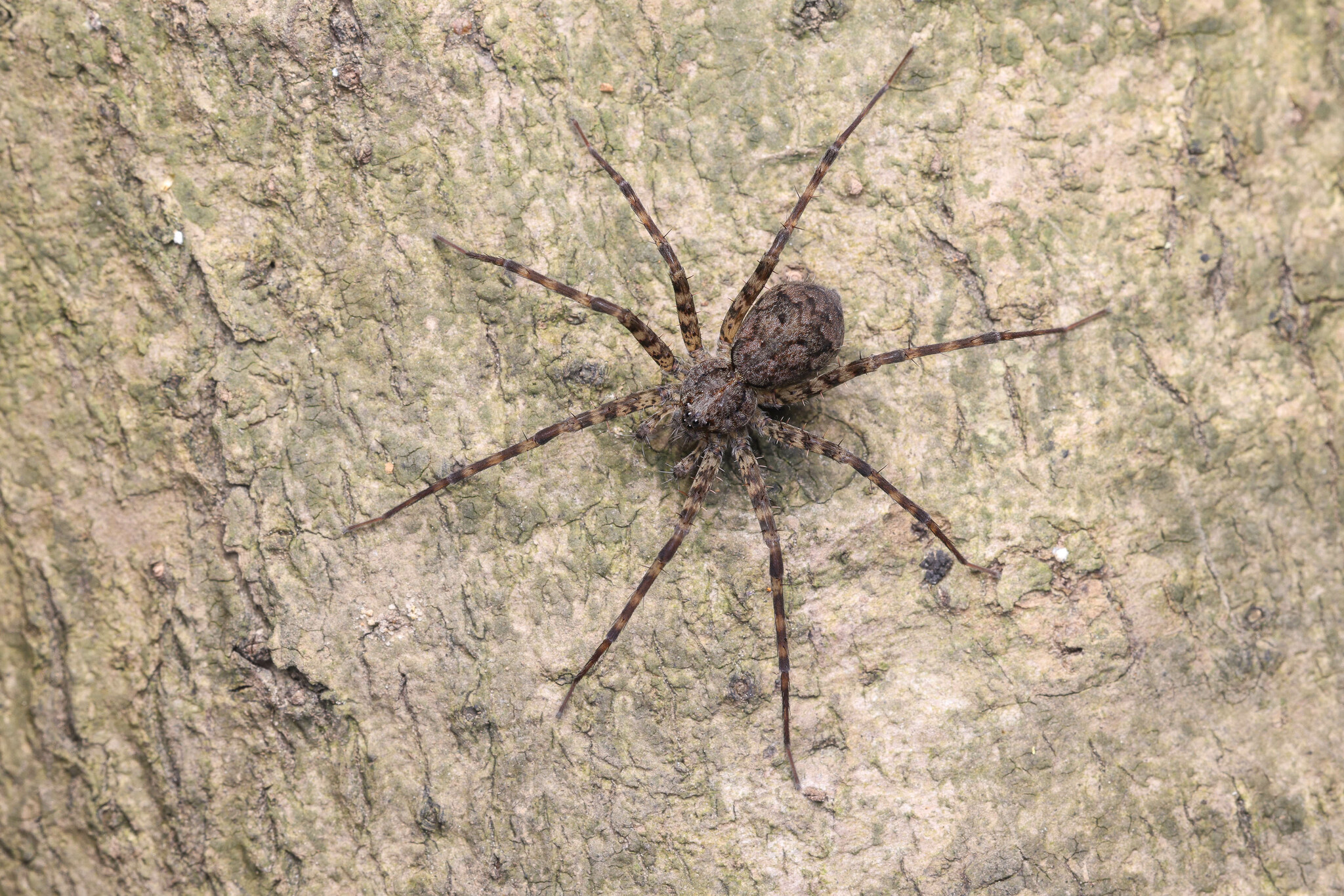
- M. kochi from Brisbane

Scientific classification
- Kingdom: Animalia
- Phylum: Arthropoda
- Subphylum: Chelicerata
- Class: Arachnida
- Order: Araneae
- Infraorder: Araneomorphae
- Family: Dolomedidae
- Genus: Mangromedes; Raven, 2018

Diversity
- 2 species

= Mangromedes =

Genus of spiders

Mangromedes is a genus of spiders in the family Dolomedidae. The genus was established in 2018 and was initially placed in the family Pisauridae, but was transferred to the resurrected family Dolomedidae in 2025 based on molecular phylogenetic studies.

== Etymology ==
The genus name is derived from "mangroves", reflecting the habitat where these spiders occur, combined with Dolomedes, a related genus of fishing spiders.

== Description ==
Mangromedes spiders are medium-sized with males and females of similar size. The carapace is saddle-shaped in profile, being lowest at the fovea. In males, the carapace is about as wide as long.

The eye arrangement consists of eight eyes in two rows. The anterior eye row is strongly recurved with the anterior lateral eyes overlapping the anterior median eyes. The anterior median eyes are clearly larger than the anterior lateral eyes but smaller than the posterior eyes.

The male pedipalp has a deeply divided retrolateral tibial apophysis, with the embolus resting on the prolateral edge. The tegulum is small with a large rectangular dorsal tegular process. Females are distinctive among Australian spiders in having very wide, long epigynal "wings" - sclerotised lateral extensions along the epigastric groove.

Like the related genus Ornodolomedes, the ventral spines on the tibiae and metatarsi of legs I and II are very long and overlapping, unlike the shorter spines found in Dolomedes. The chelicerae bear a large white boss with a sclerotised edge and have three prolateral and four retrolateral teeth.

== Habitat and behaviour ==
Mangromedes species are strictly nocturnal spiders that hunt freely in mangrove environments. They are found on mud surfaces, tree roots, and rotting wood within the mangrove ecosystem. These spiders are specialist mangrove inhabitants, representing one of the few spider genera specifically adapted to this challenging intertidal environment.

== Distribution ==
The genus is endemic to Australia, with species recorded from Queensland and the Northern Territory. Despite searches in other suitable mangrove habitats such as Darwin and Weipa, no specimens were found, indicating a restricted distribution.

== Taxonomy ==
Mangromedes was originally placed in the family Pisauridae when first described in 2018. However, molecular phylogenetic studies published in 2024 and 2025 demonstrated that the traditional family Pisauridae was not monophyletic.

Consequently, the family Dolomedidae, originally established by Eugène Simon in 1876, was resurrected to accommodate these genera, and Mangromedes was formally transferred to this family in 2025.

== Species ==
As of September 2025, the World Spider Catalog accepts the following species:

- Mangromedes kochi (Roewer, 1951) (type species) – Australia (Queensland)
- Mangromedes porosus Raven & Hebron, 2018 – Australia (Northern Territory)
