= Tasmomedes =

Scientific classification
- Kingdom: Animalia
- Phylum: Arthropoda
- Subphylum: Chelicerata
- Class: Arachnida
- Order: Araneae
- Infraorder: Araneomorphae
- Family: Dolomedidae
- Genus: Tasmomedes; Raven & Hebron, 2018
- Species: T. eberhardarum

Binomial name
- Tasmomedes eberhardarum (Strand, 1913)

Synonyms
- Dolomedes eberhardarum Strand, 1913

Genus of spiders

Tasmomedes is a monotypic genus of spiders in the family Dolomedidae containing only the species Tasmomedes eberhardarum. It is endemic to Australia, where it occurs in Victoria and Tasmania.

== Etymology ==
The genus name Tasmomedes is formed from the words Tasmania and Dolomedes, referring to the former placement of T. eberhardarum in the genus Dolomedes and to its presence on the island of Tasmania.

The species name honors the collectors of the male holotype, H. and A. Eberhard of Melbourne.

== Taxonomy ==
Dolomedes eberhardarum was originally described by Embrik Strand in 1913 based on a male holotype collected in Victoria, Australia. The type specimen is stored in the collection of the Museum Wiesbaden in Germany.

In a 2018 review of the family Pisauridae, Robert Raven and Wendy Hebron erected the new genus Tasmomedes for this species, combining it as Tasmomedes eberhardarum.

Tasmomedes was initially placed in the family Pisauridae upon its description by Raven and Hebron in 2018. However, following phylogenomic studies that rejected the monophyly of Pisauridae and resurrected the family Dolomedidae, Tasmomedes was transferred to Dolomedidae in 2025.

== Description ==
Tasmomedes eberhardarum differs from species of Megadolomedes in the absence of pseudosegmented tarsi in both males and females, the absence of a pseudotracheal furrow, the smaller retrolateral tibial apophysis, and less significant sexual dimorphism in size. It also has a sloping profile of the carapace, similar to Dolomedes.

Males of T. eberhardarum are distinguished from those of Dolomedes by their long cymbium and conductor, and small subdistal retrolateral tibial apophysis. The males have a total length of approximately 14.3 mm, with the carapace measuring 7.1 mm long and 6.2 mm wide.

Females are larger than males, with a total length of approximately 17.3 mm. The carapace measures 7.3 mm long and 6.2 mm wide. Females are notable for the circular course of ducts in the epigyne.

The cephalothorax is dark red-brown with wide brown edges and a narrow submarginal pale band. The opisthosoma is dark with light flanks and an irregular pale cardiac region.

== Distribution and habitat ==
Tasmomedes eberhardarum is known only from Victoria and Tasmania in Australia. In Tasmania, the species has been found in buttongrass moorland environments that lack flowing water. Multiple specimens have been collected from various locations across southwestern Tasmania, including areas around Lake Pedder, Mt Anne, and the McPartlan Pass region.

The species appears to be adapted to the specialized buttongrass moorland habitat, which is characterized by sedge-dominated vegetation and waterlogged soils without permanent flowing water bodies.
