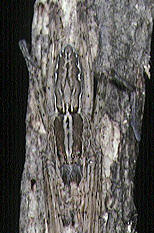
- female from Okinawa
- male from Okinawa

Scientific classification
- Kingdom: Animalia
- Phylum: Arthropoda
- Subphylum: Chelicerata
- Class: Arachnida
- Order: Araneae
- Infraorder: Araneomorphae
- Family: Pisauridae
- Genus: Hygropoda
- Species: H. higenaga

Binomial name
- Hygropoda higenaga (Kishida, 1936)

Synonyms
- Dolomedes higenaga Kishida, 1936; Hygropoda hippocrepiforma Wang, 1993

= Hygropoda higenaga =

Flexible-legged Spider

Species of nursery web spider

Hygropoda higenaga is a species of nursery web spider in the family Pisauridae. Originally described as Dolomedes higenaga by Kishida in 1936, it was transferred to the genus Hygropoda by Yaginuma in 1965. The species is distributed across East Asia, including China, Taiwan, and Japan.

== Etymology ==
The specific name higenaga derives from Japanese ヒゲナガ, where hige (髭) means "mustache" and naga (長) means "long".

== Distribution ==
H. higenaga is found across East Asia, with confirmed records from China, Taiwan, and Japan. In China, it has been documented from multiple provinces including Yunnan.

== Habitat ==
Like other nursery web spiders, H. higenaga is typically found in terrestrial environments where it can construct protective webs for its offspring. Members of the genus Hygropoda are known to inhabit areas near water sources and vegetation.

== Description ==
H. higenaga exhibits the typical characteristics of nursery web spiders, with elongated legs and a streamlined body form. The species shows sexual dimorphism, with females generally larger than males. Based on the original description, females have a body length of approximately 9.2 mm with a cephalothorax measuring 4.30 × 3.70 mm and abdomen 5.20 × 2.40 mm. Males are smaller, with a body length of about 10.4 mm and cephalothorax measuring 4.80 × 4.20 mm.

The species displays brownish coloration with distinctive markings. The cephalothorax shows a yellowish-brown color with darker lateral bands, while the abdomen exhibits complex patterns including cardiac markings and lateral stripes. Like other members of its genus, H. higenaga possesses the characteristic three claws on each tarsus and has well-developed chelicerae with three teeth on both the anterior and posterior margins.

== Behavior and life cycle ==
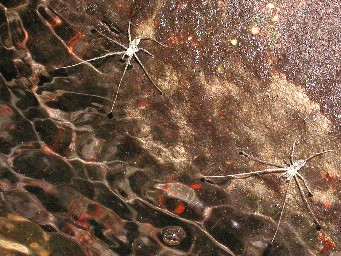
waiting position

As a nursery web spider, females of H. higenaga exhibit characteristic maternal care behavior. They carry their egg sacs in their chelicerae until the eggs are ready to hatch, at which point they construct a protective nursery web. The female guards this nursery web until the spiderlings are ready to disperse after their first molt.

The species is an active hunter that does not construct prey-capture webs, instead relying on ambush tactics to capture small arthropod prey.

== Taxonomy ==
Hygropoda higenaga was originally described by Kishida in 1936 as Dolomedes higenaga based on specimens from Japan. In 1965, Yaginuma transferred the species to the genus Hygropoda, recognizing its closer affinities with other Asian species in that genus rather than the primarily aquatic Dolomedes.

The species Hygropoda hippocrepiforma, described by Wang in 1993 from China, was later determined to be a junior synonym of H. higenaga by Zhang and Zhang in 2003.
