= Bradystichus =

Scientific classification
- Kingdom: Animalia
- Phylum: Arthropoda
- Subphylum: Chelicerata
- Class: Arachnida
- Order: Araneae
- Infraorder: Araneomorphae
- Family: Dolomedidae
- Genus: Bradystichus; Simon, 1884

Type species
- B. calligaster Simon, 1884

Species
- 5, see text

Genus of spiders

Bradystichus is a genus of New Caledonian spiders in the family Dolomedidae that was first described by Eugène Louis Simon in 1884.

== Species ==
As of January 2025 it contains five species, all endemic to New Caledonia:

- Bradystichus aoupinie Platnick & Forster, 1993 – New Caledonia
- Bradystichus calligaster Simon, 1884 (type) – New Caledonia
- Bradystichus crispatus Simon, 1884 – New Caledonia
- Bradystichus panie Platnick & Forster, 1993 – New Caledonia
- Bradystichus tandji Platnick & Forster, 1993 – New Caledonia
