= Megadolomedes johndouglasi =

Scientific classification
- Kingdom: Animalia
- Phylum: Arthropoda
- Subphylum: Chelicerata
- Class: Arachnida
- Order: Araneae
- Infraorder: Araneomorphae
- Family: Dolomedidae
- Genus: Megadolomedes
- Species: M. johndouglasi

Binomial name
- Megadolomedes johndouglasi Raven & Hebron, 2018

Synonyms
- Dolomedes australianus Hickman, 1967 (misidentified)

Species of spider

Megadolomedes johndouglasi is a species of spider in the family Dolomedidae (formerly Pisauridae, water spiders) native to southeastern Australia. It is the largest pisaurid spider found in Tasmania and Victoria.

== Etymology ==
The species is named in honour of Mr John Douglas, a citizen scientist and honorary member at the Queen Victoria Museum and Art Gallery in Launceston, who persistently drew attention to the significance of the larger male specimens that had only been known from photographs.

== Taxonomy ==
The species was previously misidentified as Dolomedes australianus by Hickman in 1967. It was formally described as a new species by Robert Raven and Wendy Hebron in 2018 as part of their comprehensive review of Australian Pisauridae.

== Description ==
Megadolomedes johndouglasi exhibits significant sexual dimorphism, with females being considerably larger than males.

Both sexes have chelicerae with teeth arrangements characteristic of the genus, and the eyes are arranged in the typical pisaurid pattern.

=== Females ===
The female allotype is much larger, with a cephalothorax length of 9.67 mm and width of 8.67 mm, and an opisthosoma length of 10.50 mm and width of 7.17 mm, giving a total body length of 20.2 mm. Females have a dark brown cephalothorax with a light brown edge and broad pale submarginal band extending to the clypeus. The opisthosoma is dorsally dark brown with two full-length bands of white hairs along the edges that partially form three chevrons posteriorly. The legs are annulated (banded). Females differ from M. australianus in their abdominal pattern, relatively narrower epigyne, and fewer spermathecal coils.

=== Males ===
The male holotype has a cephalothorax length of 6.80 mm and width of 5.84 mm, with an opisthosoma length of 4.80 mm and width of 4.00 mm, giving a total body length of 11.6 mm. Males are distinguished from the related M. australianus by their long cylindrical palpal tibia, longer curved dorsal tegular process, and the fulcrum extending only to the subapical cymbium.

== Distribution and habitat ==
Megadolomedes johndouglasi is found in southeastern Australia, specifically in Tasmania and Victoria. Specimens have been collected from various locations including river margins and stream-side habitats, which is typical for water spiders in the family Pisauridae. Notable collection sites include the Forth River in Tasmania, Gibbo River in Victoria, and various other waterways throughout both states.
