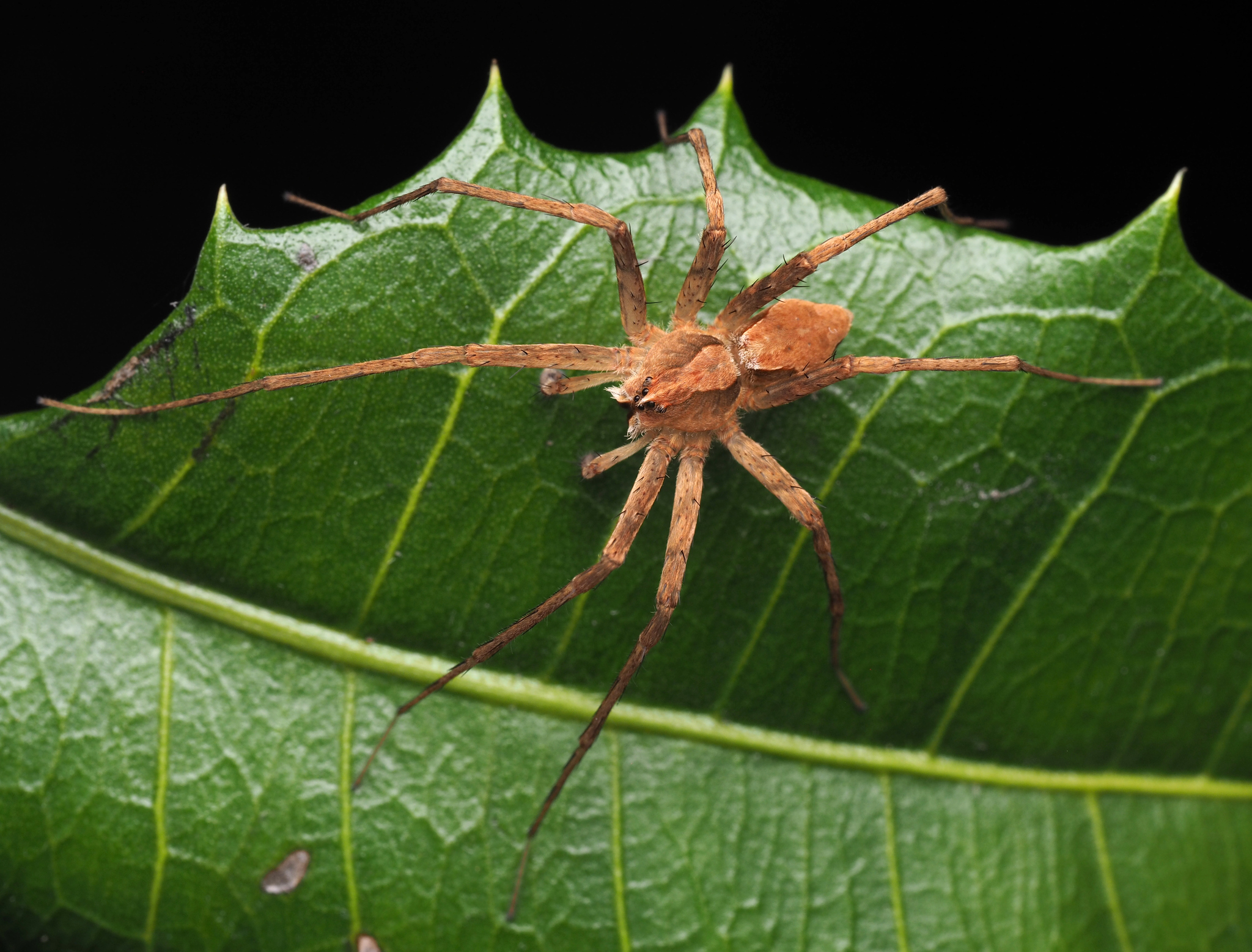
- O. benrevelli from Queensland
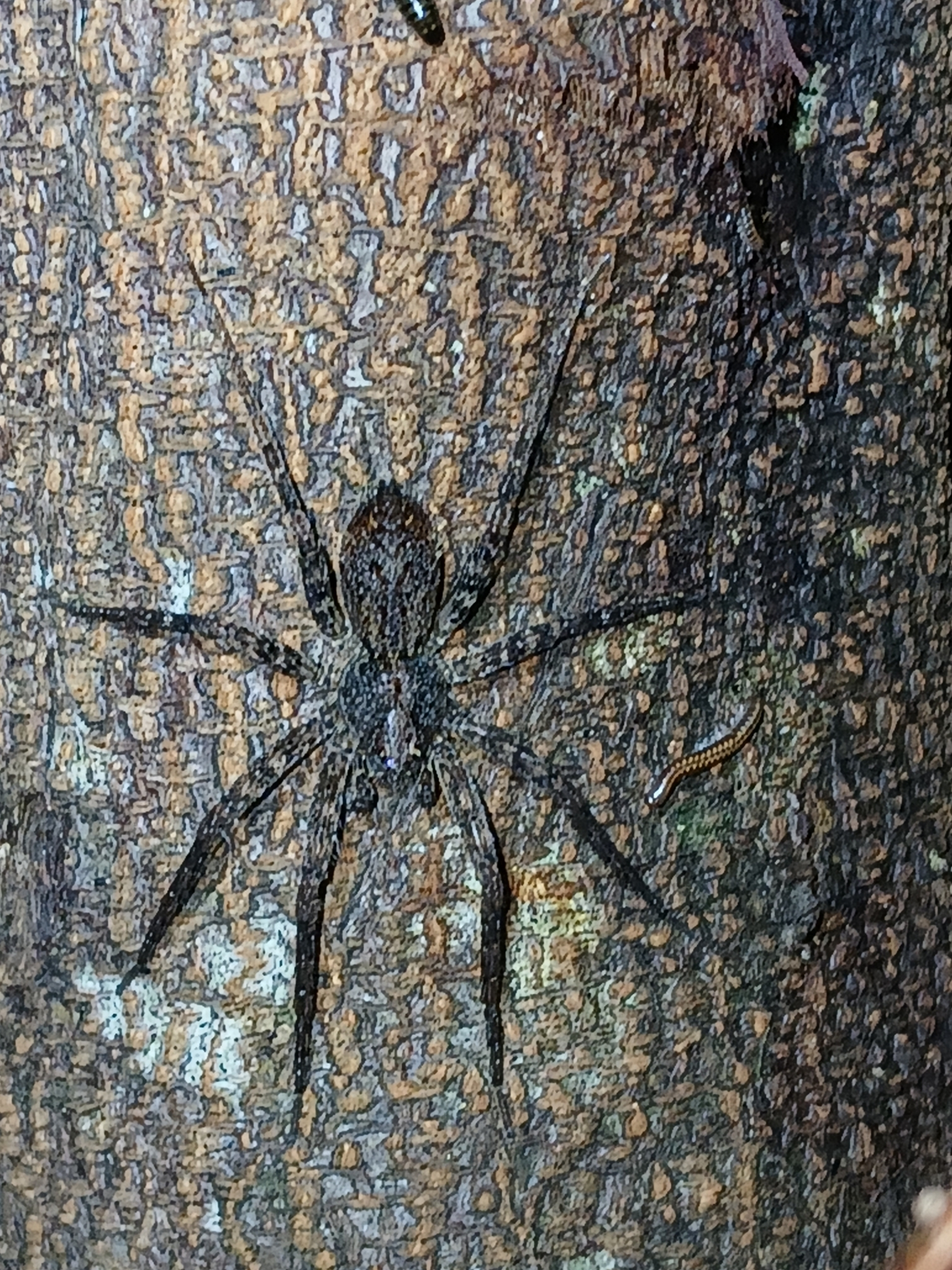
- O. nicholsoni from Western Australia

Scientific classification
- Kingdom: Animalia
- Phylum: Arthropoda
- Subphylum: Chelicerata
- Class: Arachnida
- Order: Araneae
- Infraorder: Araneomorphae
- Family: Dolomedidae
- Genus: Ornodolomedes; Raven & Hebron, 2018

Type species
- Ornodolomedes benrevelli Raven & Hebron, 2018

Species
- 10, see text

= Ornodolomedes =

Genus of spiders

Ornodolomedes, commonly known as rainforest sprites, is a genus of Australian spiders in the family Dolomedidae. The genus and its ten known species were described by Robert Raven & Wendy Hebron in 2018.

The name Ornodolomedes is a combination of the words ornate and Dolomedes.

== Taxonomy ==
The genus Ornodolomedes was described by Australian arachnologists Robert Raven and Wendy Hebron in a 2018 review of the family Pisauridae. Ten newly described species were placed in the genus upon its description, with Ornodolomedes benrevelli designated as the type species. Ornodolomedes was placed in the family Pisauridae upon its initial description, but would be transferred to the family Dolomedidae in 2025.

== Distribution and habitat ==
Ornodolomedes species are known from the Australian states of Queensland, New South Wales, South Australia, Victoria, and Western Australia. They are arboreal and can be found on bark and leaves in rainforests, vine thickets, and riverine areas within eucalypt forests.

== Species ==
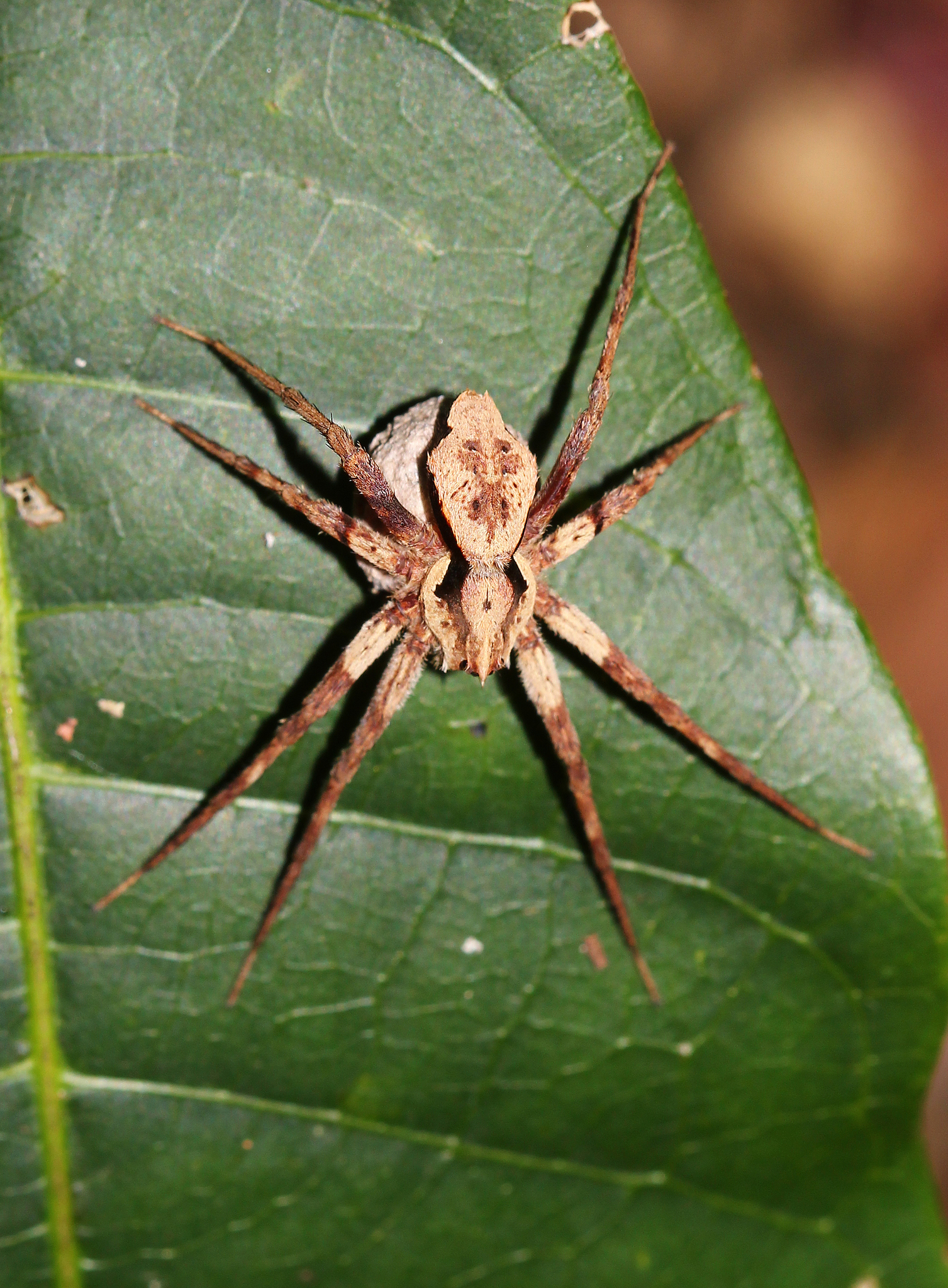
O. mickfanningi

This genus includes the following species:

- Ornodolomedes benrevelli Raven & Hebron, 2018 — Australia (Queensland)
- Ornodolomedes gorenpul Raven & Hebron, 2018 — Australia (Queensland)
- Ornodolomedes marshi Raven & Hebron, 2018 — Australia (Queensland)
- Ornodolomedes mickfanningi Raven & Hebron, 2018 — Australia (Queensland)
- Ornodolomedes nebulosus Raven & Hebron, 2018 — Australia (Queensland)
- Ornodolomedes nicholsoni Raven & Hebron, 2018 — Australia (Western Australia)
- Ornodolomedes southcotti Raven & Hebron, 2018 — Australia (South Australia)
- Ornodolomedes staricki Raven & Hebron, 2018 — Australia (Victoria)
- Ornodolomedes xypee Raven & Hebron, 2018 — Australia (Queensland)
- Ornodolomedes yalangi Raven & Hebron, 2018 — Australia (Queensland)
