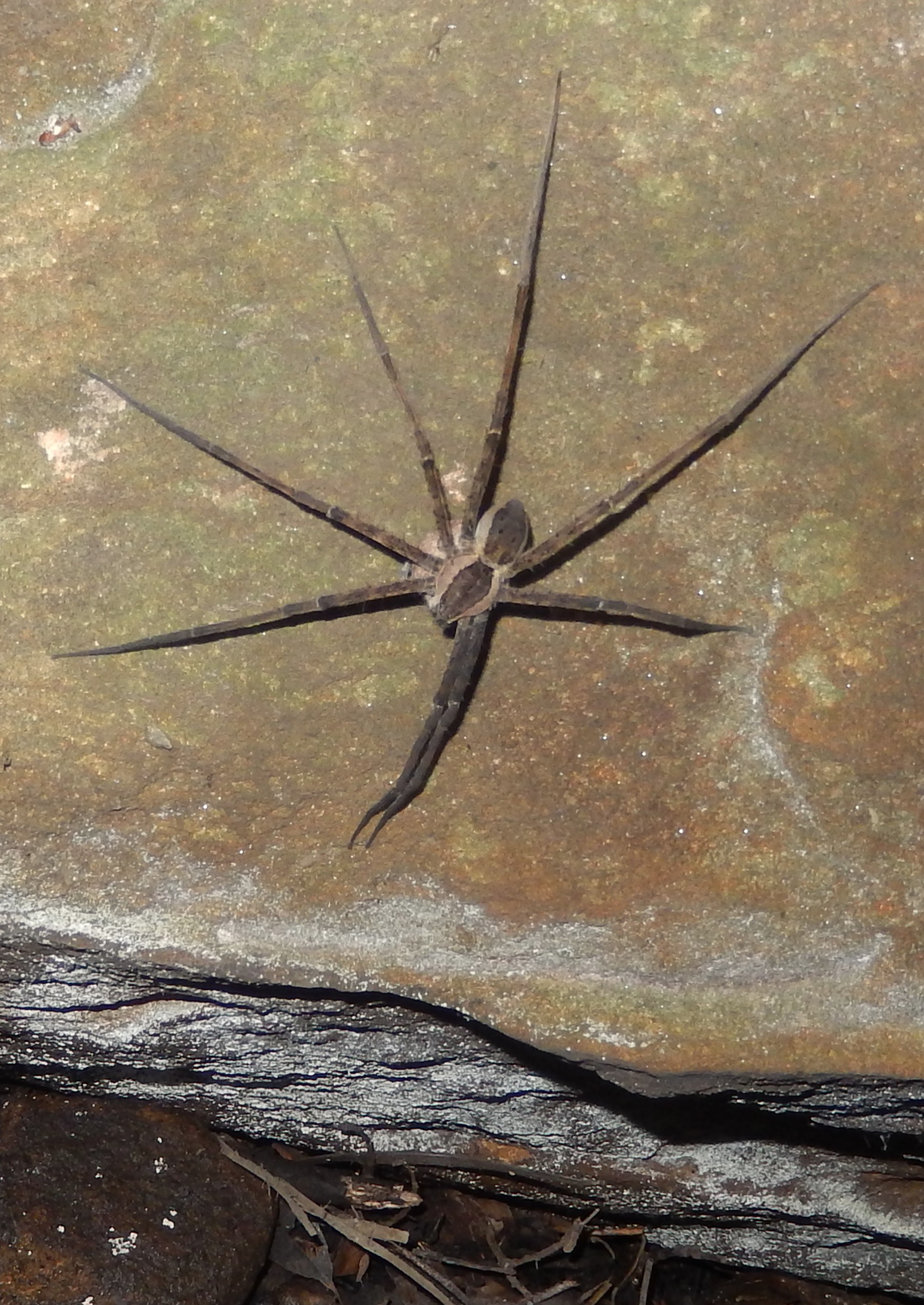
- Megadolomedes australianus

Scientific classification
- Kingdom: Animalia
- Phylum: Arthropoda
- Subphylum: Chelicerata
- Class: Arachnida
- Order: Araneae
- Infraorder: Araneomorphae
- Family: Dolomedidae
- Genus: Megadolomedes; Davies & Raven, 1980

Type species
- Dolomedes australianus L. Koch, 1865

Species
- 4, see text

= Megadolomedes =

Genus of spiders

Megadolomedes is a genus of spider in the family Dolomedidae found in Eastern Australia. They are found near creeks, streams, and ponds, and are capable of running on water. Their diet includes small fish, frogs, and aquatic insects.

== Taxonomy ==
The genus was originally established by Davies and Raven in 1980, who transferred the type species Dolomedes australianus and diagnosed a new genus based on males from Queensland. The genus was originally placed in the family Pisauridae, but was later transferred to the Dolomedidae by Morris, Hazzi & Hormiga in 2025.

Davies and Raven initially synonymised Dolomedes cervinus L. Koch, 1876 and Dolomedes trux Lamb, 1911 with Megadolomedes australianus. However, Raven & Hebron in 2018 revalidated Megadolomedes trux, recognising that the males from Queensland that Davies and Raven had attributed to M. australianus were actually the restored species M. trux.

== Description ==
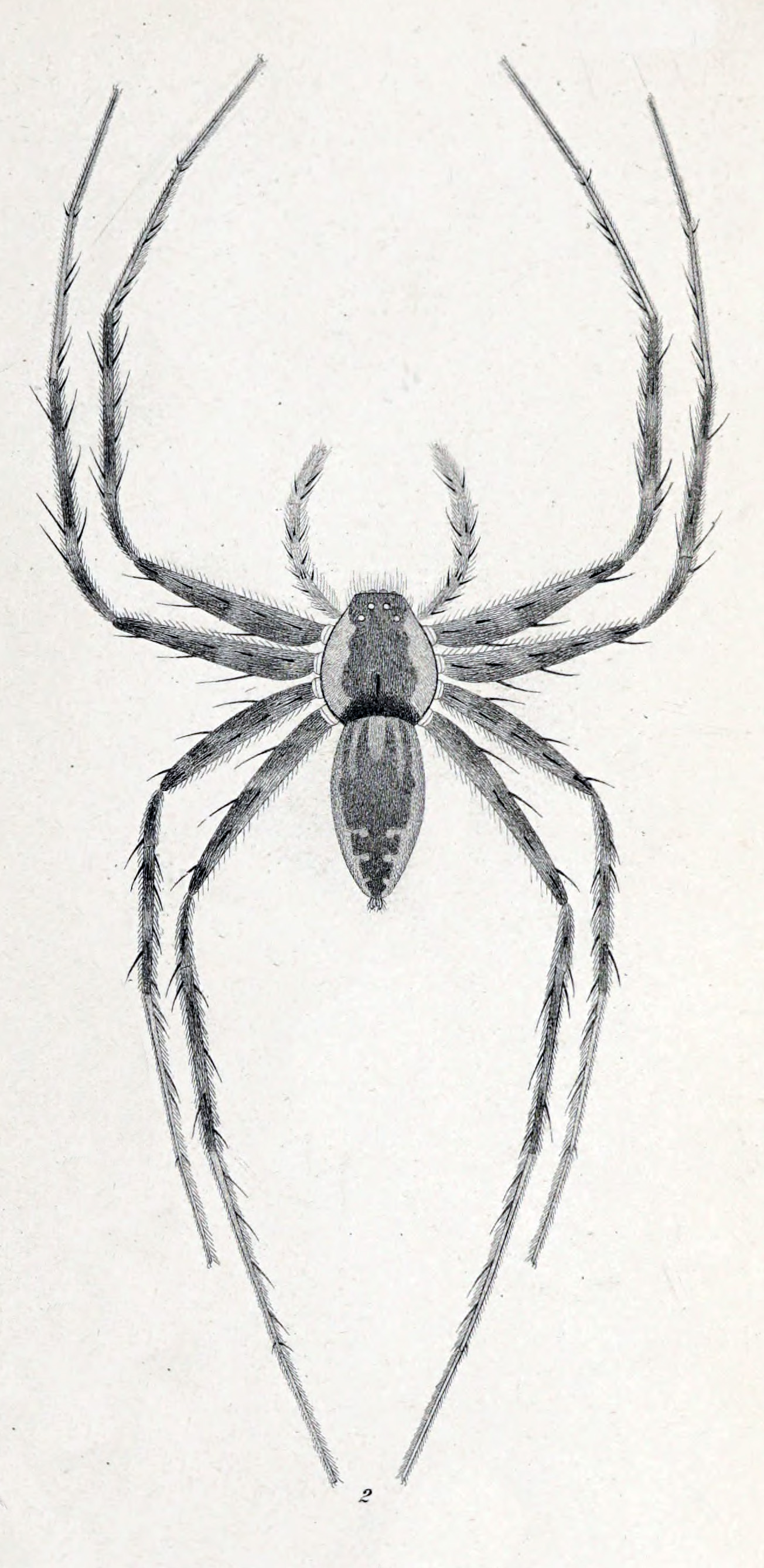
female M. australianus from L. Koch 1876

Megadolomedes spiders are distinguished from other Australian pisaurids by their long, slender, pseudosegmented tarsi, except for the genus Hygropoda. They differ from Hygropoda in having small anterior lateral eyes arranged in a distinctly recurved line, compared to the large, straight arrangement in Hygropoda. Males have a small, simple conical retrolateral tibial apophysis, while females are notably larger and have very wide epigynes.

The carapace is flat in lateral view, sloping down very little towards the eye region. The posterior eye row is larger than the anterior eye row, with the anterior eye row being approximately 0.6–0.7 the width of the posterior eye row. Sexual dimorphism varies among species, being notable in M. australianus and M. trux, but minor in M. johndouglasi.

== Habitat and behaviour ==
Megadolomedes are creekside spiders that hunt both during the day and at night, typically found beside creeks with at least their first pair of legs in contact with the water. They are semi-aquatic spiders capable of running on the water surface.

== Distribution ==
The genus is distributed throughout eastern Australia, ranging from Queensland in the north to Tasmania in the south.

== Species ==
As of September 2025, it contains 4 species:

- Megadolomedes australianus (L. Koch, 1865) (type) – New South Wales
- Megadolomedes johndouglasi Raven & Hebron, 2018 – Tasmania, Victoria
- Megadolomedes nord Raven & Hebron, 2018 – northern Queensland
- Megadolomedes trux (Lamb, 1911) – New South Wales, Queensland
