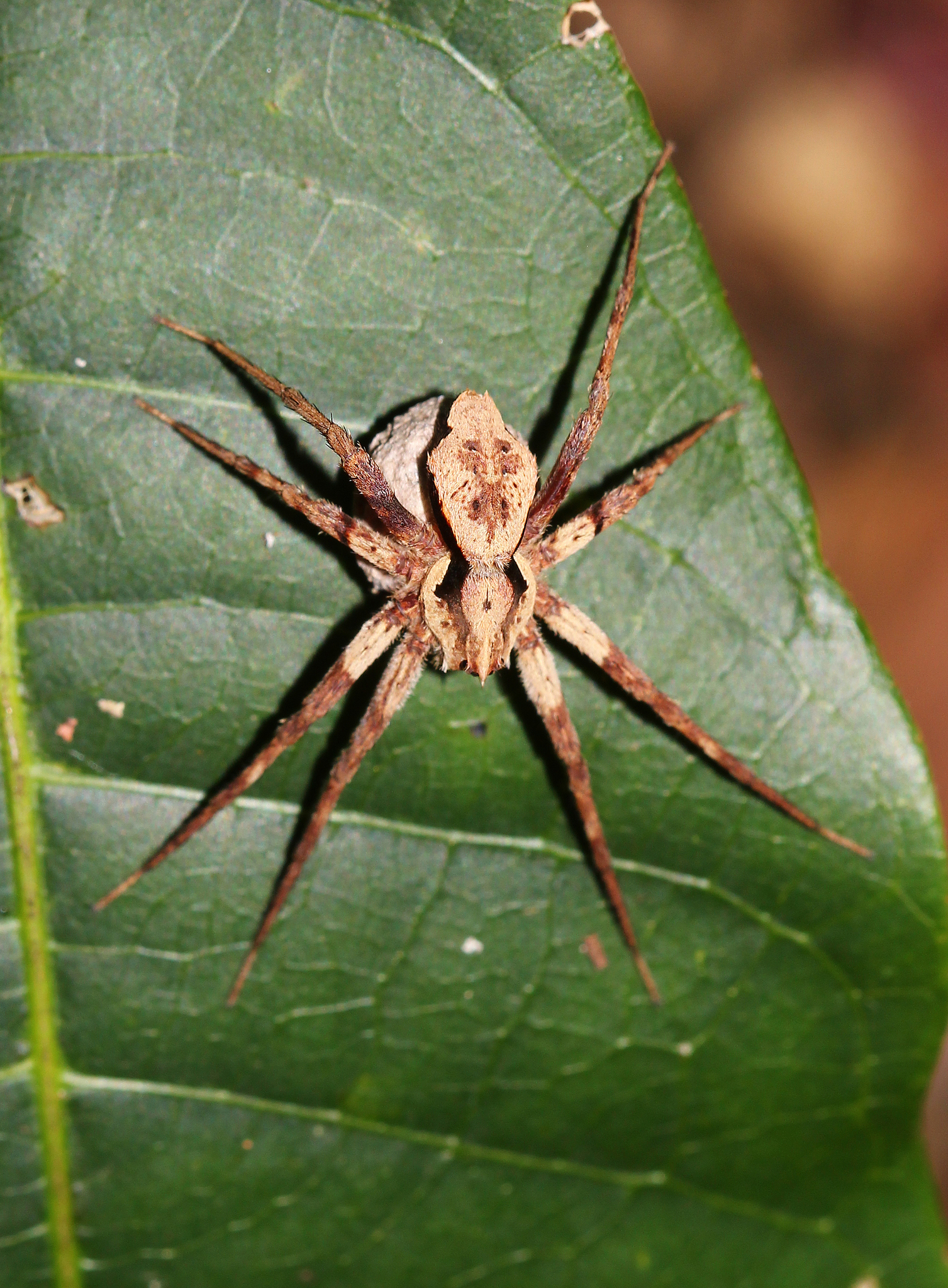
- female O. mickfanningi with eggsac

Scientific classification
- Kingdom: Animalia
- Phylum: Arthropoda
- Subphylum: Chelicerata
- Class: Arachnida
- Order: Araneae
- Infraorder: Araneomorphae
- Family: Dolomedidae
- Genus: Ornodolomedes
- Species: O. mickfanningi

Binomial name
- Ornodolomedes mickfanningi Raven & Hebron, 2018

= Ornodolomedes mickfanningi =

Masked wood sprite

Species of spider

Ornodolomedes mickfanningi is a species of spider in the genus Ornodolomedes. It is endemic to Queensland, Australia.

== Etymology ==
The species epithet mickfanningi honours Australian surfer Mick Fanning.

The common name "Masked wood sprite" was conferred by Ricardo Leite as part of the World Science Festival Brisbane launch.

== Taxonomy ==
Ornodolomedes mickfanningi was described by Robert Raven and Wendy Hebron in 2018 as part of their comprehensive review of the water spider family Pisauridae in Australia and New Caledonia. The genus Ornodolomedes was originally placed in Pisauridae, but was later transferred to the family Dolomedidae in 2025 following phylogenetic studies that found Pisauridae to be paraphyletic.

== Distribution ==
O. mickfanningi is known only from the lower slopes up to 700 metres of Lamington National Park, close to Canungra, in south-eastern Queensland.

== Habitat ==
The spiders are found under logs and rocks in riverine gallery thickets during the day. Like other members of the genus Ornodolomedes, they hunt freely at night on leaves in rainforest and closed eucalypt forest.

== Description ==
The holotype male has a carapace 4.00 mm long and 3.44 mm wide, with an opisthosoma 4.64 mm long and 2.72 mm wide, giving a total body length of 8.6 mm.

The carapace is yellow brown with a slightly darker submarginal band most distinct posteriorly, featuring a red batwing-shaped area behind the posterior eye row and a paler central ovoid region. The abdomen is pentagonal and posteriorly strongly tapered, partially accentuated by dark brown flanks. It is dorsally yellow brown with red-brown mottling and central paler regions, with dark shoulders anterior laterally. The legs are fawn brown.

Males have a distinctive palpal bulb with the tibia long and slender but shorter than the cymbium. The cymbium has a small retroventral lobe and more distal ridge.

Females are slightly larger than males, with the allotype female measuring 9.32 mm in total body length. The carapace is orange brown with two dark ovoid areas submarginally in posterior corners and a rhomboidal outline in the prefoveal zone. They have tufts of white hair between the posterior median eyes and over the posterior lateral eyes. The epigyne is about as wide as long with a short, narrow median scape delimiting two trianguloid opercula.
