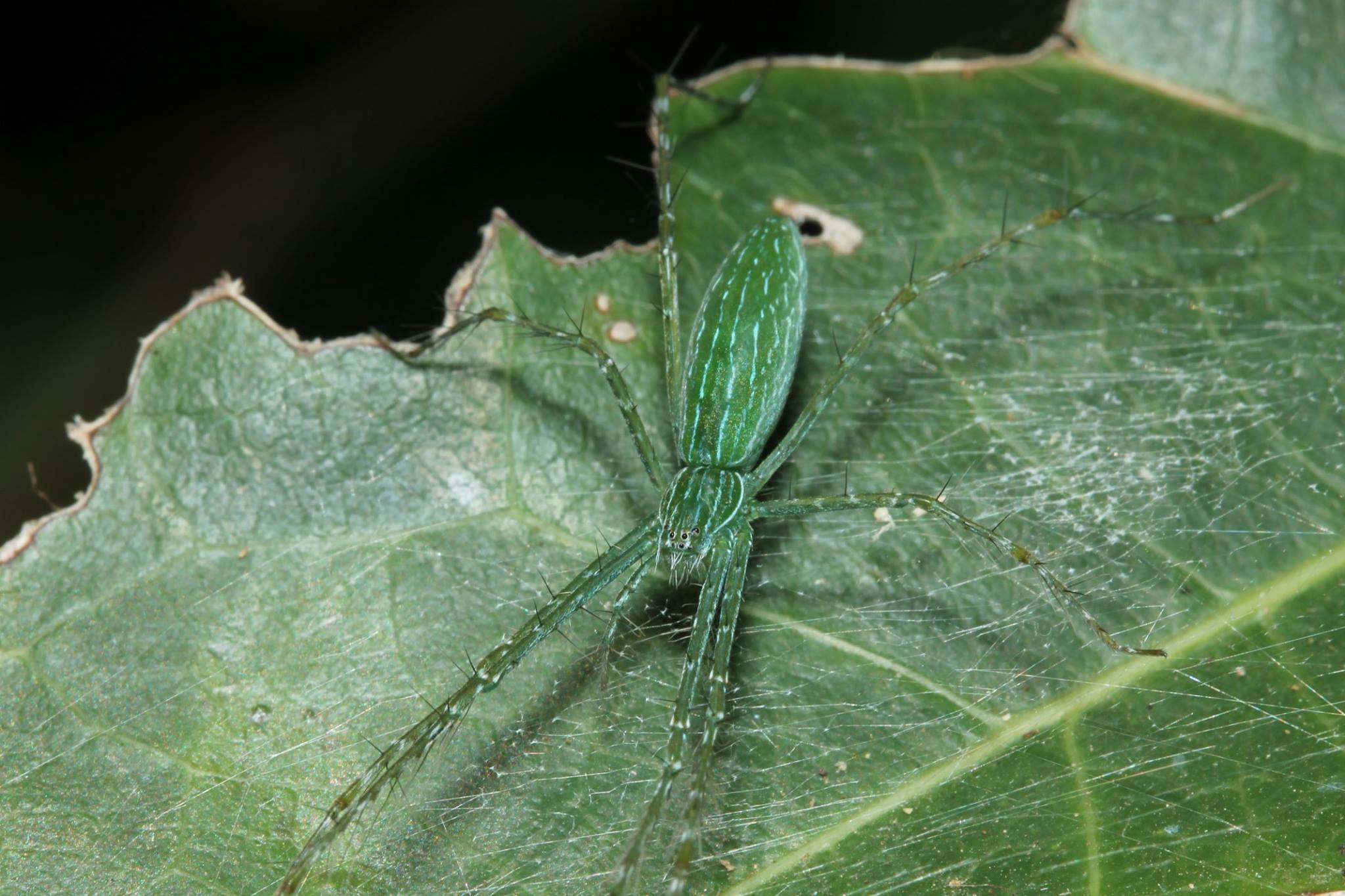
- Hygropoda sp.
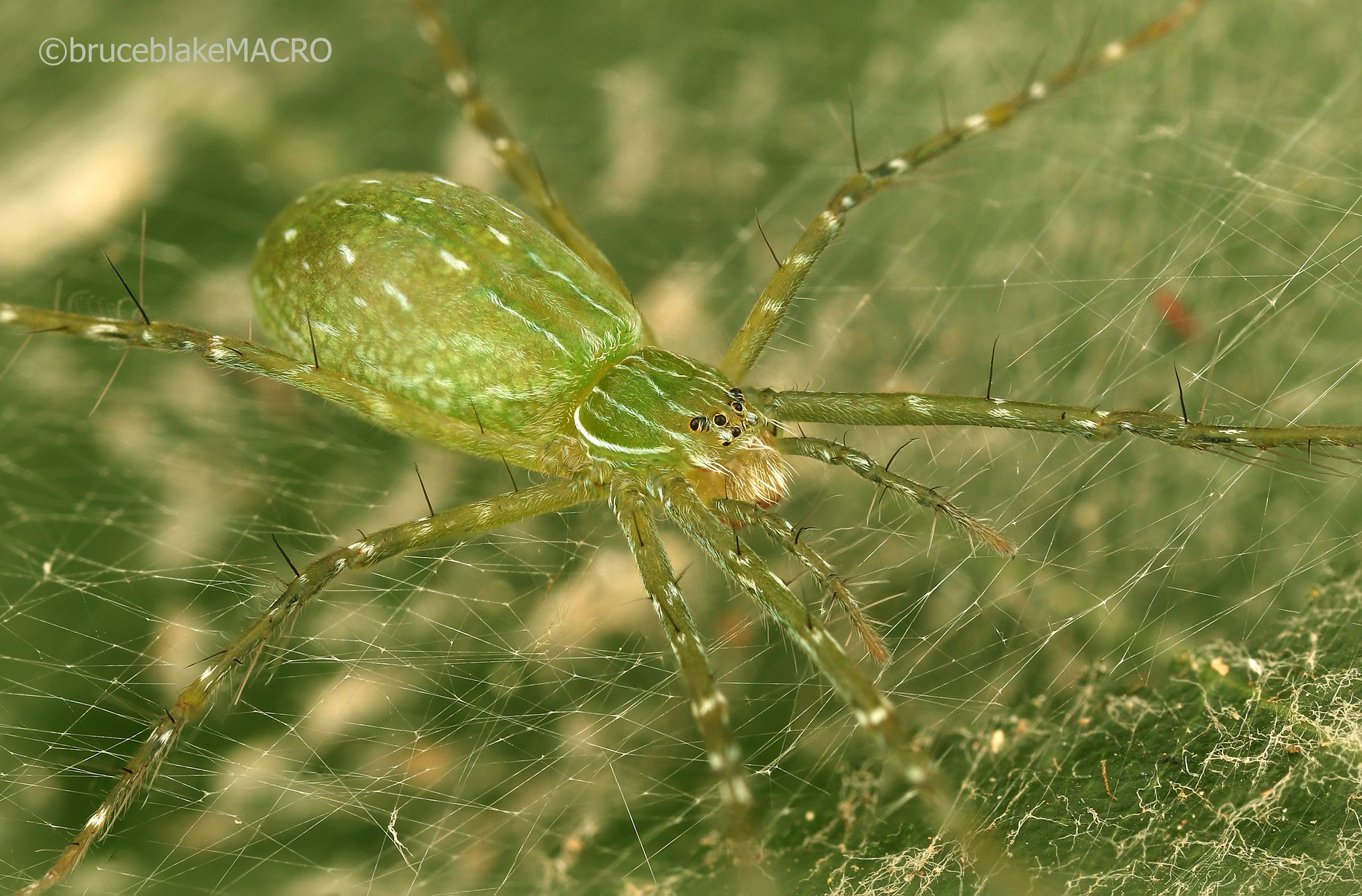
- Hygropoda sp.

Scientific classification
- Kingdom: Animalia
- Phylum: Arthropoda
- Subphylum: Chelicerata
- Class: Arachnida
- Order: Araneae
- Infraorder: Araneomorphae
- Family: Pisauridae
- Genus: Hygropoda; Thorell, 1894

Type species
- H. prognatha Thorell, 1894

Species
- 26, see text

= Hygropoda =

Genus of spiders

Hygropoda is a genus of nursery web spiders that was first described by Tamerlan Thorell in 1894.

== Distribution ==
Spiders in this genus are found in Asia and Africa, with H. lineata reaching Australia.

== Life style ==
These are arboreal diurnal and nocturnal spiders that hunt on small sheet-webs over leaves in forest areas.

== Description ==
Males and females are of similar size, with live specimens appearing green in colour. The carapace profile is flat with a steep clypeus. The eyes are arranged in two rows and are subequal in size, with the anterior lateral eyes being smallest. The eyes of the posterior row are larger than those of the anterior row, and the median ocular quadrangle is narrower anteriorly than posteriorly.

The abdomen is long and slender, tapering towards the back. The legs are very long, with the tarsi of both males and females being curved and pseudosegmented. The trochanters have shallow notches.

== Taxonomy ==
The African species have not been revised.

== Species ==
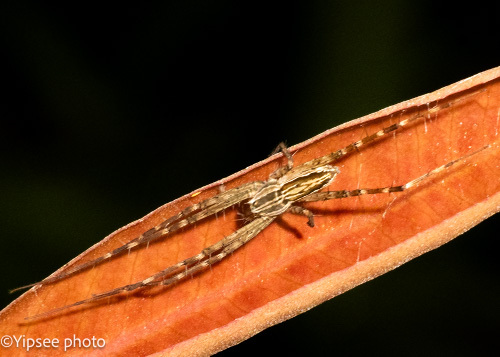
H. argentata

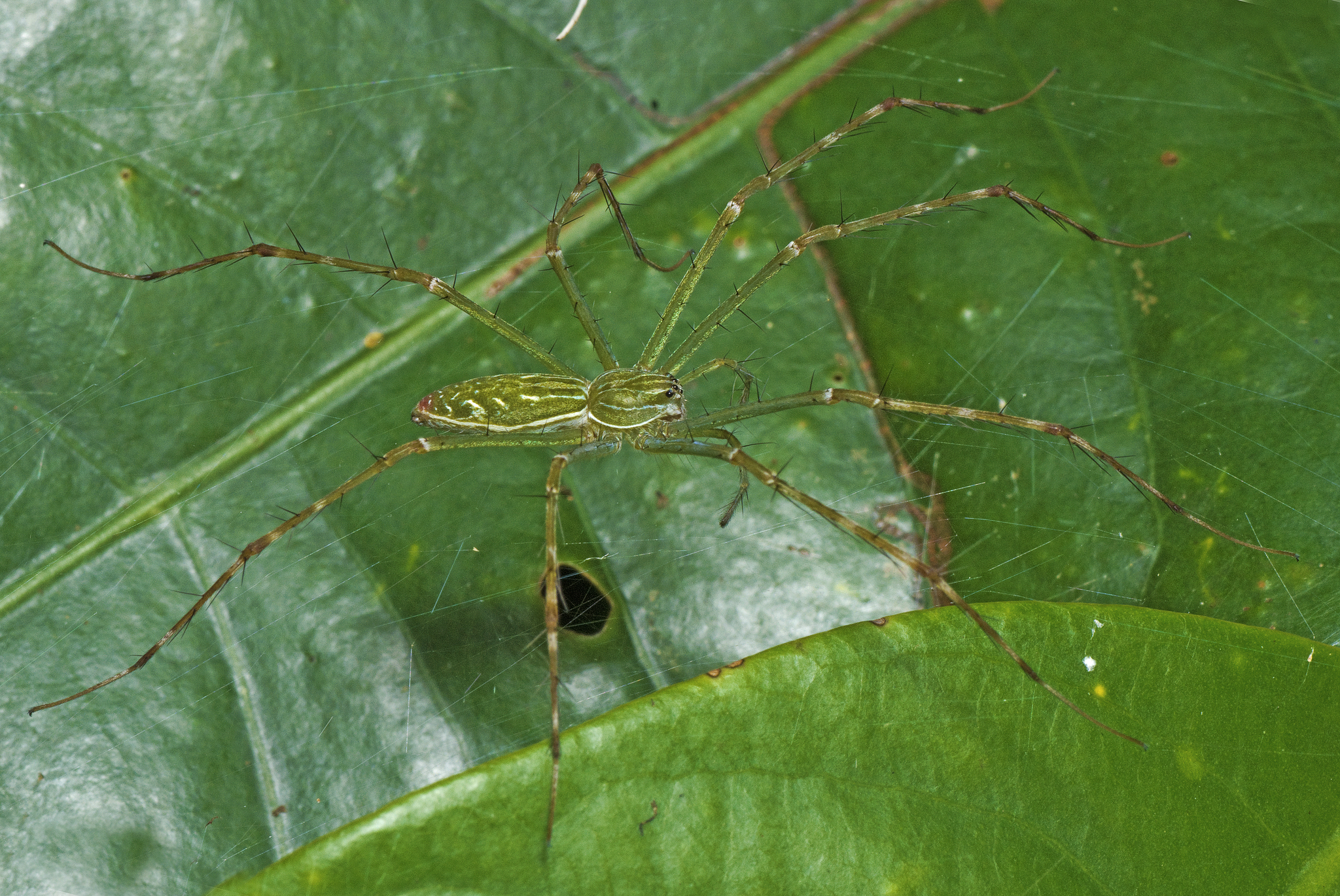
H. lineata

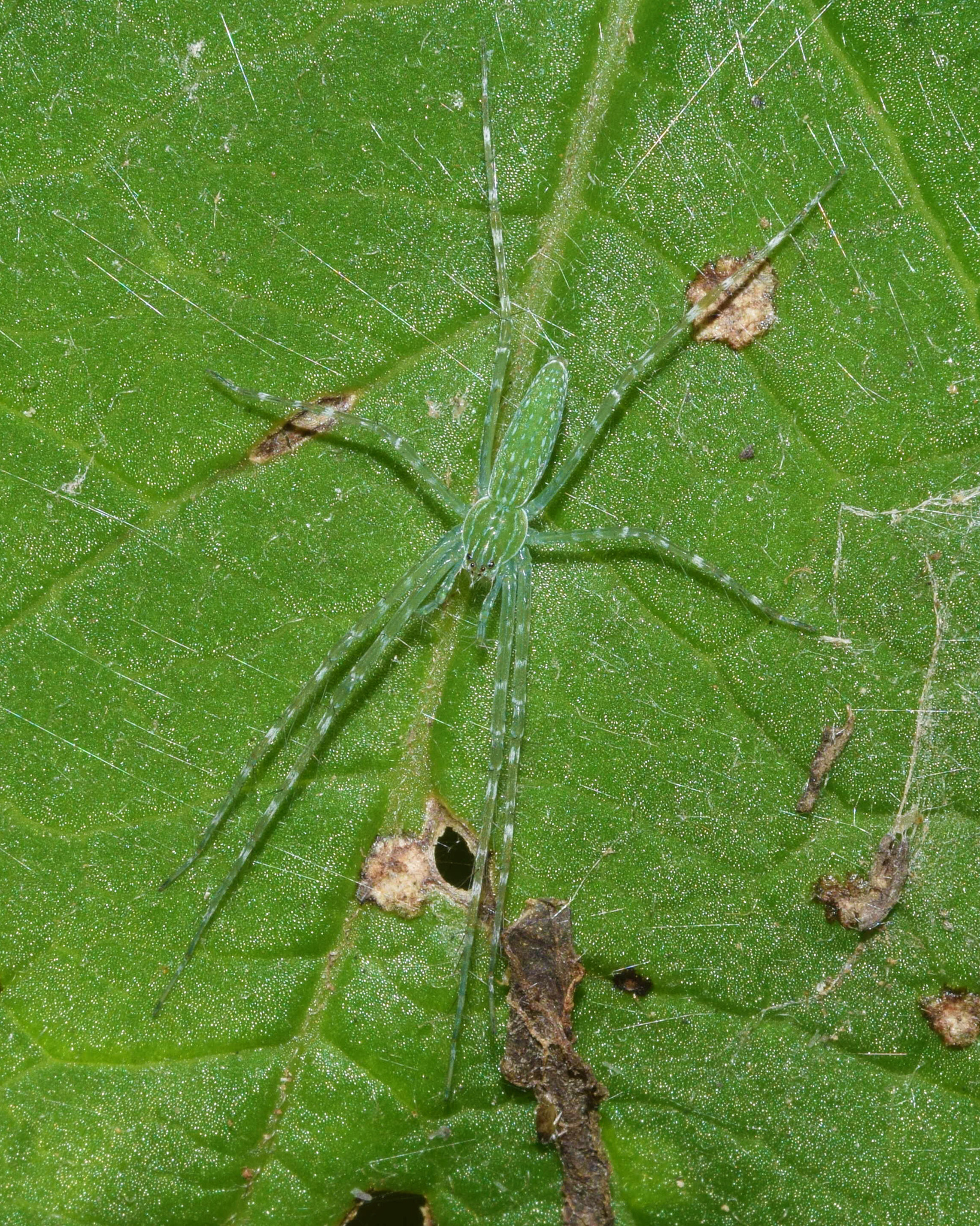
H. tangana

As of October 2025, this genus includes 26 species and one subspecies:

- Hygropoda africana Simon, 1898 – Gabon, Sierra Leone
- Hygropoda albolimbata (Thorell, 1878) – Indonesia (Ambon)
- Hygropoda argentata Zhang, Zhu & Song, 2004 – China, Thailand
- Hygropoda balingkinitanus (Barrion & Litsinger, 1995) – Philippines
- Hygropoda borbonica (Vinson, 1863) – Réunion
- Hygropoda bottrelli (Barrion & Litsinger, 1995) – Philippines
- Hygropoda campanulata Zhang, Zhu & Song, 2004 – China, Thailand
- Hygropoda celebesiana (Strand, 1913) – Indonesia (Sulawesi)
- Hygropoda chandrakantii (Reddy & Patel, 1993) – India
- Hygropoda dolomedes (Doleschall, 1859) – Indonesia (Ambon)
- Hygropoda gracilis (Thorell, 1891) – India (Nicobar Is.)
- Hygropoda higenaga (Kishida, 1936) – China, Taiwan, Japan
- Hygropoda linearis (Simon, 1903) – Madagascar
- Hygropoda lineata (Thorell, 1881) – Indonesia to Australia
- Hygropoda longimana (Stoliczka, 1869) – Bangladesh, Malaysia
- Hygropoda longitarsis (Thorell, 1877) – Vietnam, Indonesia (Sulawesi)
  - H. l. fasciata (Thorell, 1877) – Indonesia (Sulawesi)
- Hygropoda macropus Pocock, 1897 – Indonesia (Moluccas)
- Hygropoda medogensis Lu, Wang & Zhang, 2023 – China
- Hygropoda menglun Zhang, Zhu & Song, 2004 – China
- Hygropoda procera Thorell, 1895 – Myanmar
- Hygropoda prognatha Thorell, 1895 – Singapore (type species)
- Hygropoda sikkimus (Tikader, 1970) – India (mainland, Andaman Is.)
- Hygropoda subannulipes Strand, 1911 – Indonesia (Aru Is.)
- Hygropoda taeniata Wang, 1993 – China
- Hygropoda tangana (Roewer, 1955) – Kenya, Tanzania, South Africa, Madagascar
- Hygropoda yunnan Zhang, Zhu & Song, 2004 – China, Thailand, Laos
