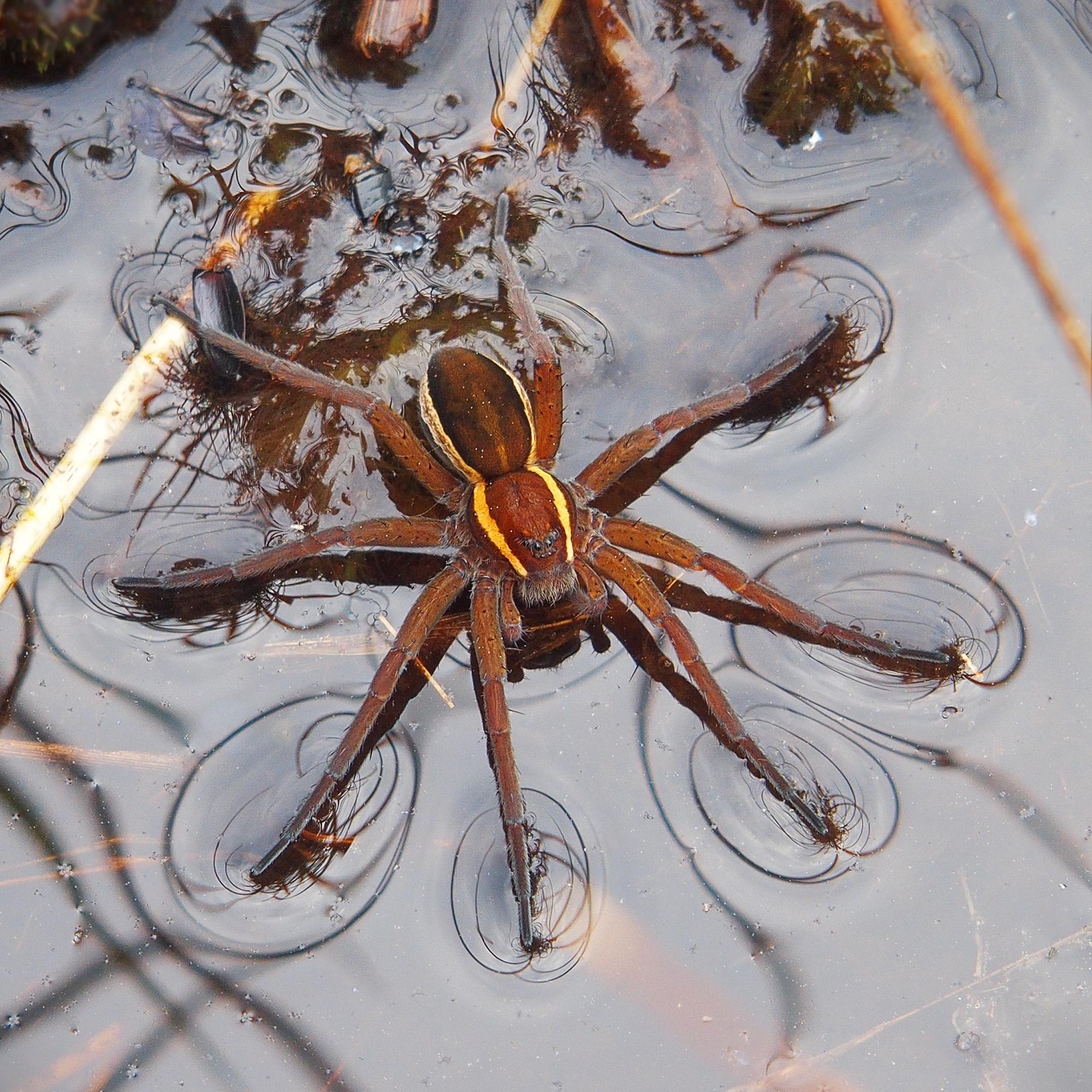
- Dolomedes fimbriatus
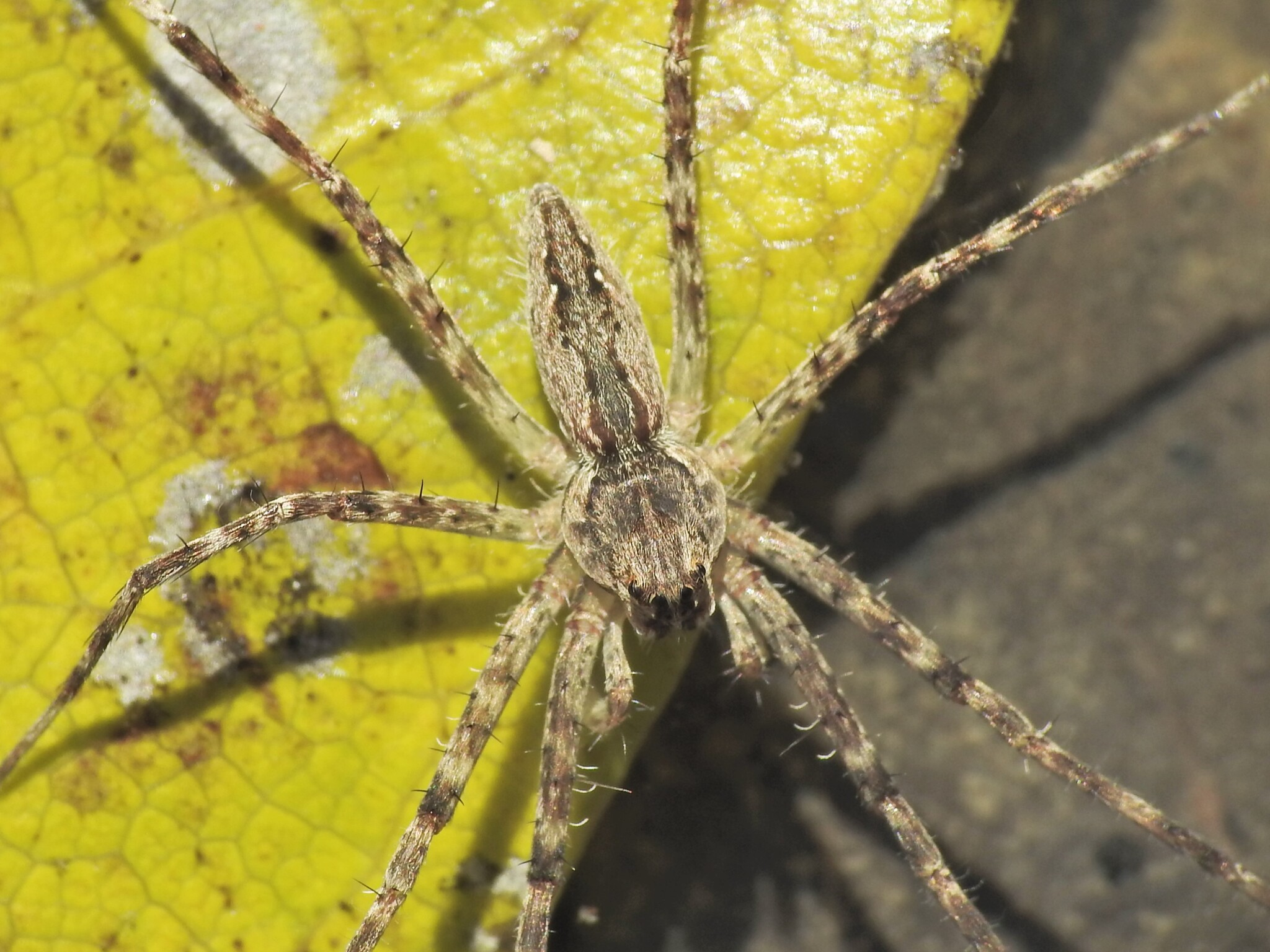
- female Megadolomedes trux

Scientific classification
- Kingdom: Animalia
- Phylum: Arthropoda
- Subphylum: Chelicerata
- Class: Arachnida
- Order: Araneae
- Infraorder: Araneomorphae
- Family: Dolomedidae; Simon, 1876

Diversity
- 7 genera, 128 species
- blue: reported countries (WSC) green: observation hotspots (iNaturalist)

Synonyms
- Bradystichidae Simon, 1884

= Dolomedidae =

Family of spiders

Dolomedidae is a family of spiders comprising seven genera formerly part of the family Pisauridae. It includes the genus Dolomedes, known commonly as raft spiders, and its close relatives.

== Taxonomy ==
The family was first circumscribed by Eugène Simon in 1876, but was later made synonymous with Pisauridae and Bradystichidae. It was restored to family level and redefined in 2025 based on a phylogenetic study of Pisauridae that found the family to be paraphyletic. Morphologically, they differ from pisaurids in possessing a subterminal lateral apophysis below the fulcrum in males, and in females by possessing small, rounded accessory bulbs.

== Genera ==
As of October 2025, this family includes seven genera and 128 species:

- Bradystichus Simon, 1884 – New Caledonia
- Caledomedes Raven & Hebron, 2018 – New Caledonia
- Dolomedes Latreille, 1804 – Africa, Asia, Russia, Cuba, North America, Oceania, South America, Mariana Islands, Marquesas Islands, New Hebrides?
- Mangromedes Raven, 2018 – Australia
- Megadolomedes Davies & Raven, 1980 – Australia
- Ornodolomedes Raven & Hebron, 2018 – Australia
- Tasmomedes Raven, 2018 – Australia
