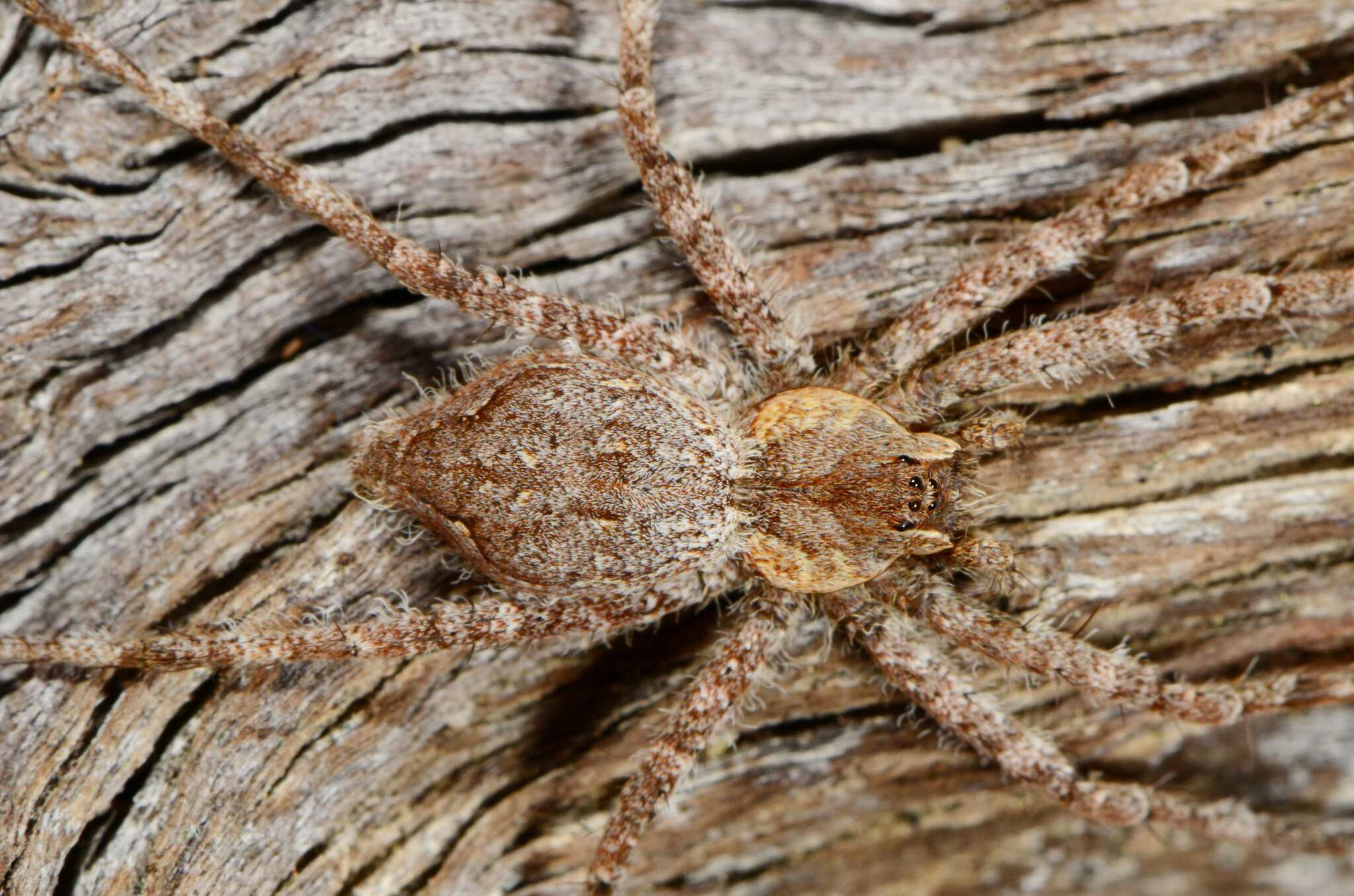
- female
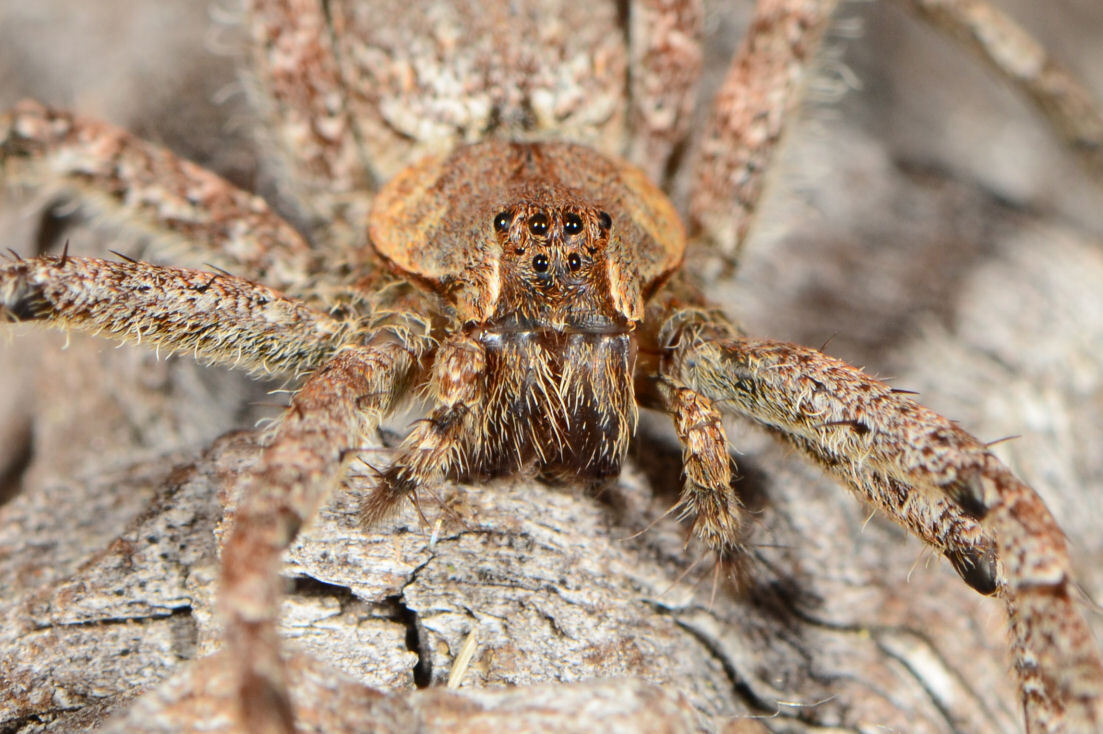
- female

Scientific classification
- Kingdom: Animalia
- Phylum: Arthropoda
- Subphylum: Chelicerata
- Class: Arachnida
- Order: Araneae
- Infraorder: Araneomorphae
- Family: Pisauridae
- Genus: Nilus
- Species: N. rossi

Binomial name
- Nilus rossi (Pocock, 1902)

Synonyms
- Thalassius rossii Pocock, 1902; Thalassius harpago Roewer, 1955; Thalassius kolosvaryi Roewer, 1955

= Nilus rossi =

White-bum Nilus fish-eating spider

Species of spider

Nilus rossi is a spider species in the family Pisauridae. The species is commonly known as the white-bum Nilus fish-eating spider.

== Distribution ==
Nilus rossi has been recorded from the Democratic Republic of the Congo, Zimbabwe, Mozambique, and South Africa.

In South Africa, the species has been sampled from KwaZulu-Natal, Limpopo, Mpumalanga, and North West.

== Habitat and ecology ==
These are free-running ground dwellers associated with fresh waters and known to catch small fish, tadpoles, and large aquatic invertebrates including insect nymphs or larvae. They can be found at fresh-water pools and have been sampled from the Savanna biome at altitudes ranging from 7 to 1343 m.

== Description ==
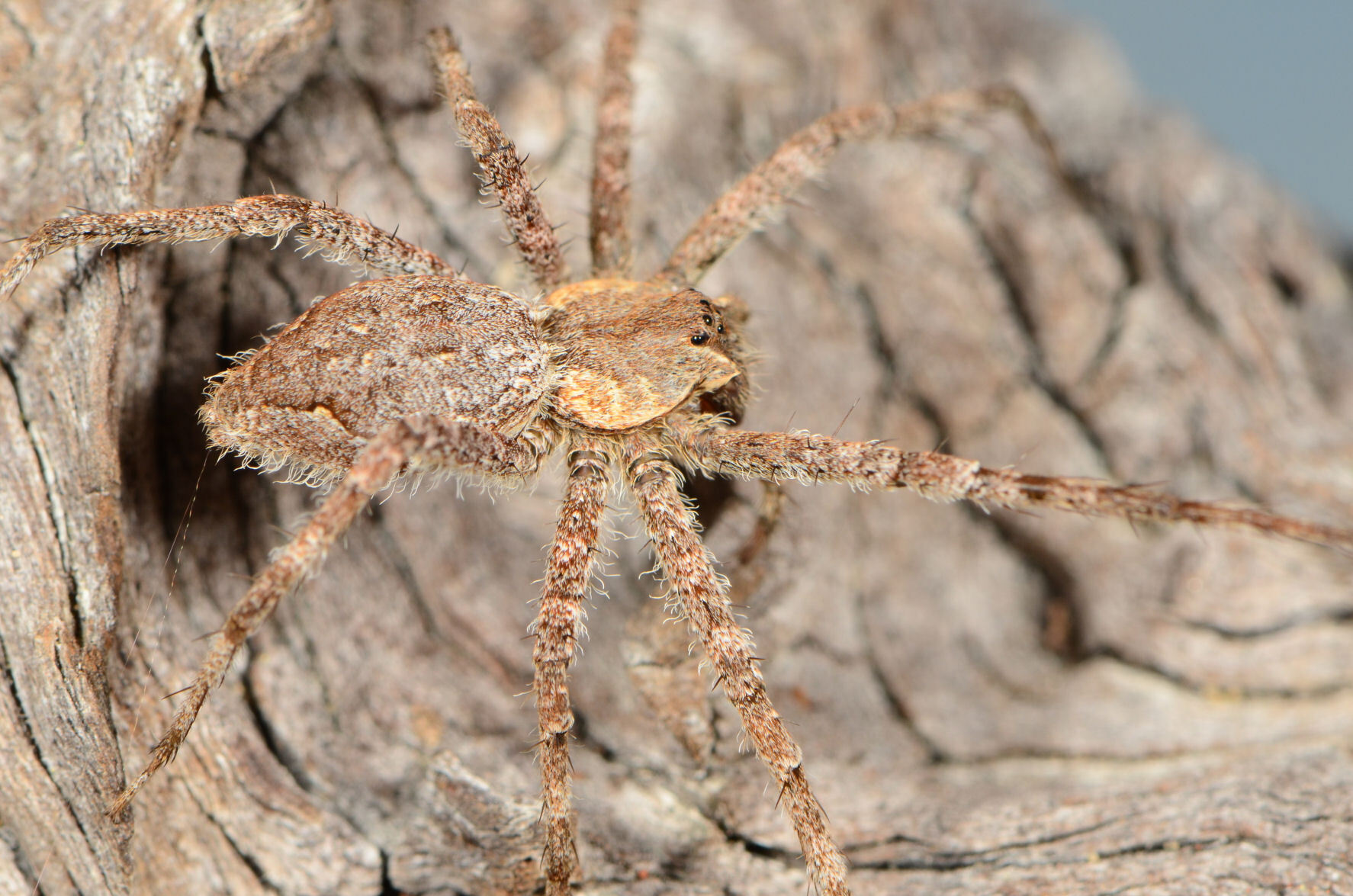
female

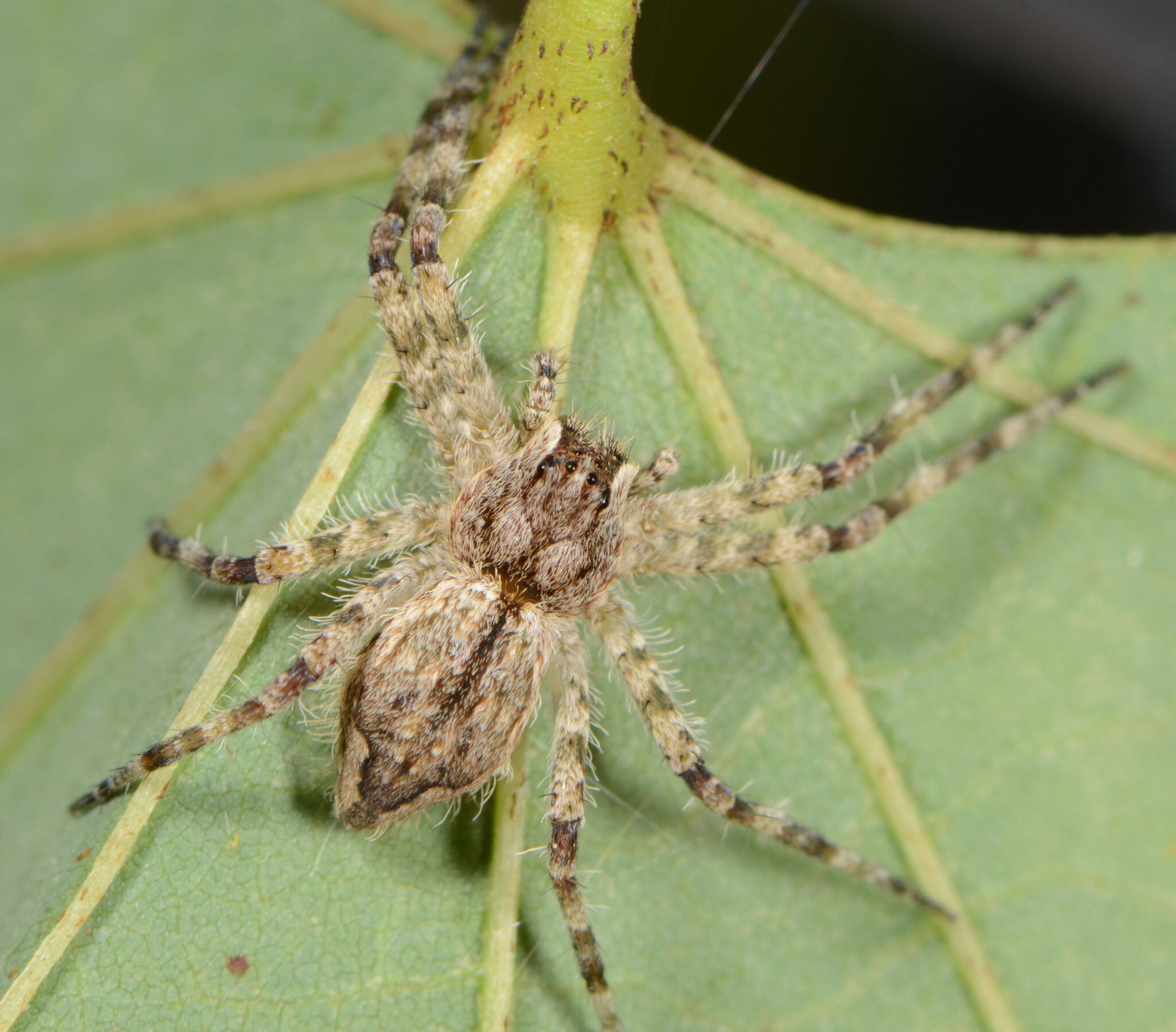
juvenile female

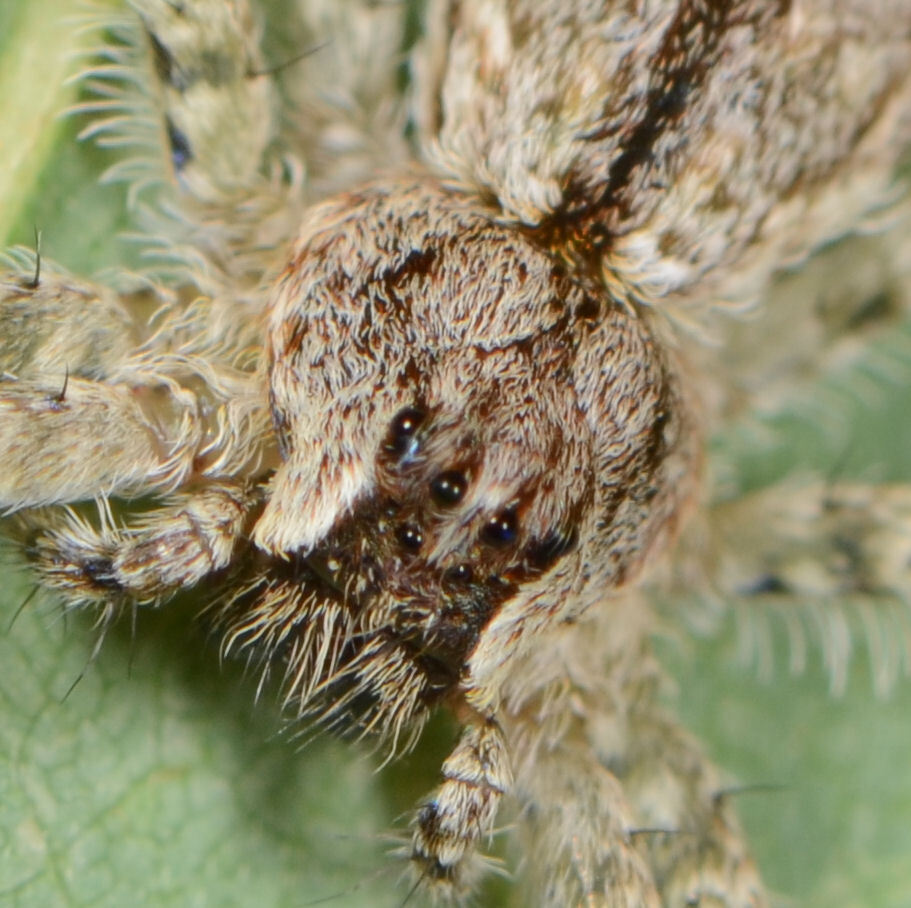
juvenile female

== Conservation ==
Nilus rossi is listed as Least Concern due to its wide geographical range. The species is protected in Kruger National Park, Ndumo Game Reserve, and Legalameetse Nature Reserve. There are no significant threats to the species.

== Taxonomy ==
The species was described by Pocock in 1902 from Durban. It was transferred to Nilus by Jäger in 2011, revised by Sierwald in 1987 and is known from both sexes.
