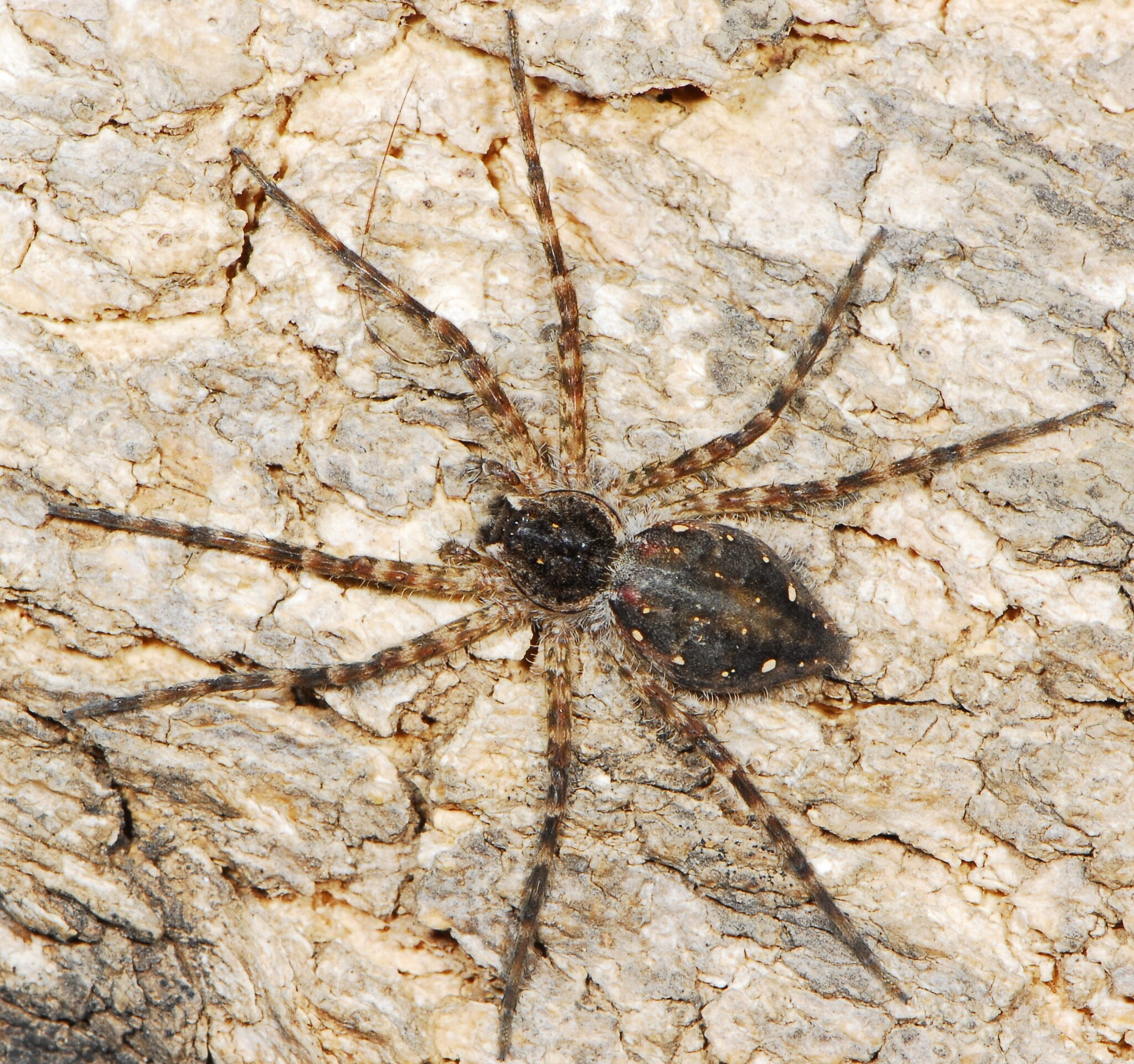
- female
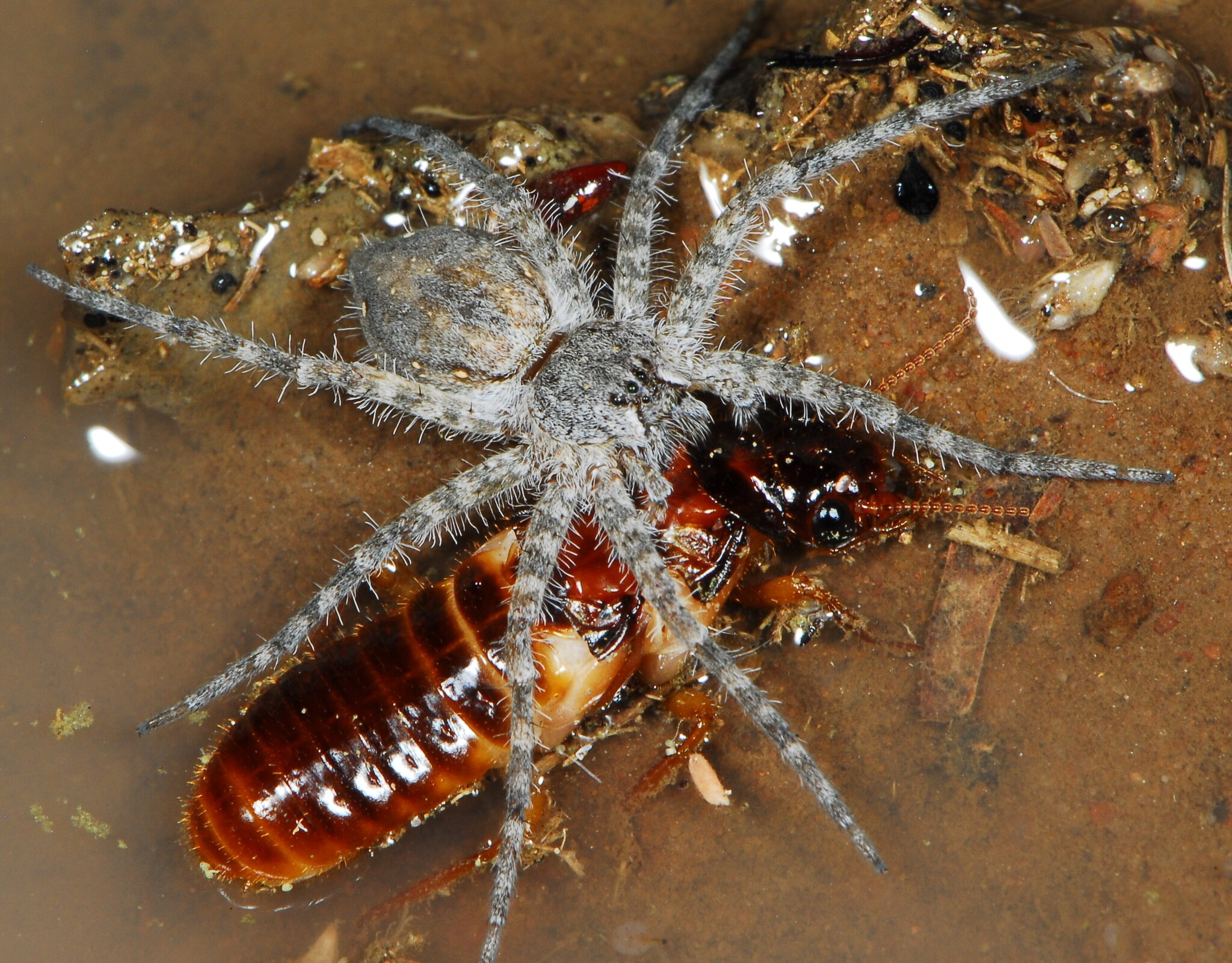
- female

Scientific classification
- Kingdom: Animalia
- Phylum: Arthropoda
- Subphylum: Chelicerata
- Class: Arachnida
- Order: Araneae
- Infraorder: Araneomorphae
- Family: Pisauridae
- Genus: Nilus
- Species: N. radiatolineatus

Binomial name
- Nilus radiatolineatus Strand, 1906

Synonyms
- Thalassius radiatolineatus Strand, 1906; T. brunneopictus Caporiacco, 1940; T. marfieldi Roewer, 1955; T. kästneri Roewer, 1955; T. kaestneri Roewer, 1955

= Nilus radiatolineatus =

Nilus fish-eating spider

Species of spider

Nilus radiatolineatus is a spider species in the family Pisauridae. The species is commonly known as the Nilus fish-eating spider.

== Distribution ==
Nilus radiatolineatus has been recorded from Cameroon, Ethiopia, Democratic Republic of the Congo, Kenya, Namibia, Zimbabwe, South Africa, and Eswatini.

In South Africa, the species has been sampled from KwaZulu-Natal, Limpopo, Mpumalanga, Northern Cape, and North West.

== Habitat and ecology ==
They are open-roaming terrestrial creatures that live near freshwater and have been seen to prey on small fish, tadpoles, and large aquatic animals such as insect nymphs. They can be found at fresh-water pools and have been sampled from the Savanna biome at altitudes ranging from 446 to 1712 m.

== Description ==
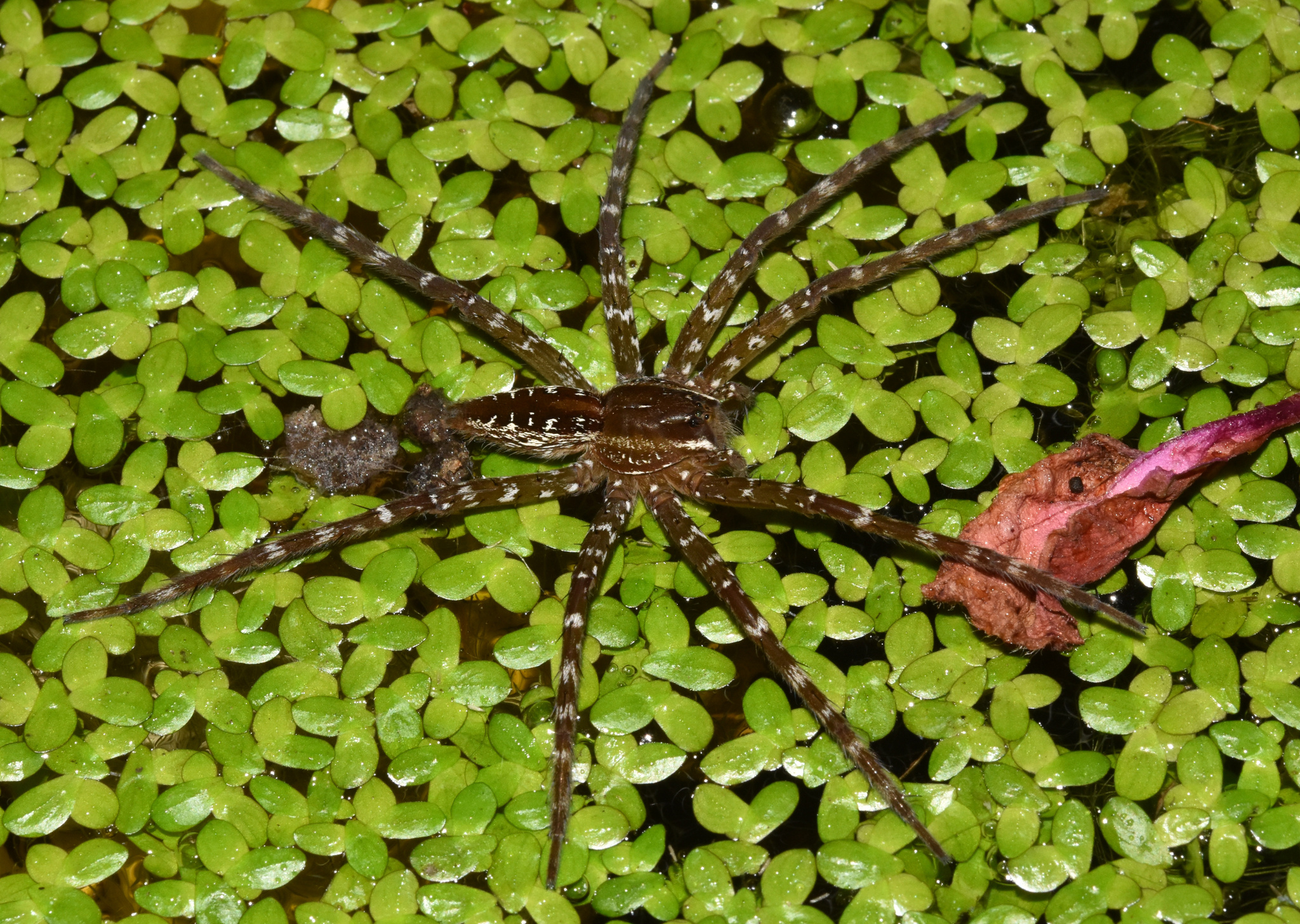

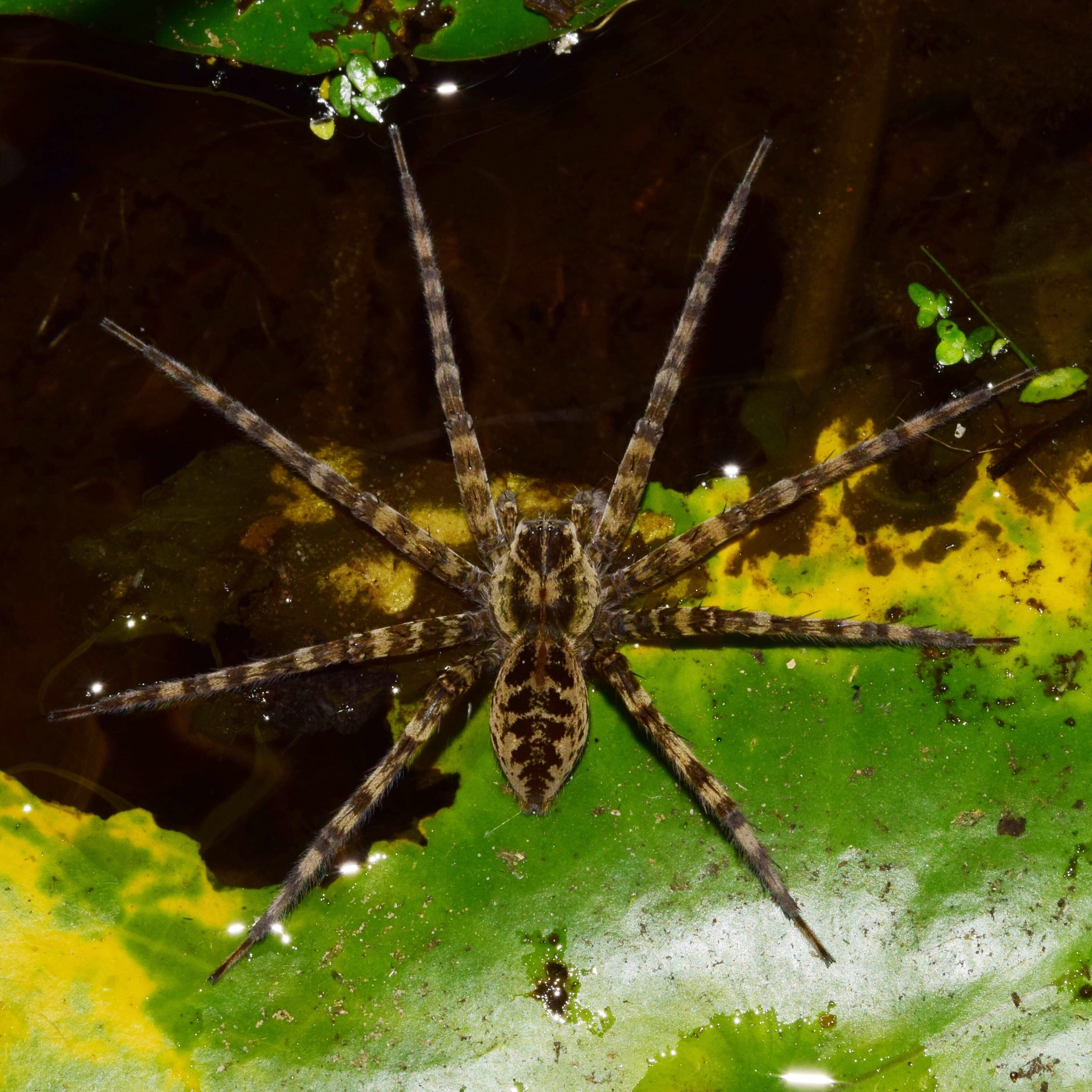

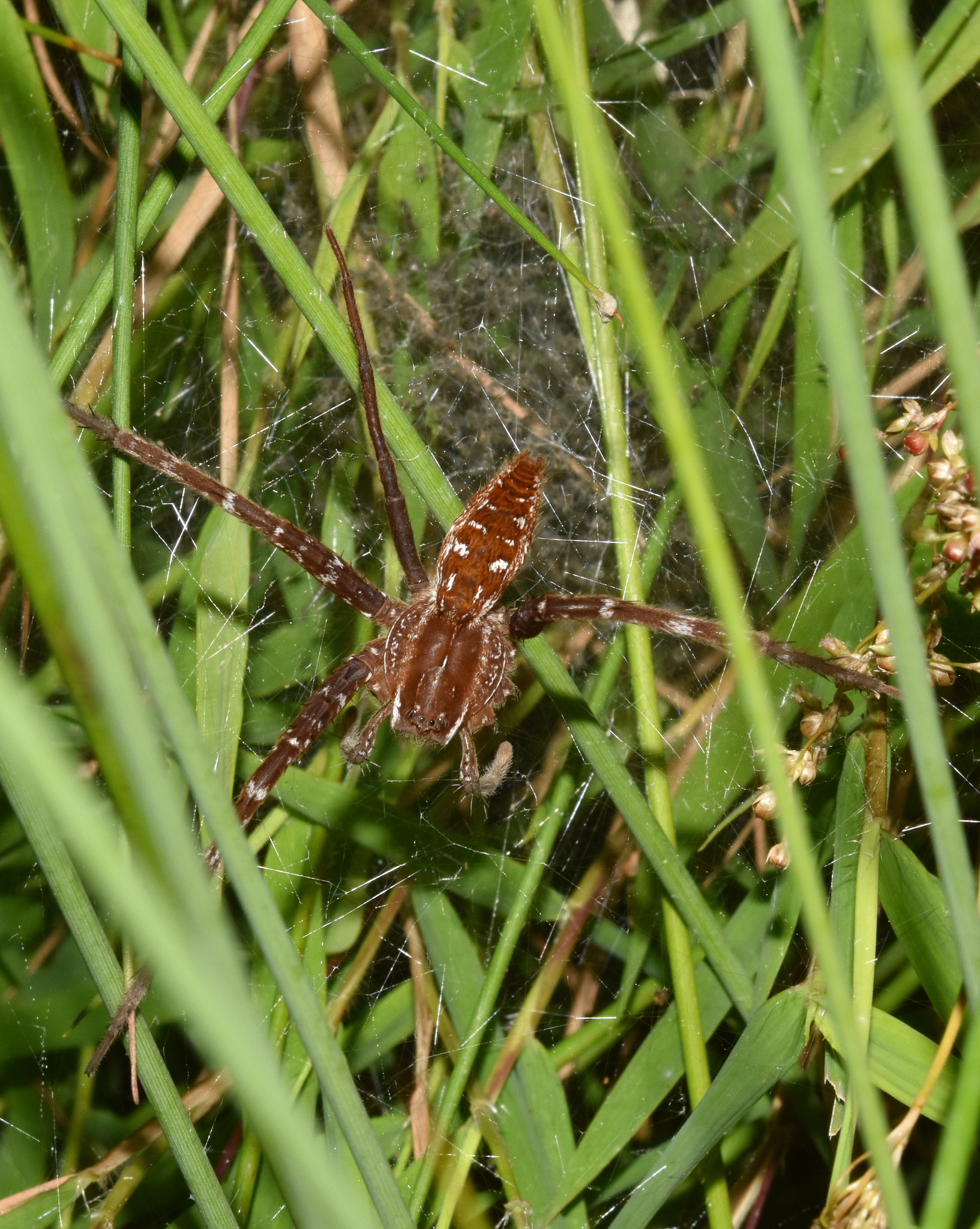

== Conservation ==
Nilus radiatolineatus is listed as Least Concern due to its wide geographical range. The species is protected in Pilanesberg Nature Reserve. There are no significant threats to the species.

== Taxonomy ==
The species was described by Strand in 1906 from Ethiopia. It was transferred to Nilus by Jäger in 2011. The species was revised by Sierwald in 1987 and is known from both sexes.
