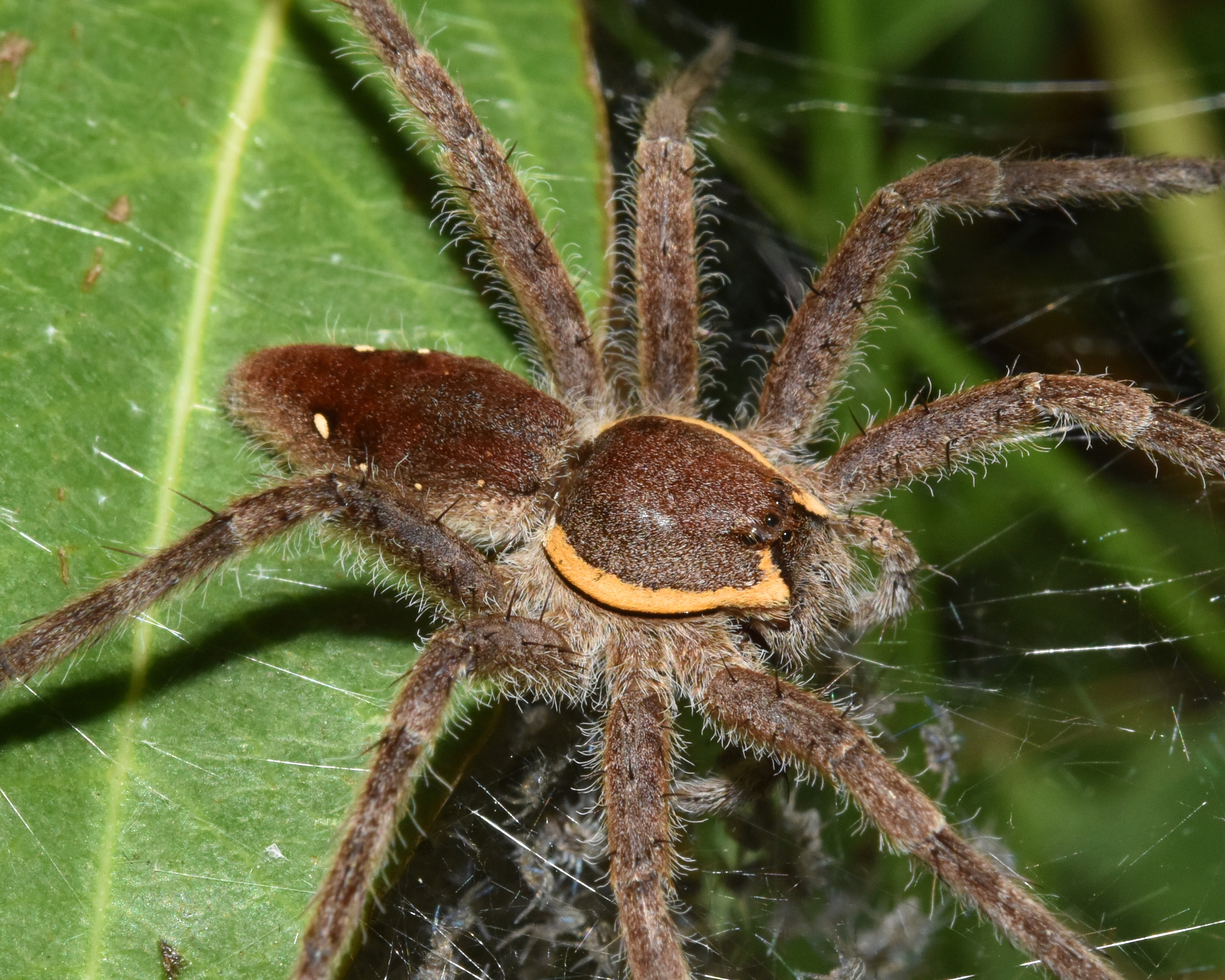
- female N. margaritatus
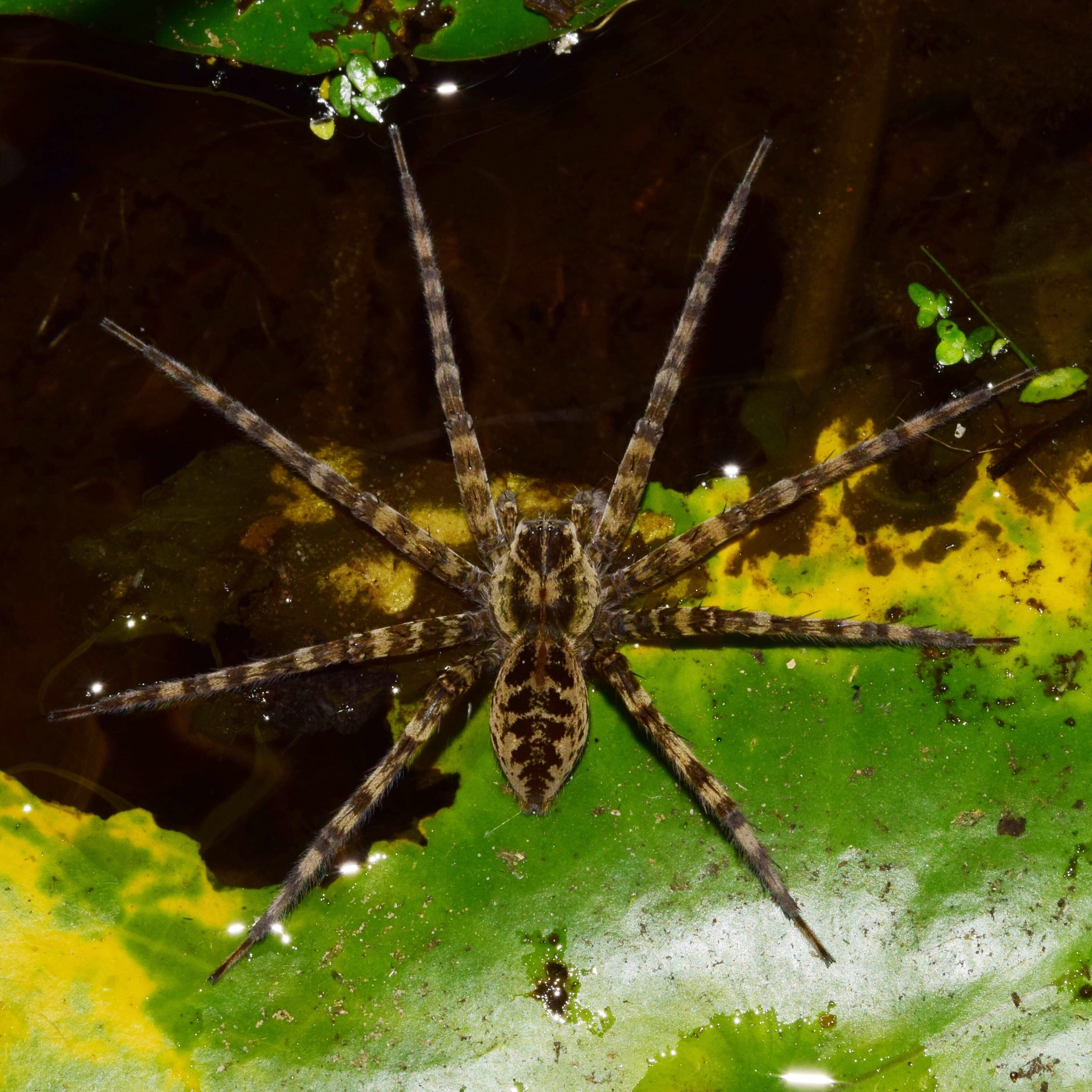
- N. radiolineatus

Scientific classification
- Kingdom: Animalia
- Phylum: Arthropoda
- Subphylum: Chelicerata
- Class: Arachnida
- Order: Araneae
- Infraorder: Araneomorphae
- Family: Pisauridae
- Genus: Nilus; O. Pickard-Cambridge, 1876

Type species
- N. curtus O. Pickard-Cambridge, 1876

Species
- 17, see text

= Nilus (spider) =

Genus of spiders

Nilus is a genus of nursery web spiders that was first described by Octavius Pickard-Cambridge in 1876.

== Distribution ==
Spiders in this genus are found in Asia and Africa.

== Life style ==
These are free-living spiders usually found at the edge of fresh-water ponds, where they prey on fish and small invertebrates.

The female usually carries the egg sac beneath her sternum, held by her chelicerae and pedipalps. Just before the young emerge, the female constructs a framework of silk known as a nursery web, in which she deposits the eggs. After emerging from the egg sac, the young stay in this nursery web before they disperse.

== Description ==
Females range from 11 to 27 mm in total length, while males range from 9 to 18 mm. The colour is cryptic, with the carapace frequently decorated with white longitudinal bands or symmetrical patterns. The carapace is a little longer than wide, with eyes arranged in two rows. The anterior eye row is recurved and slightly shorter than the posterior median eyes.

The carapace usually has broad submarginal bands on each side, positioned as far from the margin as the width of the band and not extending to the margin. The abdomen is oval and tapers towards the back, with the ventral area usually pale.

The legs are relatively long and sometimes slightly laterigrade, with numerous spines and three claws.

== Taxonomy ==
The genus was studied by Sierwald in 1987, 1989, and 1990, and by Jäger in 2011.

== Species ==
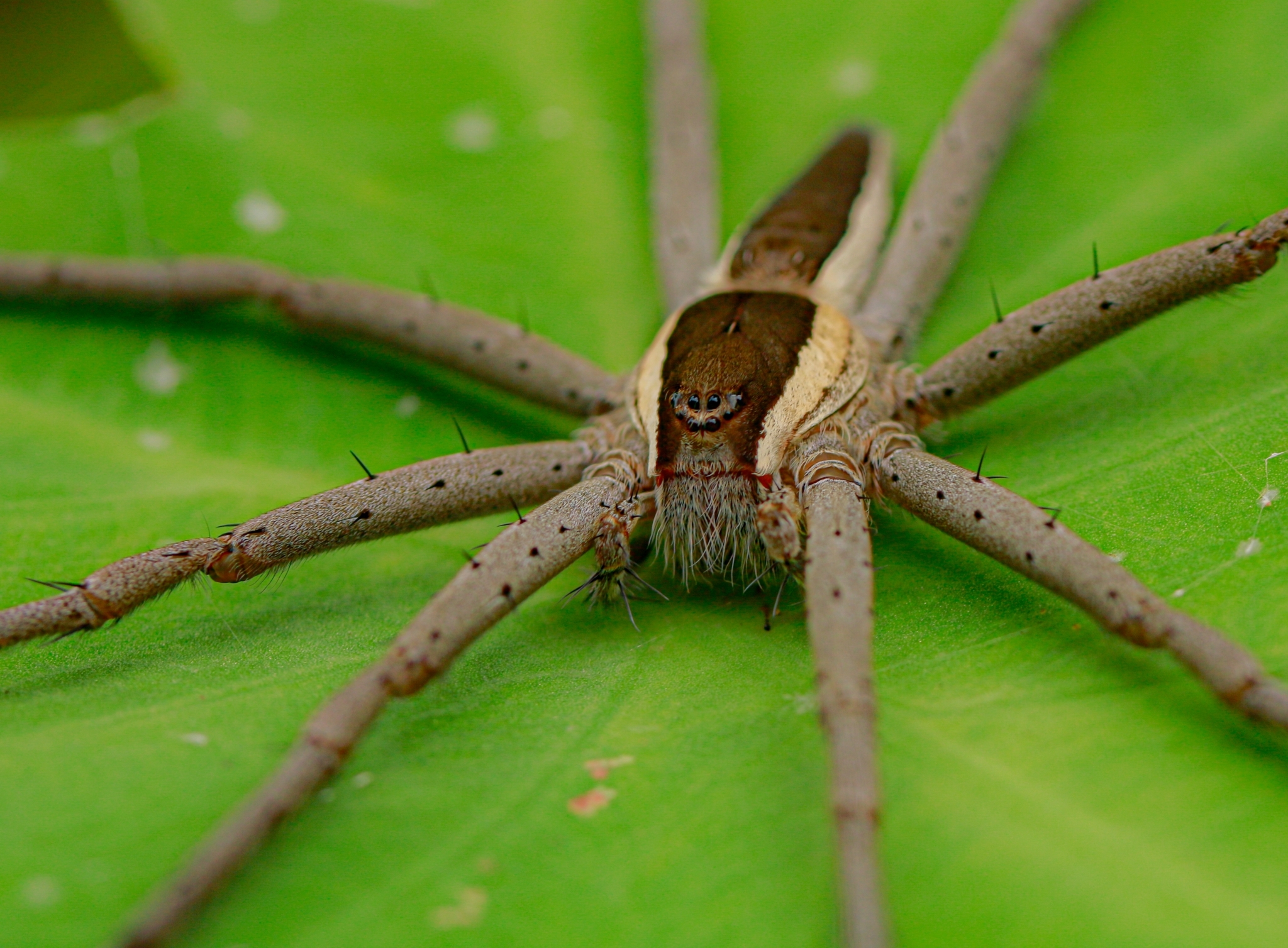
N. albocinctus

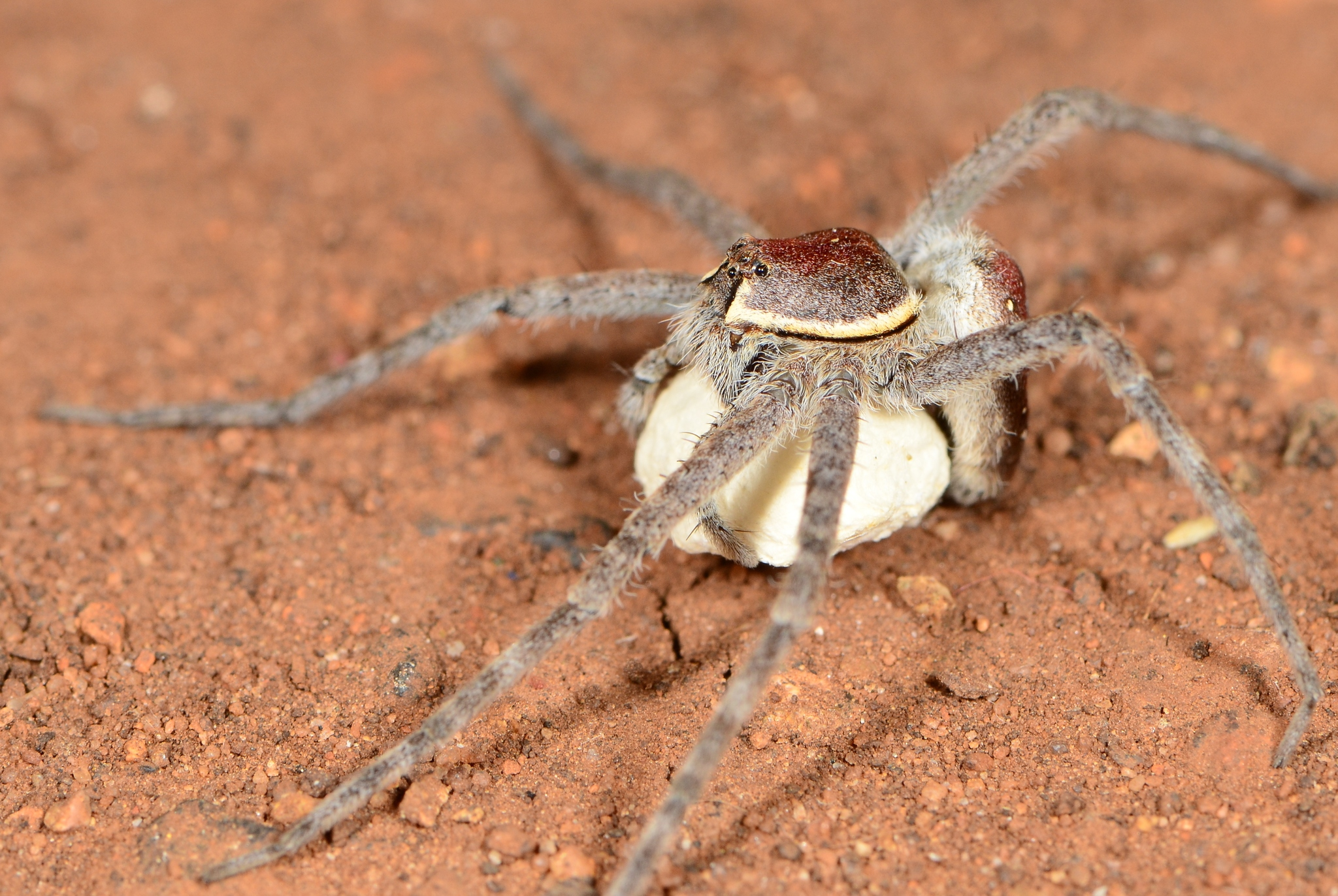
N. curtus

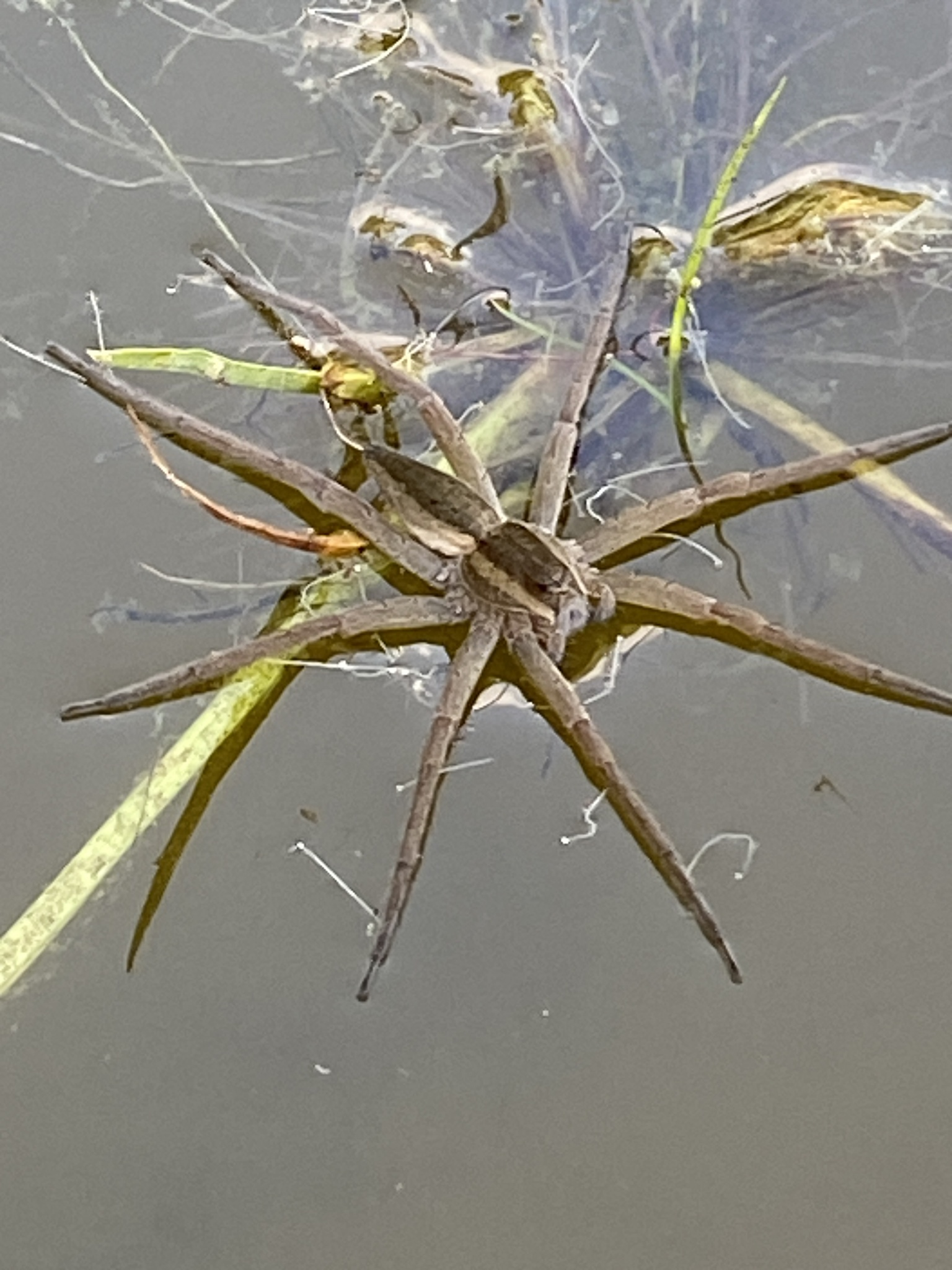
N. massajae

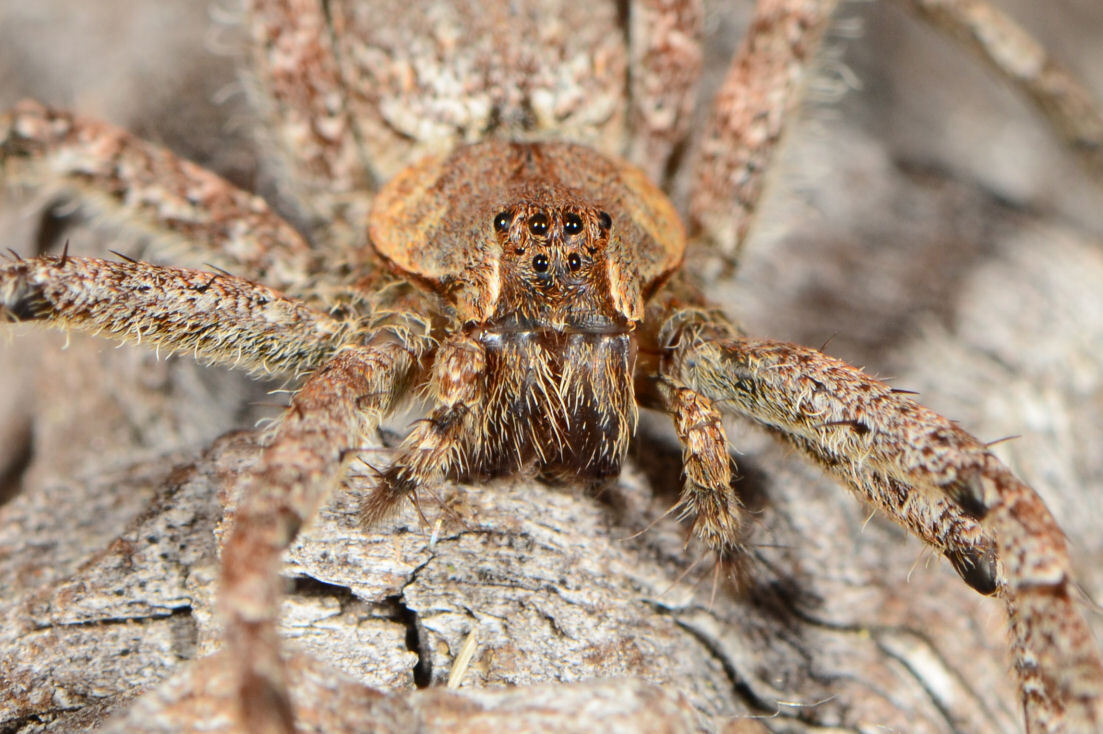
female N. rossi

As of October 2025, this genus includes seventeen species:

- Nilus albocinctus (Doleschall, 1859) – India, Myanmar, Malaysia, Indonesia, Philippines
- Nilus curtus O. Pickard-Cambridge, 1876 – Egypt, Sub-Saharan Africa (type species)
- Nilus decoratus (Patel & Reddy, 1990) – India
- Nilus esimoni (Sierwald, 1984) – Madagascar
- Nilus jayakari (F. O. Pickard-Cambridge, 1898) – Oman
- Nilus leoninus (Strand, 1916) – Madagascar
- Nilus majungensis (Strand, 1907) – Mayotte, Madagascar
- Nilus margaritatus (Pocock, 1898) – Kenya, Tanzania, Angola, Namibia, Botswana, Mozambique, South Africa, Eswatini
- Nilus massajae (Pavesi, 1883) – Ethiopia, DR Congo, Uganda, Malawi, Namibia, South Africa
- Nilus paralbocinctus (Zhang, Zhu & Song, 2004) – China, Laos
- Nilus phipsoni (F. O. Pickard-Cambridge, 1898) – India, Sri Lanka, Nepal, Myanmar, China, Indonesia (Sumbawa, Lombok)
- Nilus pictus (Simon, 1898) – Cameroon, Equatorial Guinea, Gabon, DR Congo
- Nilus pseudoalbocinctus (Sen, Saha & Raychaudhuri, 2010) – India
- Nilus pseudojuvenilis (Sierwald, 1987) – Mozambique
- Nilus radiatolineatus (Strand, 1906) – Cameroon, Ethiopia, DR Congo, Kenya, Namibia, Zimbabwe, South Africa, Eswatini
- Nilus rossi (Pocock, 1902) – DR Congo, Zimbabwe, Mozambique, South Africa
- Nilus rubromaculatus (Thorell, 1899) – Cameroon, Equatorial Guinea, DR Congo
