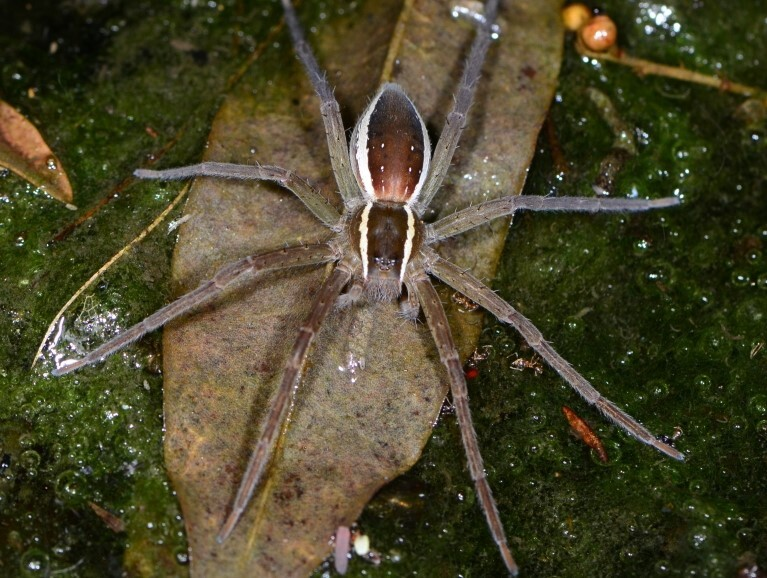
- female
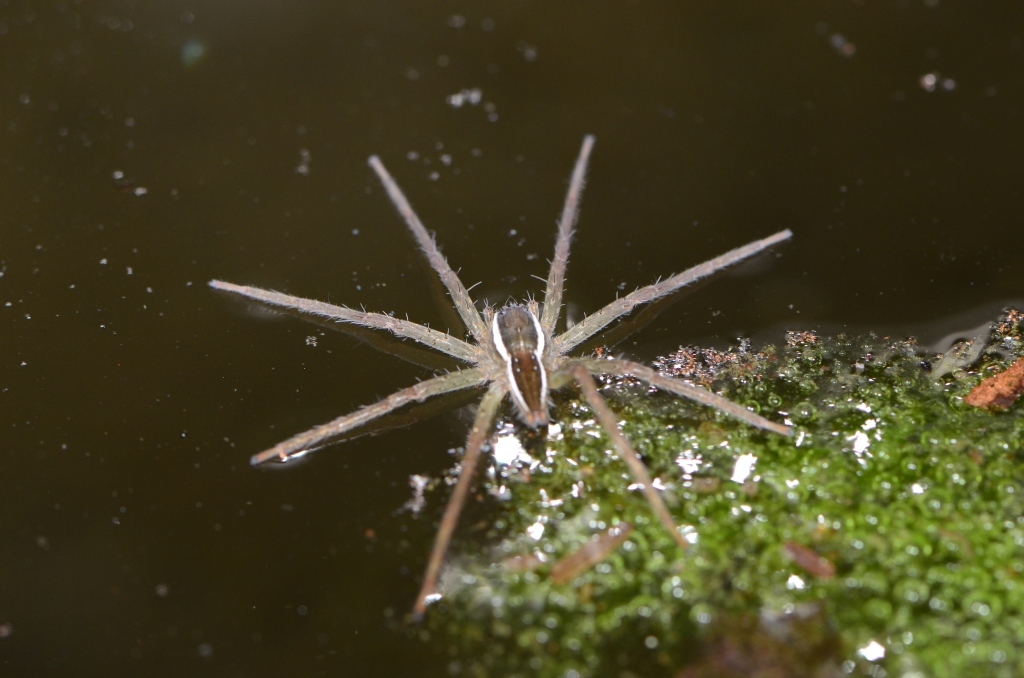
- female

Scientific classification
- Kingdom: Animalia
- Phylum: Arthropoda
- Subphylum: Chelicerata
- Class: Arachnida
- Order: Araneae
- Infraorder: Araneomorphae
- Family: Pisauridae
- Genus: Nilus
- Species: N. massajae

Binomial name
- Nilus massajae (Pavesi, 1883)

Synonyms
- Dolomedes massajae Pavesi, 1883; Thalassius massajae Strand, 1907; T. gaerdesi Roewer, 1955; T. mubaleus Roewer, 1955

= Nilus massajae =

Massajae Nilus fish-eating spider

Species of spider

Nilus massajae is a spider species in the family Pisauridae. The species is commonly known as the Massajae Nilus fish-eating spider.

== Distribution ==
Nilus massajae has been recorded from Ethiopia, Democratic Republic of the Congo, Uganda, Malawi, Namibia, and South Africa.

In South Africa, the species has been sampled from Eastern Cape, KwaZulu-Natal, Limpopo, Mpumalanga, and Western Cape.

== Habitat and ecology ==
These are free-running ground dwellers associated with fresh waters and known to catch small fish, tadpoles, and large aquatic invertebrates including insect nymphs or larvae.

They can be found at fresh-water pools and have been sampled from the Fynbos, Forest, Grassland, and Savanna biomes at altitudes ranging from 2 to 1467 m.

== Description ==
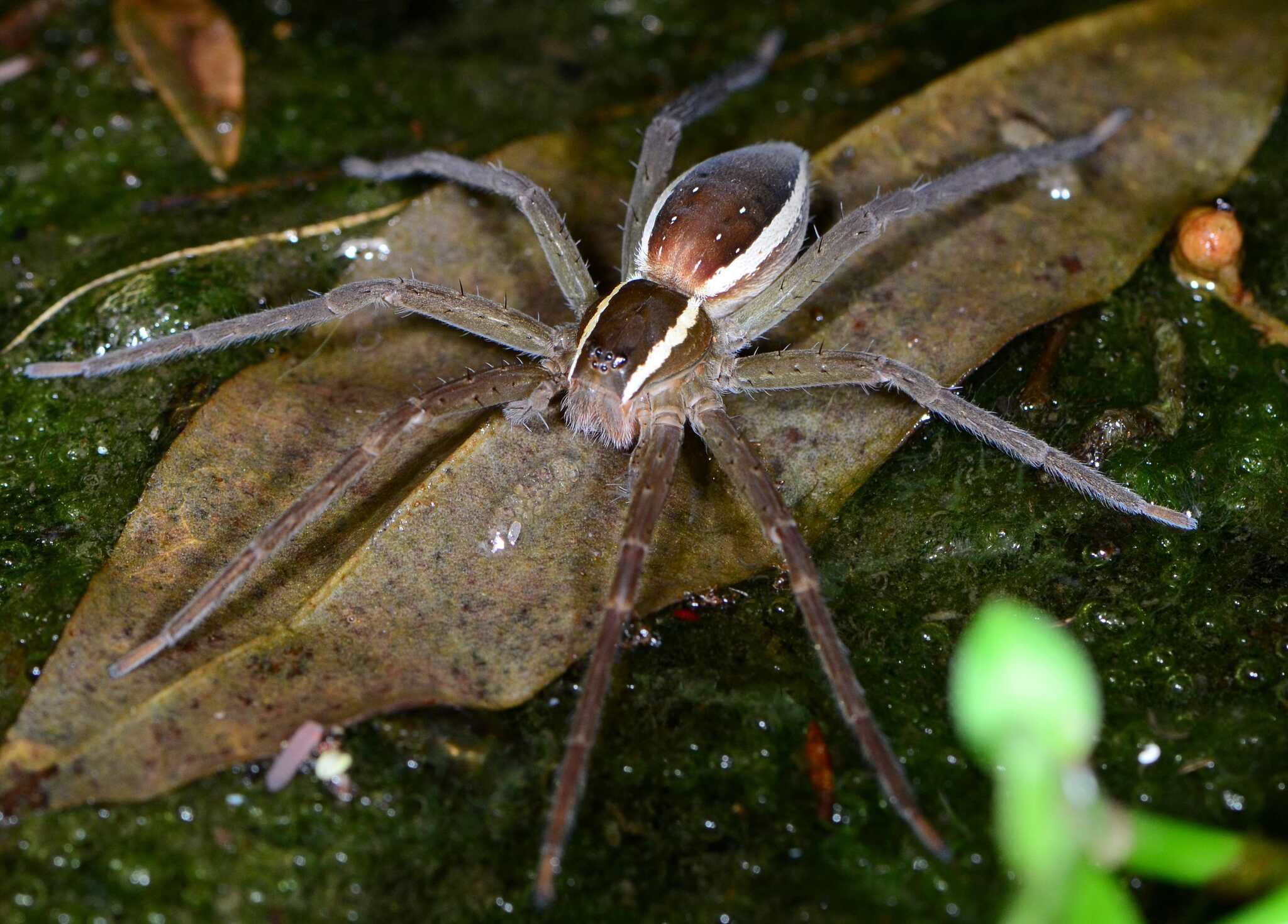
female

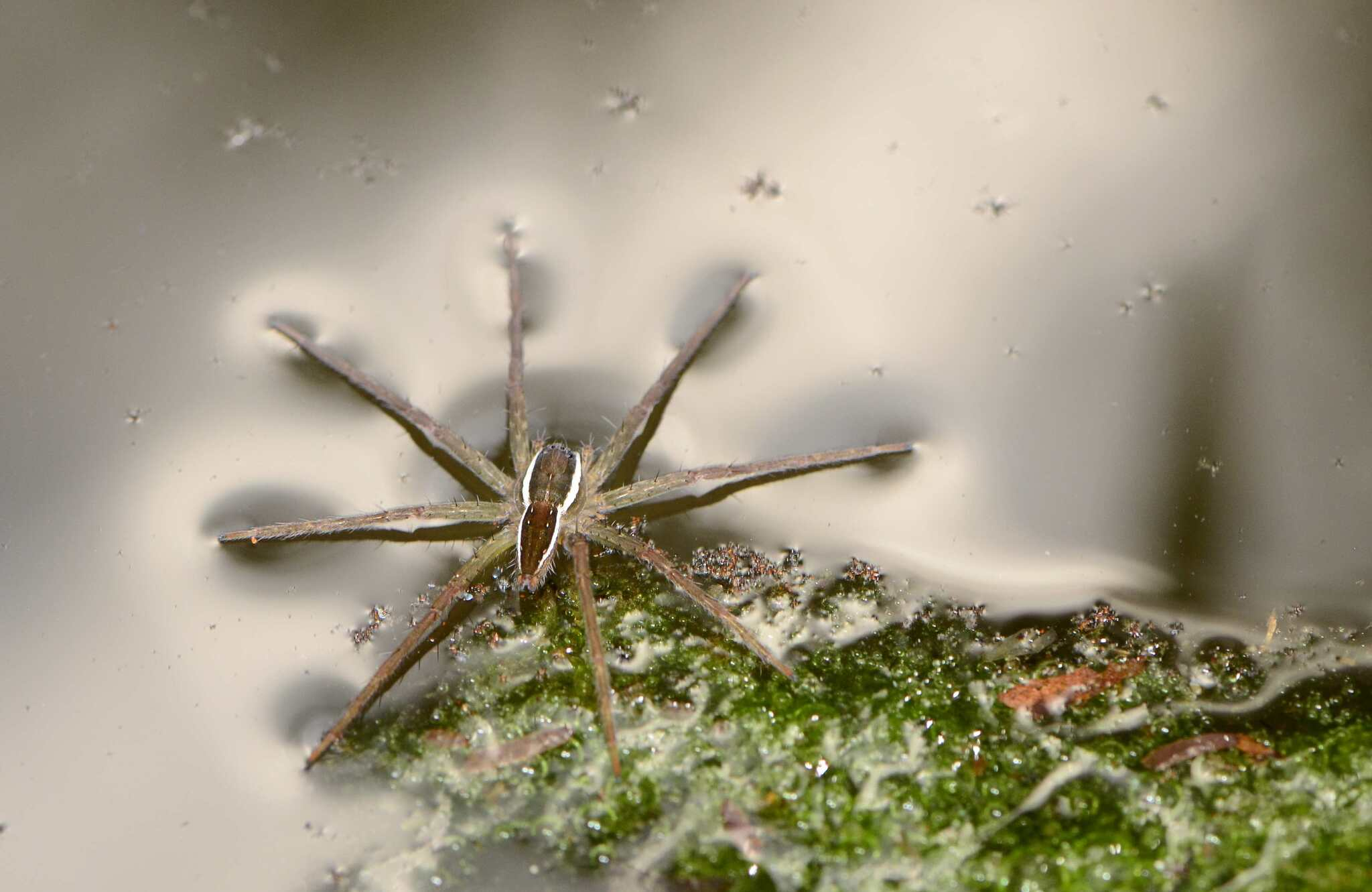
female

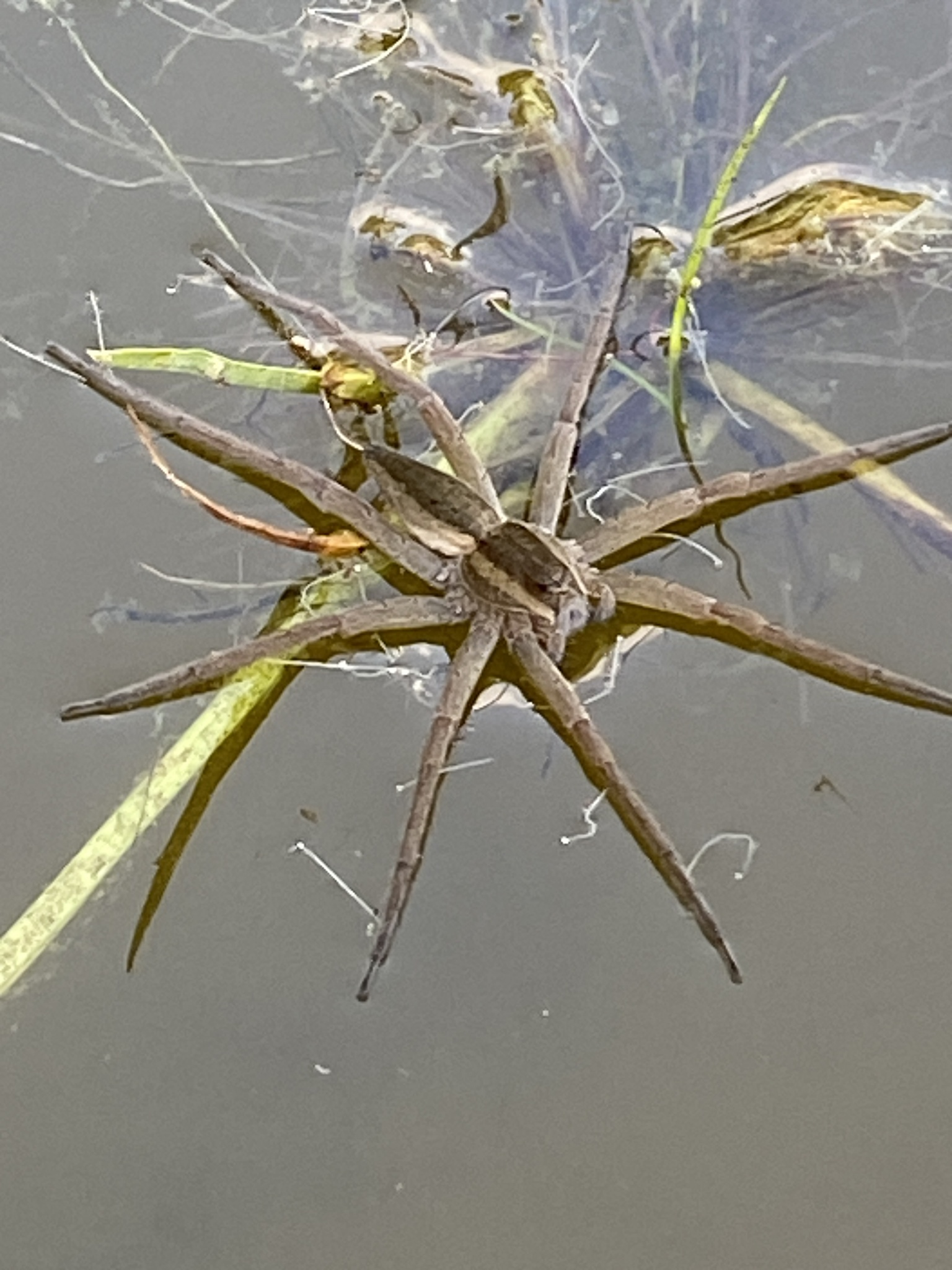

== Conservation ==
Nilus massajae is listed as Least Concern due to its wide geographical range. The species is protected in Kwelera Nature Reserve, Hluleka Nature Reserve, Blouberg Nature Reserve, Goudveld State Forest, and Groenefontein Nature Reserve. There are no significant threats to the species.

== Taxonomy ==
The species was originally described by Pavesi in 1883 as Dolomedes massajae from Ethiopia. It was transferred to Nilus by Jäger in 2011. The species was revised by Sierwald in 1987 and is known from both sexes.
