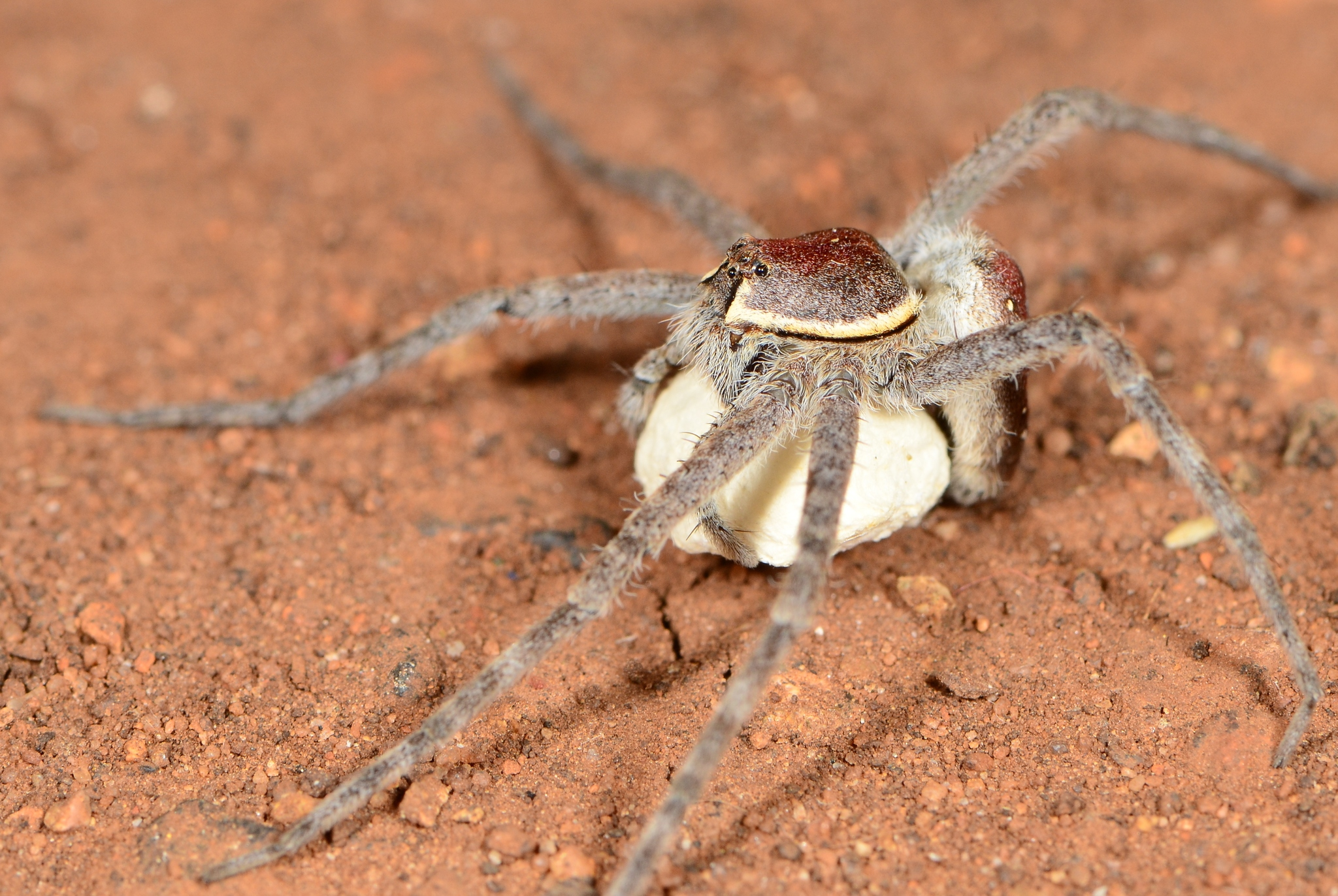
- female with egg sac
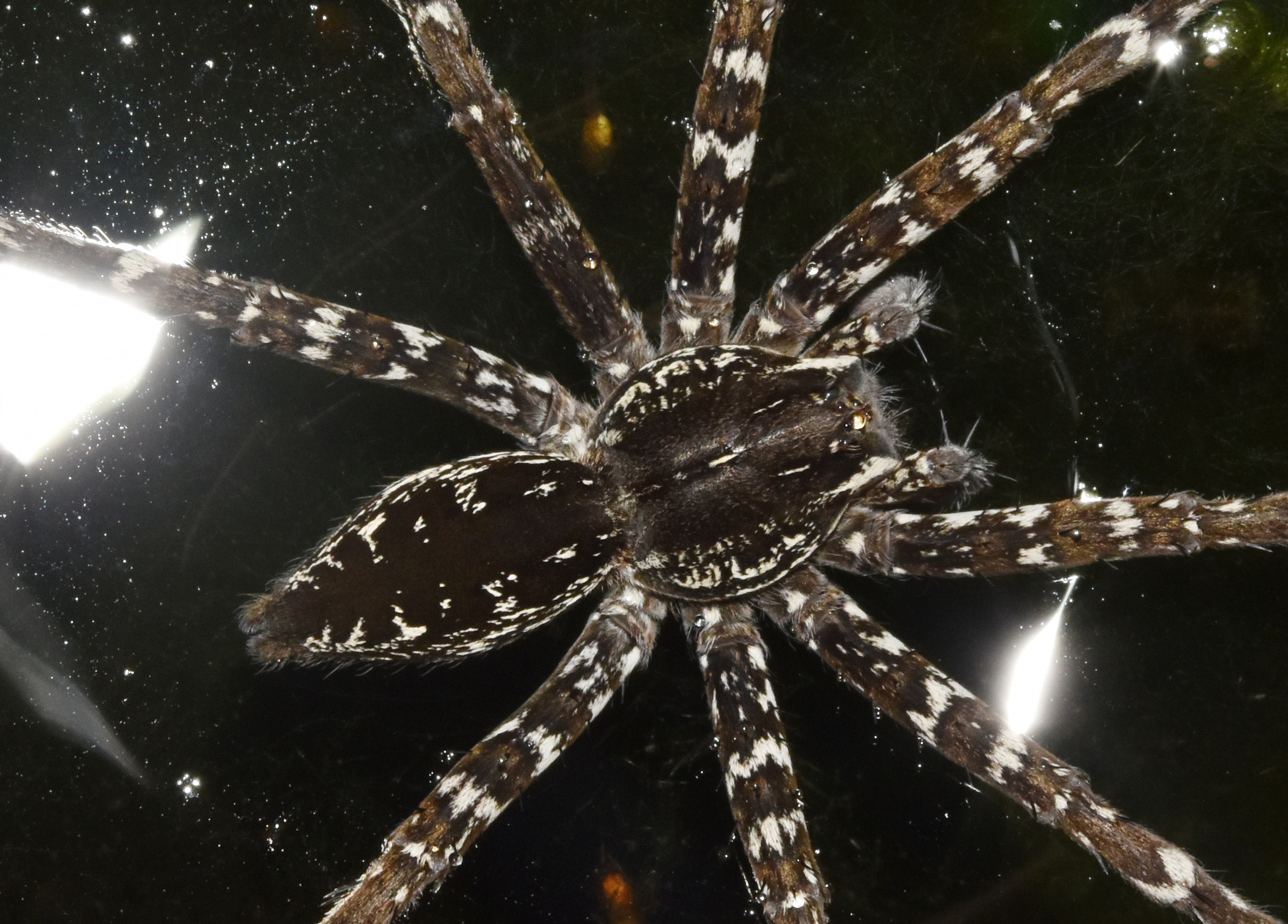
- female?

Scientific classification
- Kingdom: Animalia
- Phylum: Arthropoda
- Subphylum: Chelicerata
- Class: Arachnida
- Order: Araneae
- Infraorder: Araneomorphae
- Family: Pisauridae
- Genus: Nilus
- Species: N. curtus

Binomial name
- Nilus curtus O. Pickard-Cambridge, 1876

Synonyms
- Nilus curtus synonyms: Ctenus spinosissimus Karsch, 1879; Titurius spinosissimus Simon, 1884; T. spinosissimus Simon, 1891; T. unicolor Simon, 1897; T. spenceri F. O. Pickard-Cambridge, 1898; T. inornatus Pocock, 1900; T. auratus Pocock, 1900; T. leucostictus Pocock, 1900; T. batesi Pocock, 1900; T. leonensis Pocock, 1900; T. regalis Pocock, 1900; T. fulvus Kulczyński, 1901; T. ruwenzoricus Strand, 1913; T. bukobensis Strand, 1913; T. schubotzi Strand, 1913; T. tuckeri Lessert, 1923; Dolomedes ingens Caporiacco, 1939; Dolomedes aethiops Caporiacco, 1939; T. kolosvaryi Caporiacco, 1947; T. poecilis Roewer, 1955; T. straeleni Roewer, 1955; T. wittei Roewer, 1955; T. upembanus Roewer, 1955; T. trifasciatus Roewer, 1955; T. malitiosus Roewer, 1955; T. kazibius Roewer, 1955; T. parallelus Roewer, 1955; T. multimaculatus Roewer, 1955; T. contactus Roewer, 1955; T. lanceolatus Roewer, 1955; T. jaundeus Roewer, 1955; T. alacer Roewer, 1955; T. preussi Roewer, 1955; T. maruanus Roewer, 1955; T. cromei Roewer, 1955; T. albiabundans Roewer, 1955; T. gressorius Roewer, 1955; T. umbrosus Roewer, 1955; T. maculatipes Roewer, 1955; T. biseriatus Roewer, 1955; T. signatus Roewer, 1955; T. mossambicus Roewer, 1955; T. fimbriatus Roewer, 1955

= Nilus curtus =

Spotted Nilus fish-eating spider

Species of spider

Nilus curtus is a spider species in the family Pisauridae. The species is commonly known as the spotted Nilus fish-eating spider.

== Distribution ==
Nilus curtus is widely distributed throughout Africa, including Egypt and Sub-Saharan Africa.

In South Africa, the species has been sampled from Eastern Cape, Free State, KwaZulu-Natal, Limpopo, Mpumalanga, and Western Cape.

== Habitat and ecology ==
These are free-running ground dwellers associated with fresh waters and known to catch small fish, tadpoles, and large aquatic invertebrates including insect nymphs or larvae.

They can be found at fresh-water pools and have been sampled from the Fynbos, Forest, Grassland, and Savanna biomes at altitudes ranging from 15 to 1467 m.

Sierwald reported on the predatory, copulatory, and parental behaviour of this widespread and commonly collected species in the Afrotropical Region.

== Description ==
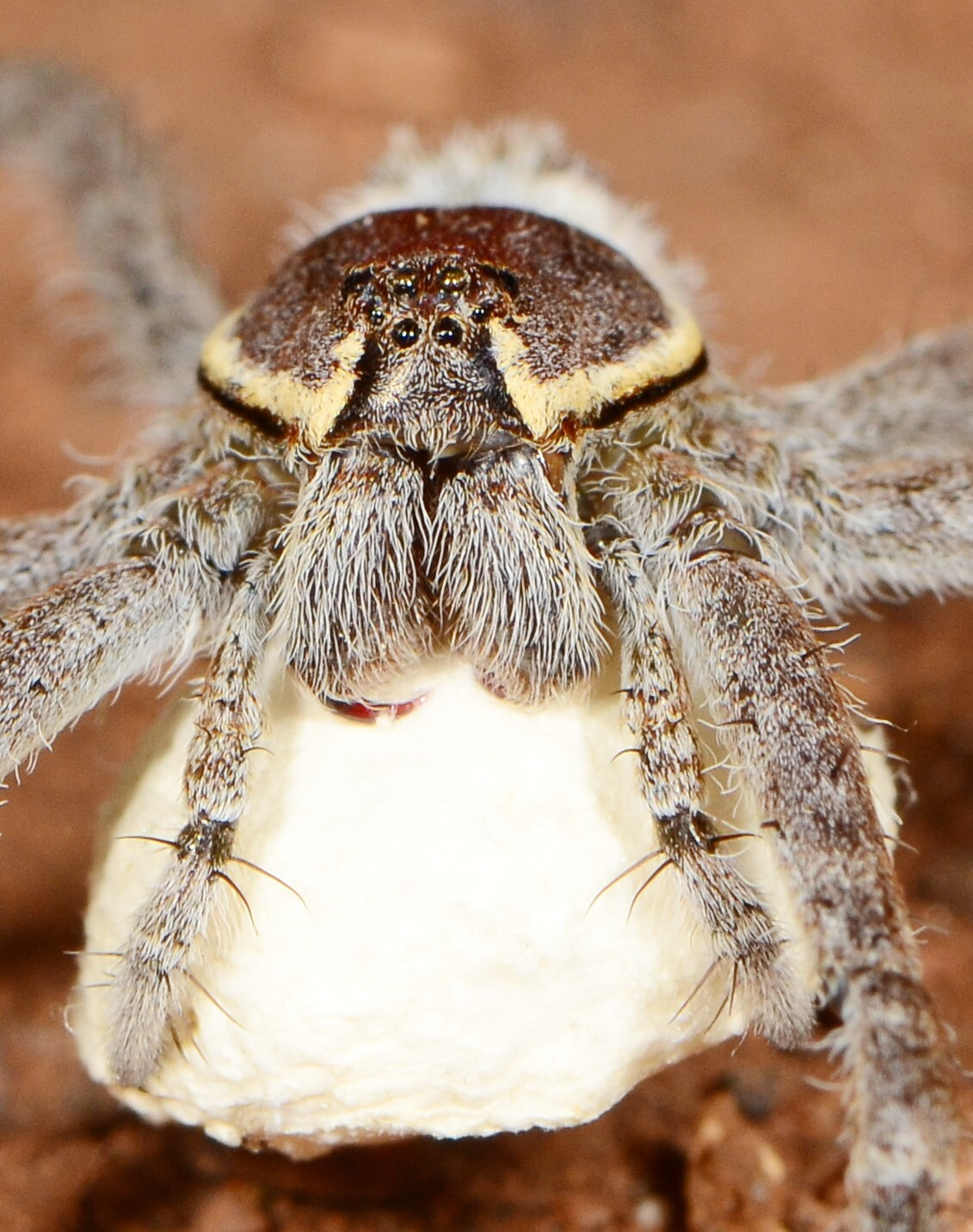
female with egg sac

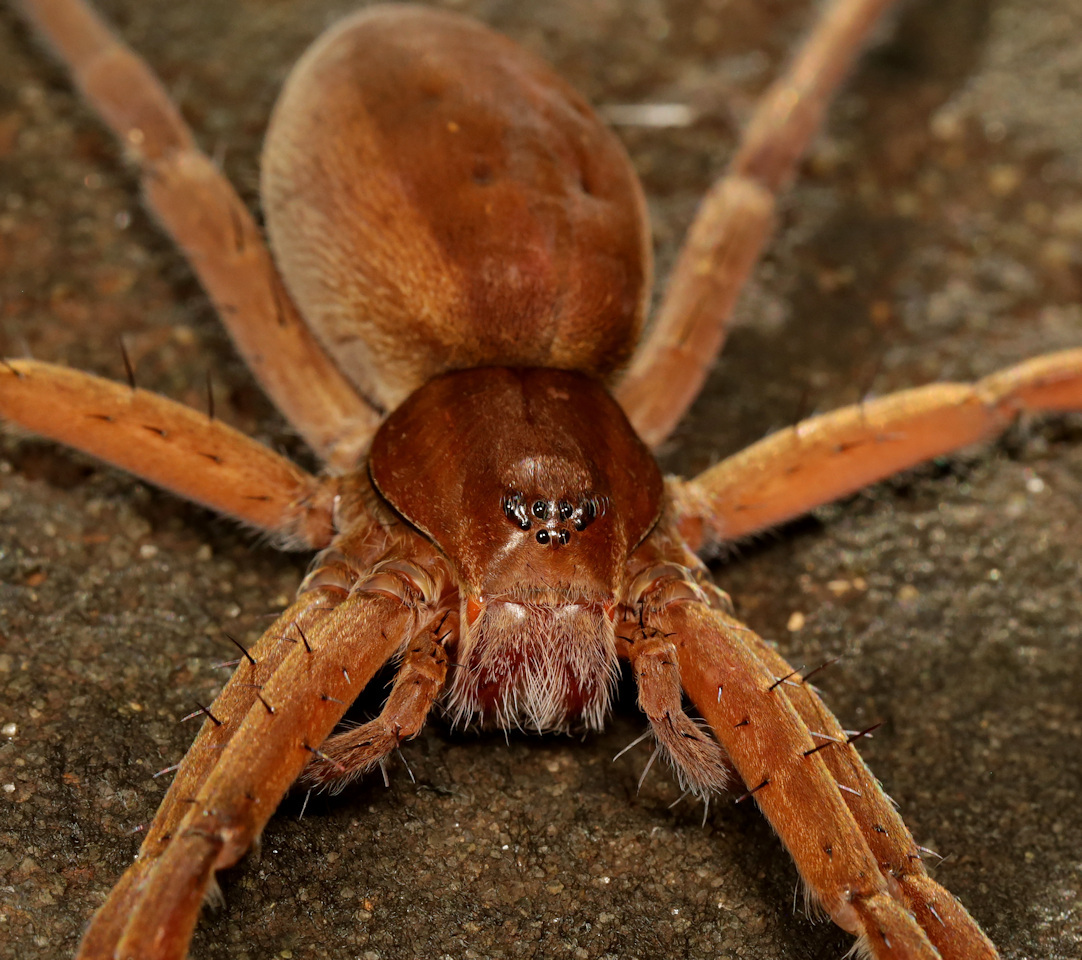

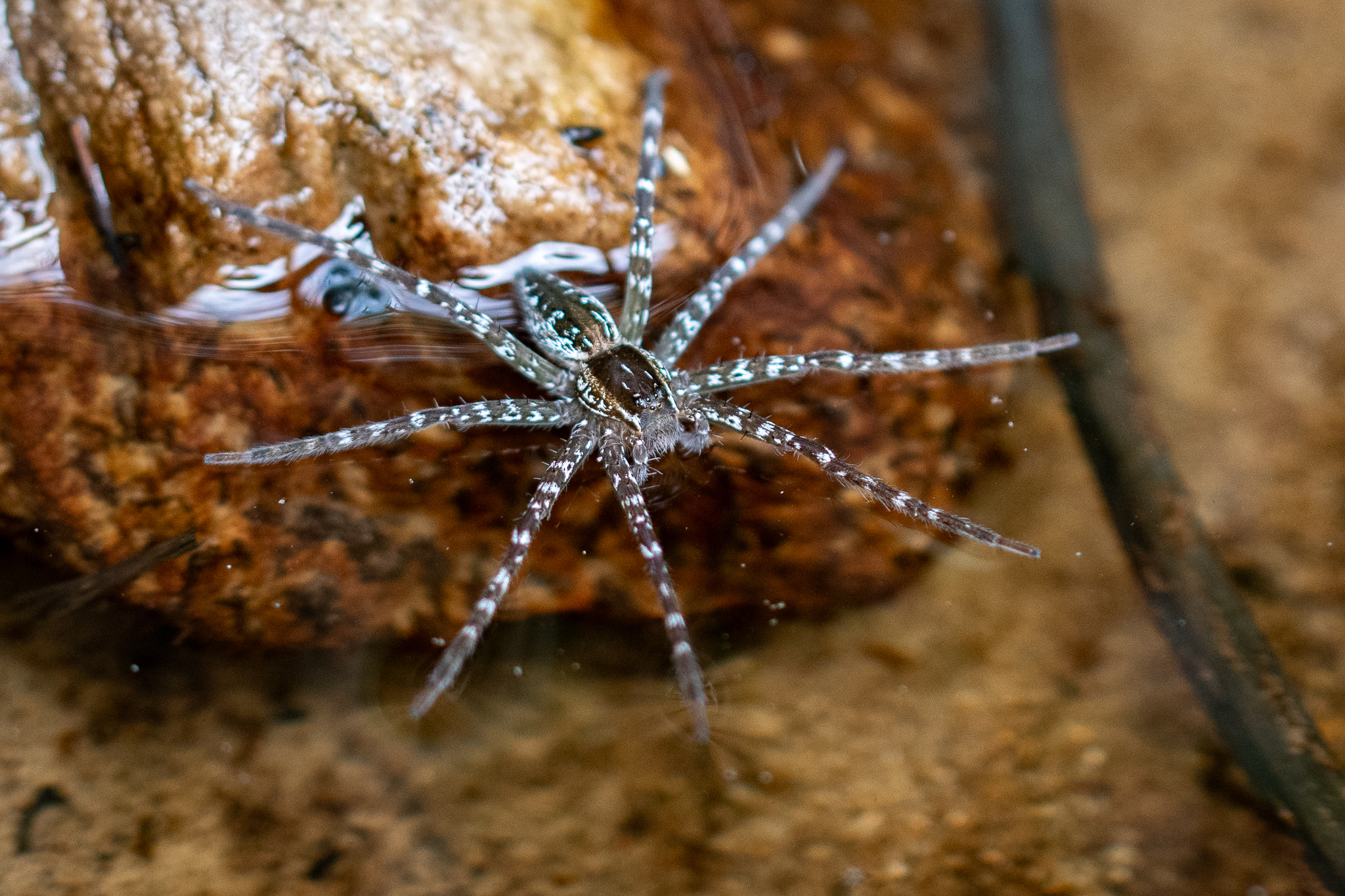

== Conservation ==
Nilus curtus is listed as Least Concern due to its wide geographical range. The species is protected in De Hoop Nature Reserve, Table Mountain National Park, Ndumo Game Reserve, Umgeni Valley Nature Reserve, Mosdene Nature Reserve, Nylsvley Nature Reserve, and Swadini Nature Reserve. There are no significant threats to the species.

== Taxonomy ==
The species was described by O. Pickard-Cambridge in 1876 from Durban in South Africa. It was studied by Sierwald in 1983, 1984, 1987, 1989, and 1990, and by Jäger in 2011. The species was previously known as Thalassius spinosissimus.
