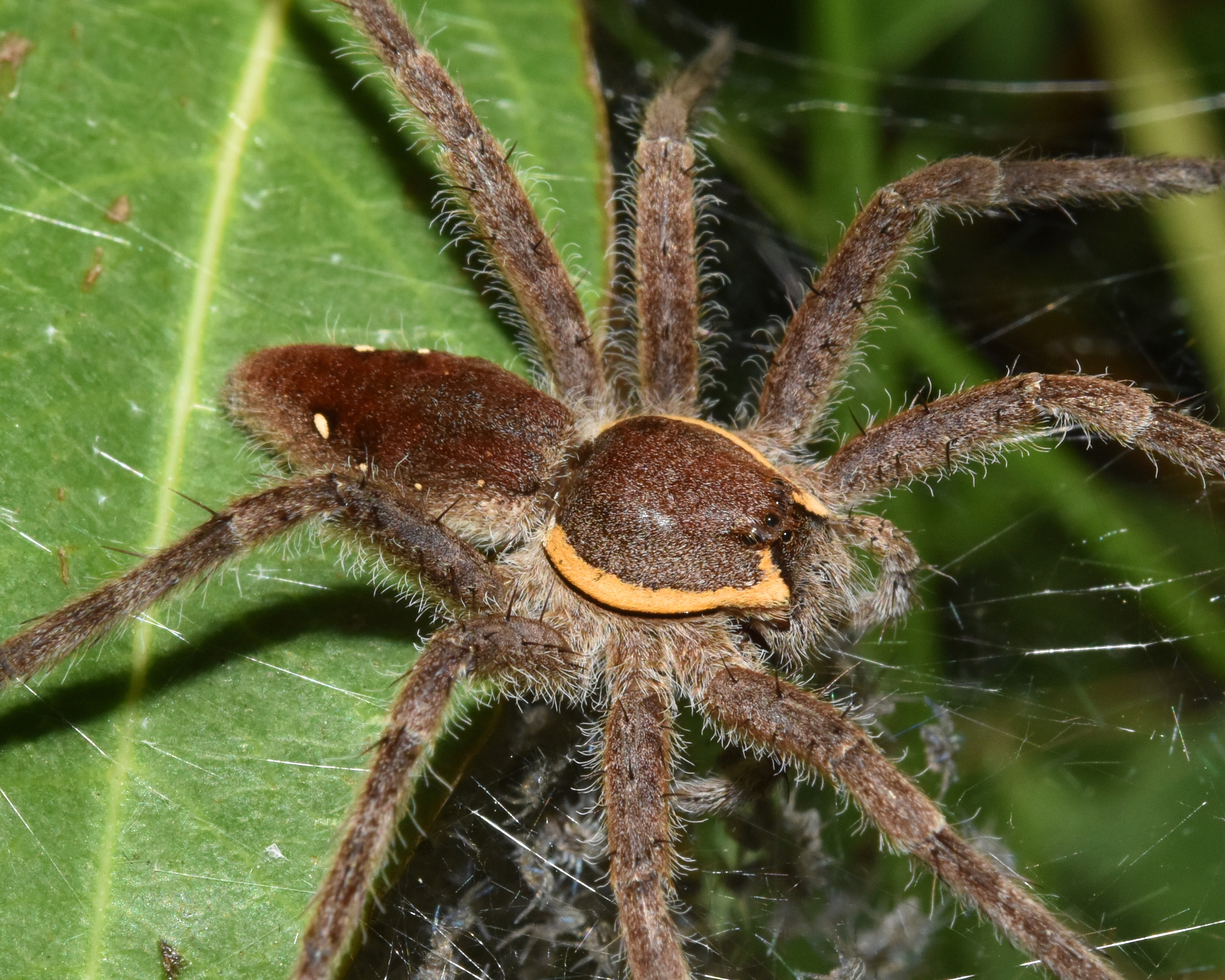

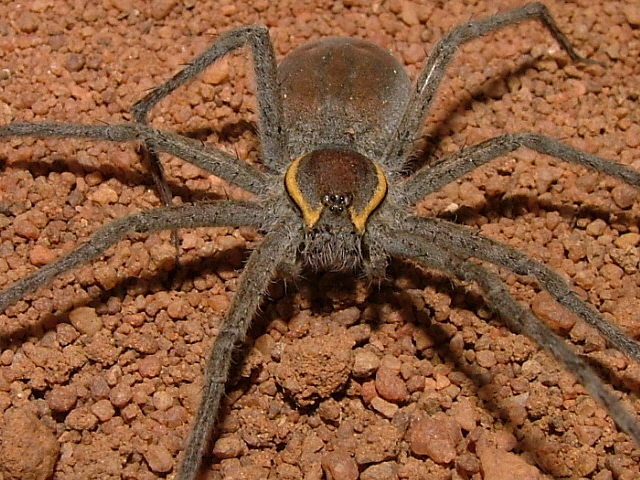

Scientific classification
- Kingdom: Animalia
- Phylum: Arthropoda
- Subphylum: Chelicerata
- Class: Arachnida
- Order: Araneae
- Infraorder: Araneomorphae
- Family: Pisauridae
- Genus: Nilus
- Species: N. margaritatus

Binomial name
- Nilus margaritatus (Pocock, 1898)

Synonyms
- Thalassius margaritatus Pocock, 1898; Thalassius insulanus Berland, 1922; Thalassius cataractus Lawrence, 1927; Thalassius albopunctatus Caporiacco, 1949

= Nilus margaritatus =

White-banded Nilus fish-eating spider

Species of spider

Nilus margaritatus is a spider species in the family Pisauridae. The species is commonly known as the white-banded Nilus fish-eating spider.

== Distribution ==
Nilus margaritatus has been recorded from Kenya, Tanzania, Angola, Namibia, Botswana, Mozambique, South Africa, and Eswatini.

In South Africa, the species has been sampled from four provinces: Gauteng, KwaZulu-Natal, Limpopo, and Mpumalanga.

== Habitat and ecology ==
These are free-running ground dwellers associated with fresh waters and known to catch small fish, tadpoles, and large aquatic invertebrates including insect nymphs or larvae. They can be found at fresh-water pools and have been sampled from the Grassland and Savanna biomes at altitudes ranging from 47 to 1247 m.

== Description ==
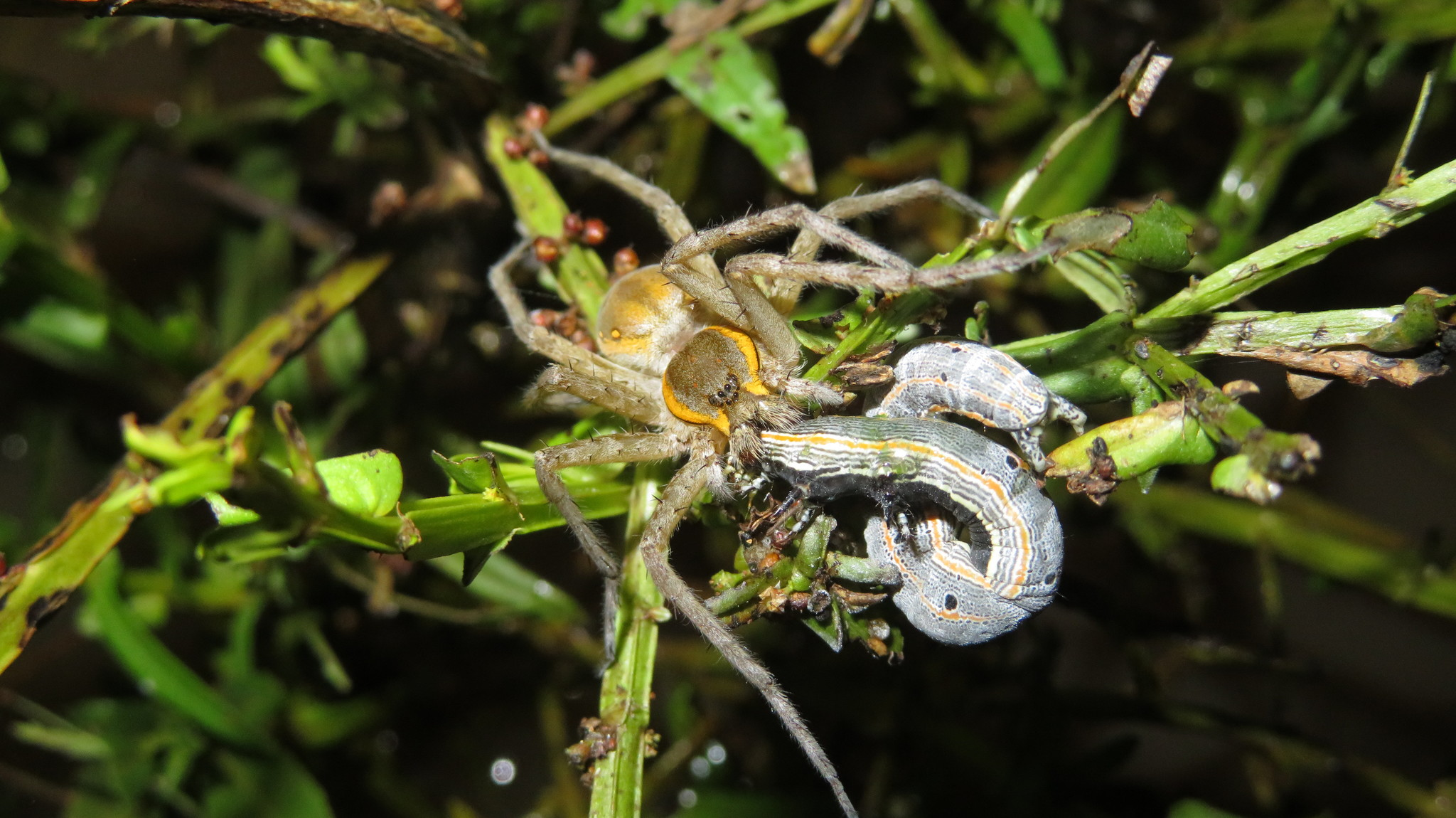
preying on caterpillar

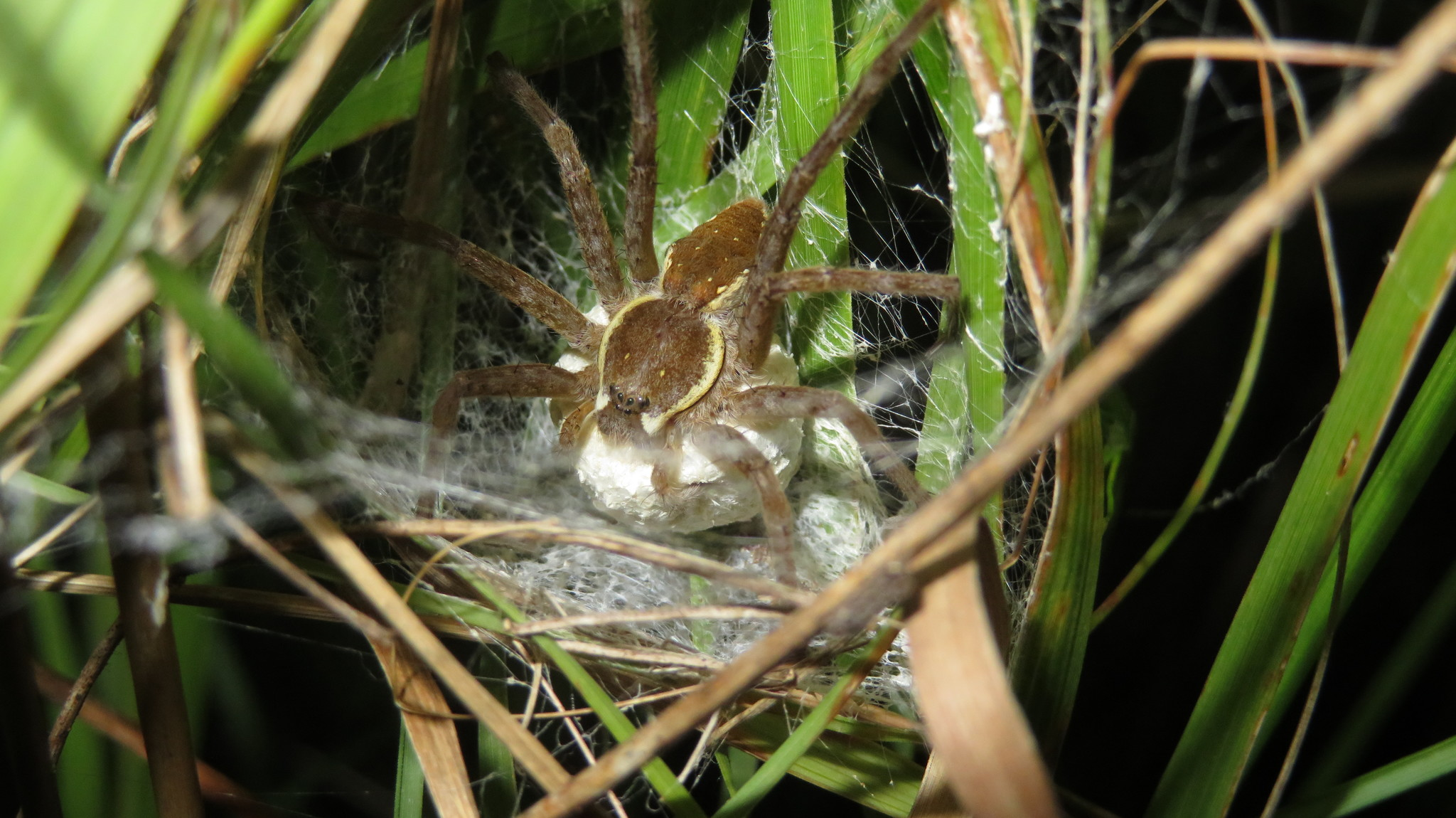
with egg sac

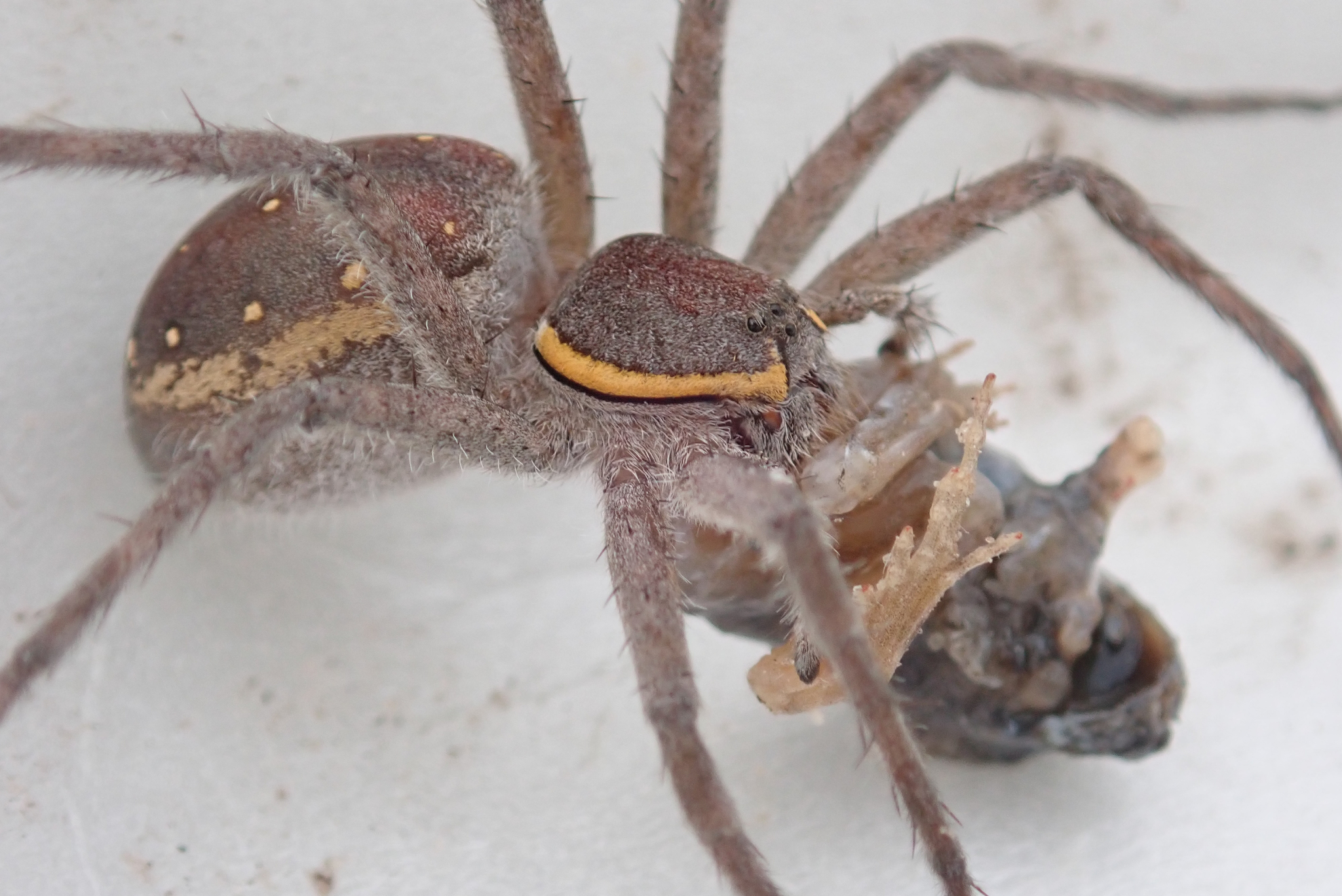

== Conservation ==
Nilus margaritatus is listed as Least Concern due to its wide geographical range. The species is protected in more than 10 protected areas. There are no significant threats to the species.

== Taxonomy ==
The species was originally described by Pocock in 1898 as Thalassius margaritatus from Tanzania. It was transferred to Nilus by Jäger in 2011. The species was revised by Sierwald in 1987 and is known from both sexes.
