= List of Corinnidae species =

This page lists all described genera and species of the spider family Corinnidae. As of March 2019, the World Spider Catalog accepts 872 species in 68 genera:

== A ==
=== Abapeba ===
Abapeba Bonaldo, 2000

- Abapeba abalosi (Mello-Leitão, 1942) — Paraguay, Argentina
- Abapeba brevis (Taczanowski, 1874) — French Guiana
- Abapeba cayana (Taczanowski, 1874) — French Guiana
- Abapeba cleonei (Petrunkevitch, 1926) — St. Thomas
- Abapeba echinus (Simon, 1896) — Brazil
- Abapeba grassima (Chickering, 1972) — Panama
- Abapeba guanicae (Petrunkevitch, 1930) — Puerto Rico
- Abapeba hirta (Taczanowski, 1874) — French Guiana
- Abapeba hoeferi Bonaldo, 2000 — Brazil
- Abapeba kochi (Petrunkevitch, 1911) — South America
- Abapeba lacertosa (Simon, 1898) (type) — St. Vincent, Trinidad, northern South America
- Abapeba luctuosa (F. O. Pickard-Cambridge, 1899) — Mexico
- Abapeba lugubris (Schenkel, 1953) — Venezuela
- Abapeba pennata (Caporiacco, 1947) — Guyana
- Abapeba rioclaro Bonaldo, 2000 — Brazil
- Abapeba rufipes (Taczanowski, 1874) — French Guiana
- Abapeba saga (F. O. Pickard-Cambridge, 1899) — Mexico
- Abapeba sicarioides (Mello-Leitão, 1935) — Brazil
- Abapeba taruma Bonaldo, 2000 — Brazil
- Abapeba wheeleri (Petrunkevitch, 1930) — Puerto Rico

=== Aetius ===
Aetius

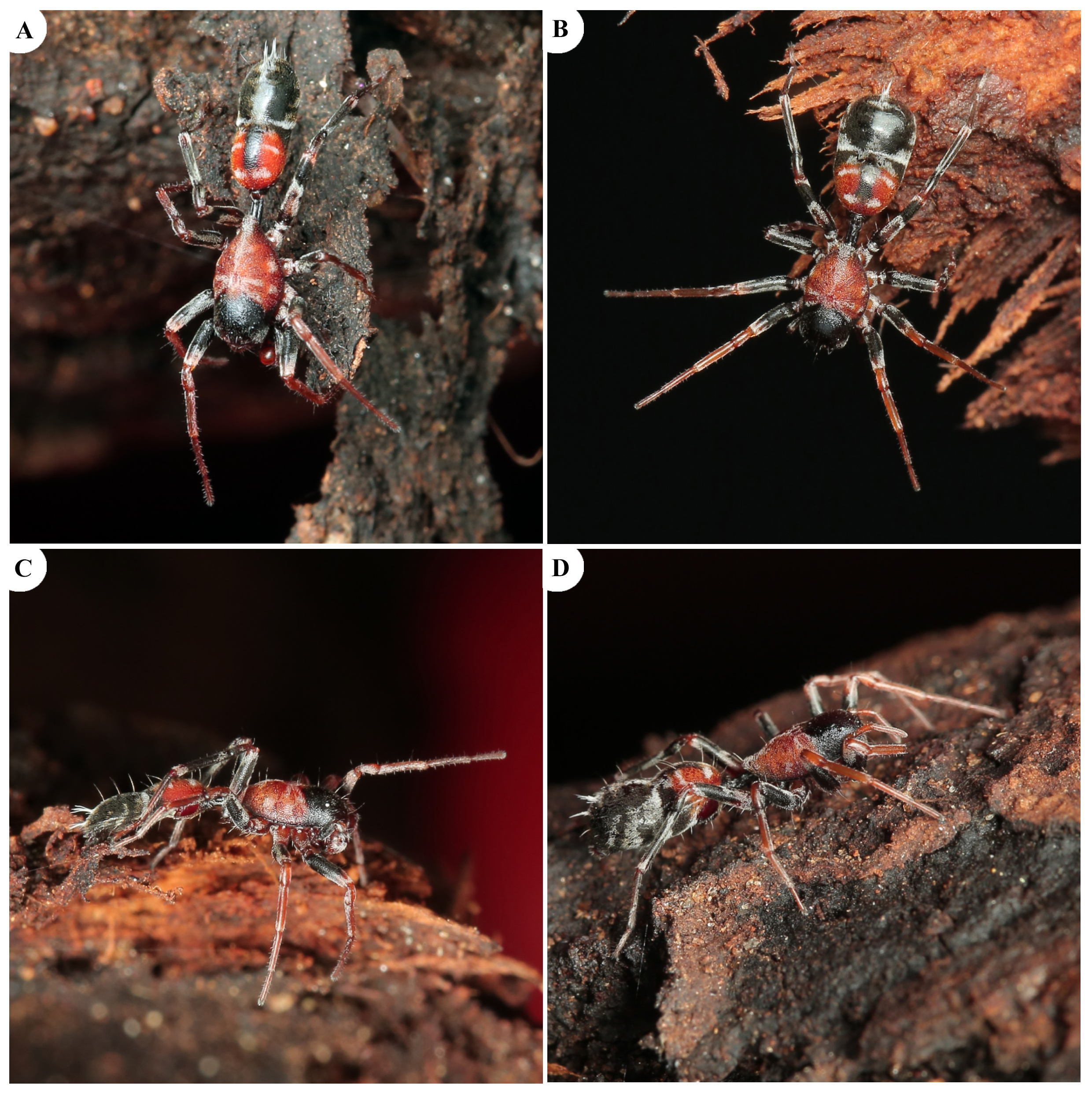
Aetius decollatus

Aetius O. Pickard-Cambridge, 1897

- Aetius decollatus O. Pickard-Cambridge, 1897 (type) — India, Sri Lanka
- Aetius nocturnus Deeleman-Reinhold, 2001 — Thailand, Indonesia (Borneo)
- Aetius tuberculatus (Haddad, 2013) — Ivory Coast

=== Allomedmassa ===
Allomedmassa Dankittipakul & Singtripop, 2014

- Allomedmassa bifurca Jin, H. Zhang & F. Zhang, 2019 — China
- Allomedmassa crassa Jin, H. Zhang & F. Zhang, 2019 — China
- Allomedmassa deelemanae Dankittipakul & Singtripop, 2014 — Malaysia (Borneo)
- Allomedmassa mae Dankittipakul & Singtripop, 2014 (type) — Thailand, China
- Allomedmassa matertera Jin, H. Zhang & F. Zhang, 2019 — China

=== Apochinomma ===
Apochinomma Pavesi, 1881

- Apochinomma acanthaspis Simon, 1896 — Brazil
- Apochinomma armatum Mello-Leitão, 1922 — Brazil
- Apochinomma bilineatum Mello-Leitão, 1939 — Brazil
- Apochinomma constrictum Simon, 1896 — Brazil
- Apochinomma dacetonoides Mello-Leitão, 1948 — Guyana
- Apochinomma decepta Haddad, 2013 — Mozambique, South Africa
- Apochinomma dolosum Simon, 1897 — India
- Apochinomma elongata Haddad, 2013 — Tanzania, Malawi, Botswana
- Apochinomma formica Simon, 1896 — Brazil
- Apochinomma formicaeforme Pavesi, 1881 (type) — West, Central, East, Southern Africa
- Apochinomma formicoides Mello-Leitão, 1939 — Brazil
- Apochinomma malkini Haddad, 2013 — Nigeria
- Apochinomma myrmecioides Mello-Leitão, 1922 — Brazil
- Apochinomma nitidum (Thorell, 1895) — India, Myanmar, Thailand, Indonesia (Borneo, Sulawesi)
- Apochinomma parva Haddad, 2013 — Guinea
- Apochinomma pyriforme (Keyserling, 1891) — Brazil

=== Arushina ===
Arushina Caporiacco, 1947

- Arushina dentichelis Caporiacco, 1947 (type) — Tanzania

=== Attacobius ===
Attacobius Mello-Leitão, 1925

- Attacobius attarum (Roewer, 1935) — Brazil
- Attacobius blakei Bonaldo & Brescovit, 2005 — Brazil
- Attacobius carimbo Pereira-Filho, Saturnino & Bonaldo, 2018 — Brazil
- Attacobius carranca Bonaldo & Brescovit, 2005 — Brazil
- Attacobius demiguise Pereira-Filho, Saturnino & Bonaldo, 2018 — Brazil
- Attacobius kitae Bonaldo & Brescovit, 2005 — Brazil
- Attacobius lamellatus Bonaldo & Brescovit, 2005 — Brazil
- Attacobius lauricae Pereira-Filho, Saturnino & Bonaldo, 2018 — Brazil
- Attacobius lavape Bonaldo, Pesquero & Brescovit, 2018 — Brazil
- Attacobius luederwaldti (Mello-Leitão, 1923) (type) — Brazil
- Attacobius nigripes (Mello-Leitão, 1942) — Argentina
- Attacobius thalitae Pereira-Filho, Saturnino & Bonaldo, 2018 — Brazil
- Attacobius tremembe Pereira-Filho, Saturnino & Bonaldo, 2018 — Brazil
- Attacobius tucurui Bonaldo & Brescovit, 2005 — Brazil
- Attacobius uiriri Bonaldo & Brescovit, 2005 — Brazil
- Attacobius verhaaghi Bonaldo & Brescovit, 1998 — Brazil

=== Austrophaea ===
Austrophaea Lawrence, 1952

- Austrophaea zebra Lawrence, 1952 (type) — South Africa

== B ==
=== Battalus ===
Battalus Karsch, 1878

- Battalus adamparsonsi Raven, 2015 — Australia (Queensland, New South Wales, Victoria)
- Battalus baehrae Raven, 2015 — Australia (South Australia)
- Battalus bidgemia Raven, 2015 — Australia (Western Australia, Queensland)
- Battalus boolathana Raven, 2015 — Australia (Western Australia)
- Battalus byrneae Raven, 2015 — Australia (Tasmania)
- Battalus diadens Raven, 2015 — Australia (Queensland, New South Wales, Victoria)
- Battalus helenstarkae Raven, 2015 — Australia (South Australia)
- Battalus microspinosus Raven, 2015 — Australia (Western Australia, South Australia)
- Battalus rugosus Raven, 2015 — Australia (Western Australia, South Australia)
- Battalus semiflavus (Simon, 1896) — Australia (Queensland)
- Battalus spinipes Karsch, 1878 (type) — Australia (Queensland)
- Battalus wallum Raven, 2015 — Australia (Queensland, New South Wales)
- Battalus zuytdorp Raven, 2015 — Australia (Western Australia)

=== Brachyphaea ===
Brachyphaea Simon, 1895

- Brachyphaea berlandi Lessert, 1915 — East Africa
- Brachyphaea castanea Simon, 1896 — Tanzania (Zanzibar)
- Brachyphaea hulli Lessert, 1921 — East Africa
- Brachyphaea proxima Lessert, 1921 — East Africa
- Brachyphaea simoni Simon, 1895 (type) — East Africa
- Brachyphaea simpliciaculeata Caporiacco, 1949 — Kenya
- Brachyphaea vulpina Simon, 1896 — Mozambique

== C ==
=== Cambalida ===
Cambalida

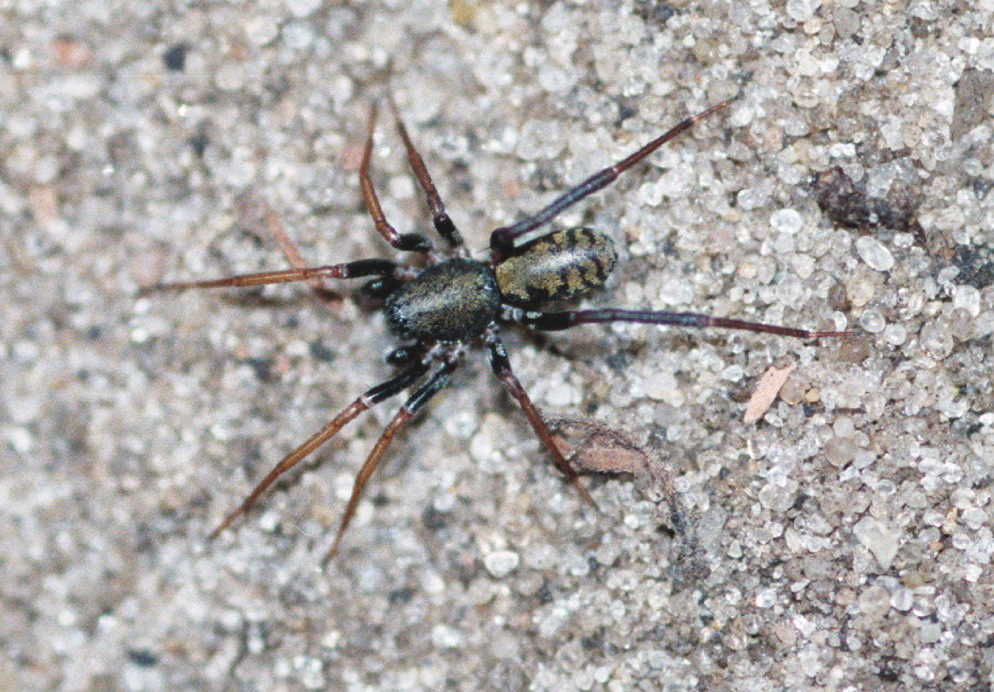
Cambalida dippenaarae, male

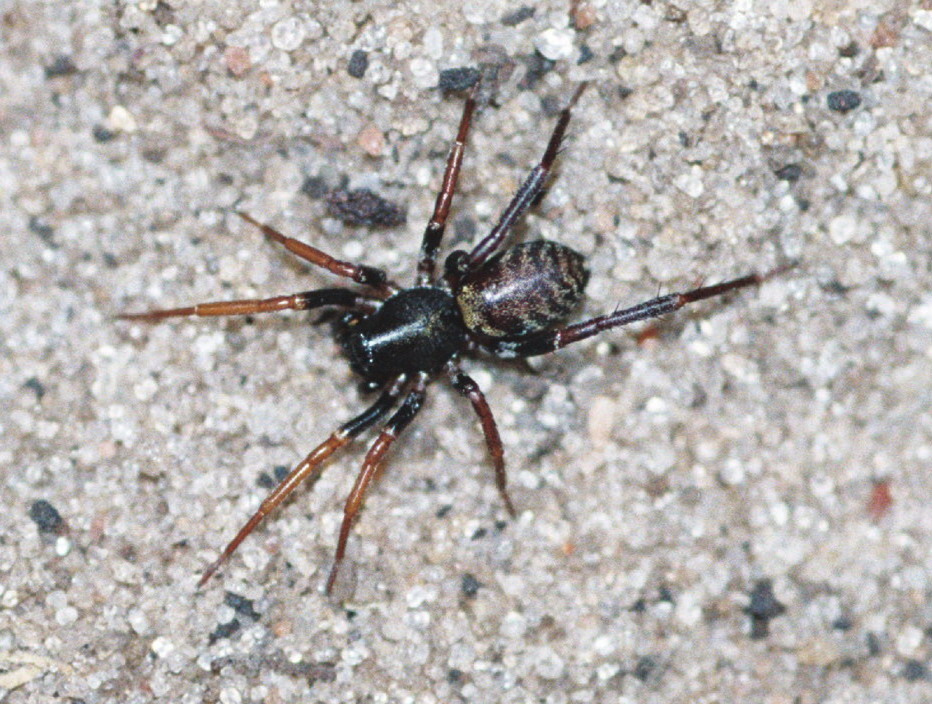
Cambalida dippenaarae, female

Cambalida Simon, 1910

- Cambalida compressa Haddad, 2012 — West Africa
- Cambalida coriacea Simon, 1910 — West, Central Africa
- Cambalida deminuta (Simon, 1910) — West, Central Africa
- Cambalida deorsa Murthappa, Prajapati, Sankaran & Sebastian, 2016 — India
- Cambalida dhupgadensis Bodkhe, Uniyal & Kamble, 2016 — India
- Cambalida dippenaarae Haddad, 2012 — Southern Africa
- Cambalida fagei (Caporiacco, 1939) — Ethiopia
- Cambalida flavipes (Gravely, 1931) — India
- Cambalida fulvipes (Simon, 1896) — Africa
- Cambalida griswoldi Haddad, 2012 — Madagascar
- Cambalida lineata Haddad, 2012 — Madagascar
- Cambalida loricifera (Simon, 1886) — Senegal
- Cambalida tuma Murthappa, Prajapati, Sankaran & Sebastian, 2016 — India
- Cambalida unica Haddad, 2012 — Cameroon

=== Castianeira ===
Castianeira

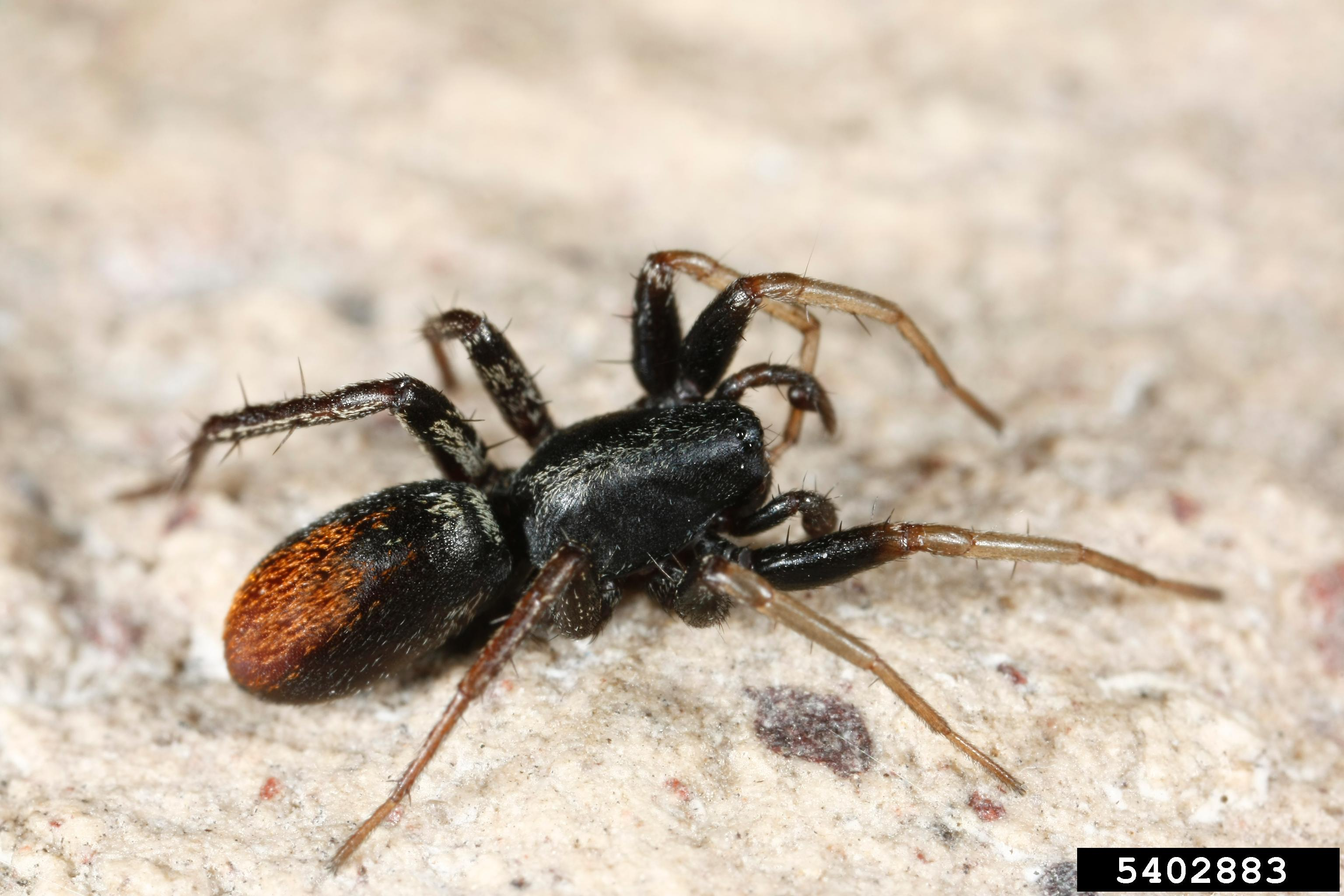
Red spotted ant mimic
(Castianeira descripta)

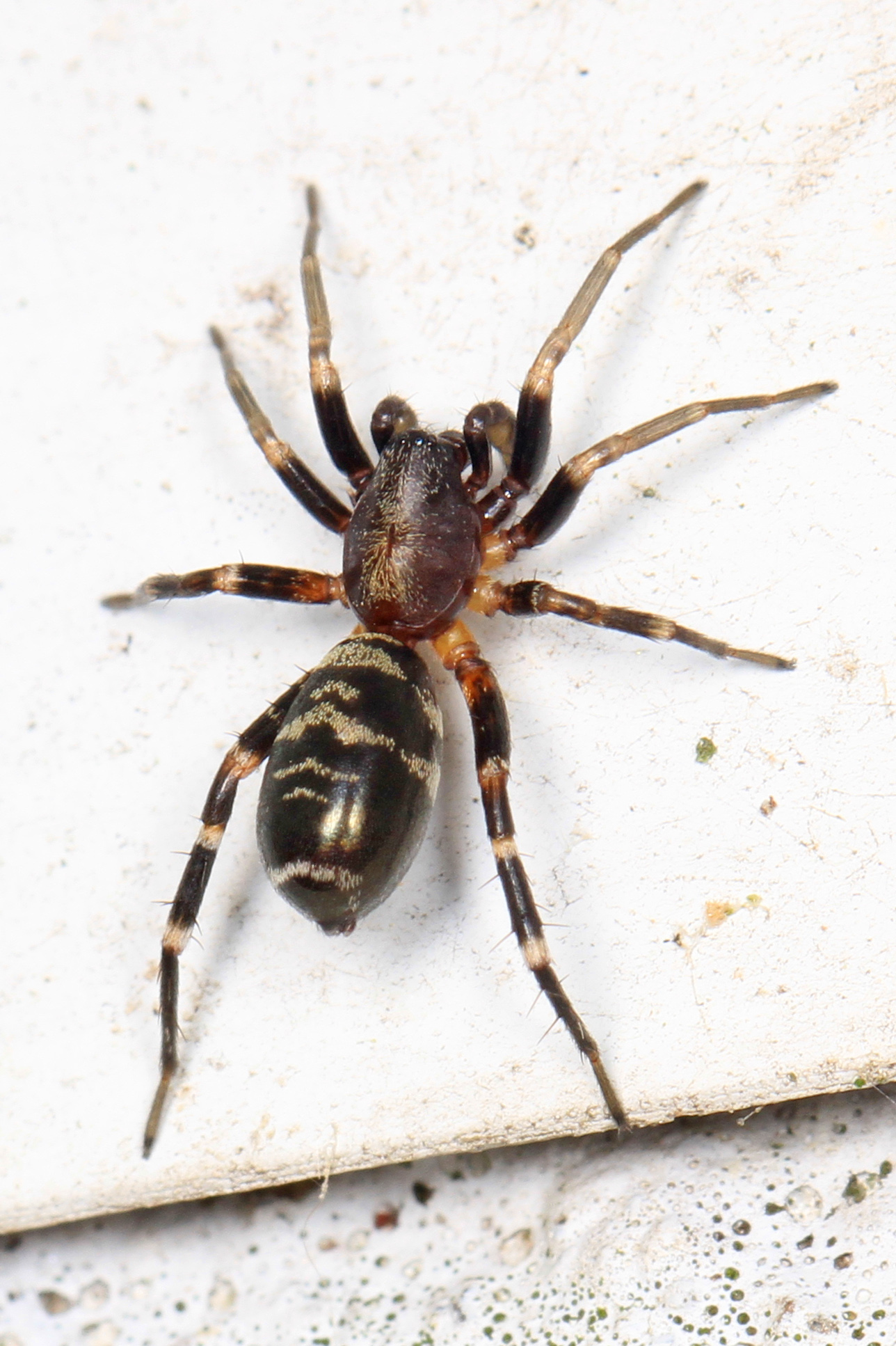
Castianeira longipalpa

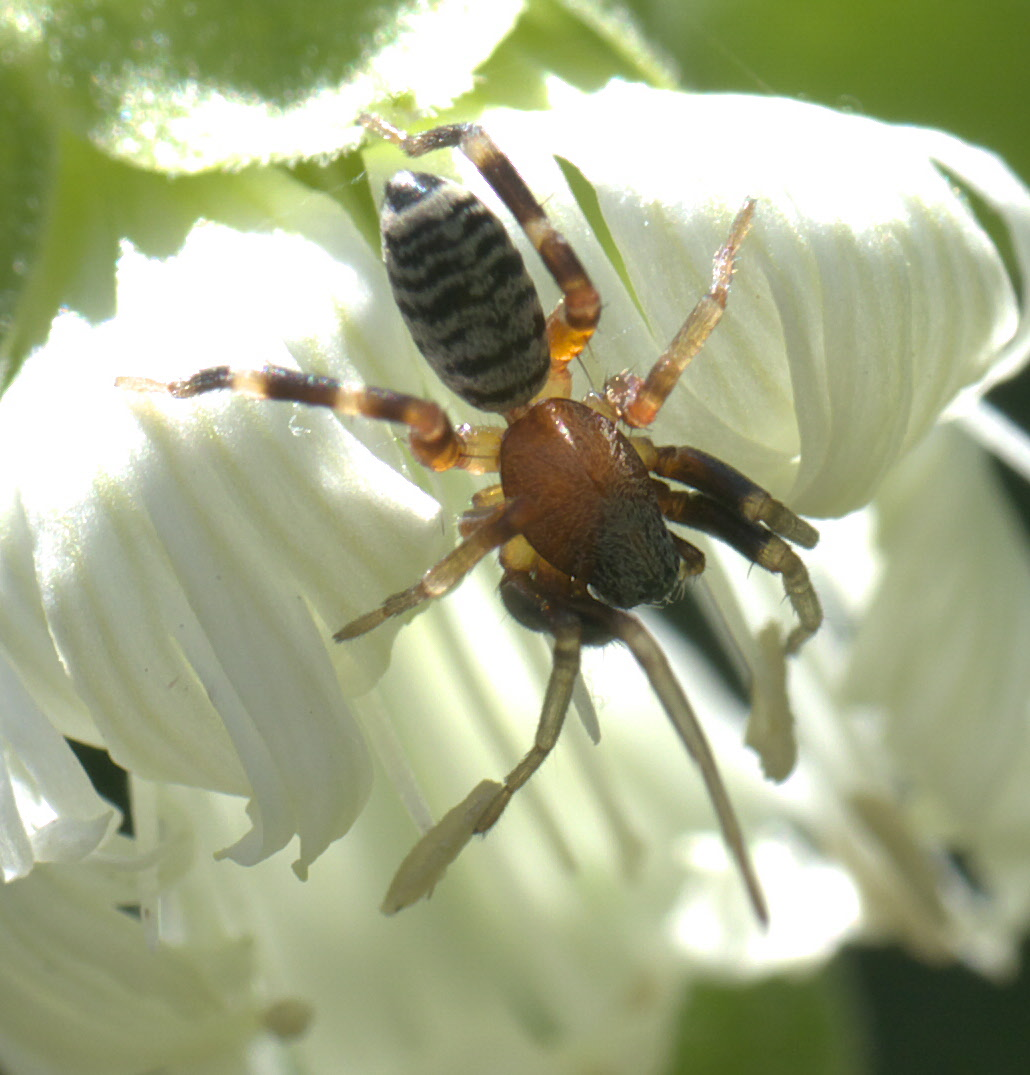
Castianeira variata

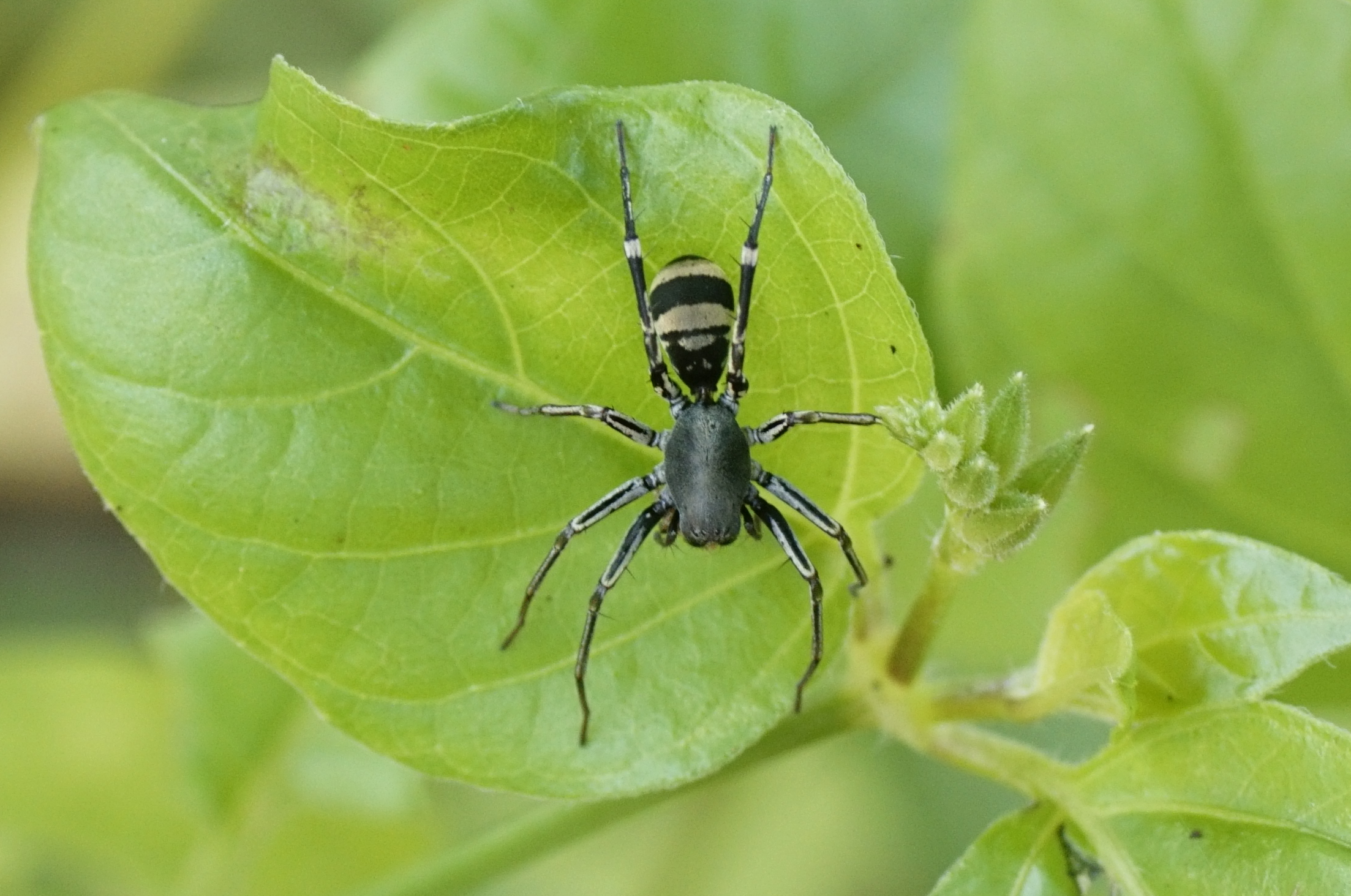
Castianeira zetes

Castianeira Keyserling, 1879

- Castianeira abuelita Reiskind, 1969 — Panama
- Castianeira adhartali Gajbe, 2003 — India
- Castianeira alata Muma, 1945 — USA
- Castianeira alba Reiskind, 1969 — Costa Rica, Panama
- Castianeira albivulvae Mello-Leitão, 1922 — Brazil
- Castianeira albomaculata Berland, 1922 — Kenya
- Castianeira albopicta Gravely, 1931 — India
- Castianeira alfa Reiskind, 1969 — USA
- Castianeira alteranda Gertsch, 1942 — USA, Canada
- Castianeira amiantis Butt & Beg, 2001 — Pakistan
- Castianeira amoena (C. L. Koch, 1841) — USA, Mexico
- Castianeira antinorii (Pavesi, 1880) — Algeria, Tunisia, Sudan, Egypt
- Castianeira arcistriata Yin, Xie, Gong & Kim, 1996 — China
- Castianeira argentina Mello-Leitão, 1942 — Argentina
- Castianeira arnoldii Charitonov, 1946 — Iran, Turkmenistan, Uzbekistan
- Castianeira athena Reiskind, 1969 — USA, Mexico
- Castianeira atypica Mello-Leitão, 1929 — Brazil
- Castianeira azteca Reiskind, 1969 — Mexico
- Castianeira badia (Simon, 1877) — Portugal, Spain
- Castianeira bartholini Simon, 1901 — East Africa
- Castianeira bengalensis Biswas, 1984 — India
- Castianeira bicolor (Simon, 1890) — East Africa
- Castianeira brevis Keyserling, 1891 — Brazil
- Castianeira brunellii Caporiacco, 1940 — Ethiopia
- Castianeira buelowae Mello-Leitão, 1946 — Paraguay
- Castianeira carvalhoi Mello-Leitão, 1947 — Brazil
- Castianeira cecchii (Pavesi, 1883) — Ethiopia, East Africa
- Castianeira chrysura Mello-Leitão, 1943 — Brazil
- Castianeira cincta (Banks, 1929) — Panama
- Castianeira cingulata (C. L. Koch, 1841) — USA, Canada
- Castianeira claveroensis Mello-Leitão, 1943 — Argentina
- Castianeira coquito Rubio, Zapata & Grismado, 2015 — Argentina
- Castianeira crocata (Hentz, 1847) — USA
- Castianeira crucigera (Hentz, 1847) — USA
- Castianeira cubana (Banks, 1926) — USA, Cuba, Panama
- Castianeira cyclindracea Simon, 1896 — Brazil
- Castianeira daoxianensis Yin, Xie, Gong & Kim, 1996 — China
- Castianeira delicatula Simon, 1910 — Sierra Leone
- Castianeira dentata Chickering, 1937 — Panama
- Castianeira descripta (Hentz, 1847) — USA, Canada
- Castianeira dorsata (Banks, 1898) — USA, Mexico
- Castianeira drassodidoides Strand, 1915 — Israel
- Castianeira dubia (O. Pickard-Cambridge, 1898) — Mexico to Panama
- Castianeira dubia Mello-Leitão, 1922 — Brazil
- Castianeira dugesi (Becker, 1879) — Mexico
- Castianeira flavimaculata Hu, Song & Zheng, 1985 — China
- Castianeira flavipatellata Yin, Xie, Gong & Kim, 1996 — China
- Castianeira flebilis O. Pickard-Cambridge, 1898 — Mexico
- Castianeira floridana (Banks, 1904) — USA, Cuba
- Castianeira formosula Simon, 1910 — Equatorial Guinea (Bioko)
- Castianeira furva Sankaran, Malamel, Joseph & Sebastian, 2015 — India
- Castianeira fusconigra Berland, 1922 — Kenya
- Castianeira gaucha Mello-Leitão, 1943 — Brazil
- Castianeira gertschi Kaston, 1945 — USA, Canada
- Castianeira guapa Reiskind, 1969 — Panama
- Castianeira himalayensis Gravely, 1931 — India
- Castianeira hongkong Song, Zhu & Wu, 1997 — China
- Castianeira indica Tikader, 1981 — India
- Castianeira inquinata (Thorell, 1890) — Indonesia (Sumatra)
- Castianeira insulicola Strand, 1916 — East Africa
- Castianeira isophthalma Mello-Leitão, 1930 — Brazil
- Castianeira lachrymosa (O. Pickard-Cambridge, 1898) — Mexico
- Castianeira leptopoda Mello-Leitão, 1929 — Brazil
- Castianeira littoralis Mello-Leitão, 1926 — Brazil
- Castianeira longipalpa (Hentz, 1847) — USA, Canada
- Castianeira luctifera Petrunkevitch, 1911 — USA
- Castianeira luctuosa O. Pickard-Cambridge, 1898 — Mexico
- Castianeira luteipes Mello-Leitão, 1922 — Brazil
- Castianeira maculata Keyserling, 1891 — Brazil
- Castianeira majungae Simon, 1896 — Madagascar
- Castianeira memnonia (C. L. Koch, 1841) — Panama
- Castianeira mexicana (Banks, 1898) — USA, Mexico
- Castianeira micaria (Simon, 1886) — Senegal
- Castianeira minensis Mello-Leitão, 1926 — Brazil
- Castianeira munieri (Simon, 1877) — Morocco, Algeria
- Castianeira nanella Gertsch, 1933 — USA, Mexico
- Castianeira obscura Keyserling, 1891 — Brazil
- Castianeira occidens Reiskind, 1969 — USA, Mexico
- Castianeira onerosa (Keyserling, 1891) — Brazil
- Castianeira patellaris Mello-Leitão, 1943 — Brazil
- Castianeira peregrina (Gertsch, 1935) — USA
- Castianeira phaeochroa Simon, 1910 — Guinea-Bissau
- Castianeira pictipes Mello-Leitão, 1942 — Argentina
- Castianeira plorans (O. Pickard-Cambridge, 1898) — Mexico
- Castianeira polyacantha Mello-Leitão, 1929 — Brazil
- Castianeira pugnax Mello-Leitão, 1948 — Guyana
- Castianeira pulcherrima (O. Pickard-Cambridge, 1874) — Andes
- Castianeira quadrimaculata Reimoser, 1934 — India
- Castianeira quadritaeniata (Simon, 1905) — Indonesia (Java), Philippines
- Castianeira quechua Chamberlin, 1916 — Peru
- Castianeira rica Reiskind, 1969 — Mexico to Costa Rica
- Castianeira rothi Reiskind, 1969 — USA
- Castianeira rubicunda Keyserling, 1879 (type) — Colombia
- Castianeira rugosa Denis, 1958 — Afghanistan
- Castianeira russellsmithi Deeleman-Reinhold, 2001 — Indonesia (Sulawesi)
- Castianeira rutilans Simon, 1896 — Brazil
- Castianeira salticina (Taczanowski, 1874) — French Guiana
- Castianeira scutata Schmidt, 1971 — Brazil
- Castianeira setosa Mello-Leitão, 1947 — Brazil
- Castianeira sexmaculata Mello-Leitão, 1926 — Brazil
- Castianeira shaxianensis Gong, 1983 — China, Korea, Japan
- Castianeira similis (Banks, 1929) — Mexico to Panama
- Castianeira soyauxi (Karsch, 1879) — Congo
- Castianeira spinipalpis Mello-Leitão, 1945 — Argentina
- Castianeira stylifera Kraus, 1955 — El Salvador
- Castianeira tenuiformis Simon, 1896 — Bolivia, Paraguay
- Castianeira tenuis Simon, 1896 — Brazil
- Castianeira teres Simon, 1897 — Paraguay
- Castianeira thalia Reiskind, 1969 — USA
- Castianeira thomensis Simon, 1910 — São Tomé and Príncipe
- Castianeira tinae Patel & Patel, 1973 — India, China
- Castianeira trifasciata Yin, Xie, Gong & Kim, 1996 — China
- Castianeira trilineata (Hentz, 1847) — USA, Canada
- Castianeira trimac Reiskind, 1969 — Panama
- Castianeira truncata Kraus, 1955 — El Salvador
- Castianeira valida Keyserling, 1891 — Brazil
- Castianeira variata Gertsch, 1942 — USA, Canada
- Castianeira venusta (Banks, 1898) — Mexico, Guatemala
- Castianeira venustula (Pavesi, 1895) — Ethiopia
- Castianeira virgulifera Mello-Leitão, 1922 — Brazil
- Castianeira vittatula Roewer, 1951 — Brazil
- Castianeira vulnerea Gertsch, 1942 — USA
- Castianeira walsinghami (O. Pickard-Cambridge, 1874) — USA, Canada
- Castianeira xanthomela Mello-Leitão, 1941 — Argentina
- Castianeira zembla Reiskind, 1969 — Mexico
- Castianeira zetes Simon, 1897 — Pakistan, India, Bangladesh
- Castianeira zionis (Chamberlin & Woodbury, 1929) — USA

=== Castoponera ===
Castoponera Deeleman-Reinhold, 2001

- Castoponera christae Yamasaki, 2016 — Borneo
- Castoponera ciliata (Deeleman-Reinhold, 1993) (type) — Malaysia, Indonesia (Sumatra)
- Castoponera lecythus Deeleman-Reinhold, 2001 — Borneo
- Castoponera scotopoda (Deeleman-Reinhold, 1993) — Borneo

=== Coenoptychus ===
Coenoptychus Simon, 1885

- Coenoptychus mutillicus (Haddad, 2004) — Ivory Coast, Ethiopia, Tanzania, South Africa
- Coenoptychus pulcher Simon, 1885 (type) — India, Sri Lanka
- Coenoptychus tropicalis (Haddad, 2004) — Ivory Coast, DR Congo, Tanzania, South Africa

=== Copa ===
Copa

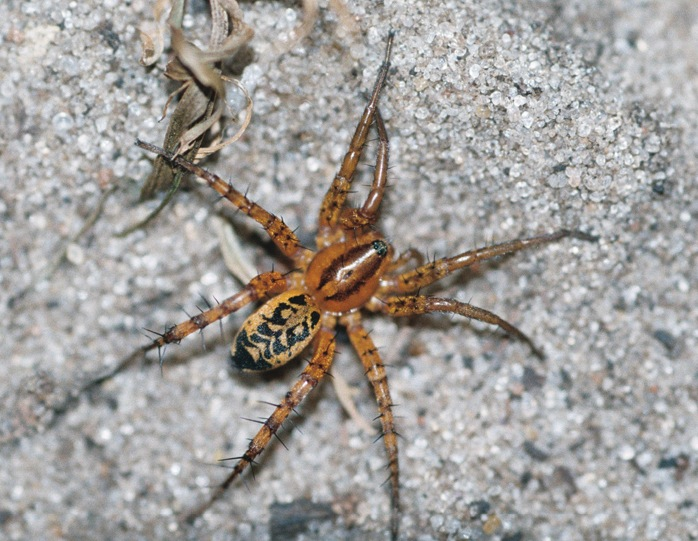
Copa flavoplumosa, female

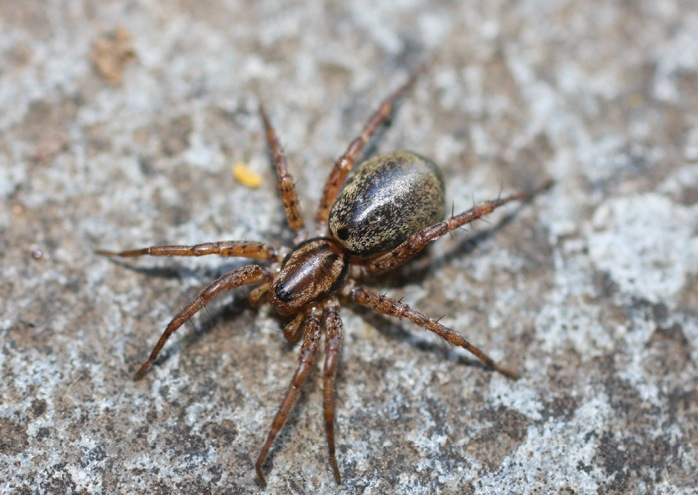
Copa kei, female

Copa Simon, 1886

- Copa annulata Simon, 1896 — Sri Lanka
- Copa auroplumosa Strand, 1907 — Madagascar
- Copa flavoplumosa Simon, 1886 (type) — West, Central, East, South Africa
- Copa kabana Raven, 2015 — Australia (Queensland, New South Wales)
- Copa kei Haddad, 2013 — South Africa
- Copa lineata Simon, 1903 — Madagascar
- Copa spinosa Simon, 1896 — Sri Lanka

=== Copuetta ===
Copuetta Haddad, 2013

- Copuetta comorica Haddad, 2013 — Comoros
- Copuetta erecta Haddad, 2013 — Mozambique, South Africa
- Copuetta kakamega Haddad, 2013 — Kenya
- Copuetta kwamgumi Haddad, 2013 — Tanzania
- Copuetta lacustris (Strand, 1916) — Central, East, Southern Africa
- Copuetta lesnei Haddad, 2013 — Mozambique
- Copuetta litipo Haddad, 2013 — Tanzania
- Copuetta lotzi Haddad, 2013 — South Africa
- Copuetta magna Haddad, 2013 — Tanzania, Mozambique, South Africa
- Copuetta maputa Haddad, 2013 (type) — Mozambique, South Africa
- Copuetta naja Haddad, 2013 — Tanzania
- Copuetta uzungwa Haddad, 2013 — Tanzania
- Copuetta wagneri Haddad, 2013 — Uganda

=== Corinna ===
Corinna C. L. Koch, 1841

- Corinna aberrans Franganillo, 1926 — Cuba
- Corinna aechmea Rodrigues & Bonaldo, 2014 — Brazil
- Corinna aenea Simon, 1896 — Brazil
- Corinna alticeps (Keyserling, 1891) — Brazil
- Corinna andina (Simon, 1898) — Ecuador
- Corinna annulipes (Taczanowski, 1874) — Brazil, French Guiana, Peru
- Corinna anomala Schmidt, 1971 — Ecuador
- Corinna areolata Thorell, 1899 — Cameroon
- Corinna balacobaco Rodrigues & Bonaldo, 2014 — Brazil
- Corinna bicincta Simon, 1896 — Brazil
- Corinna bonneti Caporiacco, 1947 — Guyana
- Corinna botucatensis (Keyserling, 1891) — Brazil
- Corinna bristoweana Mello-Leitão, 1926 — Brazil
- Corinna brunneipeltula Strand, 1911 — New Guinea
- Corinna buccosa Simon, 1896 — Brazil (Amazonas)
- Corinna bulbosa F. O. Pickard-Cambridge, 1899 — Mexico to Panama
- Corinna bulbula F. O. Pickard-Cambridge, 1899 — Panama
- Corinna caatinga Rodrigues & Bonaldo, 2014 — Brazil
- Corinna capito (Lucas, 1857) — Brazil
- Corinna chickeringi (Caporiacco, 1955) — Venezuela
- Corinna colombo Bonaldo, 2000 — Brazil, Argentina
- Corinna corvina Simon, 1896 — Paraguay
- Corinna cribrata (Simon, 1886) — Tanzania (Zanzibar)
- Corinna cruenta (Bertkau, 1880) — Brazil
- Corinna demersa Rodrigues & Bonaldo, 2014 — Brazil
- Corinna ducke Bonaldo, 2000 — Brazil
- Corinna eresiformis Simon, 1896 — Brazil (Amazonas)
- Corinna escalvada Rodrigues & Bonaldo, 2014 — Brazil
- Corinna ferox Simon, 1896 — Brazil, Peru
- Corinna galeata Simon, 1896 — Brazil
- Corinna granadensis (L. Koch, 1866) — Colombia
- Corinna grandis (Simon, 1898) — Brazil, Guyana
- Corinna haemorrhoa (Bertkau, 1880) — Brazil
- Corinna hyalina Rodrigues & Bonaldo, 2014 — Brazil
- Corinna ignota Mello-Leitão, 1922 — Brazil
- Corinna inermis (Bertkau, 1880) — Brazil
- Corinna javuyae Petrunkevitch, 1930 — Puerto Rico
- Corinna jecatatu Rodrigues & Bonaldo, 2014 — Brazil
- Corinna kochi (Simon, 1898) — Colombia
- Corinna kuryi Rodrigues & Bonaldo, 2014 — Brazil
- Corinna loiolai Rodrigues & Bonaldo, 2014 — Brazil
- Corinna longitarsis Strand, 1906 — São Tomé and Príncipe
- Corinna loricata (Bertkau, 1880) — Brazil, Uruguay, Paraguay, Argentina
- Corinna macra (L. Koch, 1866) — Colombia
- Corinna major Berland, 1922 — Kenya
- Corinna mandibulata Strand, 1906 — Ethiopia
- Corinna maracas Rodrigues & Bonaldo, 2014 — Brazil
- Corinna mexicana (Banks, 1898) — Mexico
- Corinna modesta Banks, 1909 — Costa Rica
- Corinna mourai Bonaldo, 2000 — Brazil
- Corinna napaea Simon, 1898 — St. Vincent
- Corinna nitens (Keyserling, 1891) — Peru, Bolivia, Brazil, Uruguay, Paraguay, Argentina
- Corinna nossibeensis Strand, 1907 — Madagascar
- Corinna octodentata Franganillo, 1946 — Cuba
- Corinna olivacea Strand, 1906 — Ethiopia
- Corinna parva (Keyserling, 1891) — Brazil
- Corinna parvula Bryant, 1940 — Cuba, Hispaniola
- Corinna peninsulana Banks, 1898 — Mexico
- Corinna perida Chickering, 1972 — Panama
- Corinna phalerata Simon, 1896 — Brazil
- Corinna pictipes Banks, 1909 — Costa Rica
- Corinna plumipes (Bertkau, 1880) — Brazil
- Corinna propera (Dyal, 1935) — Pakistan
- Corinna pulchella (Bryant, 1948) — Dominican Rep.
- Corinna punicea Simon, 1898 — St. Vincent
- Corinna recurva Bonaldo, 2000 — Brazil
- Corinna regii Rodrigues & Bonaldo, 2014 — Brazil
- Corinna rubripes C. L. Koch, 1841 (type) — Brazil, Guyana
- Corinna sanguinea Strand, 1906 — Ethiopia
- Corinna sanguinea inquirenda Strand, 1906 — Ethiopia
- Corinna selysi (Bertkau, 1880) — Brazil
- Corinna spinifera (Keyserling, 1887) — Nicaragua
- Corinna tatei Gertsch, 1942 — Venezuela
- Corinna telecoteco Rodrigues & Bonaldo, 2014 — Brazil
- Corinna testacea (Banks, 1898) — Mexico
- Corinna toussainti Bryant, 1948 — Hispaniola
- Corinna tranquilla Rodrigues & Bonaldo, 2014 — Brazil
- Corinna travassosi Mello-Leitão, 1939 — Brazil
- Corinna urbanae Soares & Camargo, 1948 — Brazil
- Corinna variegata F. O. Pickard-Cambridge, 1899 — Guatemala, Guyana
- Corinna venezuelica (Caporiacco, 1955) — Venezuela
- Corinna vesperata Rodrigues & Bonaldo, 2014 — Brazil
- Corinna vilanovae Rodrigues & Bonaldo, 2014 — Brazil
- Corinna zecarioca Rodrigues & Bonaldo, 2014 — Brazil
- Corinna ziriguidum Rodrigues & Bonaldo, 2014 — Brazil

=== Corinnomma ===
Corinnomma Karsch, 1880

- Corinnomma afghanicum Roewer, 1962 — Afghanistan
- Corinnomma albobarbatum Simon, 1898 — St. Vincent
- Corinnomma comulatum Thorell, 1891 — India (Nicobar Is.)
- Corinnomma javanum Simon, 1905 — Thailand, Singapore, Indonesia (Java, Borneo)
- Corinnomma lawrencei Haddad, 2006 — Tanzania, Mozambique, South Africa
- Corinnomma moerens Thorell, 1890 — Indonesia (Sumatra)
- Corinnomma olivaceum Simon, 1896 — Ethiopia
- Corinnomma plumosa (Thorell, 1881) — Indonesia (Moluccas)
- Corinnomma rapax Deeleman-Reinhold, 1993 — Indonesia (Sumatra, Borneo)
- Corinnomma rufofuscum Reimoser, 1934 — India
- Corinnomma semiglabrum (Simon, 1896) — Zimbabwe, South Africa, Swaziland
- Corinnomma severum (Thorell, 1877) (type) — India to China, Philippines, Indonesia (Sumatra, Sulawesi)
- Corinnomma thorelli Simon, 1905 — Indonesia (Java)
- Corinnomma yulinguana Barrion, Barrion-Dupo & Heong, 2013 — China

=== Creugas ===
Creugas Thorell, 1878

- Creugas annamae (Gertsch & Davis, 1940) — Mexico
- Creugas apophysarius (Caporiacco, 1947) — Guyana
- Creugas bajulus (Gertsch, 1942) — Mexico
- Creugas bellator (L. Koch, 1866) — Venezuela, Colombia, Ecuador
- Creugas berlandi Bonaldo, 2000 — Ecuador
- Creugas bicuspis (F. O. Pickard-Cambridge, 1899) — Mexico
- Creugas cinnamius Simon, 1888 — Mexico
- Creugas comondensis Jiménez, 2007 — Mexico
- Creugas epicureanus (Chamberlin, 1924) — Mexico
- Creugas falculus (F. O. Pickard-Cambridge, 1899) — Mexico
- Creugas guaycura Jiménez, 2008 — Mexico
- Creugas gulosus Thorell, 1878 (type) — Southern America. Introduced to Africa, Myanmar, Australia, Pacific islands
- Creugas lisei Bonaldo, 2000 — Brazil, Uruguay, Argentina
- Creugas mucronatus (F. O. Pickard-Cambridge, 1899) — Costa Rica, Panama
- Creugas navus (F. O. Pickard-Cambridge, 1899) — Mexico
- Creugas nigricans (C. L. Koch, 1841) — Mexico, Colombia
- Creugas plumatus (L. Koch, 1866) — Colombia
- Creugas praeceps (F. O. Pickard-Cambridge, 1899) — Mexico
- Creugas silvaticus (Chickering, 1937) — Panama
- Creugas uncatus (F. O. Pickard-Cambridge, 1899) — Mexico

=== Crinopseudoa ===
Crinopseudoa Jocqué & Bosselaers, 2011

- Crinopseudoa billeni Jocqué & Bosselaers, 2011 — Guinea
- Crinopseudoa bong Jocqué & Bosselaers, 2011 (type) — Liberia
- Crinopseudoa bongella Jocqué & Bosselaers, 2011 — Liberia
- Crinopseudoa caligula Jocqué & Bosselaers, 2011 — Liberia
- Crinopseudoa catharinae Jocqué & Bosselaers, 2011 — Guinea, Liberia
- Crinopseudoa ephialtes Jocqué & Bosselaers, 2011 — Guinea
- Crinopseudoa flomoi Jocqué & Bosselaers, 2011 — Liberia
- Crinopseudoa leiothorax Jocqué & Bosselaers, 2011 — Guinea
- Crinopseudoa otus Jocqué & Bosselaers, 2011 — Guinea
- Crinopseudoa paucigranulata Jocqué & Bosselaers, 2011 — Guinea
- Crinopseudoa titan Jocqué & Bosselaers, 2011 — Guinea

=== Cycais ===
Cycais Thorell, 1877

- Cycais cylindrata Thorell, 1877 (type) — Indonesia (Sulawesi)
- Cycais gracilis Karsch, 1879 — Japan

== D ==
=== Disnyssus ===
Disnyssus Raven, 2015

- Disnyssus helenmirrenae Raven, 2015 (type) — Australia (Queensland)
- Disnyssus judidenchae Raven, 2015 — Australia (Queensland)

== E ==
=== Echinax ===
Echinax Deeleman-Reinhold, 2001

- Echinax anlongensis Yang, Song & Zhu, 2004 — China
- Echinax bosmansi (Deeleman-Reinhold, 1995) — Indonesia (Sulawesi)
- Echinax clara Haddad, 2012 — Ghana, Congo
- Echinax hesperis Haddad, 2012 — Ivory Coast
- Echinax javana (Deeleman-Reinhold, 1995) — Indonesia (Java)
- Echinax longespina (Simon, 1910) — West, Central, East Africa
- Echinax natalensis Haddad, 2012 — South Africa
- Echinax oxyopoides (Deeleman-Reinhold, 1995) (type) — China, Indonesia (Sumatra), Borneo
- Echinax panache Deeleman-Reinhold, 2001 — China, India, Thailand
- Echinax scharffi Haddad, 2012 — Tanzania
- Echinax similis Haddad, 2012 — South Africa
- Echinax spatulata Haddad, 2012 — West, Central, East Africa

=== Ecitocobius ===
Ecitocobius Bonaldo & Brescovit, 1998

- Ecitocobius comissator Bonaldo & Brescovit, 1998 (type) — Brazil

=== Erendira ===
Erendira Bonaldo, 2000

- Erendira atrox (Caporiacco, 1955) — Venezuela
- Erendira luteomaculata (Petrunkevitch, 1925) — Panama
- Erendira pallidoguttata (Simon, 1898) (type) — Puerto Rico, Lesser Antilles
- Erendira pictithorax (Caporiacco, 1955) — Venezuela
- Erendira subsignata (Simon, 1898) — St. Vincent

== F ==
=== Falconina ===
Falconina Brignoli, 1985

- Falconina albomaculosa (Schmidt, 1971) — Ecuador
- Falconina crassipalpis (Chickering, 1937) — Panama, Cuba
- Falconina gracilis (Keyserling, 1891) — Brazil, Paraguay, Argentina. Introduced to USA
- Falconina melloi (Schenkel, 1953) (type) — Colombia, Venezuela

== G ==
=== Graptartia ===
Graptartia Simon, 1896

- Graptartia granulosa Simon, 1896 (type) — Central, East, Southern Africa
- Graptartia scabra (Simon, 1878) — Morocco, Algeria

== H ==
=== Hortipes ===
Hortipes Bosselaers & Ledoux, 1998

- Hortipes abucoletus Bosselaers & Jocqué, 2000 — Cameroon
- Hortipes aelurisiepae Bosselaers & Jocqué, 2000 — South Africa
- Hortipes alderweireldti Bosselaers & Jocqué, 2000 — Equatorial Guinea
- Hortipes amphibolus Bosselaers & Jocqué, 2000 — Congo
- Hortipes anansiodatus Bosselaers & Jocqué, 2000 — Cameroon
- Hortipes angariopsis Bosselaers & Jocqué, 2000 — Tanzania
- Hortipes arboricola Ledoux & Emerit, 1998 — Gabon
- Hortipes architelones Bosselaers & Jocqué, 2000 — Cameroon
- Hortipes atalante Bosselaers & Jocqué, 2000 — South Africa
- Hortipes auriga Bosselaers & Jocqué, 2000 — Congo
- Hortipes aurora Bosselaers & Jocqué, 2000 — Congo
- Hortipes baerti Bosselaers & Jocqué, 2000 — Ivory Coast
- Hortipes bjorni Bosselaers & Jocqué, 2000 — Tanzania
- Hortipes bosmansi Bosselaers & Jocqué, 2000 — Cameroon
- Hortipes calliblepharus Bosselaers & Jocqué, 2000 — Cameroon
- Hortipes castor Bosselaers & Jocqué, 2000 — Tanzania
- Hortipes centralis Bosselaers & Jocqué, 2000 — Congo
- Hortipes chrysothemis Bosselaers & Jocqué, 2000 — Cameroon
- Hortipes coccinatus Bosselaers & Jocqué, 2000 — South Africa
- Hortipes contubernalis Bosselaers & Jocqué, 2000 — South Africa
- Hortipes creber Bosselaers & Jocqué, 2000 — Tanzania
- Hortipes cucurbita Bosselaers & Jocqué, 2000 — Tanzania
- Hortipes delphinus Bosselaers & Jocqué, 2000 — Tanzania
- Hortipes depravator Bosselaers & Jocqué, 2000 — Cameroon
- Hortipes echo Bosselaers & Jocqué, 2000 — Congo
- Hortipes exoptans Bosselaers & Jocqué, 2000 — Tanzania
- Hortipes falcatus Bosselaers & Jocqué, 2000 — Congo, Rwanda, Uganda
- Hortipes fastigiensis Bosselaers & Jocqué, 2000 — Tanzania
- Hortipes fortipes Bosselaers & Jocqué, 2000 — Equatorial Guinea
- Hortipes gigapophysalis Jocqué, Bosselaers & Henrard, 2012 — Guinea
- Hortipes griswoldi Bosselaers & Jocqué, 2000 — South Africa
- Hortipes hastatus Bosselaers & Jocqué, 2000 — Congo, Uganda
- Hortipes hesperoecius Bosselaers & Jocqué, 2000 — Sierra Leone
- Hortipes hormigricola Bosselaers & Jocqué, 2000 — Cameroon
- Hortipes horta Bosselaers & Jocqué, 2000 — Congo
- Hortipes hyakutake Bosselaers & Jocqué, 2000 — South Africa
- Hortipes irimus Bosselaers & Jocqué, 2000 — South Africa
- Hortipes klumpkeae Bosselaers & Jocqué, 2000 — Tanzania
- Hortipes lejeunei Bosselaers & Jocqué, 2000 — Congo, Rwanda
- Hortipes leno Bosselaers & Jocqué, 2000 — Tanzania
- Hortipes libidinosus Bosselaers & Jocqué, 2000 — Tanzania
- Hortipes licnophorus Bosselaers & Jocqué, 2000 — South Africa
- Hortipes limicola Ledoux & Emerit, 1998 — Gabon
- Hortipes luytenae Bosselaers & Ledoux, 1998 (type) — South Africa
- Hortipes machaeropolion Bosselaers & Jocqué, 2000 — Nigeria
- Hortipes marginatus Ledoux & Emerit, 1998 — Ivory Coast
- Hortipes merwei Bosselaers & Jocqué, 2000 — South Africa
- Hortipes mesembrinus Bosselaers & Jocqué, 2000 — South Africa
- Hortipes mulciber Bosselaers & Jocqué, 2000 — Tanzania
- Hortipes narcissus Bosselaers & Jocqué, 2000 — Congo
- Hortipes orchatocnemis Bosselaers & Jocqué, 2000 — Malawi
- Hortipes oronesiotes Bosselaers & Jocqué, 2000 — Malawi
- Hortipes ostiovolutus Bosselaers & Jocqué, 2000 — Tanzania
- Hortipes paludigena Ledoux & Emerit, 1998 — Gabon
- Hortipes penthesileia Bosselaers & Jocqué, 2000 — Malawi
- Hortipes platnicki Bosselaers & Jocqué, 2000 — Tanzania
- Hortipes pollux Bosselaers & Jocqué, 2000 — Malawi
- Hortipes puylaerti Bosselaers & Jocqué, 2000 — Cameroon
- Hortipes robertus Bosselaers & Jocqué, 2000 — Cameroon
- Hortipes rothorum Bosselaers & Jocqué, 2000 — South Africa
- Hortipes salticola Bosselaers & Jocqué, 2000 — Tanzania
- Hortipes sceptrum Bosselaers & Jocqué, 2000 — Cameroon
- Hortipes scharffi Bosselaers & Jocqué, 2000 — Tanzania
- Hortipes schoemanae Bosselaers & Jocqué, 2000 — South Africa
- Hortipes silvarum Ledoux & Emerit, 1998 — Ivory Coast
- Hortipes stoltzei Bosselaers & Jocqué, 2000 — Tanzania
- Hortipes tarachodes Bosselaers & Jocqué, 2000 — Congo
- Hortipes terminator Bosselaers & Jocqué, 2000 — Congo
- Hortipes wimmertensi Bosselaers & Jocqué, 2000 — South Africa
- Hortipes zombaensis Bosselaers & Jocqué, 2000 — Malawi

=== Humua ===
Humua

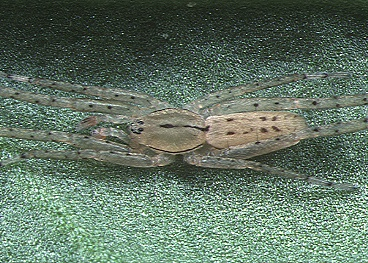
Humua takeuchii, male

Humua Ono, 1987

- Humua takeuchii Ono, 1987 (type) — Japan (Ryukyu Is.)

== I ==
=== Ianduba ===
Ianduba Bonaldo, 1997

- Ianduba abara Bonaldo & Brescovit, 2007 — Brazil
- Ianduba acaraje Magalhaes, Fernandes, Ramírez & Bonaldo, 2016 — Brazil
- Ianduba angeloi Magalhaes, Fernandes, Ramírez & Bonaldo, 2016 — Brazil
- Ianduba apururuca Magalhaes, Fernandes, Ramírez & Bonaldo, 2016 — Brazil
- Ianduba beaga Magalhaes, Fernandes, Ramírez & Bonaldo, 2016 — Brazil
- Ianduba benjori Magalhaes, Fernandes, Ramírez & Bonaldo, 2016 — Brazil
- Ianduba capixaba Magalhaes, Fernandes, Ramírez & Bonaldo, 2016 — Brazil
- Ianduba caxixe Bonaldo, 1997 — Brazil
- Ianduba dabadu Magalhaes, Fernandes, Ramírez & Bonaldo, 2016 — Brazil
- Ianduba liberta Magalhaes, Fernandes, Ramírez & Bonaldo, 2016 — Brazil
- Ianduba mugunza Bonaldo & Brescovit, 2007 — Brazil
- Ianduba patua Bonaldo, 1997 — Brazil
- Ianduba paubrasil Bonaldo, 1997 — Brazil
- Ianduba varia (Keyserling, 1891) — Brazil, Argentina
- Ianduba vatapa Bonaldo, 1997 (type) — Brazil

=== Iridonyssus ===
Iridonyssus Raven, 2015

- Iridonyssus auripilosus Raven, 2015 — Australia (Queensland)
- Iridonyssus formicans Raven, 2015 — Australia (Queensland to Victoria, Western Australia, South Australia)
- Iridonyssus kohouti Raven, 2015 (type) — Australia (Queensland)
- Iridonyssus leucostaurus Raven, 2015 — Australia (Queensland)

== K ==
=== Kolora ===
Kolora Raven, 2015

- Kolora cooloola Raven, 2015 (type) — Australia (Queensland)
- Kolora cushingae Raven, 2015 — Australia (Queensland)
- Kolora lynneae Raven, 2015 — Australia (Queensland)
- Kolora suaverubens (Simon, 1896) — Australia (Queensland)

== L ==
=== Leichhardteus ===
Leichhardteus Raven & Baehr, 2013

- Leichhardteus albofasciatus Baehr & Raven, 2013 — Australia (Queensland, New South Wales)
- Leichhardteus badius Baehr & Raven, 2013 — Australia (Queensland)
- Leichhardteus bimaculatus Baehr & Raven, 2013 — Australia (Queensland)
- Leichhardteus conopalpis Baehr & Raven, 2013 (type) — Eastern Australia
- Leichhardteus evschlingeri Raven, 2015 — Australia (Western Australia)
- Leichhardteus garretti Baehr & Raven, 2013 — Australia (Queensland)
- Leichhardteus kroombit Baehr & Raven, 2013 — Australia (Queensland, New South Wales)
- Leichhardteus reinhardi Baehr & Raven, 2013 — Australia (Queensland)
- Leichhardteus strzelecki Raven, 2015 — Australia (Victoria)
- Leichhardteus terriirwinae Baehr & Raven, 2013 — Australia (Queensland)
- Leichhardteus yagan Raven, 2015 — Australia (Western Australia)

=== Leptopicia ===
Leptopicia Raven, 2015

- Leptopicia bimaculata (Simon, 1896) (type) — Australia (Queensland)

== M ==
=== Mandaneta ===
Mandaneta Strand, 1932

- Mandaneta sudana (Karsch, 1880) (type) — Ghana, Congo

=== Mazax ===
Mazax O. Pickard-Cambridge, 1898

- Mazax ajax Reiskind, 1969 — Mexico
- Mazax chickeringi Reiskind, 1969 — Jamaica
- Mazax kaspari Cokendolpher, 1978 — USA
- Mazax pax Reiskind, 1969 (type) — USA to Panama
- Mazax ramirezi Rubio & Danişman, 2014 — Argentina
- Mazax spinosa (Simon, 1898) — Central America, Lesser Antilles
- Mazax xerxes Reiskind, 1969 — Costa Rica

=== Medmassa ===
Medmassa Simon, 1887

- Medmassa celebensis (Deeleman-Reinhold, 1995) — Indonesia (Sulawesi)
- Medmassa christae Raven, 2015 — Australia (Queensland)
- Medmassa diplogale Deeleman-Reinhold, 2001 — Borneo
- Medmassa frenata (Simon, 1877) (type) — Philippines
- Medmassa insignis (Thorell, 1890) — Indonesia (Sumatra, Borneo)
- Medmassa kltina (Barrion & Litsinger, 1995) — Philippines
- Medmassa pulchra (Thorell, 1881) — New Guinea
- Medmassa semiaurantiaca Simon, 1910 — Africa
- Medmassa tigris (Deeleman-Reinhold, 1995) — Indonesia (Sumatra, Borneo)
- Medmassa torta Jin, H. Zhang & F. Zhang, 2019 — China (Hainan)

=== Megalostrata ===
Megalostrata Karsch, 1880

- Megalostrata bruneri (Bryant, 1936) — Cuba
- Megalostrata depicta (O. Pickard-Cambridge, 1895) — Mexico
- Megalostrata monistica (Chamberlin, 1924) — Mexico
- Megalostrata raptor (L. Koch, 1866) (type) — Mexico to Panama

=== Melanesotypus ===
Melanesotypus Raven, 2015

- Melanesotypus guadal Raven, 2015 (type) — Solomon Is.

=== Merenius ===
Merenius Simon, 1910

- Merenius alberti Lessert, 1923 — Southern Africa
- Merenius concolor Caporiacco, 1947 — Tanzania
- Merenius myrmex Simon, 1910 — Guinea-Bissau
- Merenius plumosus Simon, 1910 (type) — Guinea-Bissau
- Merenius proximus Lessert, 1929 — Congo
- Merenius proximus quadrimaculatus Lessert, 1946 — Congo
- Merenius recurvatus (Strand, 1906) — Ethiopia, East Africa
- Merenius secundus (Strand, 1907) — Tanzania
- Merenius simoni Lessert, 1921 — Congo, East Africa
- Merenius solitarius Lessert, 1946 — Congo
- Merenius tenuiculus Simon, 1910 — Sierra Leone
- Merenius yemenensis Denis, 1953 — Yemen

=== Messapus ===
Messapus Simon, 1898

- Messapus martini Simon, 1898 (type) — Zambia, South Africa
- Messapus megae Haddad & Mbo, 2015 — Zimbabwe
- Messapus meridionalis Haddad & Mbo, 2015 — South Africa
- Messapus natalis (Pocock, 1898) — Mozambique, South Africa
- Messapus seiugatus Haddad & Mbo, 2015 — Guinea
- Messapus tigris Haddad & Mbo, 2015 — Botswana, Namibia
- Messapus tropicus Haddad & Mbo, 2015 — Congo

=== Methesis ===
Methesis Simon, 1896

- Methesis brevitarsa Caporiacco, 1954 — French Guiana
- Methesis semirufa Simon, 1896 (type) — Colombia, Brazil, Peru, Bolivia

=== Myrmecium ===
Myrmecium Latreille, 1824

- Myrmecium amphora Candiani & Bonaldo, 2017 — Venezuela
- Myrmecium bifasciatum Taczanowski, 1874 — Bolivia, Trinidad, Guyana, Suriname, French Guiana, Brazil
- Myrmecium bolivari Candiani & Bonaldo, 2017 — Venezuela, Colombia
- Myrmecium bonaerense Holmberg, 1881 — Argentina
- Myrmecium camponotoides Mello-Leitão, 1932 — Brazil
- Myrmecium carajas Candiani & Bonaldo, 2017 — Brazil
- Myrmecium carvalhoi Candiani & Bonaldo, 2017 — Brazil
- Myrmecium catuxy Candiani & Bonaldo, 2017 — Colombia, Brazil
- Myrmecium chikish Candiani & Bonaldo, 2017 — Peru
- Myrmecium cizauskasi Candiani & Bonaldo, 2017 — Brazil
- Myrmecium dacetoniforme Mello-Leitão, 1932 — Brazil
- Myrmecium deladanta Candiani & Bonaldo, 2017 — Ecuador
- Myrmecium diasi Candiani & Bonaldo, 2017 — Brazil
- Myrmecium erici Candiani & Bonaldo, 2017 — Guyana
- Myrmecium ferro Candiani & Bonaldo, 2017 — Brazil
- Myrmecium fuscum Dahl, 1907 — Peru, Bolivia, Brazil
- Myrmecium indicattii Candiani & Bonaldo, 2017 — Brazil
- Myrmecium latreillei (Lucas, 1857) — Brazil
- Myrmecium lomanhungae Candiani & Bonaldo, 2017 — Brazil
- Myrmecium luepa Candiani & Bonaldo, 2017 — Venezuela
- Myrmecium machetero Candiani & Bonaldo, 2017 — Bolivia, Peru
- Myrmecium malleum Candiani & Bonaldo, 2017 — Venezuela, Colombia
- Myrmecium monacanthum Simon, 1897 — Colombia
- Myrmecium nogueirai Candiani & Bonaldo, 2017 — Peru, Brazil
- Myrmecium oliveirai Candiani & Bonaldo, 2017 — Brazil
- Myrmecium oompaloompa Candiani & Bonaldo, 2017 — Brazil, Guyana
- Myrmecium otti Candiani & Bonaldo, 2017 — Peru, Brazil
- Myrmecium pakpaka Candiani & Bonaldo, 2017 — Peru
- Myrmecium raveni Candiani & Bonaldo, 2017 — Brazil
- Myrmecium reticulatum Dahl, 1907 — Peru
- Myrmecium ricettii Candiani & Bonaldo, 2017 — Colombia, Brazil
- Myrmecium rufum Latreille, 1824 (type) — Brazil
- Myrmecium souzai Candiani & Bonaldo, 2017 — Brazil
- Myrmecium tanguro Candiani & Bonaldo, 2017 — Brazil
- Myrmecium tikuna Candiani & Bonaldo, 2017 — Brazil
- Myrmecium trifasciatum Caporiacco, 1947 — Guyana, Brazil
- Myrmecium urucu Candiani & Bonaldo, 2017 — Brazil
- Myrmecium viehmeyeri Dahl, 1907 — Peru, Bolivia, Brazil
- Myrmecium yamamotoi Candiani & Bonaldo, 2017 — Suriname, Brazil

=== Myrmecotypus ===
Myrmecotypus O. Pickard-Cambridge, 1894

- Myrmecotypus fuliginosus O. Pickard-Cambridge, 1894 (type) — Mexico
- Myrmecotypus iguazu Rubio & Arbino, 2009 — Argentina
- Myrmecotypus jasmineae Leister & Miller, 2014 — Nicaragua
- Myrmecotypus lineatipes Chickering, 1937 — Panama
- Myrmecotypus lineatus (Emerton, 1909) — USA
- Myrmecotypus niger Chickering, 1937 — Panama
- Myrmecotypus olympus Reiskind, 1969 — Panama
- Myrmecotypus orpheus Reiskind, 1969 — Panama
- Myrmecotypus pilosus (O. Pickard-Cambridge, 1898) — Mexico to Panama
- Myrmecotypus rettenmeyeri Unzicker, 1965 — Panama

== N ==
=== Nucastia ===
Nucastia Raven, 2015

- Nucastia culburra Raven, 2015 — Australia (South Australia)
- Nucastia eneabba Raven, 2015 — Australia (Western Australia)
- Nucastia muncoonie Raven, 2015 — Australia (Queensland)
- Nucastia supunnoides Raven, 2015 — Australia (Victoria)
- Nucastia virewoods Raven, 2015 (type) — Australia (Victoria)

=== Nyssus ===
Nyssus

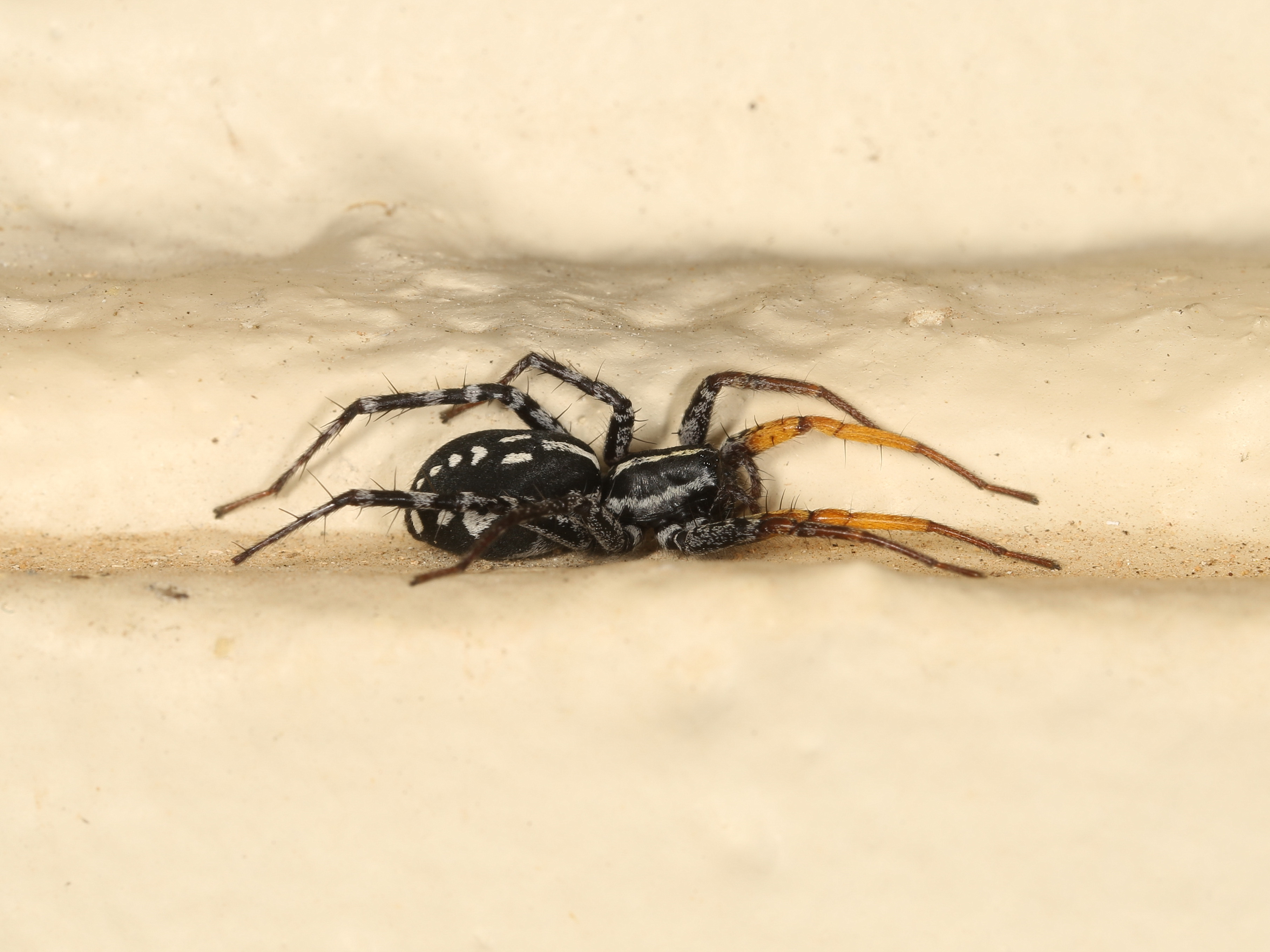
Nyssus coloripes

Nyssus Walckenaer, 1805

- Nyssus albopunctatus (Hogg, 1896) — Australia (Northern Territory, New South Wales, Tasmania), New Zealand
- Nyssus avidus (Thorell, 1881) — Australia (Queensland)
- Nyssus coloripes Walckenaer, 1805 (type) — Australia (mainland, Tasmania). Introduced to New Zealand
- Nyssus emu Raven, 2015 — Australia (Queensland)
- Nyssus insularis (L. Koch, 1873) — Fiji, Solomon Is.
- Nyssus jaredwardeni Raven, 2015 — Australia (Queensland)
- Nyssus jonraveni Raven, 2015 — Australia (South Australia, Queensland)
- Nyssus loureedi Raven, 2015 — Australia (Lord Howe Is.)
- Nyssus luteofinis Raven, 2015 — Australia (Queensland)
- Nyssus paradoxus Raven, 2015 — Australia (Queensland)
- Nyssus pseudomaculatus Raven, 2015 — Australia (Queensland, New South Wales)
- Nyssus robertsi Raven, 2015 — Australia (Queensland)
- Nyssus semifuscus Raven, 2015 — Australia (Queensland)
- Nyssus wendyae Raven, 2015 — Australia (Queensland)
- Nyssus yuggera Raven, 2015 — Australia (Queensland, New South Wales)

== O ==
=== Olbus ===
Olbus Simon, 1880

- Olbus eryngiophilus Ramírez, Lopardo & Bonaldo, 2001 — Chile
- Olbus jaguar Ramírez, Lopardo & Bonaldo, 2001 — Chile
- Olbus krypto Ramírez, Lopardo & Bonaldo, 2001 — Chile
- Olbus nahuelbuta Ramírez, Lopardo & Bonaldo, 2001 — Chile
- Olbus sparassoides (Nicolet, 1849) (type) — Chile

=== Ozcopa ===
Ozcopa Raven, 2015

- Ozcopa chiunei Raven, 2015 — Australia (Queensland)
- Ozcopa colloffi Raven, 2015 (type) — Australia (Queensland)
- Ozcopa margotandersenae Raven, 2015 — Australia (Queensland)
- Ozcopa mcdonaldi Raven, 2015 — Australia (Queensland)
- Ozcopa monteithi Raven, 2015 — Australia (Queensland)
- Ozcopa zborowskii Raven, 2015 — Australia (Queensland)

== P ==
=== Parachemmis ===
Parachemmis Chickering, 1937

- Parachemmis fuscus Chickering, 1937 (type) — Panama
- Parachemmis hassleri (Gertsch, 1942) — Guyana
- Parachemmis julioblancoi Martinez-G & Villarreal, 2017 — Colombia
- Parachemmis manauara Bonaldo, 2000 — Brazil

=== Paradiestus ===
Paradiestus Mello-Leitão, 1915

- Paradiestus aurantiacus Mello-Leitão, 1915 (type) — Brazil
- Paradiestus egregius (Simon, 1896) — Brazil
- Paradiestus giganteus (Karsch, 1880) — Brazil
- Paradiestus penicillatus (Mello-Leitão, 1939) — Brazil
- Paradiestus vitiosus (Keyserling, 1891) — Brazil

=== Paramedmassa ===
Paramedmassa Jin, H. Zhang & F. Zhang, 2019

- Paramedmassa day (Dankittipakul & Singtripop, 2014) (type) — Thailand, Laos, China

=== Poecilipta ===
Poecilipta Simon, 1897

- Poecilipta carnarvon Raven, 2015 — Australia (Western Australia)
- Poecilipta contorqua Raven, 2015 — Australia (New South Wales)
- Poecilipta davidi Raven, 2015 — Australia (South Australia)
- Poecilipta elvis Raven, 2015 — Australia (Western Australia)
- Poecilipta formiciforme (Rainbow, 1904) — Australia (New South Wales)
- Poecilipta gloverae Raven, 2015 — Australia (Queensland)
- Poecilipta harveyi Raven, 2015 — Australia (Western Australia)
- Poecilipta janthina Simon, 1896 (type) — Australia (Queensland)
- Poecilipta jilbadji Raven, 2015 — Australia (Western Australia)
- Poecilipta kgari Raven, 2015 — Australia (Queensland)
- Poecilipta kohouti Raven, 2015 — Australia (Northern Territory, South Australia, Queensland, New South Wales)
- Poecilipta lugubris Raven, 2015 — Australia (New South Wales, Australian Capital Territory)
- Poecilipta mandjelia Raven, 2015 — New Caledonia
- Poecilipta marengo Raven, 2015 — Australia (New South Wales)
- Poecilipta metallica Raven, 2015 — Australia (Queensland)
- Poecilipta micaelae Raven, 2015 — Australia (New South Wales)
- Poecilipta qunats Raven, 2015 — Australia (Queensland)
- Poecilipta rawlinsonae Raven, 2015 — Australia (Western Australia)
- Poecilipta ruthae Santana & Raven, 2015 — Australia (Queensland)
- Poecilipta samueli Raven, 2015 — Australia (Queensland)
- Poecilipta smaragdinea (Simon, 1909) — Australia (Western Australia)
- Poecilipta tinda Raven, 2015 — Australia (South Australia)
- Poecilipta venusta Rainbow, 1904 — Australia (Queensland to Victoria, South Australia)
- Poecilipta waldockae Raven, 2015 — Australia (Western Australia)
- Poecilipta wallacei Raven, 2015 — Australia (Western Australia to Queensland)
- Poecilipta yambuna Raven, 2015 — Australia (Victoria)
- Poecilipta zbigniewi Raven, 2015 — Australia (Tasmania)

=== Pranburia ===
Pranburia Deeleman-Reinhold, 1993

- Pranburia mahannopi Deeleman-Reinhold, 1993 (type) — Thailand, Cambodia, Laos, Malaysia

=== Procopius ===
Procopius Thorell, 1899

- Procopius aeneolus Simon, 1903 — Equatorial Guinea
- Procopius aethiops Thorell, 1899 (type) — Cameroon
- Procopius affinis Lessert, 1946 — Congo
- Procopius ensifer Simon, 1910 — West Africa, Equatorial Guinea (Bioko)
- Procopius gentilis Simon, 1910 — West Africa
- Procopius granulosus Simon, 1903 — Equatorial Guinea (Bioko, Mbini), Cameroon
- Procopius granulosus helluo Simon, 1910 — Equatorial Guinea (Bioko)
- Procopius laticeps Simon, 1910 — Equatorial Guinea (Bioko)
- Procopius lesserti (Strand, 1916) — Congo, Rwanda
- Procopius luteifemur Schmidt, 1956 — Cameroon
- Procopius vittatus Thorell, 1899 — Cameroon

=== Pronophaea ===
Pronophaea Simon, 1897

- Pronophaea natalica Simon, 1897 (type) — South Africa
- Pronophaea proxima (Lessert, 1923) — South Africa
- Pronophaea vidua (Lessert, 1923) — South Africa

=== Psellocoptus ===
Psellocoptus Simon, 1896

- Psellocoptus buchlii Reiskind, 1971 — Venezuela
- Psellocoptus flavostriatus Simon, 1896 (type) — Venezuela
- Psellocoptus prodontus Reiskind, 1971 — Venezuela

=== Pseudocorinna ===
Pseudocorinna Simon, 1910

- Pseudocorinna alligator Jocqué & Bosselaers, 2011 — Guinea, Liberia, Ivory Coast
- Pseudocorinna amicorum Jocqué & Bosselaers, 2011 — Cameroon
- Pseudocorinna amphibia Jocqué & Bosselaers, 2011 — Ivory Coast
- Pseudocorinna banco Jocqué & Bosselaers, 2011 — Guinea, Ivory Coast
- Pseudocorinna bilobata Jocqué & Bosselaers, 2011 — Togo
- Pseudocorinna brianeno Jocqué & Bosselaers, 2011 — Guinea, Liberia, Ivory Coast
- Pseudocorinna celisi Jocqué & Bosselaers, 2011 — Congo
- Pseudocorinna christae Jocqué & Bosselaers, 2011 — Ivory Coast
- Pseudocorinna cymarum Jocqué & Bosselaers, 2011 — Ghana
- Pseudocorinna doutreleponti Jocqué & Bosselaers, 2011 — Cameroon
- Pseudocorinna eruca Jocqué & Bosselaers, 2011 — Congo
- Pseudocorinna evertsi Jocqué & Bosselaers, 2011 — Ivory Coast
- Pseudocorinna febe Jocqué & Bosselaers, 2011 — Cameroon
- Pseudocorinna felix Jocqué & Bosselaers, 2011 — Ivory Coast
- Pseudocorinna gevaertsi Jocqué & Bosselaers, 2011 — Congo
- Pseudocorinna incisa Jocqué & Bosselaers, 2011 — Gabon
- Pseudocorinna juakalyi Jocqué & Bosselaers, 2011 — Congo
- Pseudocorinna lanius Jocqué & Bosselaers, 2011 — Liberia, Ivory Coast
- Pseudocorinna lobelia Jocqué & Bosselaers, 2011 — Congo
- Pseudocorinna natalis Jocqué & Bosselaers, 2011 — Congo
- Pseudocorinna naufraga Jocqué & Bosselaers, 2011 — Congo
- Pseudocorinna okupe Jocqué & Bosselaers, 2011 — Cameroon
- Pseudocorinna orientalis Jocqué & Bosselaers, 2011 — Congo
- Pseudocorinna perplexa Jocqué & Bosselaers, 2011 — Nigeria
- Pseudocorinna personata Jocqué & Bosselaers, 2011 — Cameroon
- Pseudocorinna rutila Simon, 1910 (type) — Guinea-Bissau
- Pseudocorinna septemaculeata Simon, 1910 — Cameroon, Equatorial Guinea (Bioko)
- Pseudocorinna ubicki Jocqué & Bosselaers, 2011 — Equatorial Guinea (Bioko)
- Pseudocorinna victoria Jocqué & Bosselaers, 2011 — Cameroon

== S ==
=== Scorteccia ===
Scorteccia Caporiacco, 1936

- Scorteccia termitarum Caporiacco, 1936 (type) — Libya

=== Septentrinna ===
Septentrinna Bonaldo, 2000

- Septentrinna bicalcarata (Simon, 1896) (type) — USA, Mexico
- Septentrinna paradoxa (F. O. Pickard-Cambridge, 1899) — Guatemala
- Septentrinna potosi Bonaldo, 2000 — Mexico
- Septentrinna retusa (F. O. Pickard-Cambridge, 1899) — Guatemala
- Septentrinna steckleri (Gertsch, 1936) — USA, Mexico
- Septentrinna yucatan Bonaldo, 2000 — Mexico

=== Serendib ===
Serendib Deeleman-Reinhold, 2001

- Serendib muadai Jäger, Nophaseud & Praxaysombath, 2012 — Laos
- Serendib suthepica Deeleman-Reinhold, 2001 — Thailand, Indonesia (Bali)
- Serendib volans Deeleman-Reinhold, 2001 (type) — Thailand, Indonesia (Borneo)

=== Simonestus ===
Simonestus Bonaldo, 2000

- Simonestus occidentalis (Schenkel, 1953) — Venezuela
- Simonestus pseudobulbulus (Caporiacco, 1938) — Guatemala
- Simonestus robustus (Chickering, 1937) — Panama
- Simonestus semiluna (F. O. Pickard-Cambridge, 1899) — Mexico, Guatemala
- Simonestus separatus (Schmidt, 1971) — Guatemala to Peru
- Simonestus validus (Simon, 1898) (type) — Venezuela

=== Sphecotypus ===
Sphecotypus O. Pickard-Cambridge, 1895

- Sphecotypus birmanicus (Thorell, 1897) — Myanmar
- Sphecotypus borneensis Yamasaki, 2017 — Malaysia (Borneo)
- Sphecotypus niger (Perty, 1833) (type) — Nicaragua to Brazil
- Sphecotypus taprobanicus Simon, 1897 — Sri Lanka

=== Stethorrhagus ===
Stethorrhagus Simon, 1896

- Stethorrhagus archangelus Bonaldo & Brescovit, 1994 — Brazil
- Stethorrhagus chalybeius (L. Koch, 1866) — Colombia
- Stethorrhagus duidae Gertsch, 1942 — Venezuela
- Stethorrhagus hyula Bonaldo & Brescovit, 1994 — Colombia
- Stethorrhagus latoma Bonaldo & Brescovit, 1994 — Venezuela
- Stethorrhagus limbatus Simon, 1896 (type) — Brazil, Guyana
- Stethorrhagus lupulus Simon, 1896 — Colombia, Venezuela, Peru, Brazil
- Stethorrhagus maculatus (L. Koch, 1866) — Colombia
- Stethorrhagus nigrinus (Berland, 1913) — Ecuador
- Stethorrhagus oxossi Bonaldo & Brescovit, 1994 — Brazil
- Stethorrhagus peckorum Bonaldo & Brescovit, 1994 — Venezuela
- Stethorrhagus penai Bonaldo & Brescovit, 1994 — Ecuador
- Stethorrhagus planada Bonaldo & Brescovit, 1994 — Colombia
- Stethorrhagus roraimae Gertsch, 1942 — Brazil
- Stethorrhagus tridentatus Caporiacco, 1955 — Venezuela

== T ==
=== Tapixaua ===
Tapixaua Bonaldo, 2000

- Tapixaua callida Bonaldo, 2000 (type) — Brazil, Peru

=== Ticopa ===
Ticopa Raven, 2015

- Ticopa australis Raven, 2015 (type) — Australia
- Ticopa carnarvon Raven, 2015 — Australia (Western Australia)
- Ticopa chinchilla Raven, 2015 — Australia (Queensland)
- Ticopa dingo Raven, 2015 — Australia (Queensland)
- Ticopa hudsoni Raven, 2015 — Australia (Queensland, New South Wales)
- Ticopa longbottomi Raven, 2015 — Australia (Western Australia)

=== Tupirinna ===
Tupirinna Bonaldo, 2000

- Tupirinna albofasciata (Mello-Leitão, 1943) — Brazil
- Tupirinna rosae Bonaldo, 2000 (type) — Venezuela, Brazil
- Tupirinna trilineata (Chickering, 1937) — Panama

== V ==
=== Vendaphaea ===
Vendaphaea Haddad, 2009

- Vendaphaea lajuma Haddad, 2009 (type) — South Africa

== W ==
=== Wasaka ===
Wasaka Haddad, 2013

- Wasaka imitatrix Haddad, 2013 — Tanzania
- Wasaka montana Haddad, 2013 — Burundi, Rwanda, Uganda
- Wasaka occulta Haddad, 2013 (type) — Tanzania
- Wasaka ventralis Haddad, 2013 — Cameroon

== X ==
=== Xeropigo ===
Xeropigo O. Pickard-Cambridge, 1882

- Xeropigo aitatu Carvalho, Shimano, Candiani & Bonaldo, 2016 — Brazil
- Xeropigo brescoviti De Souza & Bonaldo, 2007 — Bolivia
- Xeropigo cajuina Carvalho, Shimano, Candiani & Bonaldo, 2016 — Brazil
- Xeropigo camilae De Souza & Bonaldo, 2007 — Brazil
- Xeropigo candango De Souza & Bonaldo, 2007 — Brazil
- Xeropigo canga Carvalho, Shimano, Candiani & Bonaldo, 2016 — Brazil
- Xeropigo cotijuba De Souza & Bonaldo, 2007 — Guiana, Brazil
- Xeropigo crispim Carvalho, Shimano, Candiani & Bonaldo, 2016 — Brazil
- Xeropigo oxente Carvalho, Shimano, Candiani & Bonaldo, 2016 — Brazil
- Xeropigo pachitea De Souza & Bonaldo, 2007 — Peru, Brazil
- Xeropigo perene De Souza & Bonaldo, 2007 — Peru, Brazil
- Xeropigo piripiri Carvalho, Shimano, Candiani & Bonaldo, 2016 — Brazil
- Xeropigo rheimsae De Souza & Bonaldo, 2007 — Brazil
- Xeropigo smedigari (Caporiacco, 1955) — Venezuela, Trinidad
- Xeropigo tridentiger (O. Pickard-Cambridge, 1870) (type) — USA, Caribbean to Brazil, St. Helena
- Xeropigo tridentiger reichardti (Strand, 1916) — Cayman Is. (Grand Cayman)
- Xeropigo ufo Carvalho, Shimano, Candiani & Bonaldo, 2016 — Brazil
