= Paramedmassa =

Scientific classification
- Kingdom: Animalia
- Phylum: Arthropoda
- Subphylum: Chelicerata
- Class: Arachnida
- Order: Araneae
- Infraorder: Araneomorphae
- Family: Corinnidae
- Genus: Paramedmassa; Jin, H. Zhang & F. Zhang, 2019
- Species: P. day

Binomial name
- Paramedmassa day (Dankittipakul & Singtripop, 2014)

Genus of spiders

Paramedmassa is a monotypic genus of Asian corinnid sac spiders containing the single species, Paramedmassa day. The genus was erected by C. Jin, H. L. Zhang, and F. Zhang in 2019 for a single species previously placed in Allomedmassa. The fourth section of the first legs can have anywhere from five to ten spines, depending on locale. Jin and Zhang propose that the morphological variance could indicate multiple species, but more individuals will need to be found and studied before a solid conclusion can be reached.

== See also ==
- Allomedmassa
