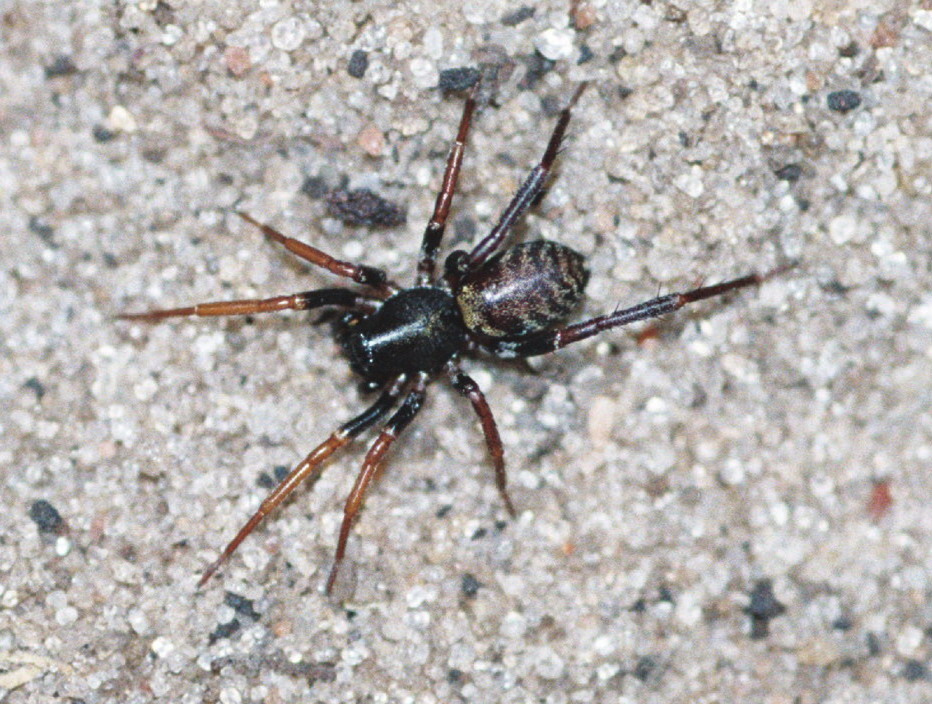
- female
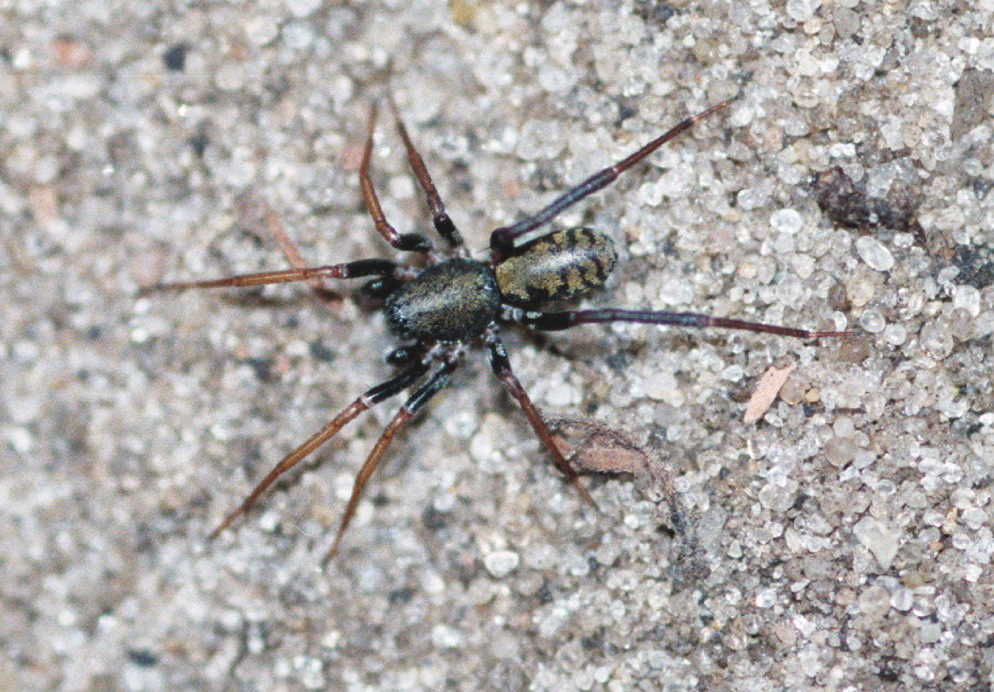
- male

Conservation status
- Least Concern (SANBI Red List)

Scientific classification
- Kingdom: Animalia
- Phylum: Arthropoda
- Subphylum: Chelicerata
- Class: Arachnida
- Order: Araneae
- Infraorder: Araneomorphae
- Family: Corinnidae
- Genus: Cambalida
- Species: C. dippenaarae

Binomial name
- Cambalida dippenaarae Haddad, 2012

= Cambalida dippenaarae =

Dippenaar's Cambalida Dark Sac Spider

Species of spider

Cambalida dippenaarae is a species of spider in the family Corinnidae. It is distributed across several southern African countries and is commonly known as Dippenaar's Cambalida dark sac spider.

== Etymology ==
The species is named after Ansie Dippenaar-Schoeman, a prominent South African arachnologist who has made significant contributions to the study of southern African spiders.

== Distribution ==
Cambalida dippenaarae is distributed across Zambia, Botswana, Mozambique, Zimbabwe, Namibia and South Africa. In South Africa, it is known from eight provinces at altitudes ranging from 3 to 1,560 m above sea level, including more than 10 protected areas.

== Habitat and ecology ==
The species is a free-living ground-dweller. It is fairly common and collected by litter sifting and pitfall traps in forest and savanna habitats, and occasionally from the Grassland, Indian Ocean Coastal Belt and Nama Karoo biomes. The species has also been sampled from citrus and grapefruit orchards and cotton and maize fields.

== Description ==
Cambalida dippenaarae is known from both sexes. The carapace is deep red-brown with black mottling, with the clypeus dark brown medially and yellow-brown laterally. The eye region is nearly black with faint black striae radiating from the fovea towards the pedipalps and leg coxae. The surface is granulate and sparsely covered in white plumose setae, with all eyes surrounded by black rings.

The legs are finely granulate with femora I–IV dark brown. The opisthosoma is dark grey, with a large dark red-brown dorsal scutum. The abdomen displays fine cream chevrons posteriorly and a small white spot of dense plumose setae just above the spinnerets.

== Conservation ==
Cambalida dippenaarae is listed as Least Concern due to its wide geographical range. The species is recorded from several protected areas across its range.

== Taxonomy ==
Cambalida dippenaarae was described by Charles R. Haddad in 2012 from Zambia. The genus Cambalida was revised by Haddad in 2012.
