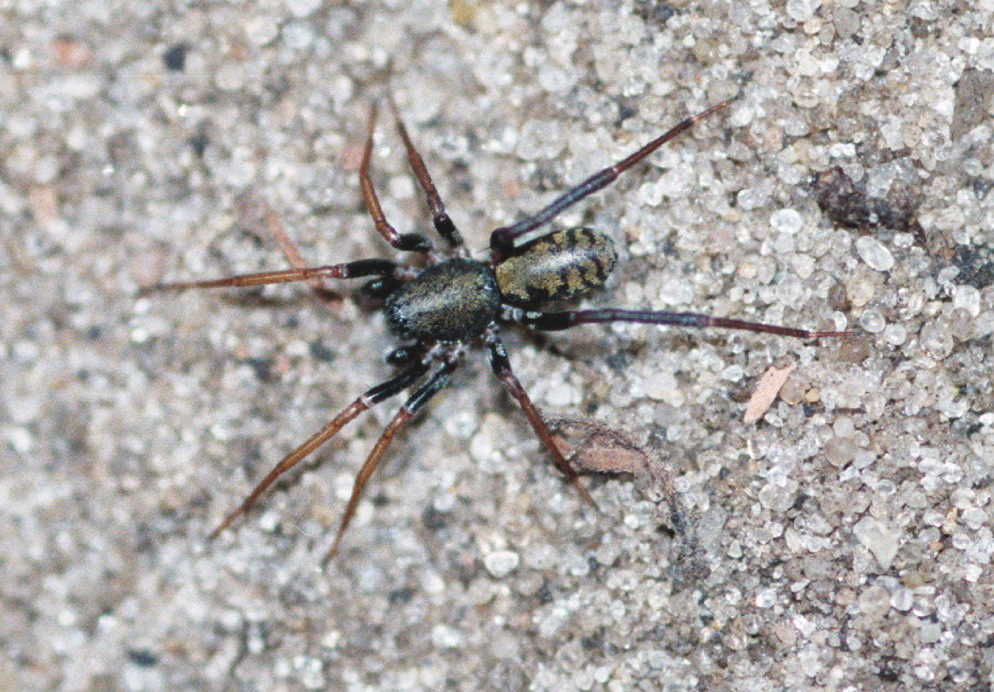
- C. dippenaarae (male)
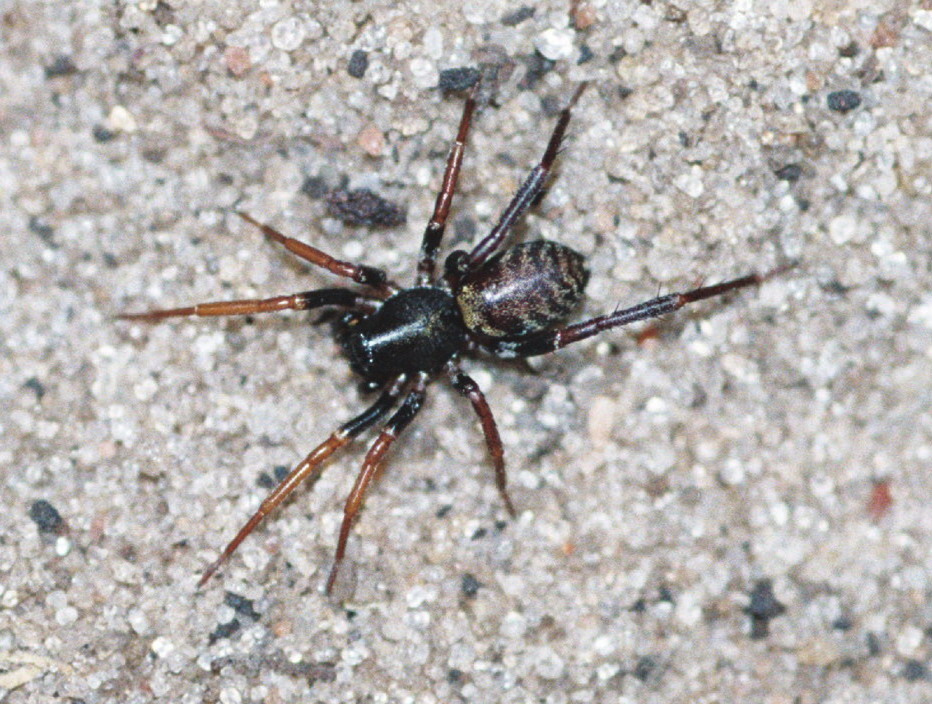
- C. dippenaarae (female)

Scientific classification
- Kingdom: Animalia
- Phylum: Arthropoda
- Subphylum: Chelicerata
- Class: Arachnida
- Order: Araneae
- Infraorder: Araneomorphae
- Family: Corinnidae
- Genus: Cambalida; Simon, 1910

Species
- 14, see text

= Cambalida =

Genus of spiders

Cambalida is a genus of corinnid sac spiders first described by Eugène Simon in 1910.

== Species ==
As of October 2025, this genus includes fifteen species:

- Cambalida compressa Haddad, 2012 – Ivory Coast, Burkina Faso, Togo, Nigeria
- Cambalida coriacea Simon, 1909 – Guinea, Sierra Leone, Liberia, Ivory Coast, Ghana, Nigeria, Cameroon, Gabon, DR Congo
- Cambalida deminuta (Simon, 1909) – Liberia, Ivory Coast, Togo, Cameroon, Central Africa Rep. Gabon, DR Congo, Uganda, Rwanda, Angola
- Cambalida deorsa Murthappa, Prajapati, Sankaran & Sebastian, 2016 – India
- Cambalida dhupgadensis Bodkhe, Uniyal & Kamble, 2016 – India
- Cambalida dippenaarae Haddad, 2012 – Zambia, Namibia, Botswana, Zimbabwe, Mozambique, South Africa
- Cambalida fagei (Caporiacco, 1939) – Ethiopia
- Cambalida flavipes (Gravely, 1931) – India
- Cambalida fulvipes (Simon, 1896) – Sub-Saharan Africa
- Cambalida griswoldi Haddad, 2012 – Madagascar
- Cambalida kambakamensis (Gravely, 1931) – India
- Cambalida lineata Haddad, 2012 – Madagascar
- Cambalida loricifera (Simon, 1886) – Senegal
- Cambalida tuma Murthappa, Prajapati, Sankaran & Sebastian, 2016 – India
- Cambalida unica Haddad, 2012 – Cameroon
