= Ecitocobius =

Scientific classification
- Domain: Eukaryota
- Kingdom: Animalia
- Phylum: Arthropoda
- Subphylum: Chelicerata
- Class: Arachnida
- Order: Araneae
- Infraorder: Araneomorphae
- Family: Corinnidae
- Genus: Ecitocobius; Bonaldo & Brescovit, 1998
- Species: E. comissator

Binomial name
- Ecitocobius comissator Bonaldo & Brescovit, 1998

Genus of spiders

Ecitocobius is a monotypic genus of South American corinnid sac spiders containing the single species, Ecitocobius comissator. It was first described by A. B. Bonaldo & Antônio Brescovit in 1998, and has only been found in Brazil.
