= Cambalida fulvipes =

Common Cambalida Dark Sac Spider

Conservation status
- Least Concern (SANBI Red List)

Scientific classification
- Kingdom: Animalia
- Phylum: Arthropoda
- Subphylum: Chelicerata
- Class: Arachnida
- Order: Araneae
- Infraorder: Araneomorphae
- Family: Corinnidae
- Genus: Cambalida
- Species: C. fulvipes

Binomial name
- Cambalida fulvipes (Simon, 1896)

Synonyms
- Castaneira fulvipes Simon, 1896; Castianeira depygata Strand, 1916; Castianeira mestrali Lessert, 1921

Species of spider

Cambalida fulvipes is a species of spider in the family Corinnidae. It is widely distributed throughout the Afrotropical Region and is commonly known as Common Cambalida dark sac spider.

== Distribution ==
Cambalida fulvipes is widely distributed throughout the Afrotropical Region. In South Africa, it is known from all nine provinces at altitudes ranging from 16 to 1,722 m above sea level.

== Habitat and ecology ==
The species is a free-living ground-dweller that occupies the greatest range of habitats among Cambalida species, including tropical and temperate forests and the Savanna, Grassland, Indian Ocean Coastal Belt, Nama Karoo and Fynbos biomes. The species has also been sampled from maize fields and pistachio orchards.

== Description ==
Cambalida fulvipes is known from both sexes and was redescribed by Haddad in 2012.

== Conservation ==
Cambalida fulvipes is listed as Least Concern due to its wide geographical range. The species is protected in several protected areas including De Hoop Nature Reserve, Erfenis Dam Nature Reserve and the Amanzi Private Game Reserve.

== Taxonomy ==
Cambalida fulvipes was originally described by Eugène Simon in 1896 from Gauteng, South Africa as Castaneira fulvipes. The species was transferred to Cambalida by Haddad in 2012, who synonymized Castianeira depygata and C. mestrali with this species.
