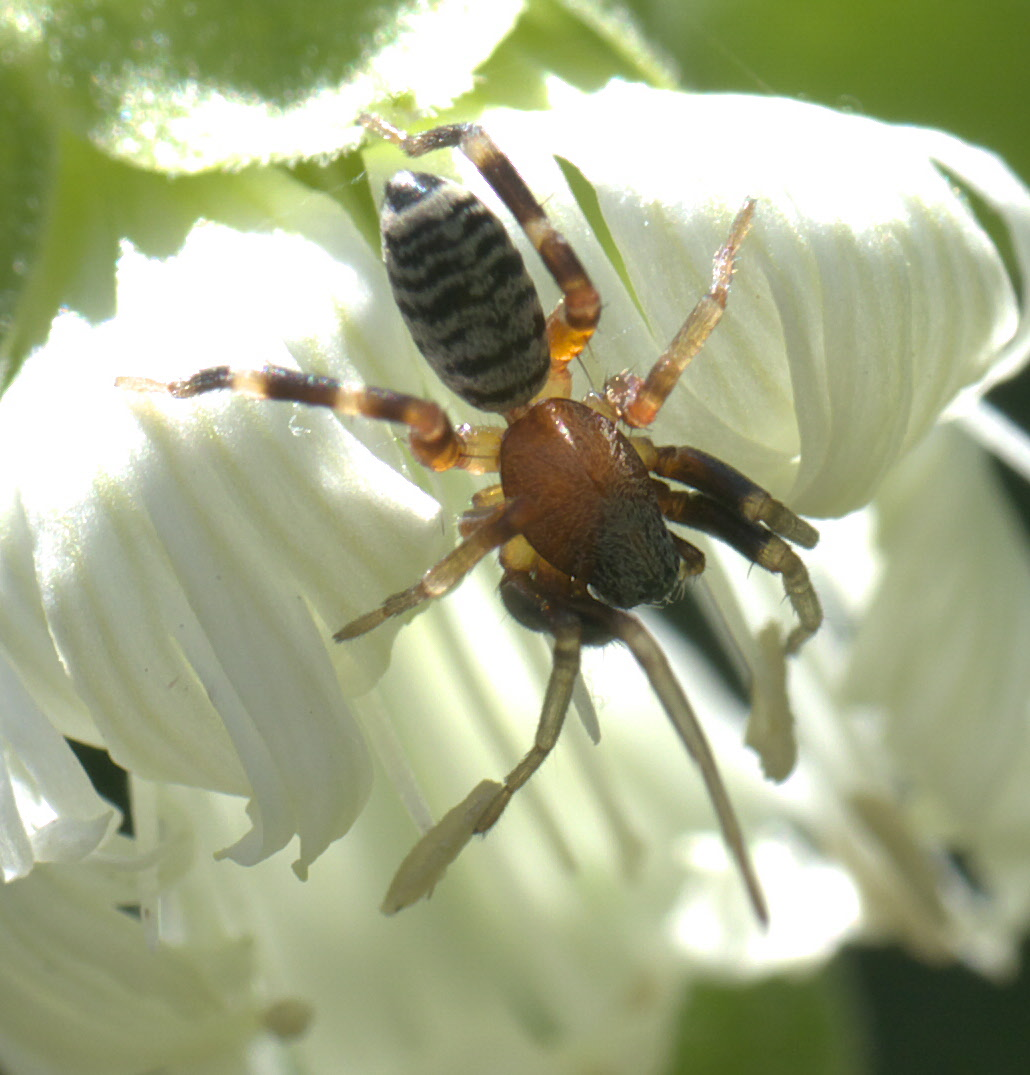
- Castianeira variata on a white flower, Pryor, Oklahoma

Scientific classification
- Domain: Eukaryota
- Kingdom: Animalia
- Phylum: Arthropoda
- Subphylum: Chelicerata
- Class: Arachnida
- Order: Araneae
- Infraorder: Araneomorphae
- Family: Corinnidae
- Genus: Castianeira
- Species: C. variata

Binomial name
- Castianeira variata Gertsch, 1942

= Castianeira variata =

Species of spider

Castianeira variata is a species of spider in the family Corinnidae, found in North and Central America. The body length is typically 7 to 9 mm, the females being larger. Castianeira variata is similar in general appearance to C. longipalpus. The carapace dark reddish brown to nearly black with thin white hairs, darker on the sides.
