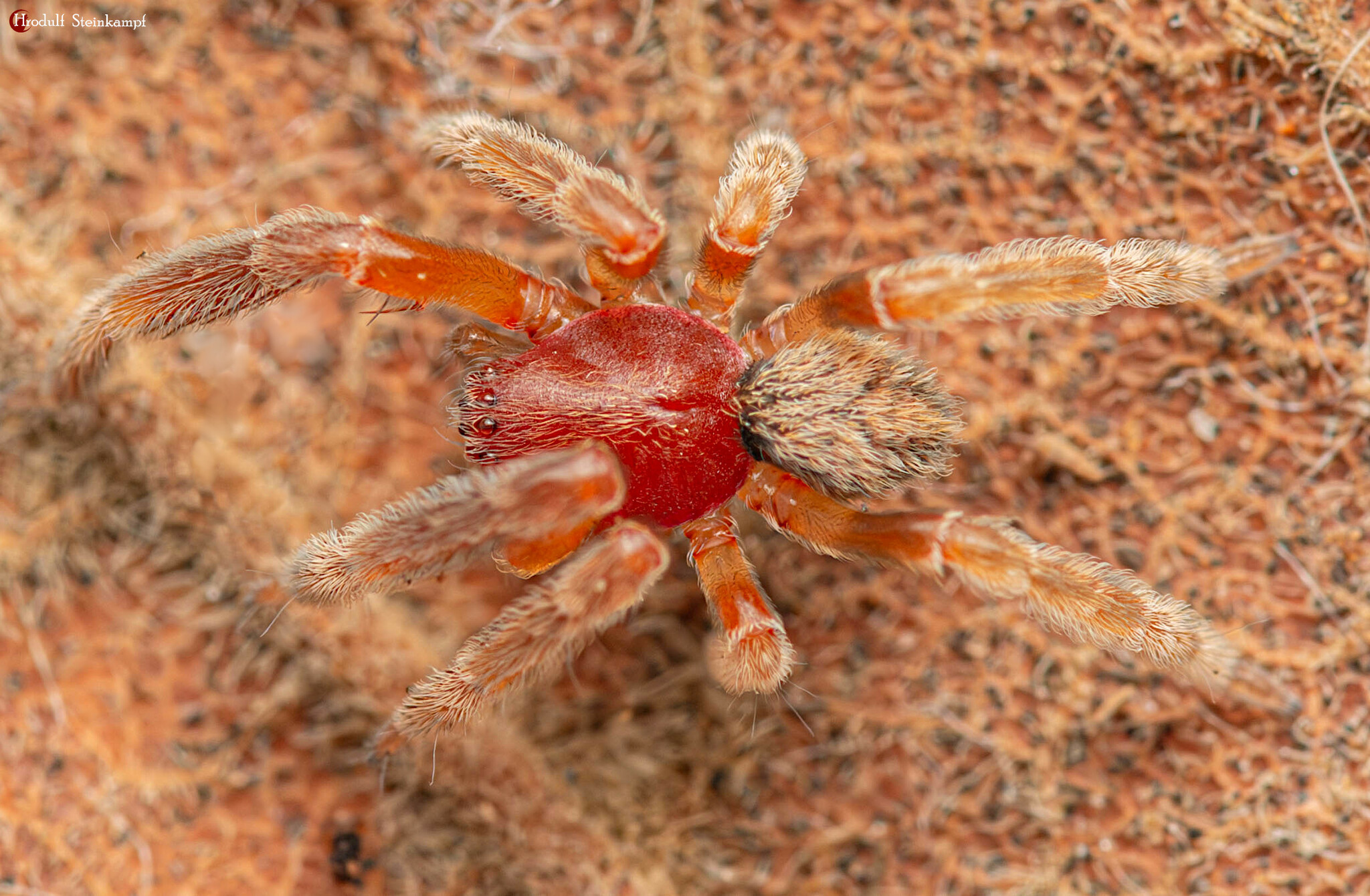
- juvenile from North West Province
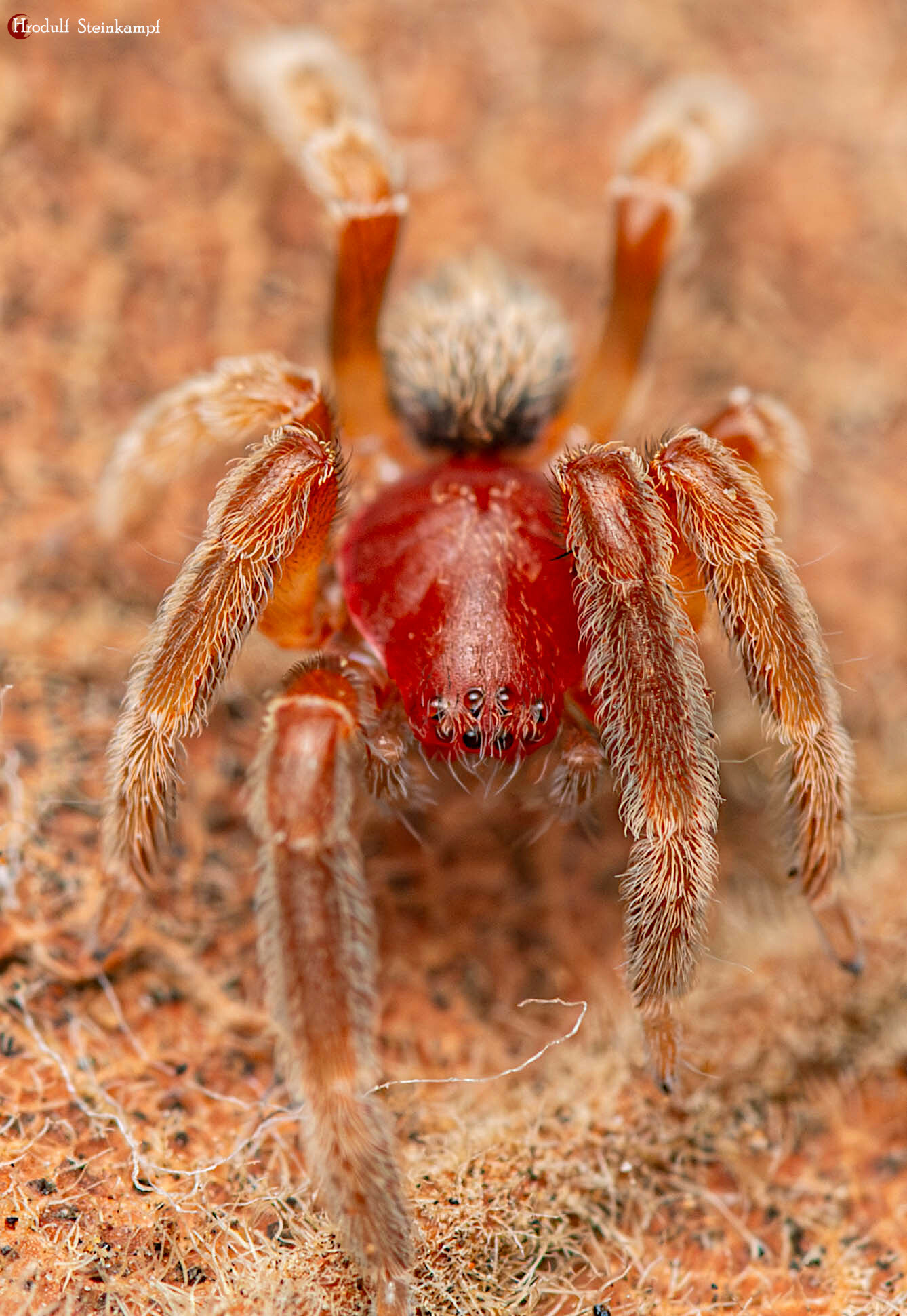
- juvenile

Scientific classification
- Kingdom: Animalia
- Phylum: Arthropoda
- Subphylum: Chelicerata
- Class: Arachnida
- Order: Araneae
- Infraorder: Araneomorphae
- Family: Corinnidae
- Genus: Vendaphaea
- Species: V. lajuma

Binomial name
- Vendaphaea lajuma Haddad, 2009

= Vendaphaea =

Furry-legged dark sac spider

Genus of spiders

Vendaphaea is a monotypic genus of African corinnid sac spiders containing the single species, Vendaphaea lajuma. It was first described by Charles R. Haddad in 2009, and has only been found in South Africa. It is commonly known as the Furry-legged dark sac spider.

== Distribution ==
Vendaphaea lajuma is endemic to South Africa, known only from Limpopo Province at Lhuvhondo Nature Reserve, Bela-Bela and Naboomspruit.

== Habitat and ecology ==
This species is a free-running ground-dweller that has been sampled from the leaf litter of mixed woodland and forest habitats, as well as forests, woodlands and grassland patches in the Soutpansberg.

It has also been found at the bases of grass tussocks in the Savanna biome at altitudes ranging from 1,172 to 1,605 m above sea level.

== Description ==
This genus can be recognized from other corinnids by the closely spaced posterior median eyes, densely setose and strongly spined anterior legs, and the uniquely shaped female epigyne and palpal morphology.

These are medium-sized spiders, measuring 6.03–7.85 mm in length. The carapace is oval with a narrow eye region and distinct fovea. The posterior margin is slightly concave. The carapace is red-brown, densely setose, with a finely granulate surface.

The opisthosoma is densely covered in short mottled grey-brown setae, with short black dorsal chevron markings that each end in a white spot. A dorsal scutum is absent in both sexes.

== Conservation ==
Vendaphaea lajuma is listed as Data Deficient by the South African National Biodiversity Institute as it is under-collected and more sampling is needed to determine its range. There are no known threats to the species.

== Taxonomy ==
The species was described by Haddad in 2009 from Lhuvhondo Nature Reserve (formerly Lajuma Mountain Retreat). It is known from both sexes.
