= Leptopicia =

Scientific classification
- Kingdom: Animalia
- Phylum: Arthropoda
- Subphylum: Chelicerata
- Class: Arachnida
- Order: Araneae
- Infraorder: Araneomorphae
- Family: Corinnidae
- Genus: Leptopicia
- Species: L. bimaculata

Binomial name
- Leptopicia bimaculata (Simon, 1896)

Genus of spiders

Leptopicia is a genus of spiders in the family Corinnidae. It was first described in 2015 by Raven. As of 2017, it contains only one species, Leptopicia bimaculata, found in Australia.
