= Scorteccia =

Scientific classification
- Kingdom: Animalia
- Phylum: Arthropoda
- Subphylum: Chelicerata
- Class: Arachnida
- Order: Araneae
- Infraorder: Araneomorphae
- Family: Corinnidae
- Genus: Scorteccia; Caporiacco, 1936
- Species: S. termitarum

Binomial name
- Scorteccia termitarum Caporiacco, 1936

Genus of spiders

Scorteccia is a monotypic genus of North African corinnid sac spiders containing the single species, Scorteccia termitarum. It was first described by Lodovico di Caporiacco in 1936, and has only been found in Libya.
