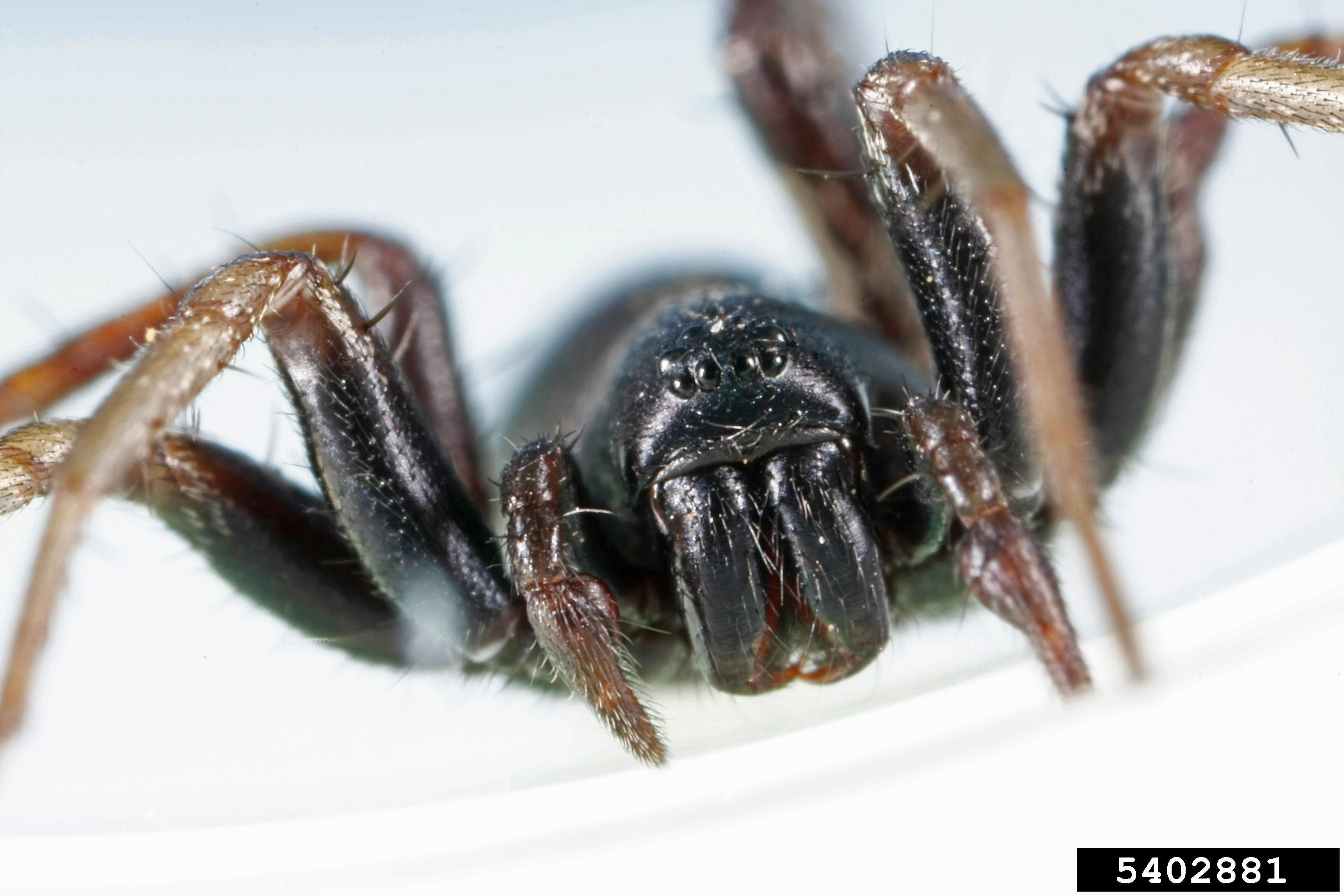

Conservation status
- Secure (NatureServe)

Scientific classification
- Kingdom: Animalia
- Phylum: Arthropoda
- Subphylum: Chelicerata
- Class: Arachnida
- Order: Araneae
- Infraorder: Araneomorphae
- Family: Corinnidae
- Genus: Castianeira
- Species: C. descripta

Binomial name
- Castianeira descripta (Hentz, 1847)

= Castianeira descripta =

Species of spider

Castianeira descripta, the redspotted antmimic, is a species of true spider in the family Corinnidae. It is found in the United States and Canada.

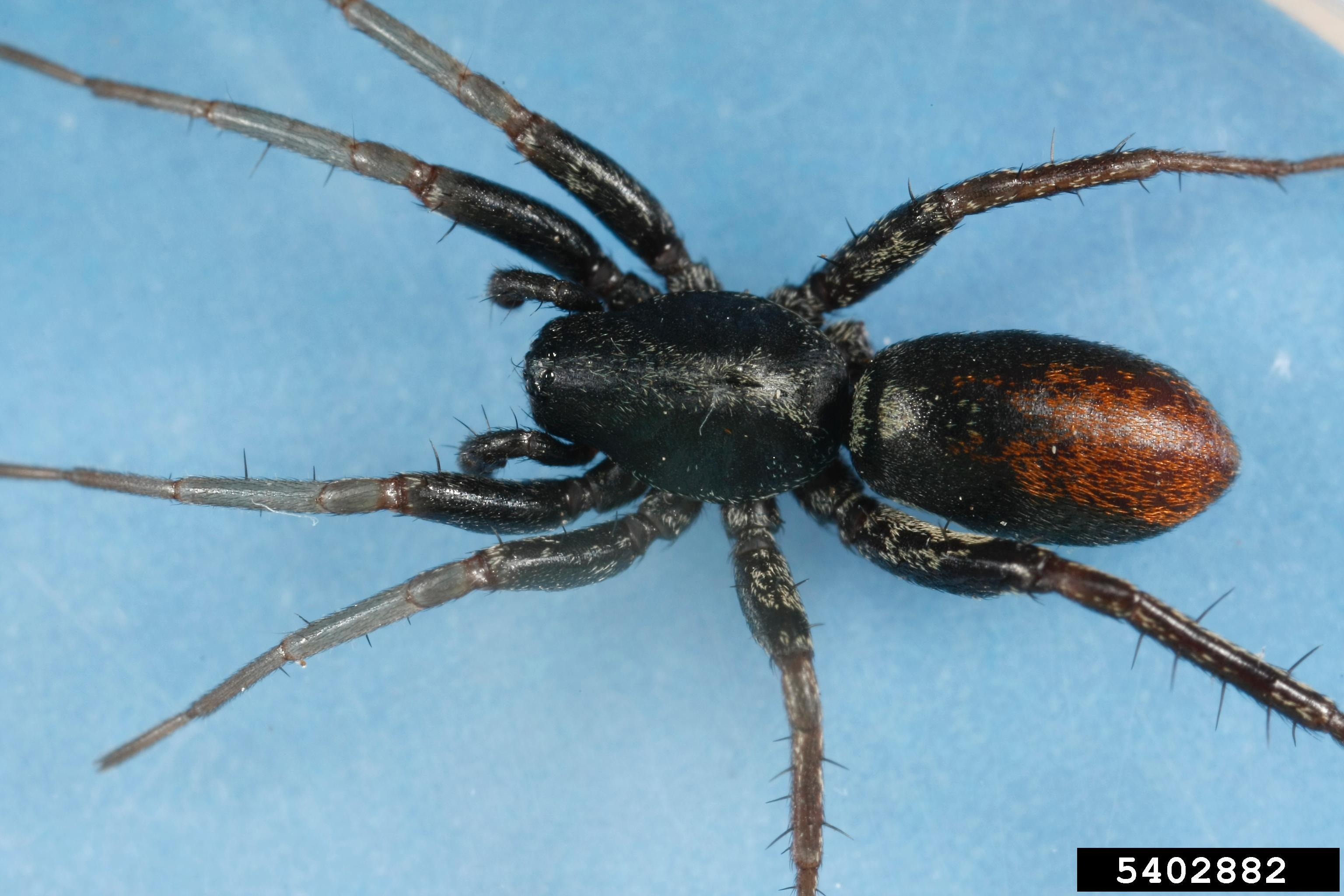
Redspotted antmimic, Castianeira descripta

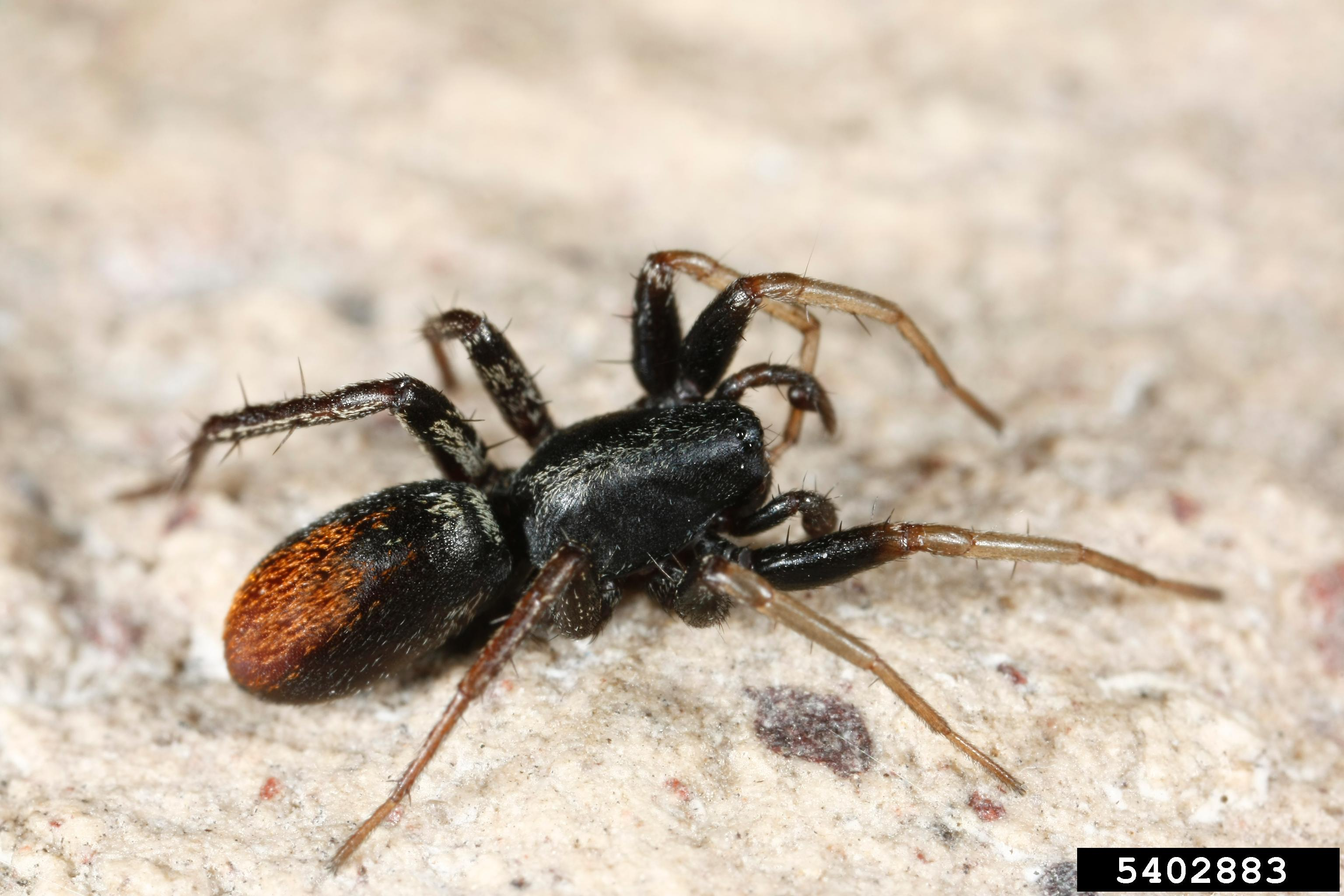
Redspotted antmimic, Castianeira descripta
