= Melanesotypus =

Scientific classification
- Domain: Eukaryota
- Kingdom: Animalia
- Phylum: Arthropoda
- Subphylum: Chelicerata
- Class: Arachnida
- Order: Araneae
- Infraorder: Araneomorphae
- Family: Corinnidae
- Genus: Melanesotypus
- Species: M. guadal

Binomial name
- Melanesotypus guadal Raven, 2015

Genus of spiders

Melanesotypus is a genus of spiders in the family Corinnidae. It was first described in 2015 by Raven. As of 2017, it contains only one species, Melanesotypus guadal, from the Solomon Islands.
