= Arushina =

Scientific classification
- Domain: Eukaryota
- Kingdom: Animalia
- Phylum: Arthropoda
- Subphylum: Chelicerata
- Class: Arachnida
- Order: Araneae
- Infraorder: Araneomorphae
- Family: Corinnidae
- Genus: Arushina; Caporiacco, 1947
- Species: A. dentichelis

Binomial name
- Arushina dentichelis Caporiacco, 1947

Genus of spiders

Arushina is a monotypic genus of East African corinnid sac spiders containing the single species, Arushina dentichelis. It was first described by Lodovico di Caporiacco in 1947, and has only been found in Tanzania. Originally placed with the Dictynidae, it was moved to the Ant spiders in 1967, to the Sac spiders in 1991, then to the Corrinid sac spiders in 2000.
