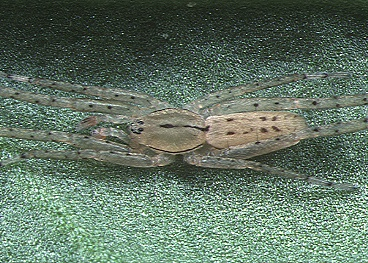
- H. takeuchii

Scientific classification
- Domain: Eukaryota
- Kingdom: Animalia
- Phylum: Arthropoda
- Subphylum: Chelicerata
- Class: Arachnida
- Order: Araneae
- Infraorder: Araneomorphae
- Family: Corinnidae
- Genus: Humua
- Species: H. takeuchii

Binomial name
- Humua takeuchii Ono, 1987
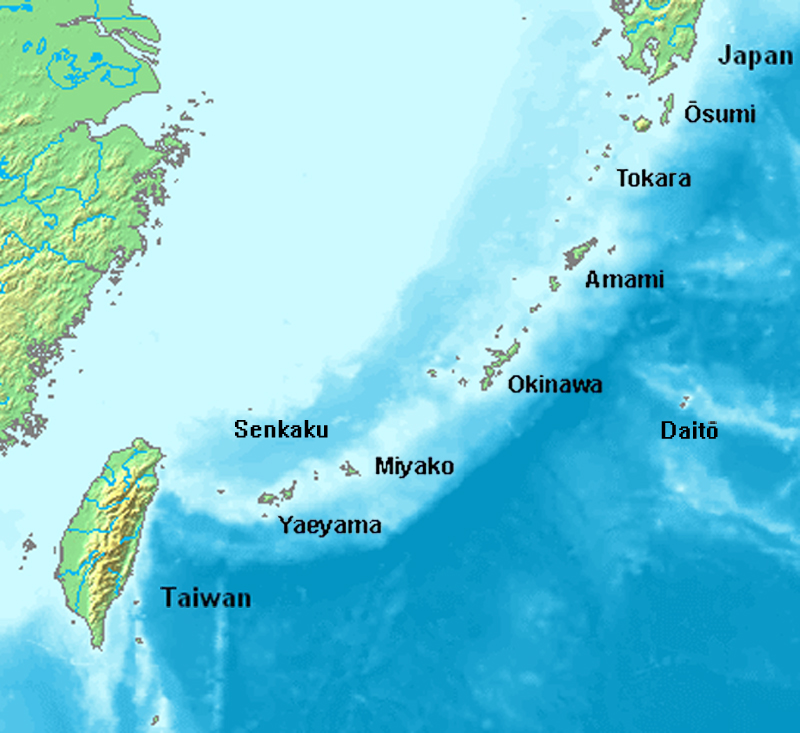

= Humua =

Genus of spiders

Humua is a genus of corinnid sac spiders containing the single species, Humua takeuchii. It was first described by H. Ono in 1987, and is only found in Japan's Ryukyu Islands.
