= Tapixaua =

Scientific classification
- Domain: Eukaryota
- Kingdom: Animalia
- Phylum: Arthropoda
- Subphylum: Chelicerata
- Class: Arachnida
- Order: Araneae
- Infraorder: Araneomorphae
- Family: Corinnidae
- Genus: Tapixaua; Bonaldo, 2000
- Species: T. callida

Binomial name
- Tapixaua callida Bonaldo, 2000

Genus of spiders

Tapixaua is a monotypic genus of South American corinnid sac spiders containing the single species, Tapixaua callida. Both male and female were first described by A. B. Bonaldo in 2000, and has only been found in Brazil and Peru.
