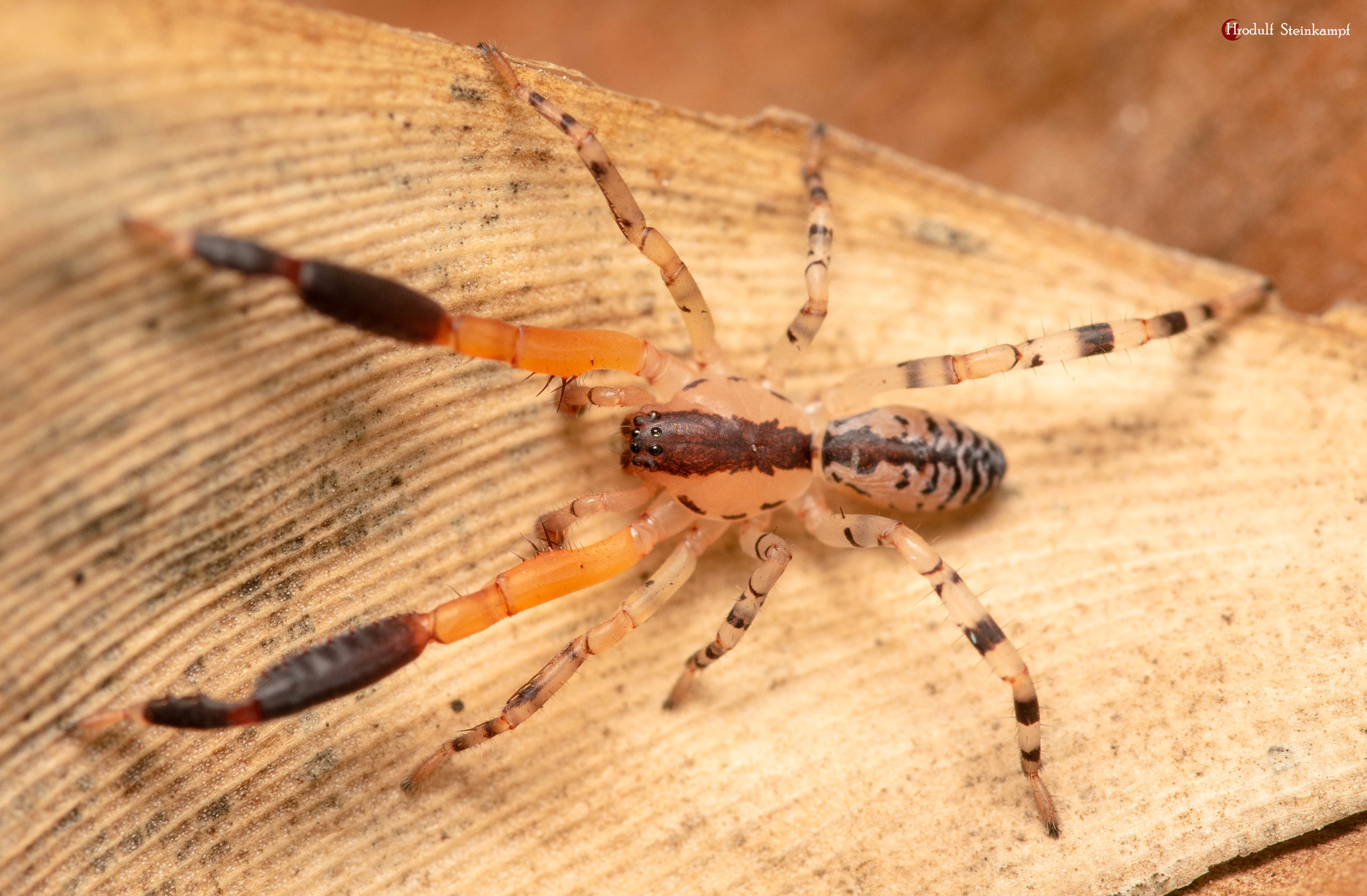
- male A. zebra
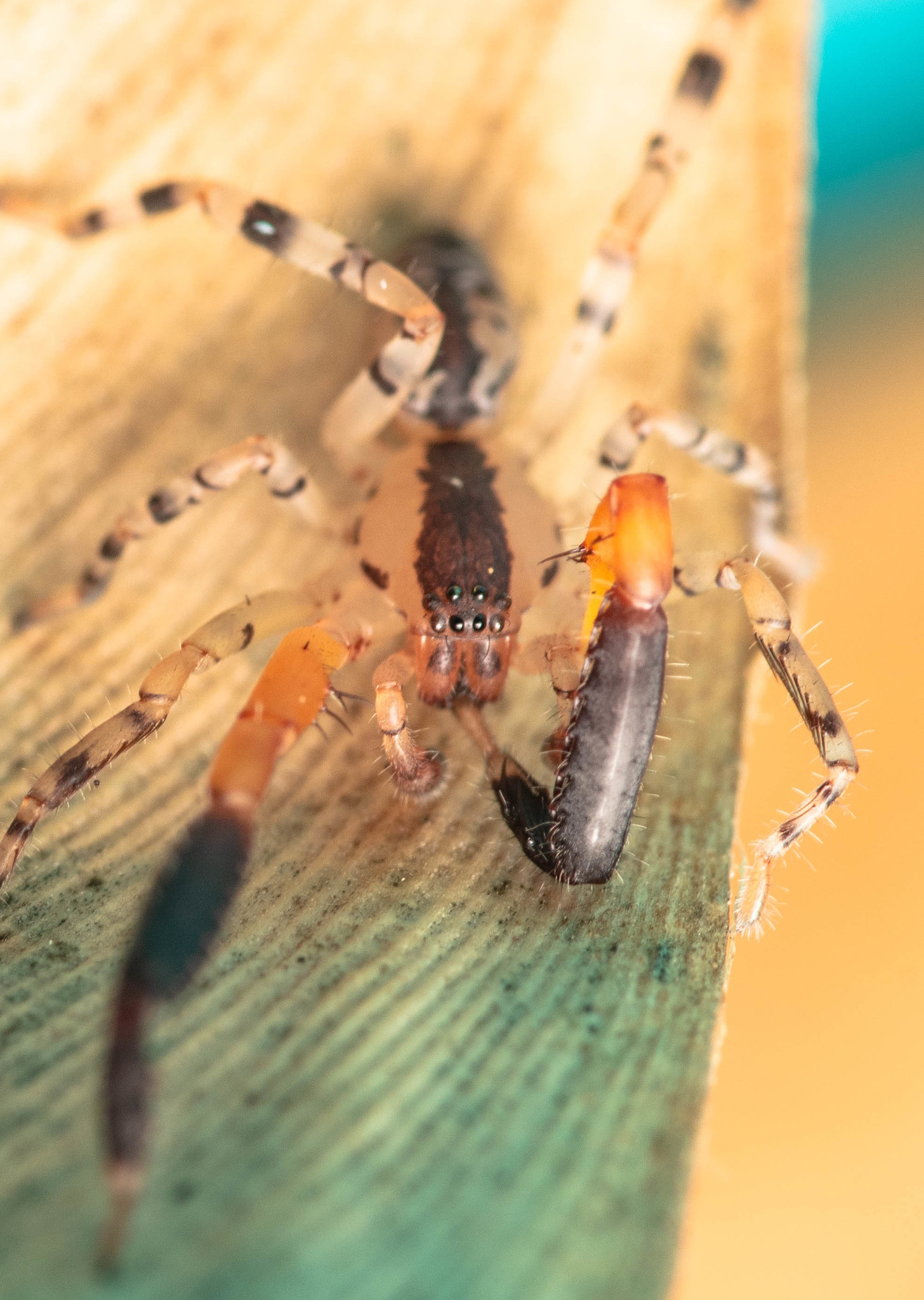
- male A. zebra

Scientific classification
- Kingdom: Animalia
- Phylum: Arthropoda
- Subphylum: Chelicerata
- Class: Arachnida
- Order: Araneae
- Infraorder: Araneomorphae
- Family: Corinnidae
- Genus: Austrophaea; Lawrence, 1952
- Species: A. zebra

Binomial name
- Austrophaea zebra Lawrence, 1952

Synonyms
- Austrophaea festiva Lawrence, 1952

= Austrophaea =

Genus of spiders

Austrophaea is a monotypic genus of African corinnid sac spiders containing the single species, Austrophaea zebra. It was first described by R. F. Lawrence in 1952, and has only been found in South Africa.

== Distribution ==
Austrophaea zebra is endemic to South Africa and is known from the Eastern Cape and KwaZulu-Natal provinces at altitudes ranging from 47 to 696 m above sea level.

== Habitat and ecology ==
The species is known only from low-lying grasslands, savanna and coastal forests in the eastern parts of South Africa. Austrophaea zebra is exclusively ground-dwelling and has been collected from leaf litter between grasses in the ecotone between coastal forests and adjacent grassland. The species has been sampled from the Thicket, Indian Ocean Coastal Belt and Savanna biomes.

== Description ==
Austrophaea zebra can be easily recognized by its very robust anterior legs, particularly the tibiae and metatarsi, which are enlarged, broad, and very strongly spined ventrally. The carapace is somewhat flattened with a median black longitudinal stripe, and the opisthosoma bears a black median stripe and 5–7 posterior transverse chevron markings.

The carapace is slightly convex and somewhat flattened, pale cream-yellow to deep yellow-orange, with a broad median dark brown mottled stripe extending from the anterior eye row to the posterior margin of the carapace. Dark brown spots are present laterally at the bases of coxae II, III and IV. All eyes have black rings.

The abdomen is oval-elongate, with a narrow brown dorsal scutum extending to two-thirds, and a black median stripe dividing into several transverse chevron markings posteriorly. Leg I is robust, with yellow femora, patellae and tarsi, and black tibiae and metatarsi. The remaining legs are shorter, cream-colored, with black bands.

== Conservation ==
Austrophaea zebra is listed as Least Concern due to its wide geographic range. The species is threatened by loss of habitat for crop farming and infrastructure development but has been recorded from several protected areas.

== Taxonomy ==
Austrophaea zebra was described by R. F. Lawrence in 1952 from Tongaat in KwaZulu-Natal. It is the type species of the monotypic genus Austrophaea, which is endemic to South Africa. The species was revised by Haddad in 2007, who synonymized Austrophaea festiva with A. zebra.
