= Allomedmassa =

Scientific classification
- Domain: Eukaryota
- Kingdom: Animalia
- Phylum: Arthropoda
- Subphylum: Chelicerata
- Class: Arachnida
- Order: Araneae
- Infraorder: Araneomorphae
- Family: Corinnidae
- Genus: Allomedmassa; Singtripop

Species
- Allomedmassa day Dankittipakul & Singtripop, 2014; Allomedmassa deelemanae Dankittipakul & Singtripop, 2014; Allomedmassa mae Dankittipakul & Singtripop, 2014

Genus of spiders

Allomedmassa is a genus of spiders in the family Corinnidae. It was first described in 2014 by Dankittipakul & Singtripop. As of 2016 it contains 3 species, all from southeast Asia.
