= Megalostrata =

Megalostrata may refer to:

- Megalostrata (poet)
- Megalostrata (spider), a genus of spider family Corinnidae
