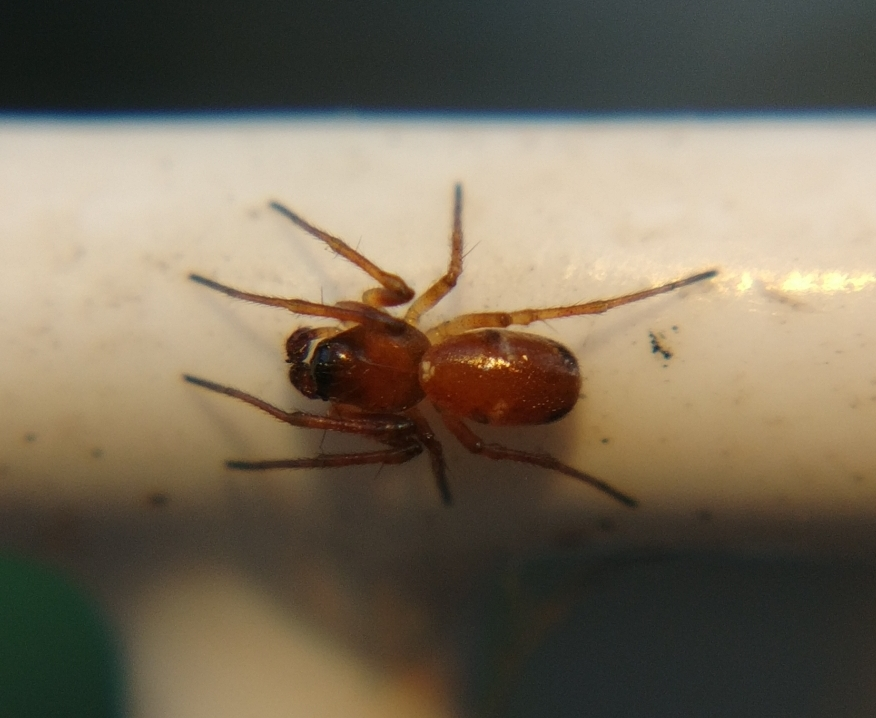
- male Wangaraneus sp. from Thailand

Scientific classification
- Kingdom: Animalia
- Phylum: Arthropoda
- Subphylum: Chelicerata
- Class: Arachnida
- Order: Araneae
- Infraorder: Araneomorphae
- Family: Araneidae
- Genus: Wangaraneus; Mi, Wang & Li, 2024

Type species
- W. yequ Mi, Wang & Li, 2024

Species
- 3, see text

= Wangaraneus =

Genus of spiders

Wangaraneus is a genus of spiders in the family Araneidae.

== Distribution ==
Wangaraneus is known from China and Vietnam.

== Etymology ==
The genus is named after Chinese arachnologist Fengzhen Wang (Chinese: 王凤振; pinyin: Wáng fèngzhèn), in combination with the related genus Araneus.

The monotypic genus of corinnid spiders Fengzhen is named after Wang as well.

The type species W. yequ is named after Taiwanese singer Jay Chou's song Chinese: 夜曲; pinyin: Yèqǔ ("nocturne").

== Species ==
As of October 2025, this genus includes three species:

- Wangaraneus ryani (Mi, Wang & Li, 2024) – Vietnam
- Wangaraneus yequ Mi, Wang & Li, 2024 – China (type species)
- Wangaraneus zioni (Mi, Li & Pham, 2023) – China, Vietnam
