= Procopius (spider) =

Scientific classification
- Domain: Eukaryota
- Kingdom: Animalia
- Phylum: Arthropoda
- Subphylum: Chelicerata
- Class: Arachnida
- Order: Araneae
- Infraorder: Araneomorphae
- Family: Corinnidae
- Genus: Procopius; Thorell, 1899

Type species
- P. aethiops Thorell, 1899

Species
- 11, see text

Genus of spiders

Procopius is a genus of African corinnid sac spiders first described by Tamerlan Thorell in 1899.

== Species ==
As of April 2019 it contains eleven species:

- Procopius aeneolus Simon, 1903 – Equatorial Guinea
- Procopius aethiops Thorell, 1899 (type) – Cameroon
- Procopius affinis Lessert, 1946 – Congo
- Procopius ensifer Simon, 1910 – West Africa, Equatorial Guinea (Bioko)
- Procopius gentilis Simon, 1910 – West Africa
- Procopius granulosus Simon, 1903 – Equatorial Guinea (Bioko, Mbini), Cameroon
  - Procopius g. helluo Simon, 1910 – Equatorial Guinea (Bioko)
- Procopius laticeps Simon, 1910 – Equatorial Guinea (Bioko)
- Procopius lesserti (Strand, 1916) – Congo, Rwanda
- Procopius luteifemur Schmidt, 1956 – Cameroon
- Procopius vittatus Thorell, 1899 – Cameroon
