= Procopius aeneolus =

Scientific classification
- Kingdom: Animalia
- Phylum: Arthropoda
- Subphylum: Chelicerata
- Class: Arachnida
- Order: Araneae
- Infraorder: Araneomorphae
- Family: Corinnidae
- Genus: Procopius
- Species: P. aeneolus

Binomial name
- Procopius aeneolus Simon, 1903

Species of spider

Procopius aeneolus is a species of spider in the family Corinnidae, found in Equatorial Guinea.
