= Psellocoptus =

Scientific classification
- Kingdom: Animalia
- Phylum: Arthropoda
- Subphylum: Chelicerata
- Class: Arachnida
- Order: Araneae
- Infraorder: Araneomorphae
- Family: Corinnidae
- Genus: Psellocoptus; Simon, 1896

Type species
- P. flavostriatus Simon, 1896

Species
- P. buchlii Reiskind, 1971 – Venezuela; P. flavostriatus Simon, 1896 – Venezuela; P. prodontus Reiskind, 1971 – Venezuela

Genus of spiders

Psellocoptus is a genus of South American running spiders first described by Eugène Simon in 1896. When Eugène Simon discovered the first species (P. flavostriatus), he described it as a "beautiful and large species from the forests of Venezuela which [is] found running rapidly on the trunks of trees". The species name flavostriatus means "striped yellow". P. buchlii is named after the late Harro Buchli, and the species name prodontus is from the Greek meaning "tooth in front".

Two other species were found in 1971, and are very similar to the first, though the genus as a whole is quite distinct from any other in general form and characteristics. It probably became isolated from the more widespread genera Myrmecium and Castianeira. While the similar genera Myrmecium and Sphecotypus also have an indented carapace, Psellocoptus has a rounded anterior end and a relatively unsegmented red-brown, shiny, slightly granulated carapace.

== Species ==
As of April 2019 it contains only three species, all found in Venezuela.

- P. buchlii Reiskind, 1971 – Venezuela
- P. flavostriatus Simon, 1896 – Venezuela
- P. prodontus Reiskind, 1971 – Venezuela
