= Bunyoronius =

Scientific classification
- Kingdom: Animalia
- Phylum: Arthropoda
- Subphylum: Chelicerata
- Class: Arachnida
- Order: Araneae
- Infraorder: Araneomorphae
- Family: Corinnidae
- Genus: Bunyoronius; Bonaldo, Ramírez & Haddad, 2022
- Species: B. femoralis

Binomial name
- Bunyoronius femoralis Bonaldo, Ramírez & Haddad, 2022

Species of spider

Bunyoronius is a monotypic genus of spiders in the family Corinnidae containing the single species, Bunyoronius femoralis.

== Distribution ==
Bunyoronius femoralis has been recorded from the Central African Republic, Uganda, and Rwanda.

== Etymology ==
The genus name is "a contraction of the words Bunyoro and [related genus] Carteronius, honoring the Bunyoro people, a pre-colonial Kingdom on the territory of modern Uganda, including the Budongo Forest, type locality of the type species."

The specific name highlights the large male palpal apical retrolateral femoral apophysis.
