= Sphecotypus taprobanicus =

Scientific classification
- Kingdom: Animalia
- Phylum: Arthropoda
- Subphylum: Chelicerata
- Class: Arachnida
- Order: Araneae
- Infraorder: Araneomorphae
- Family: Corinnidae
- Genus: Sphecotypus
- Species: S. taprobanicus

Binomial name
- Sphecotypus taprobanicus Simon, 1897

Species of spider

Sphecotypus taprobanicus, is a species of spider of the genus Sphecotypus. It is endemic to Sri Lanka.
