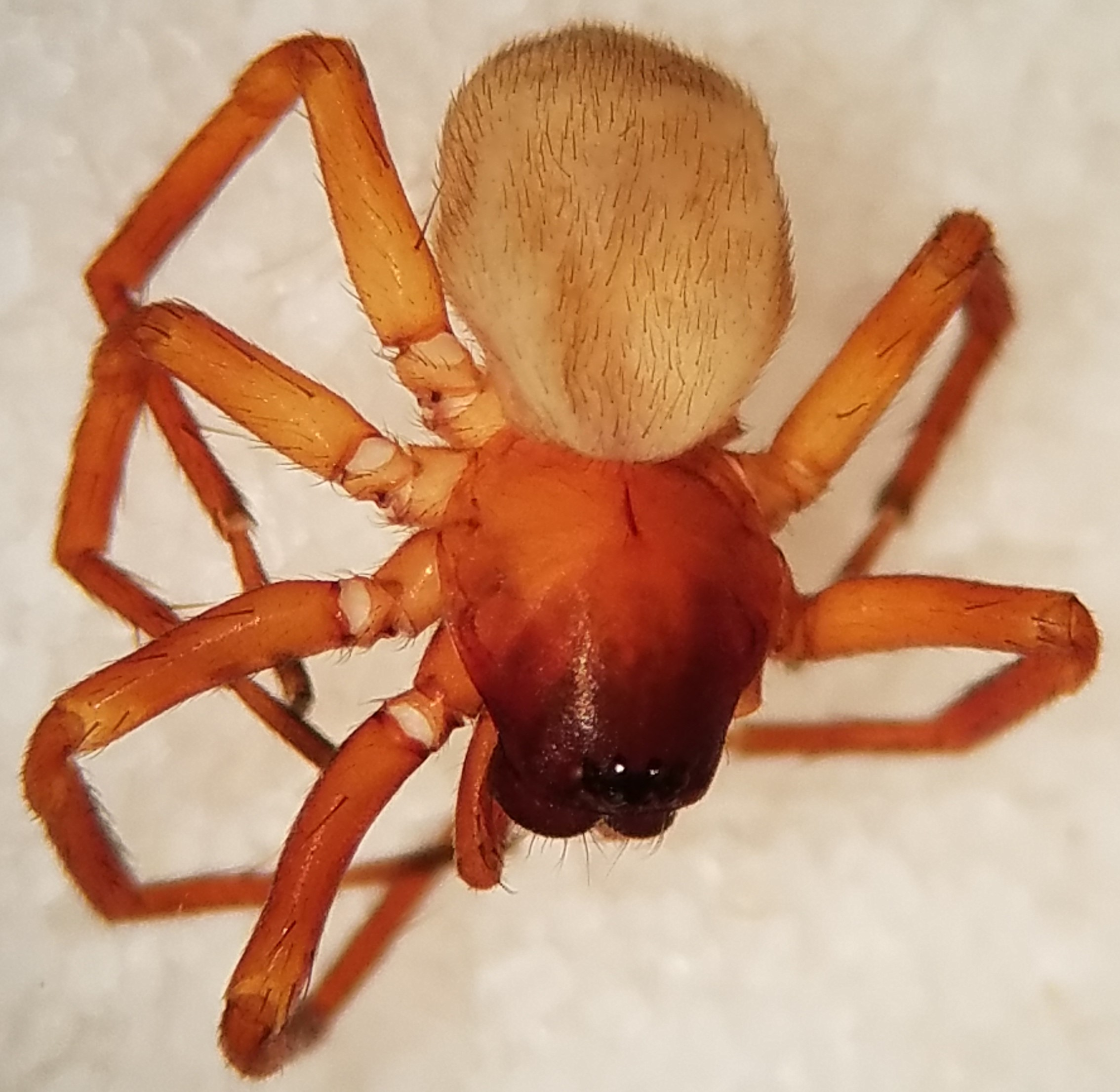

Scientific classification
- Kingdom: Animalia
- Phylum: Arthropoda
- Subphylum: Chelicerata
- Class: Arachnida
- Order: Araneae
- Infraorder: Araneomorphae
- Family: Corinnidae
- Genus: Septentrinna
- Species: S. bicalcarata

Binomial name
- Septentrinna bicalcarata (Simon, 1896)

= Septentrinna bicalcarata =

Species of spider

Septentrinna bicalcarata is a species of true spider in the family Corinnidae. It is found in North America.

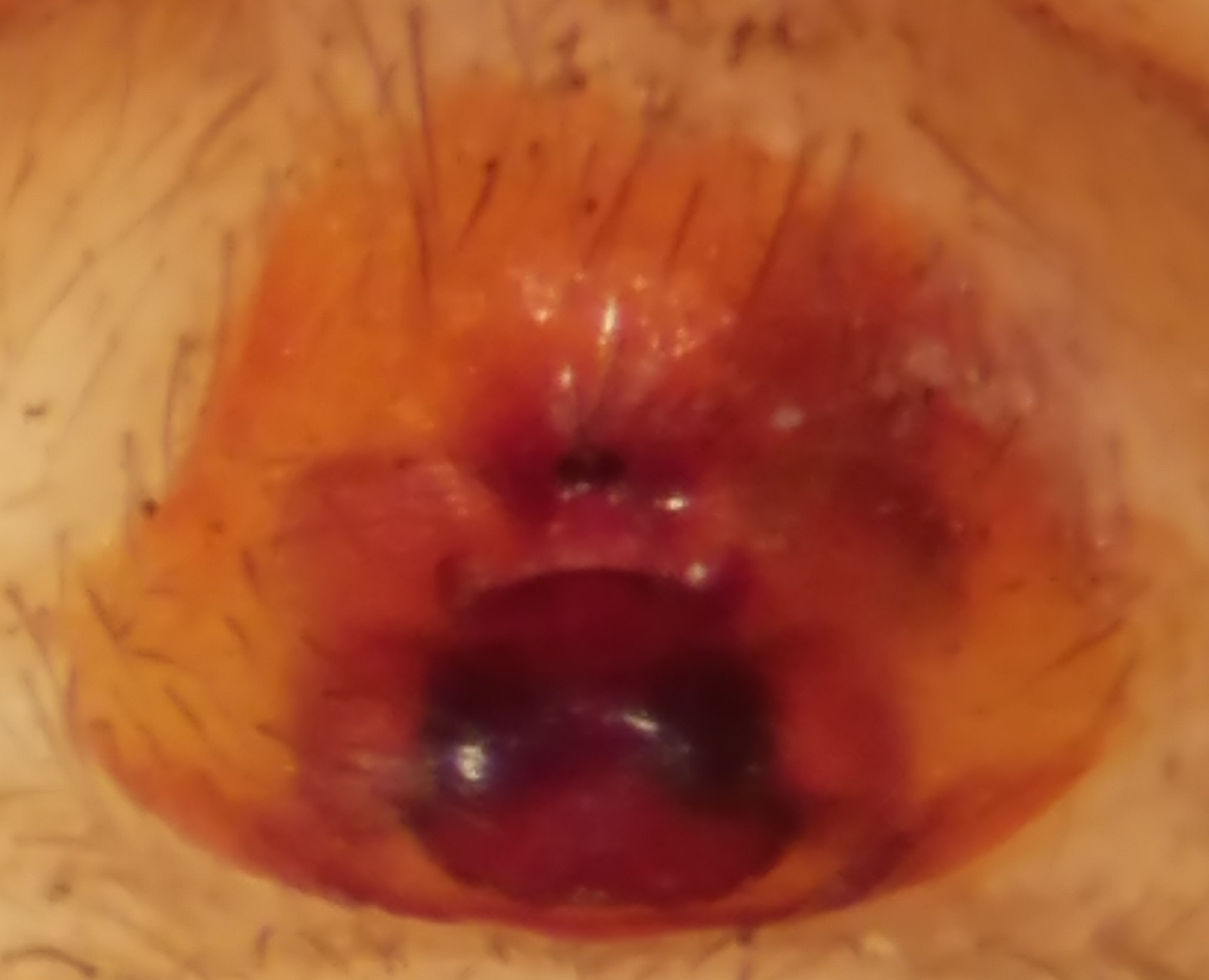
Epigynum ventral view
