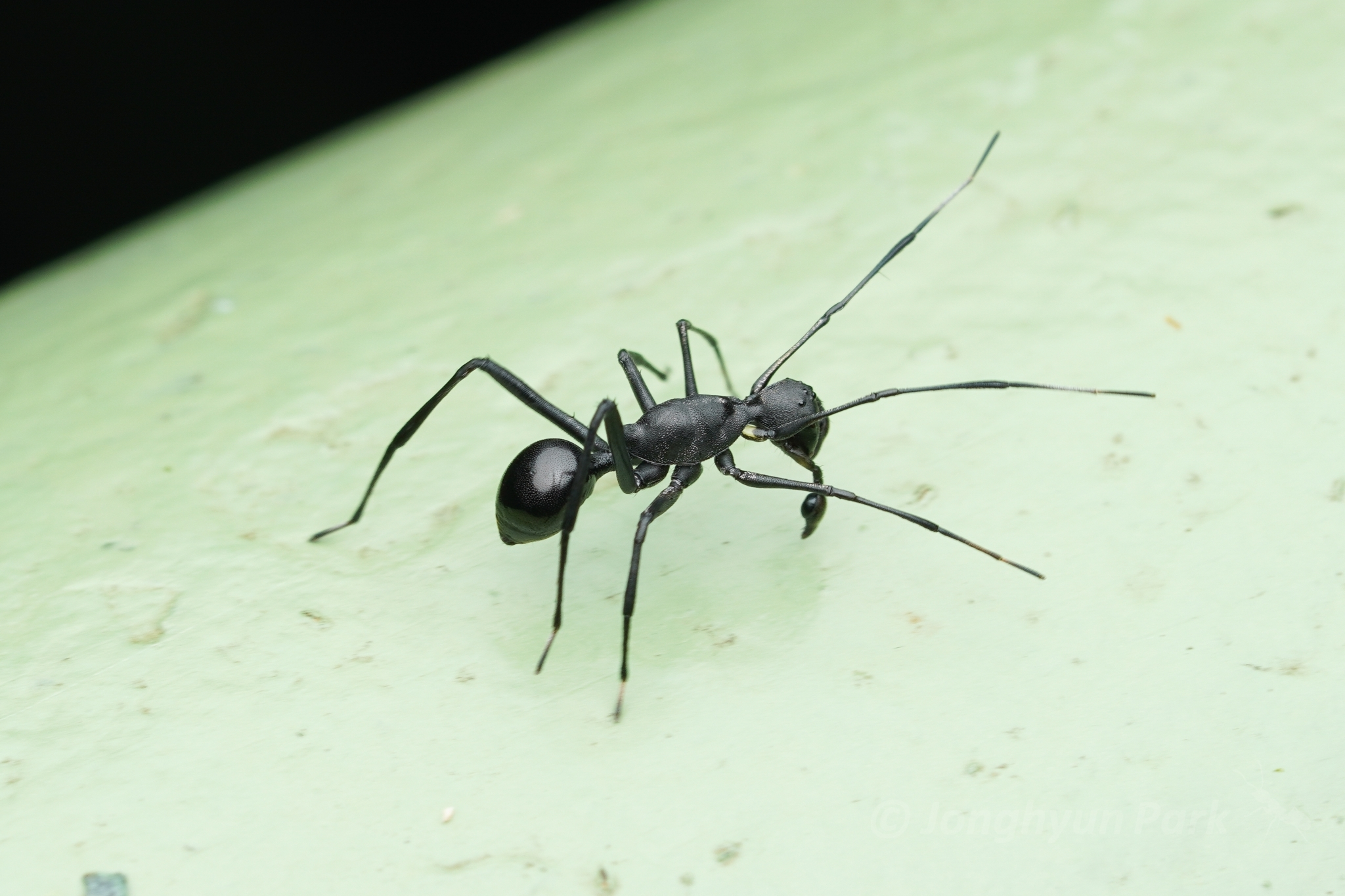
- P. borneensis
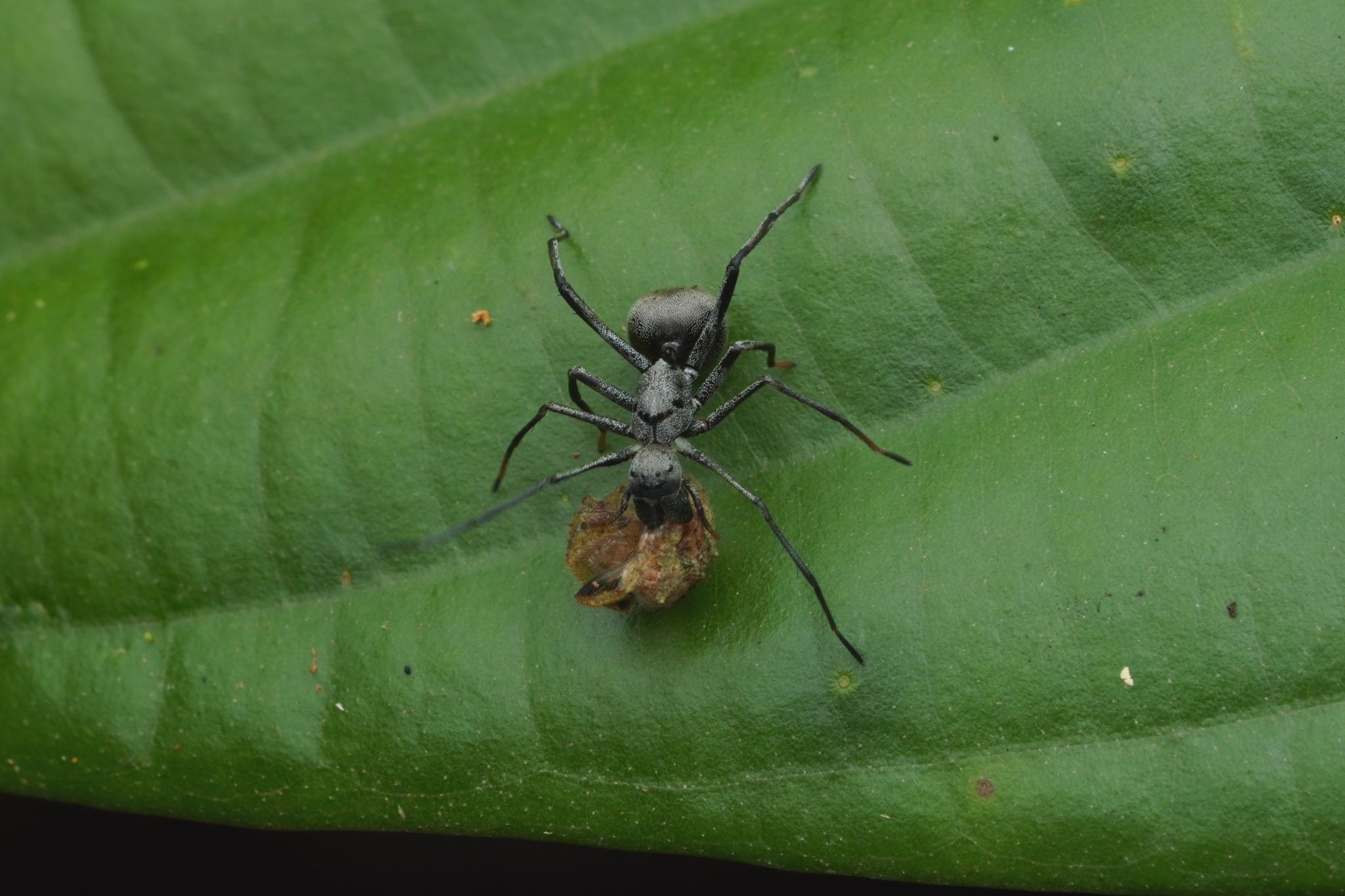
- P. borneensis

Scientific classification
- Kingdom: Animalia
- Phylum: Arthropoda
- Subphylum: Chelicerata
- Class: Arachnida
- Order: Araneae
- Infraorder: Araneomorphae
- Family: Corinnidae
- Genus: Peng; Lu & Li, 2023

Type species
- Myrmecisca birmanica Thorell, 1897

Species
- 3, see text

= Peng (spider) =

Genus of spiders

Peng is a genus of ant-mimicking spiders in the family Corinnidae.

== Distribution ==
Peng occurs in South and Southeast Asia, with species recorded from Sri Lanka, Myanmar, the Yunnan province of China, and Malaysia (Borneo).

== Etymology ==
The gender is named after Chinese arachnologist Xianjin Peng (born 1963).

== Taxonomy ==
Its three species were formerly members of the related genus Sphecotypus.

== Species ==
As of October 2025, this genus includes three species:

- Peng birmanicus (Thorell, 1897) – Myanmar, China (type species)
- Peng borneensis (Yamasaki, 2017) – Malaysia (Borneo)
- Peng taprobanicus (Simon, 1897) – Sri Lanka
