= Paradiestus =

Scientific classification
- Domain: Eukaryota
- Kingdom: Animalia
- Phylum: Arthropoda
- Subphylum: Chelicerata
- Class: Arachnida
- Order: Araneae
- Infraorder: Araneomorphae
- Family: Corinnidae
- Genus: Paradiestus; Mello-Leitão, 1915

Type species
- P. aurantiacus Mello-Leitão, 1915

Species
- 5, see text

Genus of spiders

Paradiestus is a genus of South American corinnid sac spiders first described by Cândido Firmino de Mello-Leitão in 1915. It was considered a synonym of Corinna from 1925 to 2000.

== Species ==
As of April 2019 it contains five species, all found in Brazil:

- Paradiestus aurantiacus Mello-Leitão, 1915 (type) – Brazil
- Paradiestus egregius (Simon, 1896) – Brazil
- Paradiestus giganteus (Karsch, 1880) – Brazil
- Paradiestus penicillatus (Mello-Leitão, 1939) – Brazil
- Paradiestus vitiosus (Keyserling, 1891) – Brazil
