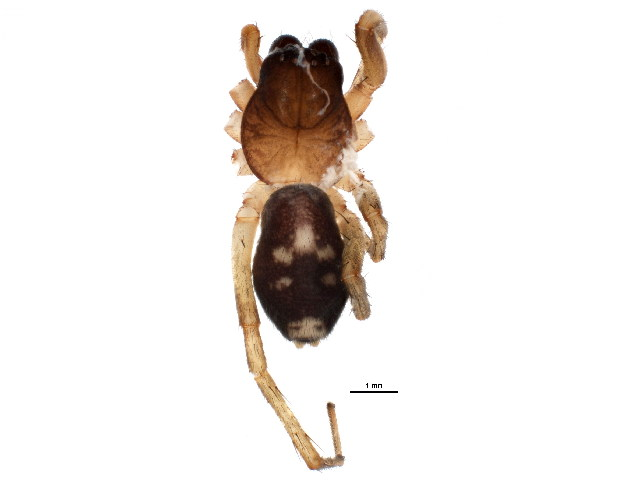
- F. gracilis, adult female

Scientific classification
- Domain: Eukaryota
- Kingdom: Animalia
- Phylum: Arthropoda
- Subphylum: Chelicerata
- Class: Arachnida
- Order: Araneae
- Infraorder: Araneomorphae
- Family: Corinnidae
- Genus: Falconina
- Species: F. gracilis

Binomial name
- Falconina gracilis (Keyserling, 1891)

= Falconina gracilis =

Species of spider

Falconina gracilis is a species of true spider in the family Corinnidae. It is found in Brazil, Paraguay, and Argentina, and has been introduced into the United States.
