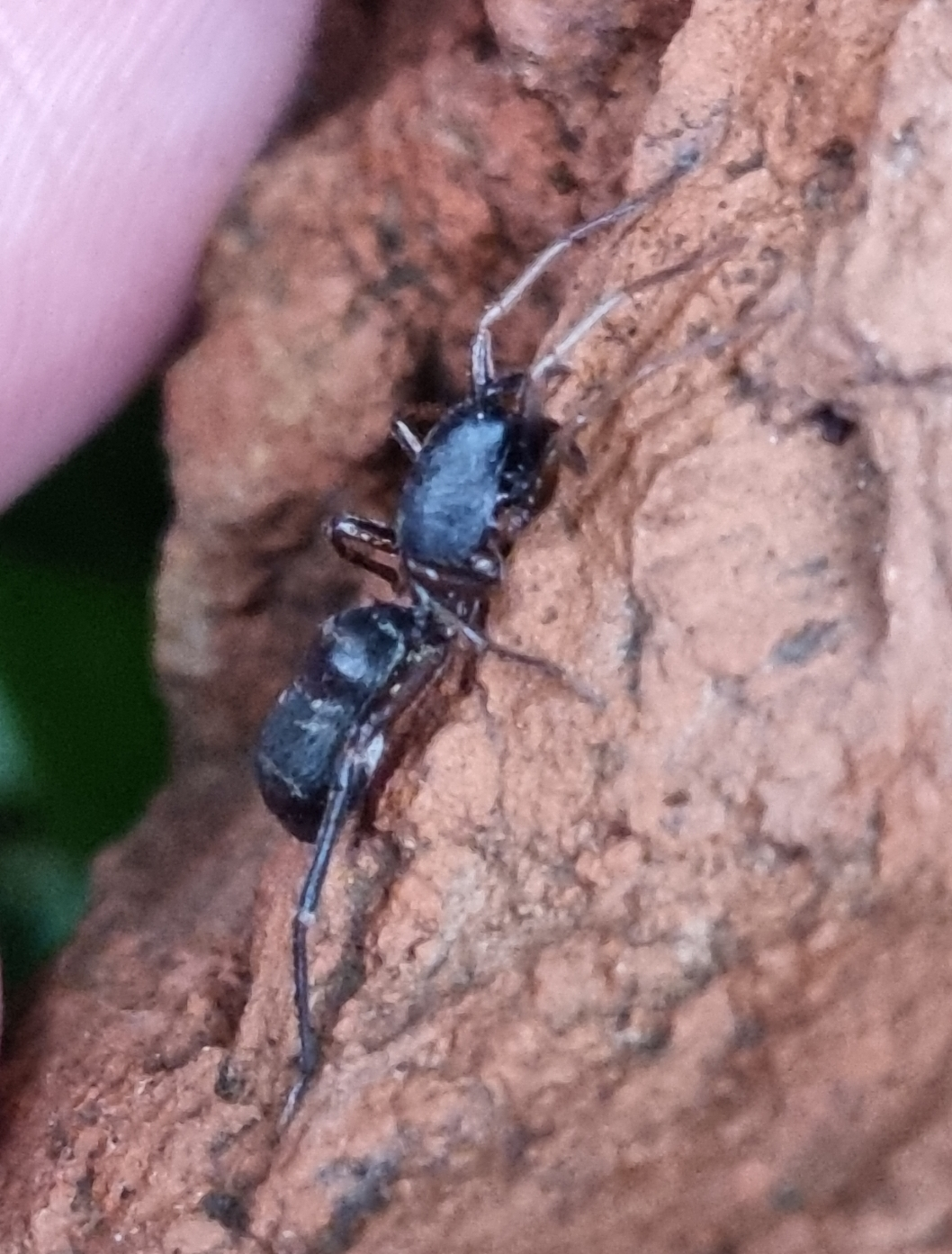
- Grismadox sp. from Argentina
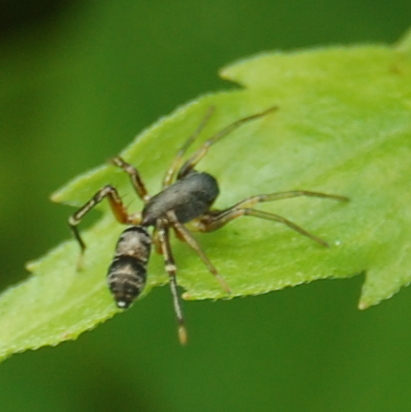
- Grismadox sp. from Brazil

Scientific classification
- Kingdom: Animalia
- Phylum: Arthropoda
- Subphylum: Chelicerata
- Class: Arachnida
- Order: Araneae
- Infraorder: Araneomorphae
- Family: Corinnidae
- Genus: Grismadox; Pett, Rubio & Perger, 2022

Type species
- G. karugua Pett, Rubio & Perger, 2022

Species
- 10, see text

= Grismadox =

Genus of spiders

Grismadox is a genus of spiders in the family Corinnidae.

== Distribution ==
Grismadox species are mostly found in Brazil and Bolivia, with some reaching into Paraguay.

== Species ==
As of October 2025, this genus includes ten species:

- Grismadox annatar Silva-Junior, Pett & Bonaldo, 2025 – Brazil
- Grismadox armatus (Mello-Leitão, 1922) – Brazil
- Grismadox baueri Pett, Rubio & Perger, 2022 – Bolivia
- Grismadox elsneri Perger, Rubio & Pett, 2022 – Brazil, Bolivia
- Grismadox karugua Pett, Rubio & Perger, 2022 – Brazil, Paraguay (type species)
- Grismadox mazaxoides (Perger & Dupérré, 2021) – Brazil, Bolivia, Paraguay
- Grismadox mboitui (Pett, 2021) – Brazil, Paraguay
- Grismadox monai (Pett, 2023) – Peru, Brazil, Bolivia, Paraguay
- Grismadox nazgul Silva-Junior, Pett & Bonaldo, 2025 – Brazil
- Grismadox rubioi (Pett & Perger, 2021) – Bolivia
