= Spinirta =

Scientific classification
- Kingdom: Animalia
- Phylum: Arthropoda
- Subphylum: Chelicerata
- Class: Arachnida
- Order: Araneae
- Infraorder: Araneomorphae
- Family: Corinnidae
- Genus: Spinirta; Jin & Zhang, 2020

Type species
- S. jinyunshanensis Jin & Zhang, 2020

Species
- 10, see text

Genus of spiders

Spinirta is a genus of east Asian corinnid sac spiders. It was first described by C. Jin and F. Zhang in 2020, and it has only been found in China.

== Species ==
As of November 2021 it contains ten species:

- S. aurita Jin & Zhang, 2020 – China
- S. aviforma Jin & Zhang, 2020 – China
- S. forcipata Jin & Zhang, 2020 – China
- S. jinyunshanensis Jin & Zhang, 2020 – China
- S. leigongshanensis Jin & Zhang, 2020 – China
- S. qiaoliaoensis (Lu & Chen, 2019) – China
- S. qizimeiensis Jin & Zhang, 2020 – China
- S. quadrata Jin & Zhang, 2020 – China
- S. rugosa Jin & Zhang, 2020 – China
- S. sparsula Jin & Zhang, 2020 – China

== See also ==
- Allomedmassa
