= Simonestus =

Scientific classification
- Kingdom: Animalia
- Phylum: Arthropoda
- Subphylum: Chelicerata
- Class: Arachnida
- Order: Araneae
- Infraorder: Araneomorphae
- Family: Corinnidae
- Genus: Simonestus; Bonaldo, 2000

Type species
- S. validus (Simon, 1898)

Species
- 6, see text

Genus of spiders

Simonestus is a genus of corinnid sac spiders first described by A. B. Bonaldo in 2000.

== Species ==
As of April 2019 it contains six species in the Americas:

- Simonestus occidentalis (Schenkel, 1953) – Venezuela
- Simonestus pseudobulbulus (Caporiacco, 1938) – Guatemala
- Simonestus robustus (Chickering, 1937) – Panama
- Simonestus semiluna (F. O. Pickard-Cambridge, 1899) – Mexico, Guatemala
- Simonestus separatus (Schmidt, 1971) – Guatemala to Peru
- Simonestus validus (Simon, 1898) (type) – Venezuela
