= Attacobius =

Scientific classification
- Domain: Eukaryota
- Kingdom: Animalia
- Phylum: Arthropoda
- Subphylum: Chelicerata
- Class: Arachnida
- Order: Araneae
- Infraorder: Araneomorphae
- Family: Corinnidae
- Genus: Attacobius; Mello-Leitão, 1925

Type species
- A. luederwaldti (Mello-Leitão, 1923)

Species
- 16, see text

Synonyms
- Achalaicola Mello-Leitão, 1943; Morenilia Mello-Leitão, 1942; Myrmeques Roewer, 1935

Genus of spiders

Attacobius is a genus of South American corinnid sac spiders first described by Cândido Firmino de Mello-Leitão in 1925.

== Species ==
As of April 2019 it contains sixteen species, one from Argentina and the rest from Brazil:

- Attacobius attarum (Roewer, 1935) – Brazil
- Attacobius blakei Bonaldo & Brescovit, 2005 – Brazil
- Attacobius carimbo Pereira-Filho, Saturnino & Bonaldo, 2018 – Brazil
- Attacobius carranca Bonaldo & Brescovit, 2005 – Brazil
- Attacobius demiguise Pereira-Filho, Saturnino & Bonaldo, 2018 – Brazil
- Attacobius kitae Bonaldo & Brescovit, 2005 – Brazil
- Attacobius lamellatus Bonaldo & Brescovit, 2005 – Brazil
- Attacobius lauricae Pereira-Filho, Saturnino & Bonaldo, 2018 – Brazil
- Attacobius lavape Bonaldo, Pesquero & Brescovit, 2018 – Brazil
- Attacobius luederwaldti (Mello-Leitão, 1923) (type) – Brazil
- Attacobius nigripes (Mello-Leitão, 1942) – Argentina
- Attacobius thalitae Pereira-Filho, Saturnino & Bonaldo, 2018 – Brazil
- Attacobius tremembe Pereira-Filho, Saturnino & Bonaldo, 2018 – Brazil
- Attacobius tucurui Bonaldo & Brescovit, 2005 – Brazil
- Attacobius uiriri Bonaldo & Brescovit, 2005 – Brazil
- Attacobius verhaaghi Bonaldo & Brescovit, 1998 – Brazil
