= Crinopseudoa =

Scientific classification
- Kingdom: Animalia
- Phylum: Arthropoda
- Subphylum: Chelicerata
- Class: Arachnida
- Order: Araneae
- Infraorder: Araneomorphae
- Family: Corinnidae
- Genus: Crinopseudoa; Jocqué & Bosselaers, 2011

Type species
- C. bong Jocqué & Bosselaers, 2011

Species
- 11, see text

Genus of spiders

Crinopseudoa is a genus of West African corinnid sac spiders first described by Rudy Jocqué & J. Bosselaers in 2011.

== Species ==
As of April 2019 it contains eleven species from Guinea and Liberia:

- Crinopseudoa billeni Jocqué & Bosselaers, 2011 – Guinea
- Crinopseudoa bong Jocqué & Bosselaers, 2011 (type) – Liberia
- Crinopseudoa bongella Jocqué & Bosselaers, 2011 – Liberia
- Crinopseudoa caligula Jocqué & Bosselaers, 2011 – Liberia
- Crinopseudoa catharinae Jocqué & Bosselaers, 2011 – Guinea, Liberia
- Crinopseudoa ephialtes Jocqué & Bosselaers, 2011 – Guinea
- Crinopseudoa flomoi Jocqué & Bosselaers, 2011 – Liberia
- Crinopseudoa leiothorax Jocqué & Bosselaers, 2011 – Guinea
- Crinopseudoa otus Jocqué & Bosselaers, 2011 – Guinea
- Crinopseudoa paucigranulata Jocqué & Bosselaers, 2011 – Guinea
- Crinopseudoa titan Jocqué & Bosselaers, 2011 – Guinea
