= Donuea =

Scientific classification
- Kingdom: Animalia
- Phylum: Arthropoda
- Subphylum: Chelicerata
- Class: Arachnida
- Order: Araneae
- Infraorder: Araneomorphae
- Family: Corinnidae
- Genus: Donuea; Strand, 1932

Species
- 5, see text

Synonyms
- Donuca Simon, 1903

Genus of spiders

Donuea is a genus of African corinnid sac spiders first described by Embrik Strand in 1932.

== Species ==
As of November 2022 it contains five species:

- Donuea argenticoma (Keyserling, 1877) – Madagascar
- Donuea collustrata Bosselaers & Dierick, 2010 – Madagascar
- Donuea decorsei (Simon, 1903) (type) – Madagascar
- Donuea fusca (Simon, 1896) – Mauritius
- Donuea vittigera (Simon, 1896) – Madagascar
