= Methesis =

Scientific classification
- Kingdom: Animalia
- Phylum: Arthropoda
- Subphylum: Chelicerata
- Class: Arachnida
- Order: Araneae
- Infraorder: Araneomorphae
- Family: Corinnidae
- Genus: Methesis; Simon, 1896

Type species
- M. semirufa Simon, 1896

Species
- M. brevitarsa Caporiacco, 1954 – French Guiana; M. semirufa Simon, 1896 – Colombia, Brazil, Peru, Bolivia

Genus of spiders

Methesis is a genus of South American corinnid sac spiders first described by Eugène Simon in 1896. Originally placed with the ground spiders, it was moved to Corinnidae in 1969. As of April 2019 it contains only two species.
