= Olbus =

Scientific classification
- Kingdom: Animalia
- Phylum: Arthropoda
- Subphylum: Chelicerata
- Class: Arachnida
- Order: Araneae
- Infraorder: Araneomorphae
- Family: Corinnidae
- Genus: Olbus; Simon, 1880

Type species
- O. sparassoides (Nicolet, 1849)

Species
- 5, see text

Genus of spiders

Olbus is a genus of South American corinnid sac spiders first described by Eugène Simon in 1880 as a huntsman spider. It was moved to the sac spider family in 1988, then to the Corinnidae in 2001.

== Species ==
As of April 2019 it contains five species, all found in Chile:

- Olbus eryngiophilus Ramírez, Lopardo & Bonaldo, 2001 – Chile
- Olbus jaguar Ramírez, Lopardo & Bonaldo, 2001 – Chile
- Olbus krypto Ramírez, Lopardo & Bonaldo, 2001 – Chile
- Olbus nahuelbuta Ramírez, Lopardo & Bonaldo, 2001 – Chile
- Olbus sparassoides (Nicolet, 1849) (type) – Chile
