= Erendira (spider) =

Scientific classification
- Kingdom: Animalia
- Phylum: Arthropoda
- Subphylum: Chelicerata
- Class: Arachnida
- Order: Araneae
- Infraorder: Araneomorphae
- Family: Corinnidae
- Genus: Erendira; Bonaldo, 2000

Type species
- E. pallidoguttata (Simon, 1898)

Species
- 5, see text

Genus of spiders

Erendira is a genus of corinnid sac spiders first described by A. B. Bonaldo in 2000.

== Species ==
As of April 2019 it contains five species:

- Erendira atrox (Caporiacco, 1955) — Venezuela
- Erendira luteomaculata (Petrunkevitch, 1925) — Panama
- Erendira pallidoguttata (Simon, 1898) — Puerto Rico, Lesser Antilles
- Erendira pictithorax (Caporiacco, 1955) — Venezuela
- Erendira subsignata (Simon, 1898) — St. Vincent
