= Ozcopa =

Scientific classification
- Domain: Eukaryota
- Kingdom: Animalia
- Phylum: Arthropoda
- Subphylum: Chelicerata
- Class: Arachnida
- Order: Araneae
- Infraorder: Araneomorphae
- Family: Corinnidae
- Genus: Ozcopa; Raven

Type species
- Ozcopa colloffi

Species
- 6, see text

Genus of spiders

Ozcopa is a genus of spiders in the family Corinnidae. It was first described in 2015 by Raven. As of 2017, it contains 6 species, all from Queensland.

== Species ==
Ozcopa comprises the following species:

- Ozcopa chiunei Raven, 2015
- Ozcopa colloffi Raven, 2015
- Ozcopa margotandersenae Raven, 2015
- Ozcopa mcdonaldi Raven, 2015
- Ozcopa monteithi Raven, 2015
- Ozcopa zborowskii Raven, 2015
