= Kolora =

Scientific classification
- Domain: Eukaryota
- Kingdom: Animalia
- Phylum: Arthropoda
- Subphylum: Chelicerata
- Class: Arachnida
- Order: Araneae
- Infraorder: Araneomorphae
- Family: Corinnidae
- Genus: Kolora; Raven

Species
- Kolora cooloola Raven, 2015; Kolora cushingae Raven, 2015; Kolora lynneae Raven, 2015; Kolora suaverubens (Simon, 1896)

Genus of spiders

Kolora is a genus of spiders in the family Corinnidae. It was first described in 2015 by Raven. As of 2016 it contains 4 species, all found in Queensland.
