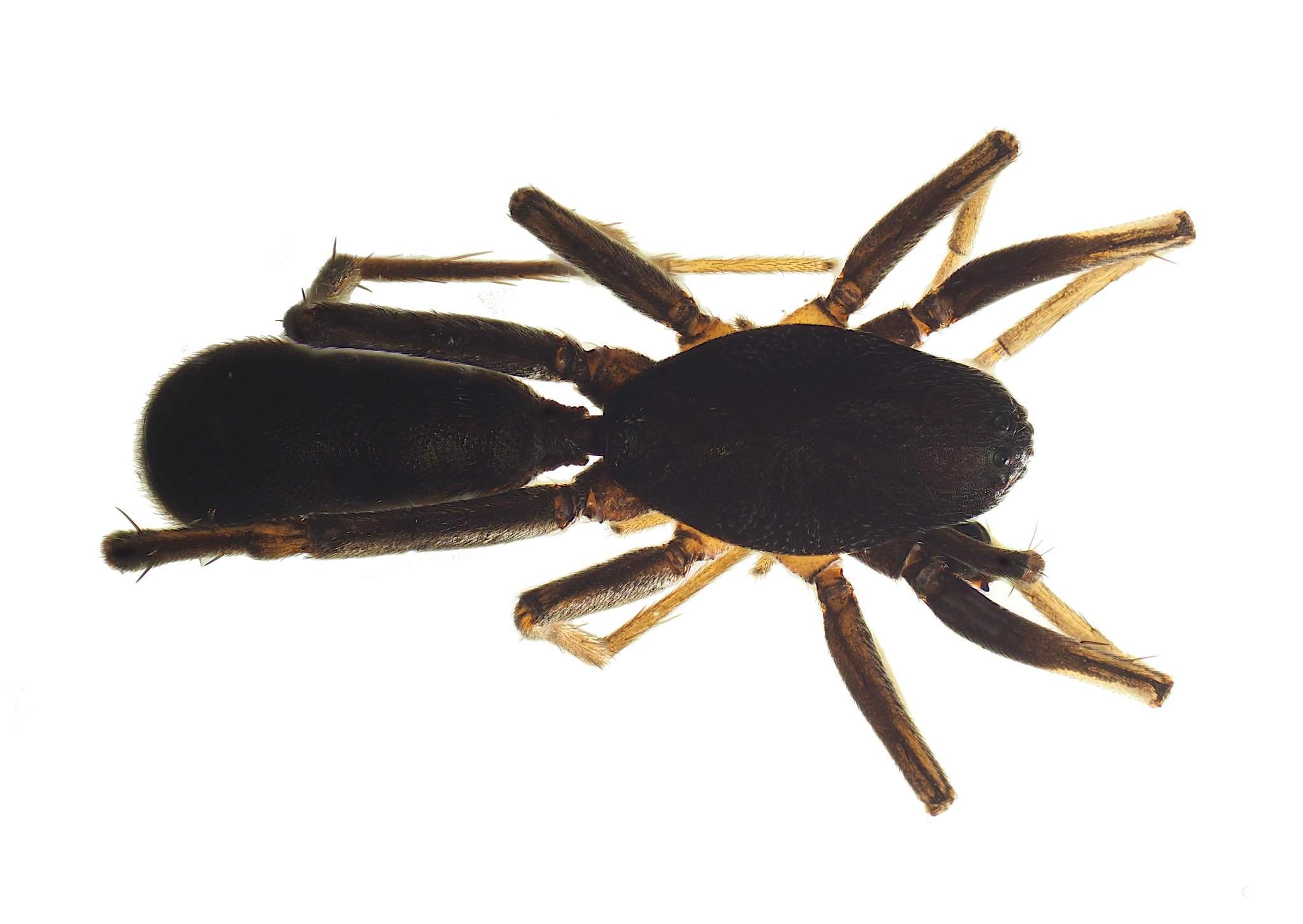
- Poecilipta kgari

Scientific classification
- Kingdom: Animalia
- Phylum: Arthropoda
- Subphylum: Chelicerata
- Class: Arachnida
- Order: Araneae
- Infraorder: Araneomorphae
- Family: Corinnidae
- Genus: Poecilipta; Simon, 1897

Type species
- P. janthina Simon, 1896

Species
- 27, see text

= Poecilipta =

Genus of spiders

Poecilipta is a genus of South Pacific corinnid sac spiders first described by Eugène Simon in 1897.

== Species ==
As of April 2019 it contains twenty-seven species in Australia, and one on New Caledonia:

- Poecilipta carnarvon Raven, 2015 – Australia (Western Australia)
- Poecilipta contorqua Raven, 2015 – Australia (New South Wales)
- Poecilipta davidi Raven, 2015 – Australia (South Australia)
- Poecilipta elvis Raven, 2015 – Australia (Western Australia)
- Poecilipta formiciforme (Rainbow, 1904) – Australia (New South Wales)
- Poecilipta gloverae Raven, 2015 – Australia (Queensland)
- Poecilipta harveyi Raven, 2015 – Australia (Western Australia)
- Poecilipta janthina Simon, 1896 (type) – Australia (Queensland)
- Poecilipta jilbadji Raven, 2015 – Australia (Western Australia)
- Poecilipta kgari Raven, 2015 – Australia (Queensland)
- Poecilipta kohouti Raven, 2015 – Australia (Northern Territory, South Australia, Queensland, New South Wales)
- Poecilipta lugubris Raven, 2015 – Australia (New South Wales, Australian Capital Territory)
- Poecilipta mandjelia Raven, 2015 – New Caledonia
- Poecilipta marengo Raven, 2015 – Australia (New South Wales)
- Poecilipta metallica Raven, 2015 – Australia (Queensland)
- Poecilipta micaelae Raven, 2015 – Australia (New South Wales)
- Poecilipta qunats Raven, 2015 – Australia (Queensland)
- Poecilipta rawlinsonae Raven, 2015 – Australia (Western Australia)
- Poecilipta ruthae Santana & Raven, 2015 – Australia (Queensland)
- Poecilipta samueli Raven, 2015 – Australia (Queensland)
- Poecilipta smaragdinea (Simon, 1909) – Australia (Western Australia)
- Poecilipta tinda Raven, 2015 – Australia (South Australia)
- Poecilipta venusta Rainbow, 1904 – Australia (Queensland to Victoria, South Australia)
- Poecilipta waldockae Raven, 2015 – Australia (Western Australia)
- Poecilipta wallacei Raven, 2015 – Australia (Western Australia to Queensland)
- Poecilipta yambuna Raven, 2015 – Australia (Victoria)
- Poecilipta zbigniewi Raven, 2015 – Australia (Tasmania)
