= Leichhardteus =

Scientific classification
- Domain: Eukaryota
- Kingdom: Animalia
- Phylum: Arthropoda
- Subphylum: Chelicerata
- Class: Arachnida
- Order: Araneae
- Infraorder: Araneomorphae
- Family: Corinnidae
- Genus: Leichhardteus; Raven & Baehr, 2013

Type species
- L. conopalpis Baehr & Raven, 2013

Species
- 11, see text

Genus of spiders

Leichhardteus is a genus of Australian corinnid sac spiders first described by B. C. Baehr & Robert Raven in 2013.

== Species ==
As of April 2019 it contains eleven species:

- Leichhardteus albofasciatus Baehr & Raven, 2013 – Australia (Queensland, New South Wales)
- Leichhardteus badius Baehr & Raven, 2013 – Australia (Queensland)
- Leichhardteus bimaculatus Baehr & Raven, 2013 – Australia (Queensland)
- Leichhardteus conopalpis Baehr & Raven, 2013 (type) – Eastern Australia
- Leichhardteus evschlingeri Raven, 2015 – Australia (Western Australia)
- Leichhardteus garretti Baehr & Raven, 2013 – Australia (Queensland)
- Leichhardteus kroombit Baehr & Raven, 2013 – Australia (Queensland, New South Wales)
- Leichhardteus reinhardi Baehr & Raven, 2013 – Australia (Queensland)
- Leichhardteus strzelecki Raven, 2015 – Australia (Victoria)
- Leichhardteus terriirwinae Baehr & Raven, 2013 – Australia (Queensland)
- Leichhardteus yagan Raven, 2015 – Australia (Western Australia)
