= Septentrinna =

Scientific classification
- Kingdom: Animalia
- Phylum: Arthropoda
- Subphylum: Chelicerata
- Class: Arachnida
- Order: Araneae
- Infraorder: Araneomorphae
- Family: Corinnidae
- Genus: Septentrinna; Bonaldo, 2000

Type species
- S. bicalcarata (Simon, 1896)

Species
- 6, see text

Genus of spiders

Septentrinna is a genus of corinnid sac spiders first described by A. B. Bonaldo in 2000.

== Species ==
As of April 2019 it contains six species:

- Septentrinna bicalcarata (Simon, 1896) (type) – USA, Mexico
- Septentrinna paradoxa (F. O. Pickard-Cambridge, 1899) – Guatemala
- Septentrinna potosi Bonaldo, 2000 – Mexico
- Septentrinna retusa (F. O. Pickard-Cambridge, 1899) – Guatemala
- Septentrinna steckleri (Gertsch, 1936) – USA, Mexico
- Septentrinna yucatan Bonaldo, 2000 – Mexico
