= Pseudocorinna =

Scientific classification
- Kingdom: Animalia
- Phylum: Arthropoda
- Subphylum: Chelicerata
- Class: Arachnida
- Order: Araneae
- Infraorder: Araneomorphae
- Family: Corinnidae
- Genus: Pseudocorinna; Simon, 1910

Type species
- P. rutila Simon, 1910

Species
- 29, see text

Genus of spiders

Pseudocorinna is a genus of African corinnid sac spiders first described by Eugène Simon in 1910.

== Species ==
As of April 2019 it contains twenty-nine species:

- Pseudocorinna alligator Jocqué & Bosselaers, 2011 – Guinea, Liberia, Ivory Coast
- Pseudocorinna amicorum Jocqué & Bosselaers, 2011 – Cameroon
- Pseudocorinna amphibia Jocqué & Bosselaers, 2011 – Ivory Coast
- Pseudocorinna banco Jocqué & Bosselaers, 2011 – Guinea, Ivory Coast
- Pseudocorinna bilobata Jocqué & Bosselaers, 2011 – Togo
- Pseudocorinna brianeno Jocqué & Bosselaers, 2011 – Guinea, Liberia, Ivory Coast
- Pseudocorinna celisi Jocqué & Bosselaers, 2011 – Congo
- Pseudocorinna christae Jocqué & Bosselaers, 2011 – Ivory Coast
- Pseudocorinna cymarum Jocqué & Bosselaers, 2011 – Ghana
- Pseudocorinna doutreleponti Jocqué & Bosselaers, 2011 – Cameroon
- Pseudocorinna eruca Jocqué & Bosselaers, 2011 – Congo
- Pseudocorinna evertsi Jocqué & Bosselaers, 2011 – Ivory Coast
- Pseudocorinna febe Jocqué & Bosselaers, 2011 – Cameroon
- Pseudocorinna felix Jocqué & Bosselaers, 2011 – Ivory Coast
- Pseudocorinna gevaertsi Jocqué & Bosselaers, 2011 – Congo
- Pseudocorinna incisa Jocqué & Bosselaers, 2011 – Gabon
- Pseudocorinna juakalyi Jocqué & Bosselaers, 2011 – Congo
- Pseudocorinna lanius Jocqué & Bosselaers, 2011 – Liberia, Ivory Coast
- Pseudocorinna lobelia Jocqué & Bosselaers, 2011 – Congo
- Pseudocorinna natalis Jocqué & Bosselaers, 2011 – Congo
- Pseudocorinna naufraga Jocqué & Bosselaers, 2011 – Congo
- Pseudocorinna okupe Jocqué & Bosselaers, 2011 – Cameroon
- Pseudocorinna orientalis Jocqué & Bosselaers, 2011 – Congo
- Pseudocorinna perplexa Jocqué & Bosselaers, 2011 – Nigeria
- Pseudocorinna personata Jocqué & Bosselaers, 2011 – Cameroon
- Pseudocorinna rutila Simon, 1910 (type) – Guinea-Bissau
- Pseudocorinna septemaculeata Simon, 1910 – Cameroon, Equatorial Guinea (Bioko)
- Pseudocorinna ubicki Jocqué & Bosselaers, 2011 – Equatorial Guinea (Bioko)
- Pseudocorinna victoria Jocqué & Bosselaers, 2011 – Cameroon
