= Stethorrhagus =

Scientific classification
- Kingdom: Animalia
- Phylum: Arthropoda
- Subphylum: Chelicerata
- Class: Arachnida
- Order: Araneae
- Infraorder: Araneomorphae
- Family: Corinnidae
- Genus: Stethorrhagus; Simon, 1896

Type species
- S. limbatus Simon, 1896

Species
- 15, see text

Genus of spiders

Stethorrhagus is a genus of South American corinnid sac spiders first described by Eugène Simon in 1896.

== Species ==
As of April 2019 it contains fifteen species:

- Stethorrhagus archangelus Bonaldo & Brescovit, 1994 – Brazil
- Stethorrhagus chalybeius (L. Koch, 1866) – Colombia
- Stethorrhagus duidae Gertsch, 1942 – Venezuela
- Stethorrhagus hyula Bonaldo & Brescovit, 1994 – Colombia
- Stethorrhagus latoma Bonaldo & Brescovit, 1994 – Venezuela
- Stethorrhagus limbatus Simon, 1896 (type) – Brazil, Guyana
- Stethorrhagus lupulus Simon, 1896 – Colombia, Venezuela, Peru, Brazil
- Stethorrhagus maculatus (L. Koch, 1866) – Colombia
- Stethorrhagus nigrinus (Berland, 1913) – Ecuador
- Stethorrhagus oxossi Bonaldo & Brescovit, 1994 – Brazil
- Stethorrhagus peckorum Bonaldo & Brescovit, 1994 – Venezuela
- Stethorrhagus penai Bonaldo & Brescovit, 1994 – Ecuador
- Stethorrhagus planada Bonaldo & Brescovit, 1994 – Colombia
- Stethorrhagus roraimae Gertsch, 1942 – Brazil
- Stethorrhagus tridentatus Caporiacco, 1955 – Venezuela
