= Mazax =

Scientific classification
- Kingdom: Animalia
- Phylum: Arthropoda
- Subphylum: Chelicerata
- Class: Arachnida
- Order: Araneae
- Infraorder: Araneomorphae
- Family: Corinnidae
- Genus: Mazax; O. Pickard-Cambridge, 1898

Type species
- M. pax Reiskind, 1969

Species
- 7, see text

Genus of spiders

Mazax is a genus of corinnid sac spiders first described by O. Pickard-Cambridge in 1898.

== Species ==
As of July 2025 it contains ten species from the Americas and the Caribbean:

- Mazax ajax Reiskind, 1969 – Mexico
- Mazax chickeringi Reiskind, 1969 – Jamaica
- Mazax kaspari Cokendolpher, 1978 – USA
- Mazax leonidas -Colombia
- Mazax mokana - Colombia and Venezuela
- Mazax pax Reiskind, 1969 (type) – USA to Panama
- Mazax ramirezi Rubio & Danişman, 2014 – Argentina
- Mazax spinosa (Simon, 1898) – Central America, Lesser Antilles
- Mazax tembe - Brazil
- Mazax xerxes Reiskind, 1969 – Costa Rica
