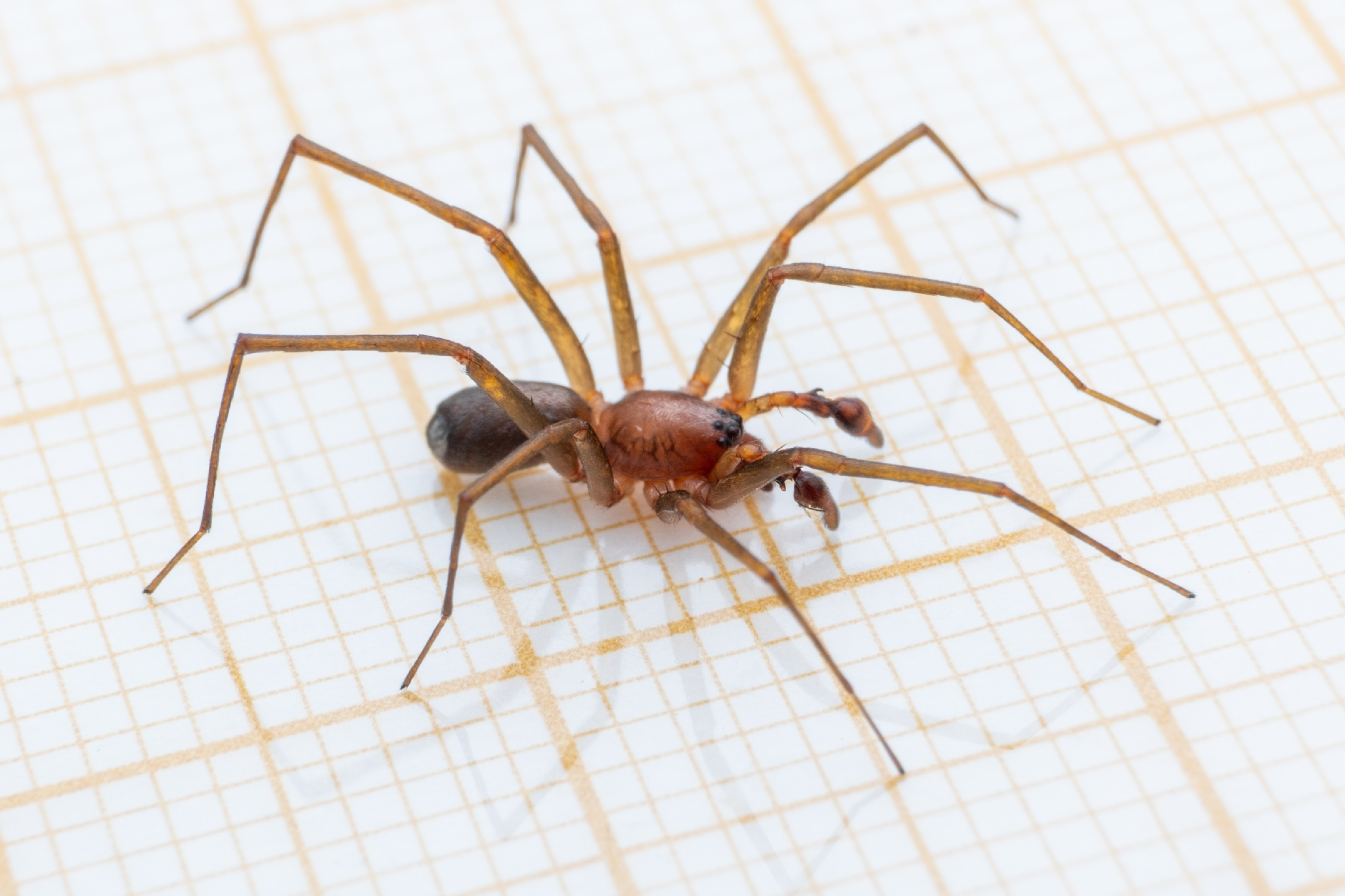
- Parachemmis hassleri

Scientific classification
- Kingdom: Animalia
- Phylum: Arthropoda
- Subphylum: Chelicerata
- Class: Arachnida
- Order: Araneae
- Infraorder: Araneomorphae
- Family: Corinnidae
- Genus: Parachemmis; Chickering, 1937

Type species
- P. fuscus Chickering, 1937

Species
- 4, see text

= Parachemmis =

Genus of spiders

Parachemmis is a genus of corinnid sac spiders first described by Arthur M. Chickering in 1937 as a genus of ground spiders. It was transferred to Liocranidae in 1969, and to Corinnidae in 1994.

== Species ==
As of April 2019 it contains four species in Central and South America:

- Parachemmis fuscus Chickering, 1937 (type) – Panama
- Parachemmis hassleri (Gertsch, 1942) – Guyana
- Parachemmis julioblancoi Martinez-G & Villarreal, 2017 – Colombia
- Parachemmis manauara Bonaldo, 2000 – Brazil
