= Iridonyssus =

Scientific classification
- Kingdom: Animalia
- Phylum: Arthropoda
- Subphylum: Chelicerata
- Class: Arachnida
- Order: Araneae
- Infraorder: Araneomorphae
- Family: Corinnidae
- Genus: Iridonyssus; Raven

Species
- Iridonyssus auripilosus Raven, 2015; Iridonyssus formicans Raven, 2015; Iridonyssus kohouti Raven, 2015; Iridonyssus leucostaurus Raven, 2015

Genus of spiders

Iridonyssus is a genus of spiders in the family Corinnidae. It was first described in 2015 by Raven. As of 2016 it contains 4 species from Australia.
