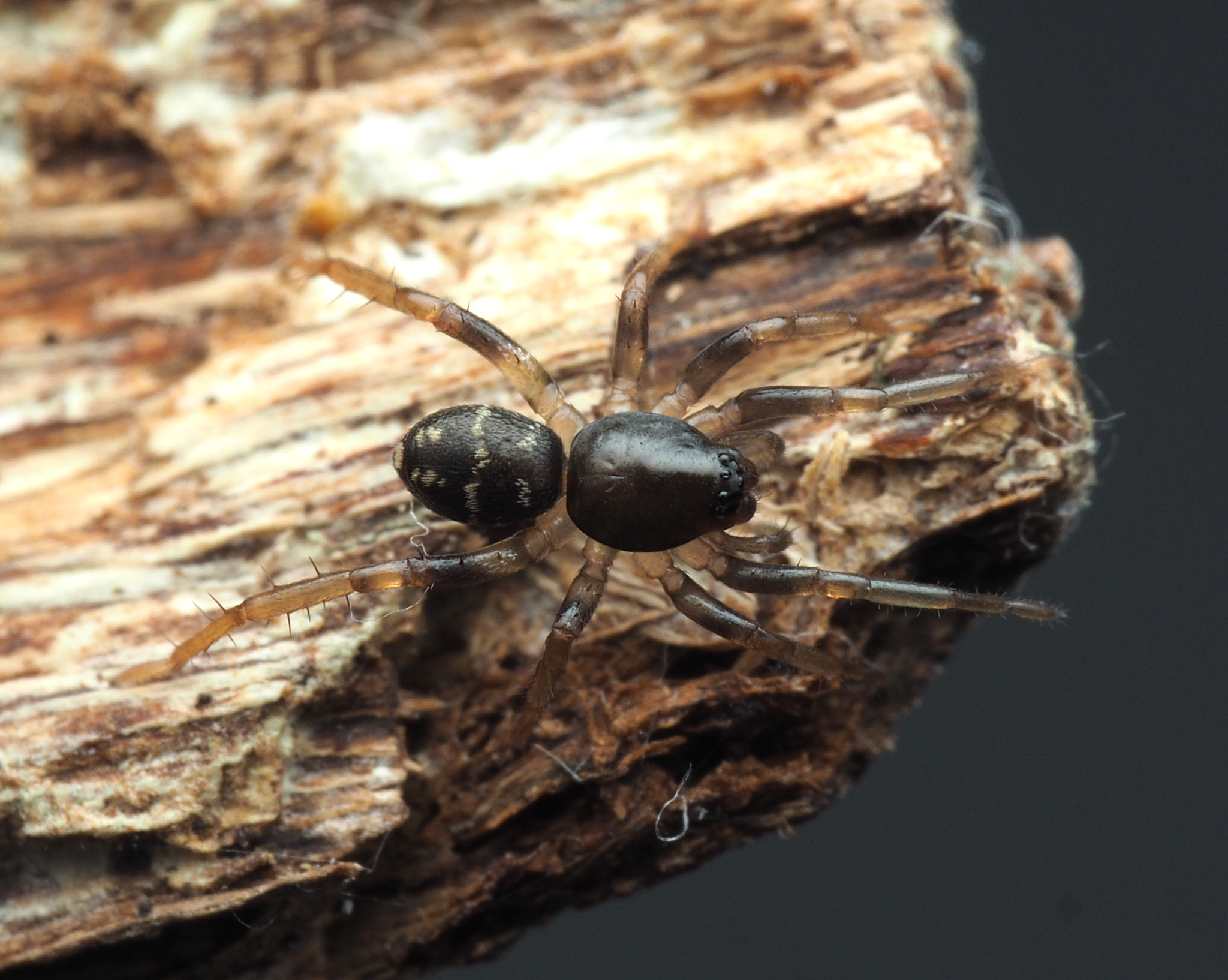
- Disnyssus judidenchae

Scientific classification
- Domain: Eukaryota
- Kingdom: Animalia
- Phylum: Arthropoda
- Subphylum: Chelicerata
- Class: Arachnida
- Order: Araneae
- Infraorder: Araneomorphae
- Family: Corinnidae
- Genus: Disnyssus; Raven

Species
- Disnyssus helenmirrenae Raven, 2015; Disnyssus judidenchae Raven, 2015

= Disnyssus =

Genus of spiders

Disnyssus is a genus of spiders in the family Corinnidae. It was first described in 2015 by Raven. As of 2016 it contains 2 species, both from Queensland.
