= Battalus =

Scientific classification
- Kingdom: Animalia
- Phylum: Arthropoda
- Subphylum: Chelicerata
- Class: Arachnida
- Order: Araneae
- Infraorder: Araneomorphae
- Family: Corinnidae
- Genus: Battalus; Karsch, 1878

Type species
- B. spinipes Karsch, 1878

Species
- 13, see text

Genus of spiders

Battalus is a genus of Australian corinnid sac spiders first described by Ferdinand Karsch in 1878. Originally placed with the ground spiders, it was moved to the Corinnidae in 2015.

== Species ==
As of April 2019 it contains thirteen species:

- Battalus adamparsonsi Raven, 2015 — Australia (Queensland, New South Wales, Victoria)
- Battalus baehrae Raven, 2015 — Australia (South Australia)
- Battalus bidgemia Raven, 2015 — Australia (Western Australia, Queensland)
- Battalus boolathana Raven, 2015 — Australia (Western Australia)
- Battalus byrneae Raven, 2015 — Australia (Tasmania)
- Battalus diadens Raven, 2015 — Australia (Queensland, New South Wales, Victoria)
- Battalus helenstarkae Raven, 2015 — Australia (South Australia)
- Battalus microspinosus Raven, 2015 — Australia (Western Australia, South Australia)
- Battalus rugosus Raven, 2015 — Australia (Western Australia, South Australia)
- Battalus semiflavus (Simon, 1896) — Australia (Queensland)
- Battalus spinipes Karsch, 1878 — Australia (Queensland)
- Battalus wallum Raven, 2015 — Australia (Queensland, New South Wales)
- Battalus zuytdorp Raven, 2015 — Australia (Western Australia)
