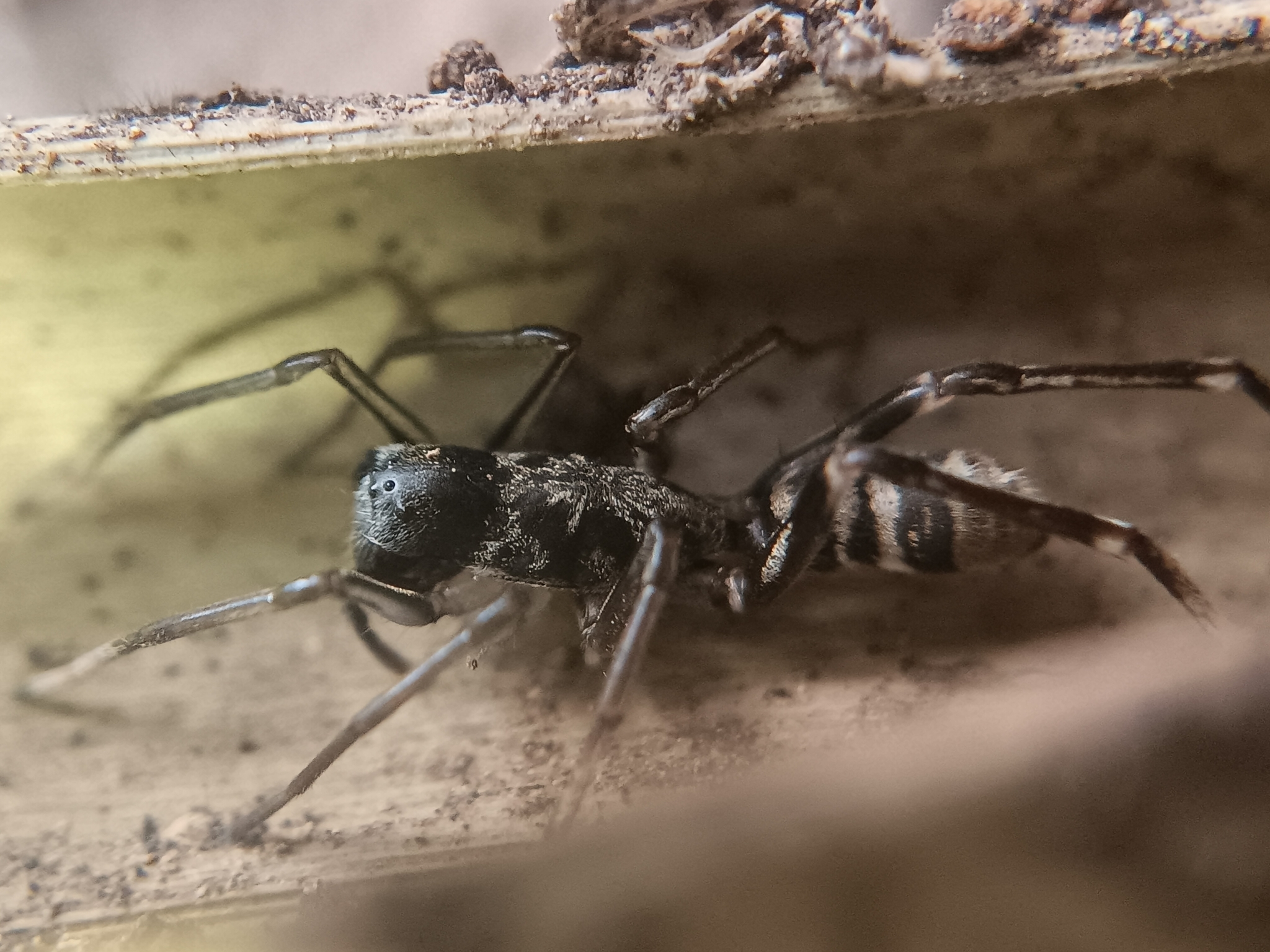

Scientific classification
- Domain: Eukaryota
- Kingdom: Animalia
- Phylum: Arthropoda
- Subphylum: Chelicerata
- Class: Arachnida
- Order: Araneae
- Infraorder: Araneomorphae
- Family: Corinnidae
- Genus: Serendib; Deeleman-Reinhold, 2001

Type species
- S. volans Deeleman-Reinhold, 2001

Species
- S. muadai Jäger, Nophaseud & Praxaysombath, 2012 – Laos; S. suthepica Deeleman-Reinhold, 2001 – Thailand, Indonesia (Bali); S. volans Deeleman-Reinhold, 2001 – Thailand, Indonesia (Borneo)

= Serendib (spider) =

Genus of spiders

Serendib is a genus of Southeast Asian corinnid sac spiders erected by Christa L. Deeleman-Reinhold in 2001. As of April 2019 it contains only three species.
