= Fluctus =

Scientific classification
- Kingdom: Animalia
- Phylum: Arthropoda
- Subphylum: Chelicerata
- Class: Arachnida
- Order: Araneae
- Infraorder: Araneomorphae
- Family: Corinnidae
- Genus: Fluctus; Jin & Zhang, 2020

Type species
- F. bannaensis Jin & Zhang, 2020

Species
- Fluctus bannaensis Jin & Zhang, 2020; Fluctus tengchongensis Jin & Zhang, 2020

Genus of spiders

Fluctus is a small genus of east Asian corinnid sac spiders. It was first described by C. Jin and F. Zhang in 2020, and it has only been found in China. As of November 2021 it contains only two species: F. bannaensis and F. tengchongensis.
