= Ianduba =

Scientific classification
- Domain: Eukaryota
- Kingdom: Animalia
- Phylum: Arthropoda
- Subphylum: Chelicerata
- Class: Arachnida
- Order: Araneae
- Infraorder: Araneomorphae
- Family: Corinnidae
- Genus: Ianduba; Bonaldo, 1997

Type species
- I. vatapa Bonaldo, 1997

Species
- 15, see text

Genus of spiders

Ianduba is a genus of South American corinnid sac spiders first described by A. B. Bonaldo in 1997.

== Species ==
As of April 2019 it contains fifteen species found in Brazil and Argentina:

- Ianduba abara Bonaldo & Brescovit, 2007 – Brazil
- Ianduba acaraje Magalhaes, Fernandes, Ramírez & Bonaldo, 2016 – Brazil
- Ianduba angeloi Magalhaes, Fernandes, Ramírez & Bonaldo, 2016 – Brazil
- Ianduba apururuca Magalhaes, Fernandes, Ramírez & Bonaldo, 2016 – Brazil
- Ianduba beaga Magalhaes, Fernandes, Ramírez & Bonaldo, 2016 – Brazil
- Ianduba benjori Magalhaes, Fernandes, Ramírez & Bonaldo, 2016 – Brazil
- Ianduba capixaba Magalhaes, Fernandes, Ramírez & Bonaldo, 2016 – Brazil
- Ianduba caxixe Bonaldo, 1997 – Brazil
- Ianduba dabadu Magalhaes, Fernandes, Ramírez & Bonaldo, 2016 – Brazil
- Ianduba liberta Magalhaes, Fernandes, Ramírez & Bonaldo, 2016 – Brazil
- Ianduba mugunza Bonaldo & Brescovit, 2007 – Brazil
- Ianduba patua Bonaldo, 1997 – Brazil
- Ianduba paubrasil Bonaldo, 1997 – Brazil
- Ianduba varia (Keyserling, 1891) – Brazil, Argentina
- Ianduba vatapa Bonaldo, 1997 (type) – Brazil
