= Xeropigo =

Scientific classification
- Domain: Eukaryota
- Kingdom: Animalia
- Phylum: Arthropoda
- Subphylum: Chelicerata
- Class: Arachnida
- Order: Araneae
- Infraorder: Araneomorphae
- Family: Corinnidae
- Genus: Xeropigo; O. Pickard-Cambridge, 1882

Type species
- X. tridentiger (O. Pickard-Cambridge, 1870)

Species
- 17, see text

Genus of spiders

Xeropigo is a genus of South American and Caribbean corinnid sac spiders first described by O. Pickard-Cambridge in 1882.

== Species ==
As of April 2019 it contains seventeen species:

- Xeropigo aitatu Carvalho, Shimano, Candiani & Bonaldo, 2016 – Brazil
- Xeropigo brescoviti De Souza & Bonaldo, 2007 – Bolivia
- Xeropigo cajuina Carvalho, Shimano, Candiani & Bonaldo, 2016 – Brazil
- Xeropigo camilae De Souza & Bonaldo, 2007 – Brazil
- Xeropigo candango De Souza & Bonaldo, 2007 – Brazil
- Xeropigo canga Carvalho, Shimano, Candiani & Bonaldo, 2016 – Brazil
- Xeropigo cotijuba De Souza & Bonaldo, 2007 – Guiana, Brazil
- Xeropigo crispim Carvalho, Shimano, Candiani & Bonaldo, 2016 – Brazil
- Xeropigo oxente Carvalho, Shimano, Candiani & Bonaldo, 2016 – Brazil
- Xeropigo pachitea De Souza & Bonaldo, 2007 – Peru, Brazil
- Xeropigo perene De Souza & Bonaldo, 2007 – Peru, Brazil
- Xeropigo piripiri Carvalho, Shimano, Candiani & Bonaldo, 2016 – Brazil
- Xeropigo rheimsae De Souza & Bonaldo, 2007 – Brazil
- Xeropigo smedigari (Caporiacco, 1955) – Venezuela, Trinidad
- Xeropigo tridentiger (O. Pickard-Cambridge, 1870) (type) – USA, Caribbean to Brazil, St. Helena
  - Xeropigo t. reichardti (Strand, 1916) – Cayman Is. (Grand Cayman)
- Xeropigo ufo Carvalho, Shimano, Candiani & Bonaldo, 2016 – Brazil
