= Wasaka =

Scientific classification
- Kingdom: Animalia
- Phylum: Arthropoda
- Subphylum: Chelicerata
- Class: Arachnida
- Order: Araneae
- Infraorder: Araneomorphae
- Family: Corinnidae
- Genus: Wasaka; Haddad, 2013

Type species
- W. occulta Haddad, 2013

Species
- 4, see text

Genus of spiders

Wasaka is a genus of African corinnid sac spiders first described by C. R. Haddad in 2013.

== Species ==
As of April 2019 it contains four species:

- Wasaka imitatrix Haddad, 2013 – Tanzania
- Wasaka montana Haddad, 2013 – Burundi, Rwanda, Uganda
- Wasaka occulta Haddad, 2013 (type) – Tanzania
- Wasaka ventralis Haddad, 2013 – Cameroon
