= Cycais =

Scientific classification
- Kingdom: Animalia
- Phylum: Arthropoda
- Subphylum: Chelicerata
- Class: Arachnida
- Order: Araneae
- Infraorder: Araneomorphae
- Family: Corinnidae
- Genus: Cycais; Thorell, 1877

Type species
- C. cylindrata Thorell, 1877

Species
- C. cylindrata Thorell, 1877 – Indonesia (Sulawesi); C. gracilis Karsch, 1879 – Japan

Genus of spiders

Cycais is a genus of Asian corinnid sac spiders first described by Tamerlan Thorell in 1877. As of April 2019 it contains only two species, one from Sulawesi and one from Japan.
