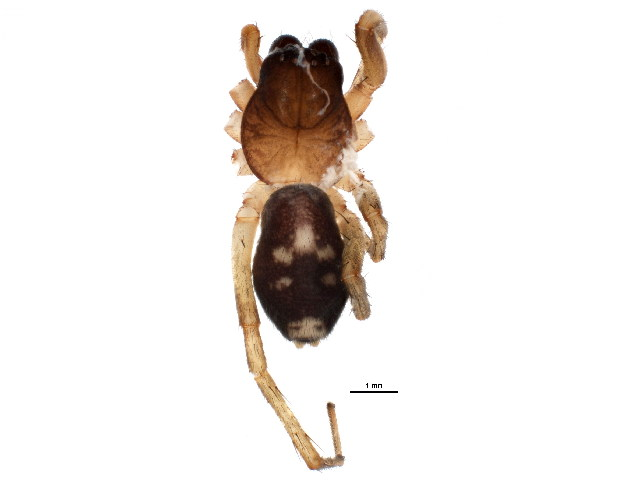
- F. gracilis, adult female

Scientific classification
- Domain: Eukaryota
- Kingdom: Animalia
- Phylum: Arthropoda
- Subphylum: Chelicerata
- Class: Arachnida
- Order: Araneae
- Infraorder: Araneomorphae
- Family: Corinnidae
- Genus: Falconina; Brignoli, 1985

Type species
- F. melloi (Schenkel, 1953)

Species
- 10, see text

= Falconina =

Genus of spiders

Falconina is a genus of corinnid sac spiders first described by Paolo Brignoli in 1985.

== Species ==
As of August 2024 it contains eleven species:

- Falconina adriki García & Bonaldo, 2023 – Brazil
- Falconina albomaculosa (Schmidt, 1971) – Ecuador
- Falconina andresi García & Bonaldo, 2023 – Colombia
- Falconina brignolii García & Bonaldo, 2023 – Venezuela
- Falconina catirina García & Bonaldo, 2023 – Brazil
- Falconina crassipalpis (Chickering, 1937) – Panama
- Falconina gracilis (Keyserling, 1891) – South America, Introduced to USA, Cuba
- Falconina iza García & Bonaldo, 2023 – Brazil
- Falconina melloi (Schenkel, 1953) (type) – Colombia, Venezuela
- Falconina taita García & Bonaldo, 2023 – Bolivia
- Falconina cafetera Ibarra-Núñez & Marín, 2024
