= Nucastia =

Scientific classification
- Domain: Eukaryota
- Kingdom: Animalia
- Phylum: Arthropoda
- Subphylum: Chelicerata
- Class: Arachnida
- Order: Araneae
- Infraorder: Araneomorphae
- Family: Corinnidae
- Genus: Nucastia; Raven

Species
- Nucastia culburra Raven, 2015; Nucastia eneabba Raven, 2015; Nucastia muncoonie Raven, 2015; Nucastia supunnoides Raven, 2015; Nucastia virewoods Raven, 2015

Genus of spiders

Nucastia is a genus of spiders in the family Corinnidae. It was first described in 2015 by Raven. As of 2016 it contains 5 species from Australia.
