= Griswoldella =

Scientific classification
- Kingdom: Animalia
- Phylum: Arthropoda
- Subphylum: Chelicerata
- Class: Arachnida
- Order: Araneae
- Infraorder: Araneomorphae
- Family: Corinnidae
- Genus: Griswoldella; Haddad, 2021
- Species: G. aculifera

Binomial name
- Griswoldella aculifera (Strand, 1916)

Genus of spiders

Griswoldella is a monotypic genus of east African corinnid sac spiders, containing a single species, Griswoldella aculifera. It was first described by C. R. Haddad in 2021, and it has only been found in Madagascar.
