= Castoponera =

Scientific classification
- Domain: Eukaryota
- Kingdom: Animalia
- Phylum: Arthropoda
- Subphylum: Chelicerata
- Class: Arachnida
- Order: Araneae
- Infraorder: Araneomorphae
- Family: Corinnidae
- Genus: Castoponera; Deeleman-Reinhold, 2001

Type species
- C. ciliata (Deeleman-Reinhold, 1993)

Species
- 4, see text

Genus of spiders

Castoponera is a genus of Southeast Asian corinnid sac spiders first described by Christa L. Deeleman-Reinhold in 2001.

== Species ==
As of April 2019 it contains four species:

- Castoponera christae Yamasaki, 2016 – Borneo
- Castoponera ciliata (Deeleman-Reinhold, 1993) (type) – Malaysia, Indonesia (Sumatra)
- Castoponera lecythus Deeleman-Reinhold, 2001 – Borneo
- Castoponera scotopoda (Deeleman-Reinhold, 1993) – Borneo
