= Ticopa =

Scientific classification
- Domain: Eukaryota
- Kingdom: Animalia
- Phylum: Arthropoda
- Subphylum: Chelicerata
- Class: Arachnida
- Order: Araneae
- Infraorder: Araneomorphae
- Family: Corinnidae
- Genus: Ticopa; Raven

Type species
- Ticopa australis

Species
- 6, see text

Genus of spiders

Ticopa is a genus of spiders in the family Corinnidae. It was first described in 2015 by Raven. As of 2017, it contains 6 species, all from Australia.

== Species ==
Ticopa comprises the following species:

- Ticopa australis Raven, 2015
- Ticopa carnarvon Raven, 2015
- Ticopa chinchilla Raven, 2015
- Ticopa dingo Raven, 2015
- Ticopa hudsoni Raven, 2015
- Ticopa longbottomi Raven, 2015
