= Tupirinna =

Scientific classification
- Domain: Eukaryota
- Kingdom: Animalia
- Phylum: Arthropoda
- Subphylum: Chelicerata
- Class: Arachnida
- Order: Araneae
- Infraorder: Araneomorphae
- Family: Corinnidae
- Genus: Tupirinna; Bonaldo, 2000

Type species
- T. rosae Bonaldo, 2000

Species
- 20, see text

Genus of spiders

Tupirinna is a genus of corinnid sac spiders first described by A. B. Bonaldo in 2000.

== Species ==
As of May 2022 it contains the following twenty species:

- Tupirinna albofasciata (Mello-Leitão, 1943) – Brazil
- Tupirinna araguaia Xavier & Bonaldo, 2021 – Brazil
- Tupirinna caraca Xavier & Bonaldo, 2021 – Brazil
- Tupirinna coari Xavier & Bonaldo, 2021 – Brazil
- Tupirinna cruzes Xavier & Bonaldo, 2021 – Brazil
- Tupirinna gigantea Xavier & Bonaldo, 2021 – Colombia, Peru
- Tupirinna goeldi Xavier & Bonaldo, 2021 – Brazil
- Tupirinna ibiapaba Xavier & Bonaldo, 2021 – Brazil
- Tupirinna lata Xavier & Bonaldo, 2021 – Brazil
- Tupirinna luctuosa Xavier & Bonaldo, 2021 – Brazil
- Tupirinna mutum Xavier & Bonaldo, 2021 – Brazil
- Tupirinna oba Xavier & Bonaldo, 2021 – Brazil
- Tupirinna palmares Xavier & Bonaldo, 2021 – Brazil
- Tupirinna platnicki Xavier & Bonaldo, 2021 – Brazil
- Tupirinna regiae Xavier & Bonaldo, 2021 – Brazil
- Tupirinna rosae Bonaldo, 2000 – Venezuela, Brazil
- Tupirinna trilineata (Chickering, 1937) – Panama
- Tupirinna una Xavier & Bonaldo, 2021 – Brazil
- Tupirinna urucu Xavier & Bonaldo, 2021 – Brazil
- Tupirinna zebra Xavier & Bonaldo, 2021 – Brazil
