= Brachyphaea =

Scientific classification
- Kingdom: Animalia
- Phylum: Arthropoda
- Subphylum: Chelicerata
- Class: Arachnida
- Order: Araneae
- Infraorder: Araneomorphae
- Family: Corinnidae
- Genus: Brachyphaea; Simon, 1895

Type species
- B. simoni Simon, 1895

Species
- 7, see text

Genus of spiders

Brachyphaea is a genus of African corinnid sac spiders first described by W. Bösenberg & Heinrich Lenz in 1895.

== Species ==
As of April 2019 it contains seven species:

- Brachyphaea berlandi Lessert, 1915 – East Africa
- Brachyphaea castanea Simon, 1896 – Tanzania (Zanzibar)
- Brachyphaea hulli Lessert, 1921 – East Africa
- Brachyphaea proxima Lessert, 1921 – East Africa
- Brachyphaea simoni Simon, 1895 (type) – East Africa
- Brachyphaea simpliciaculeata Caporiacco, 1949 – Kenya
- Brachyphaea vulpina Simon, 1896 – Mozambique
