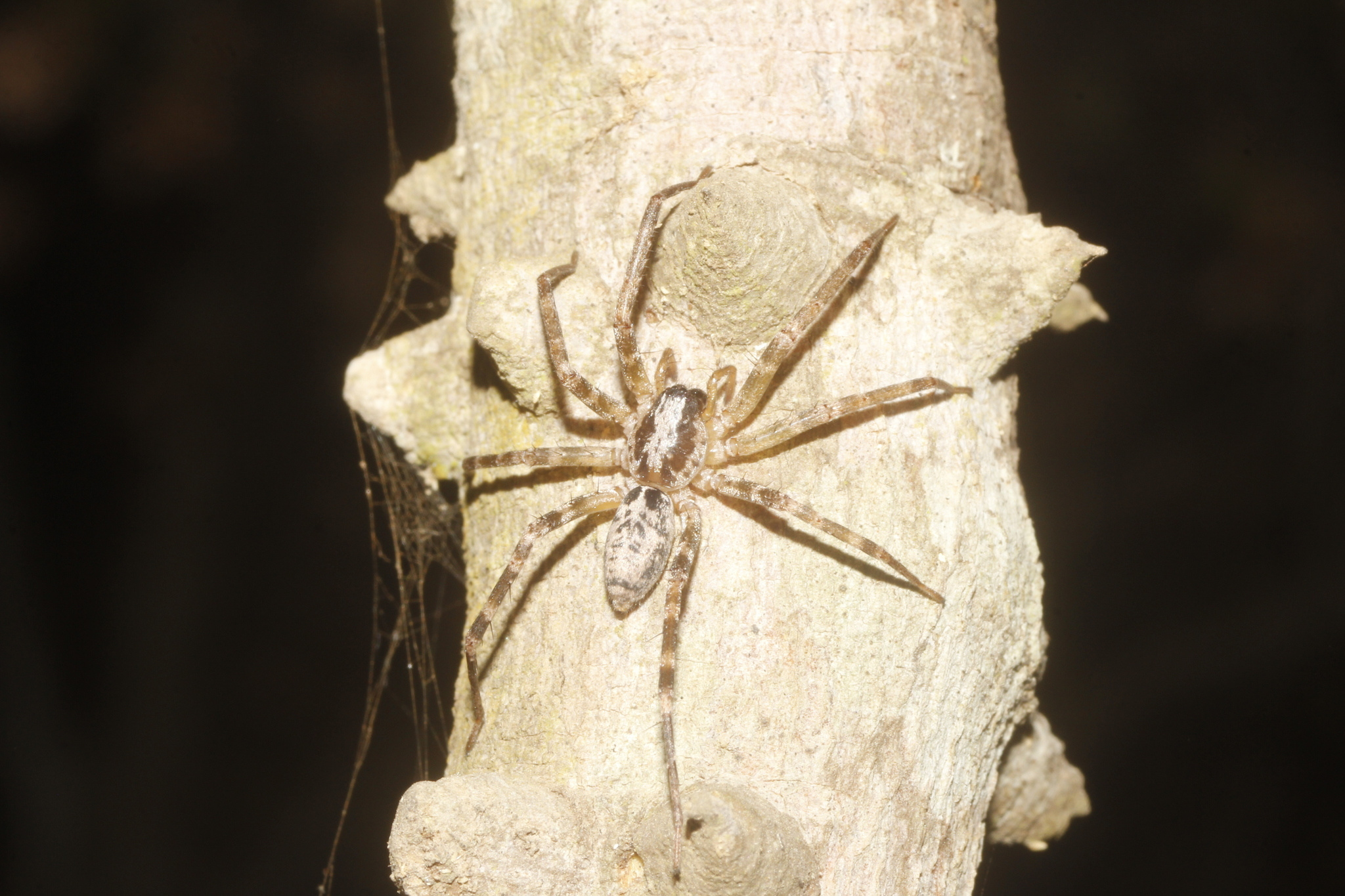
- Megalostrata sp.

Scientific classification
- Domain: Eukaryota
- Kingdom: Animalia
- Phylum: Arthropoda
- Subphylum: Chelicerata
- Class: Arachnida
- Order: Araneae
- Infraorder: Araneomorphae
- Family: Corinnidae
- Genus: Megalostrata; Karsch, 1880

Type species
- M. raptor (L. Koch, 1866)

Species
- 4, see text

= Megalostrata (spider) =

Megalostrata Temporal range: Neogene–present

Genus of spiders

Megalostrata is a genus of corinnid sac spiders first described by Ferdinand Karsch in 1880.

== Species ==
As of April 2019 it contains four species:

- Megalostrata bruneri (Bryant, 1936) – Cuba
- Megalostrata depicta (O. Pickard-Cambridge, 1895) – Mexico
- Megalostrata monistica (Chamberlin, 1924) – Mexico
- Megalostrata raptor (L. Koch, 1866) (type) – Mexico to Panama
