= Fengzhen (spider) =

Scientific classification
- Kingdom: Animalia
- Phylum: Arthropoda
- Subphylum: Chelicerata
- Class: Arachnida
- Order: Araneae
- Infraorder: Araneomorphae
- Family: Corinnidae
- Genus: Fengzhen; Lu & Li, 2023
- Species: F. mengla

Binomial name
- Fengzhen mengla Lu & Li, 2023

Species of spider

Fengzhen is a monotypic genus of spiders in the family Corinnidae containing the single species, Fengzhen mengla.

== Distribution ==
Fengzhen mengla has been recorded from Yunnan province in China.

== Etymology ==
The genus is named after Chinese arachnologist Fengzhen Wang (Chinese: 王凤振; pinyin: Wáng fèngzhèn).

The species is named after the type locality 勐腊; Měnglà (Xishuangbanna, Mengla County).

== Description ==
Fengzhen are small-sized, non-ant-mimicking spiders with a reddish brown to yellowish carapace.
