= Carteronius =

Scientific classification
- Kingdom: Animalia
- Phylum: Arthropoda
- Subphylum: Chelicerata
- Class: Arachnida
- Order: Araneae
- Infraorder: Araneomorphae
- Family: Corinnidae
- Genus: Carteronius; Simon, 1896

Type species
- C. helluo Simon, 1896

Species
- 8, see text

Synonyms
- Mandane Karsch, 1880; Mandaneta Strand, 1932

Genus of spiders

Carteronius is a genus of African corinnid sac spiders first described by Eugène Simon in 1896.

== Species ==
As of November 2022 it contains eight species:

- Carteronius arboreus Bonaldo & Haddad, 2022 – DR Congo
- Carteronius ashanti Bonaldo & Silva-Junior, 2022 – Ghana
- Carteronius gentilis (Simon, 1909) – Cameroon, Equatorial Guinea
- Carteronius lumumba Bonaldo & Ramírez, 2022 – Cameroon, Gabon, DR Congo
- Carteronius myene Bonaldo & Labarque, 2022 – Gabon
- Carteronius simoni Bonaldo & Shimano, 2022 – Gabon
- Carteronius sudanus (Karsch, 1880) (type) – Guinea, Sierra Leone, Ivory Coast, Ghana, DR Congo
- Carteronius teke Bonaldo & Bosselaers, 2022 – DR Congo
