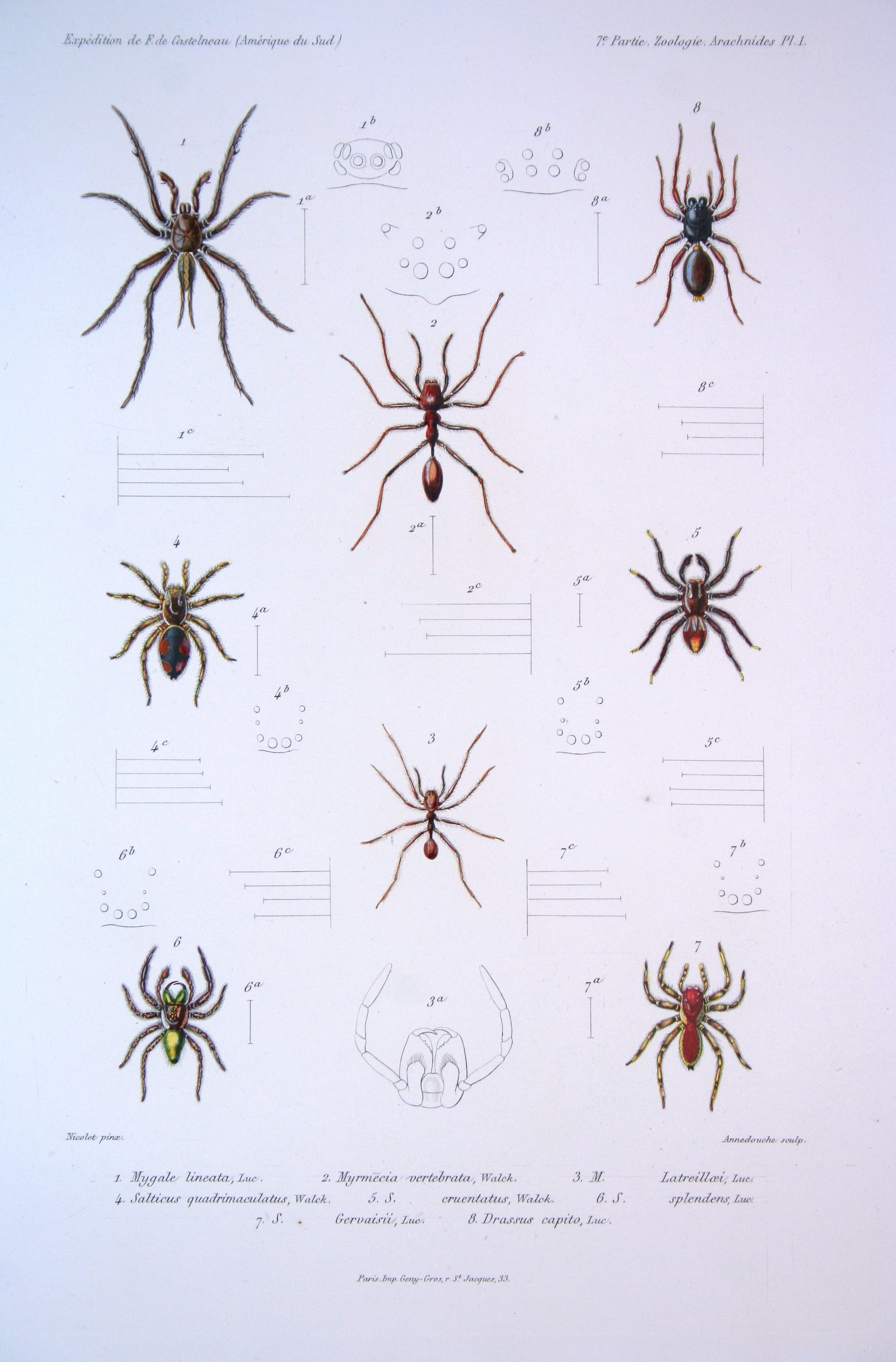
- 8: Drassus capito Luc. = Corinna capito (Lucas, 1856)

Scientific classification
- Kingdom: Animalia
- Phylum: Arthropoda
- Subphylum: Chelicerata
- Class: Arachnida
- Order: Araneae
- Infraorder: Araneomorphae
- Family: Corinnidae
- Genus: Corinna; C. L. Koch, 1841

Type species
- C. rubripes C. L. Koch, 1841

Species
- 85, see text

Synonyms
- Diestus Simon, 1898; Lausus Simon, 1898

= Corinna (spider) =

Corinna Temporal range: Neogene–present

Genus of spiders

Corinna is a genus of corinnid sac spiders first described by Carl Ludwig Koch in 1841. They are found in Mexico and south to Brazil, and with selected species found in Africa.

== Species ==
As of April 2019 it contains eighty-five species:

- C. aberrans Franganillo, 1926 — Cuba
- C. aechmea Rodrigues & Bonaldo, 2014 — Brazil
- C. aenea Simon, 1896 — Brazil
- C. alticeps (Keyserling, 1891) — Brazil
- C. andina (Simon, 1898) — Ecuador
- C. annulipes (Taczanowski, 1874) — Brazil, French Guiana, Peru
- C. anomala Schmidt, 1971 — Ecuador
- C. areolata Thorell, 1899 — Cameroon
- C. balacobaco Rodrigues & Bonaldo, 2014 — Brazil
- C. bicincta Simon, 1896 — Brazil
- C. bonneti Caporiacco, 1947 — Guyana
- C. botucatensis (Keyserling, 1891) — Brazil
- C. bristoweana Mello-Leitão, 1926 — Brazil
- C. brunneipeltula Strand, 1911 — New Guinea
- C. buccosa Simon, 1896 — Brazil (Amazonas)
- C. bulbosa F. O. Pickard-Cambridge, 1899 — Mexico to Panama
- C. bulbula F. O. Pickard-Cambridge, 1899 — Panama
- C. caatinga Rodrigues & Bonaldo, 2014 — Brazil
- C. capito (Lucas, 1857) — Brazil
- C. chickeringi (Caporiacco, 1955) — Venezuela
- C. colombo Bonaldo, 2000 — Brazil, Argentina
- C. corvina Simon, 1896 — Paraguay
- C. cribrata (Simon, 1886) — Tanzania (Zanzibar)
- C. cruenta (Bertkau, 1880) — Brazil
- C. demersa Rodrigues & Bonaldo, 2014 — Brazil
- C. ducke Bonaldo, 2000 — Brazil
- C. eresiformis Simon, 1896 — Brazil (Amazonas)
- C. escalvada Rodrigues & Bonaldo, 2014 — Brazil
- C. ferox Simon, 1896 — Brazil, Peru
- C. galeata Simon, 1896 — Brazil
- C. granadensis (L. Koch, 1866) — Colombia
- C. grandis (Simon, 1898) — Brazil, Guyana
- C. haemorrhoa (Bertkau, 1880) — Brazil
- C. hyalina Rodrigues & Bonaldo, 2014 — Brazil
- C. ignota Mello-Leitão, 1922 — Brazil
- C. inermis (Bertkau, 1880) — Brazil
- C. javuyae Petrunkevitch, 1930 — Puerto Rico
- C. jecatatu Rodrigues & Bonaldo, 2014 — Brazil
- C. kochi (Simon, 1898) — Colombia
- C. kuryi Rodrigues & Bonaldo, 2014 — Brazil
- C. loiolai Rodrigues & Bonaldo, 2014 — Brazil
- C. longitarsis Strand, 1906 — São Tomé and Príncipe
- C. loricata (Bertkau, 1880) — Brazil, Uruguay, Paraguay, Argentina
- C. macra (L. Koch, 1866) — Colombia
- C. major Berland, 1922 — Kenya
- C. mandibulata Strand, 1906 — Ethiopia
- C. maracas Rodrigues & Bonaldo, 2014 — Brazil
- C. mexicana (Banks, 1898) — Mexico
- C. modesta Banks, 1909 — Costa Rica
- C. mourai Bonaldo, 2000 — Brazil
- C. napaea Simon, 1898 — St. Vincent
- C. nitens (Keyserling, 1891) — Peru, Bolivia, Brazil, Uruguay, Paraguay, Argentina
- C. nossibeensis Strand, 1907 — Madagascar
- C. octodentata Franganillo, 1946 — Cuba
- C. olivacea Strand, 1906 — Ethiopia
- C. parva (Keyserling, 1891) — Brazil
- C. parvula Bryant, 1940 — Cuba, Hispaniola
- C. peninsulana Banks, 1898 — Mexico
- C. perida Chickering, 1972 — Panama
- C. phalerata Simon, 1896 — Brazil
- C. pictipes Banks, 1909 — Costa Rica
- C. plumipes (Bertkau, 1880) — Brazil
- C. propera (Dyal, 1935) — Pakistan
- C. pulchella (Bryant, 1948) — Dominican Rep.
- C. punicea Simon, 1898 — St. Vincent
- C. recurva Bonaldo, 2000 — Brazil
- C. regii Rodrigues & Bonaldo, 2014 — Brazil
- C. rubripes C. L. Koch, 1841 — Brazil, Guyana
- C. sanguinea Strand, 1906 — Ethiopia
  - Corinna s. inquirenda Strand, 1906 — Ethiopia
- C. selysi (Bertkau, 1880) — Brazil
- C. spinifera (Keyserling, 1887) — Nicaragua
- C. tatei Gertsch, 1942 — Venezuela
- C. telecoteco Rodrigues & Bonaldo, 2014 — Brazil
- C. testacea (Banks, 1898) — Mexico
- C. toussainti Bryant, 1948 — Hispaniola
- C. tranquilla Rodrigues & Bonaldo, 2014 — Brazil
- C. travassosi Mello-Leitão, 1939 — Brazil
- C. urbanae Soares & Camargo, 1948 — Brazil
- C. variegata F. O. Pickard-Cambridge, 1899 — Guatemala, Guyana
- C. venezuelica (Caporiacco, 1955) — Venezuela
- C. vesperata Rodrigues & Bonaldo, 2014 — Brazil
- C. vilanovae Rodrigues & Bonaldo, 2014 — Brazil
- C. zecarioca Rodrigues & Bonaldo, 2014 — Brazil
- C. ziriguidum Rodrigues & Bonaldo, 2014 — Brazil
