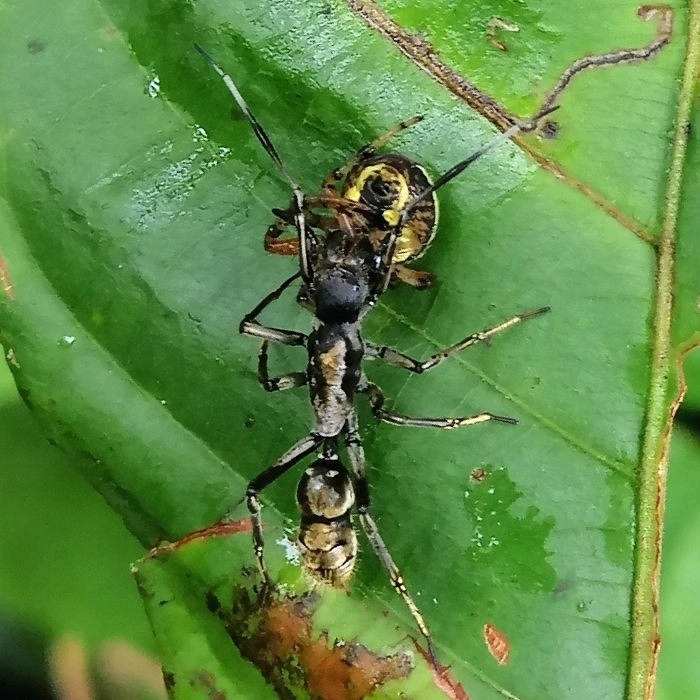
- Sphecotypus niger

Scientific classification
- Kingdom: Animalia
- Phylum: Arthropoda
- Subphylum: Chelicerata
- Class: Arachnida
- Order: Araneae
- Infraorder: Araneomorphae
- Family: Corinnidae
- Genus: Sphecotypus; O. Pickard-Cambridge, 1895

Type species
- S. niger (Perty, 1833)

Species
- 4, see text

= Sphecotypus =

Genus of spiders

Sphecotypus is a genus of corinnid sac spiders first described by O. Pickard-Cambridge in 1895.

== Species ==
As of April 2019 it contains four species:

- Sphecotypus birmanicus (Thorell, 1897) – Myanmar
- Sphecotypus borneensis Yamasaki, 2017 – Malaysia (Borneo)
- Sphecotypus niger (Perty, 1833) (type) – Nicaragua to Brazil
- Sphecotypus taprobanicus Simon, 1897 – Sri Lanka
