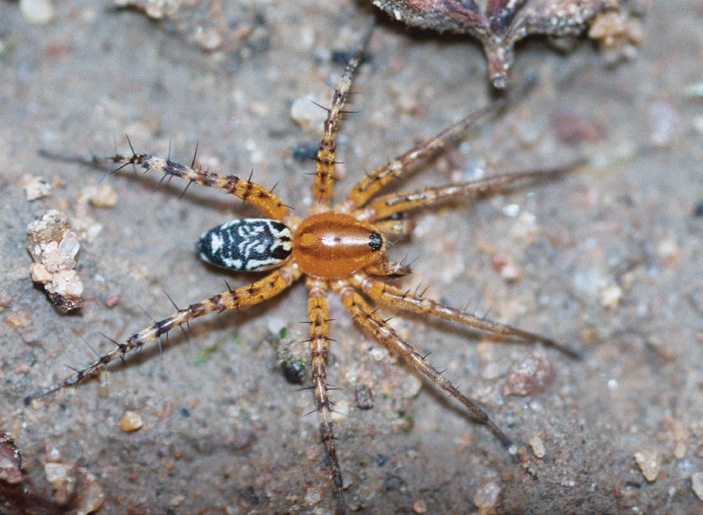
- Copa flavoplumosa
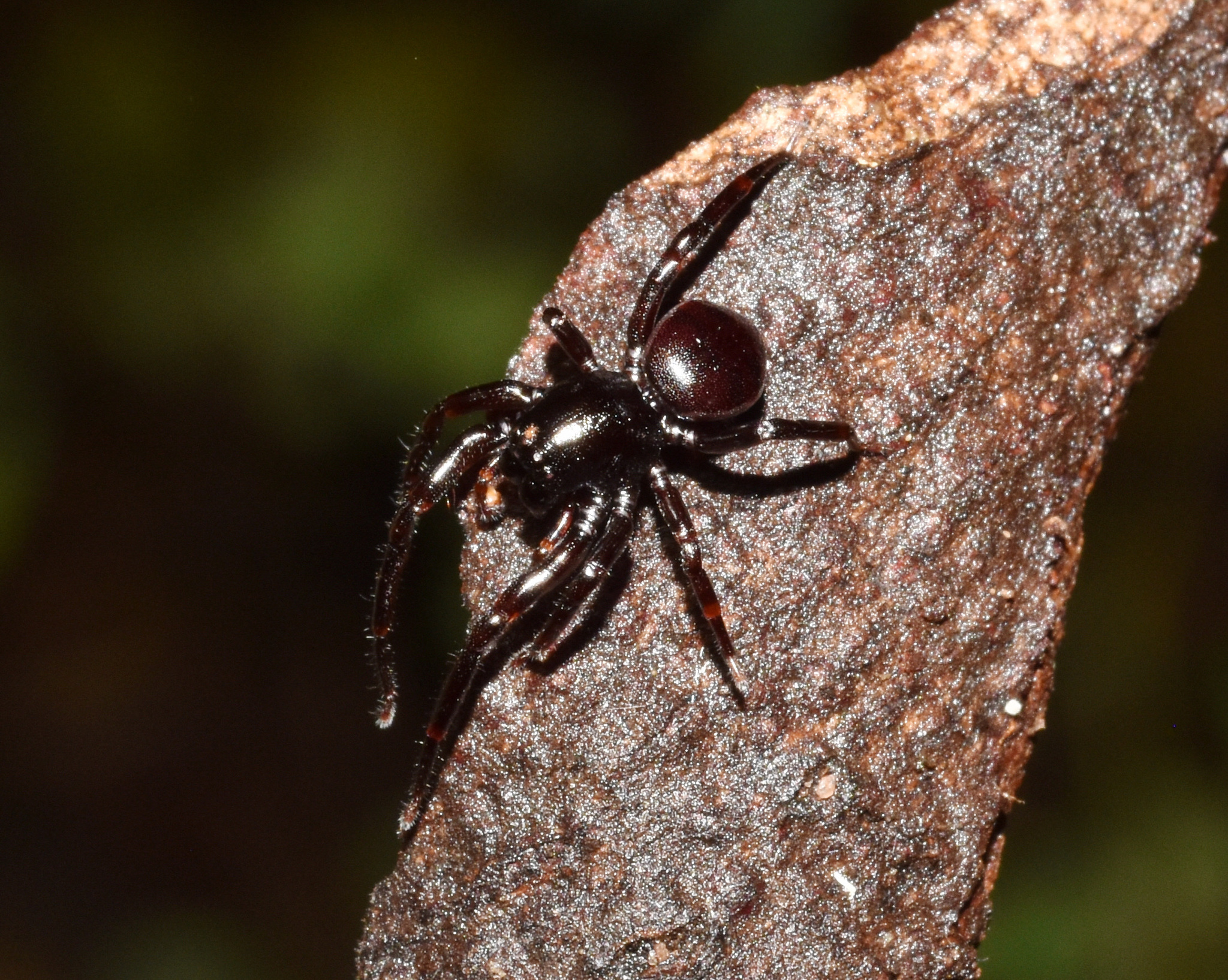
- Pronophaea natalica from South Africa

Scientific classification
- Kingdom: Animalia
- Phylum: Arthropoda
- Subphylum: Chelicerata
- Class: Arachnida
- Order: Araneae
- Infraorder: Araneomorphae
- Family: Corinnidae; Karsch, 1880

Diversity
- 76 genera, 800 species
- blue: reported countries (WSC) green: observation hotspots (iNaturalist)

= Corinnidae =

Corinnid sac spiders Temporal range: Palaeogene–present

Family of spiders

Corinnidae is a family of araneomorph spiders, sometimes called corinnid sac spiders. The family, like other "clubionoid" families, has a confusing taxonomic history. Once it was a part of the large catch-all taxon Clubionidae, now very much smaller.

The original members of the family are apparently similar only in that they have eight eyes arranged in two rows, conical anterior spinnerets that touch and are generally wandering predators that build silken retreats, or sacs, usually on plant terminals, between leaves, under bark or under rocks.

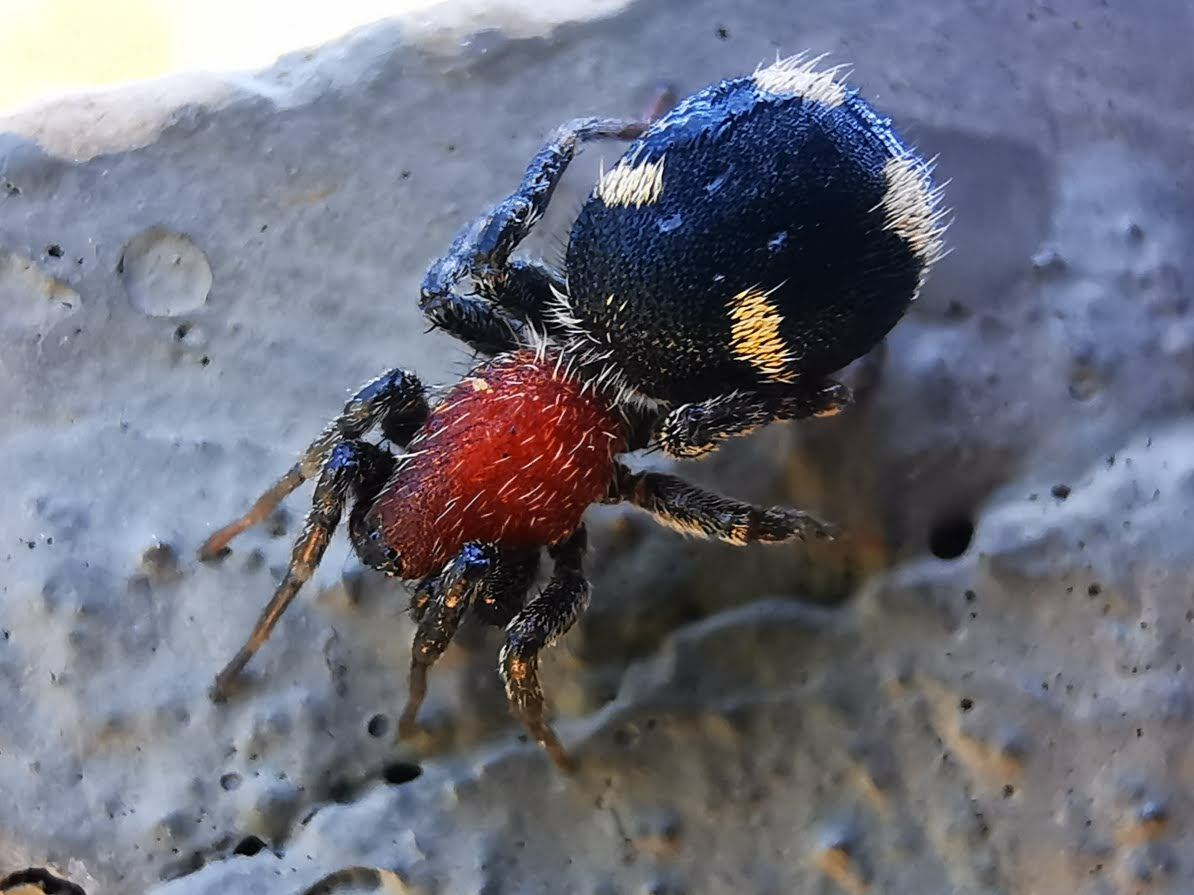
Graptartia granulosa from South Africa

In 2014, Martín Ramírez recognized the family in a restricted sense, including only the subfamilies Corinninae and Castianeirinae. Two former subfamilies of the Corinnidae are now treated as separate families, Phrurolithidae and Trachelidae. As now recognized, Corinnidae contains 71 genera and over 800 species worldwide.

Members of the genus Castianeira appear to be mimics of ants and velvet ants. Other corinnid ant-like genera include Mazax, Myrmecium and Myrmecotypus. Corinna is the type genus for the family and consists of small running spiders.

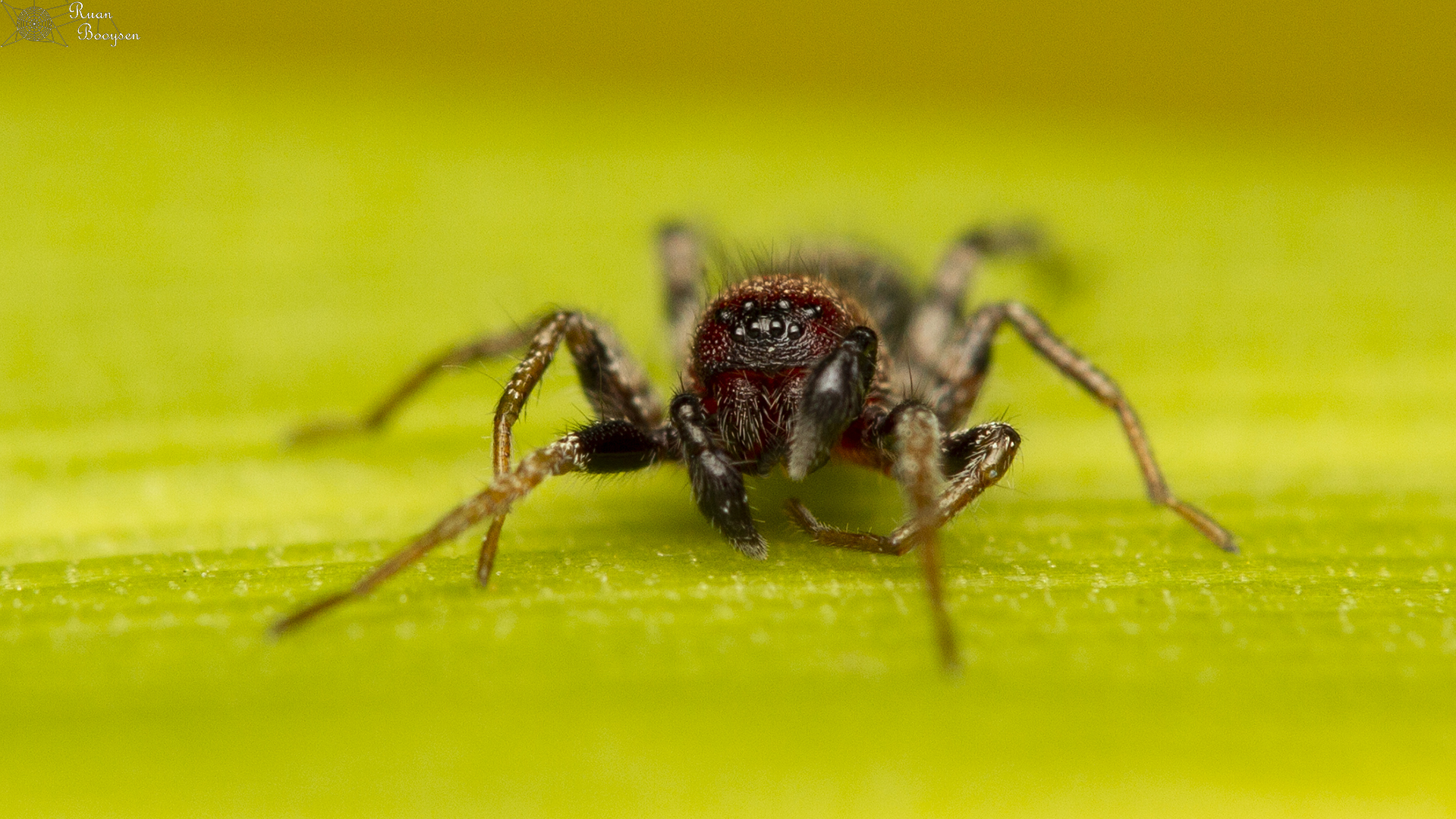
Front view of Coenoptychus mutillicus

== Genera ==
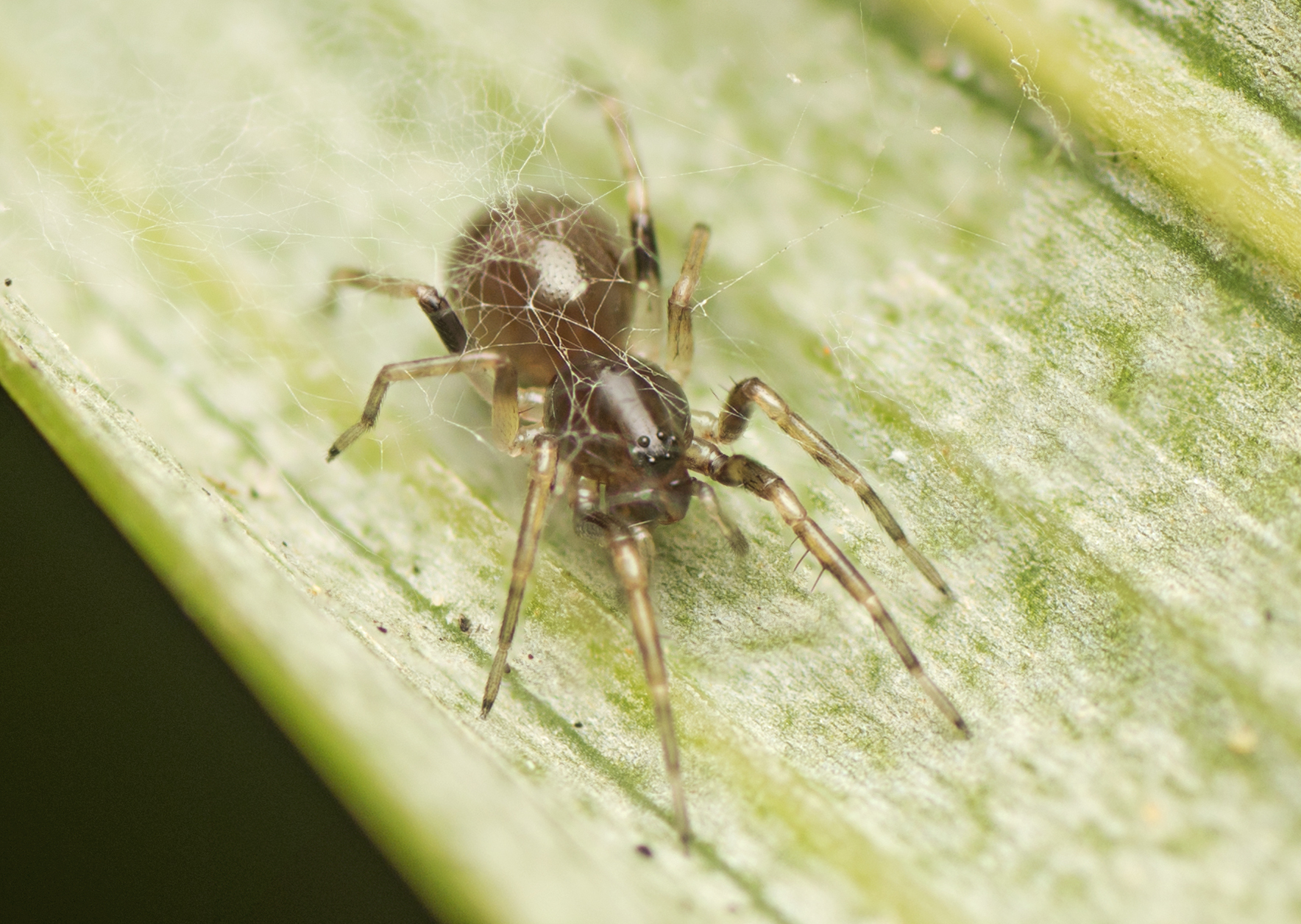
Battalus wallum

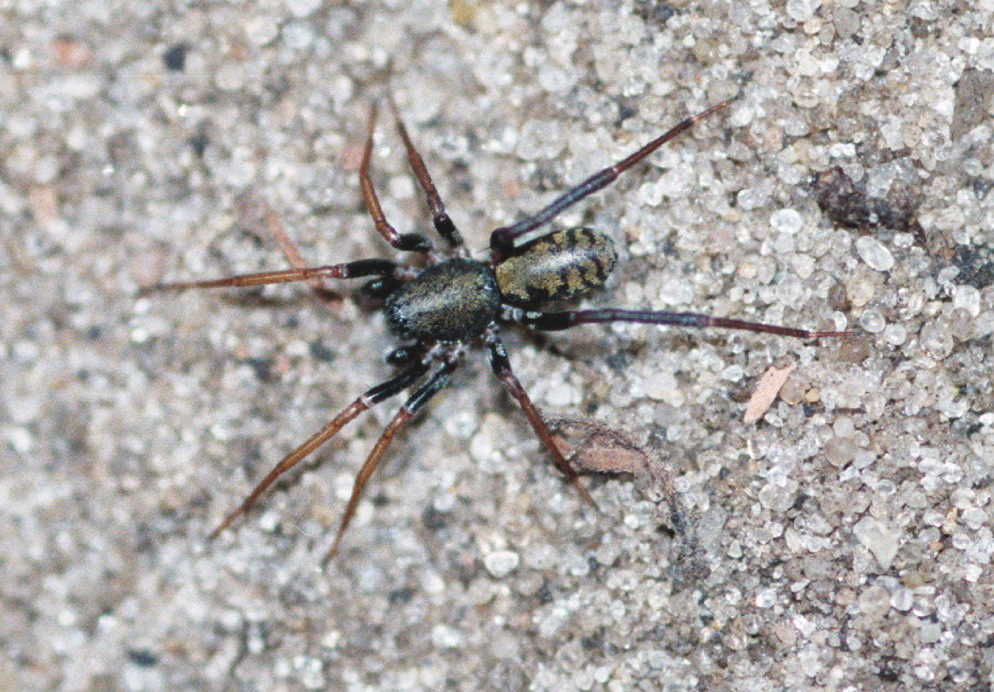
Cambalida dippenaarae

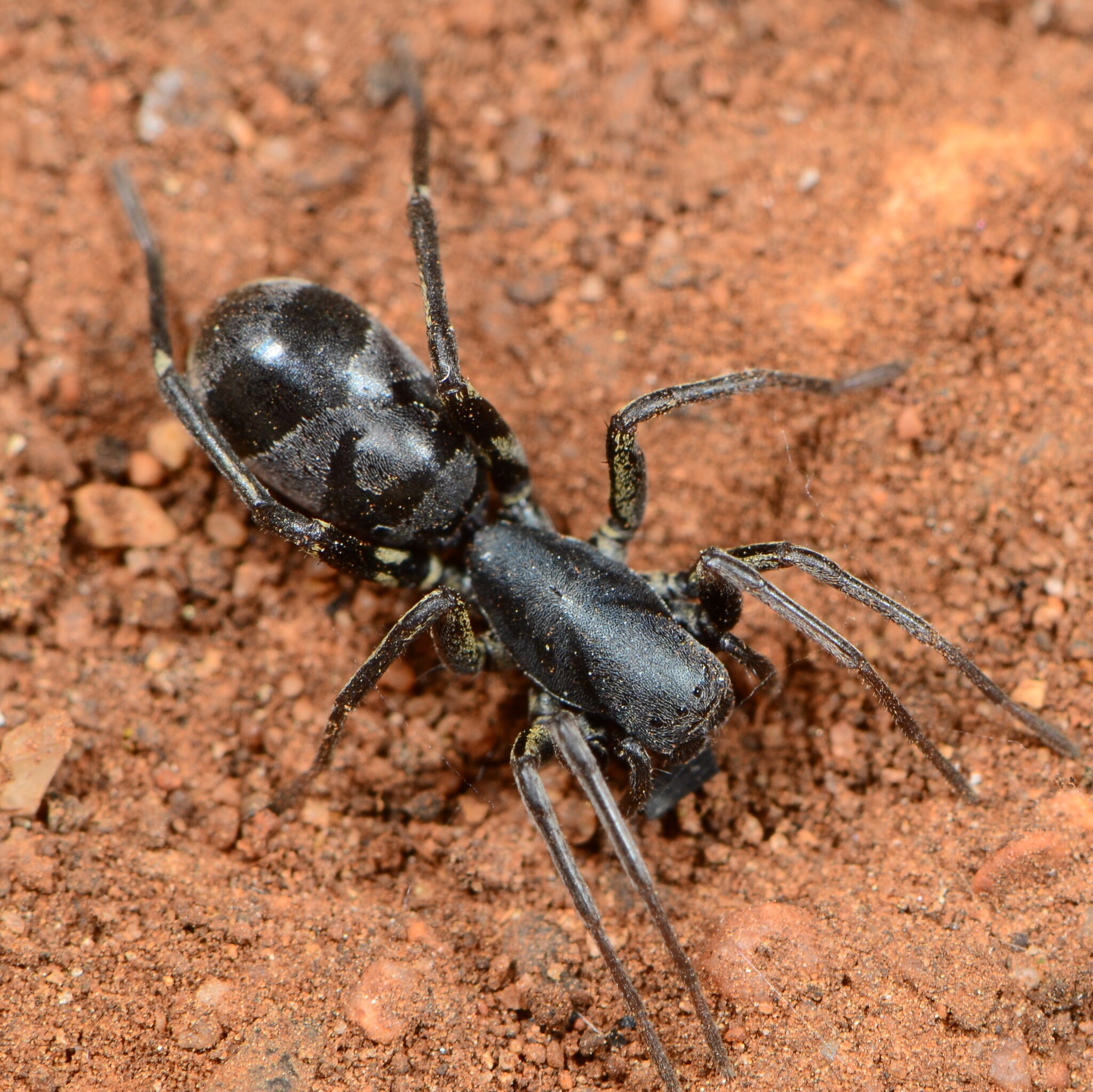
Merenius alberti

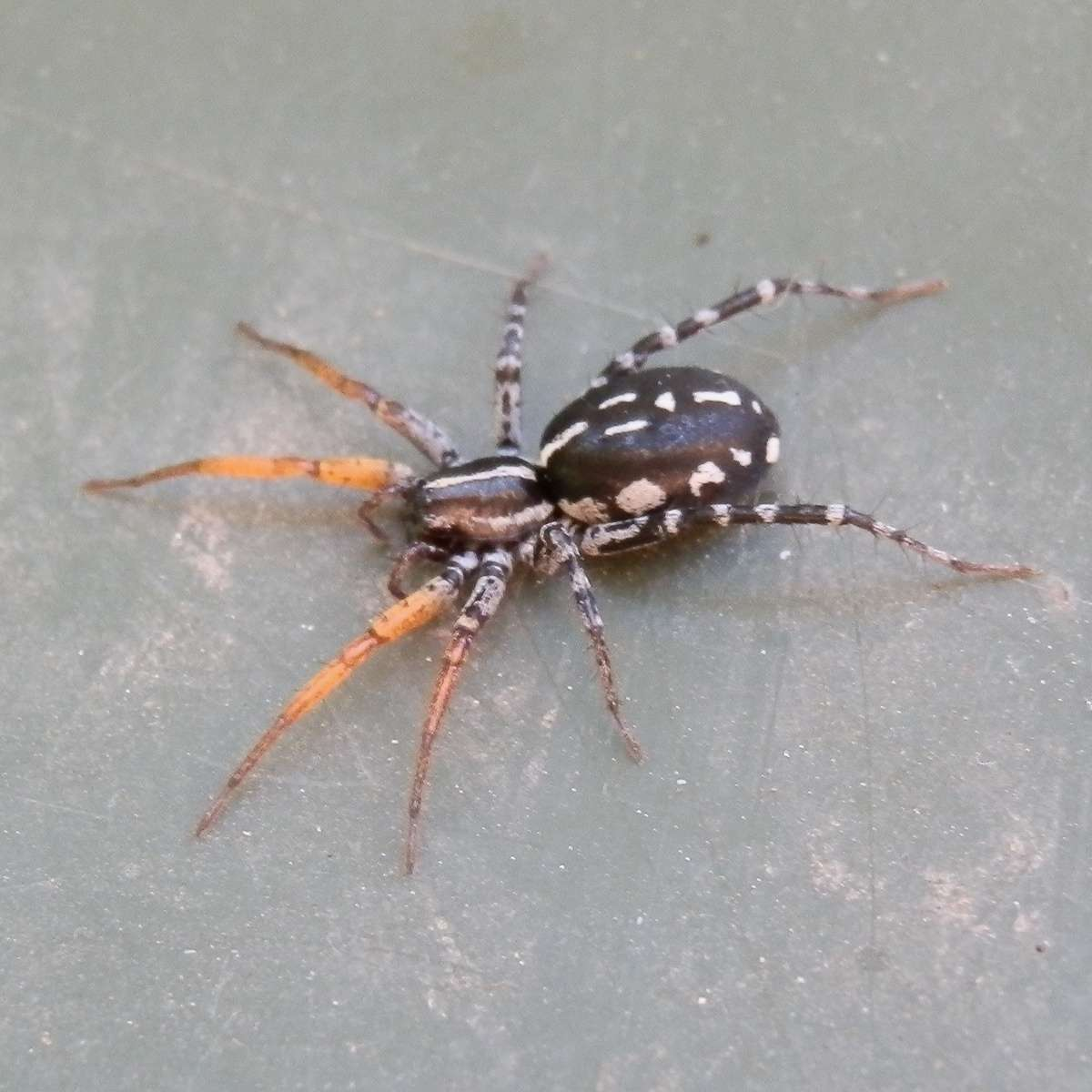
Nyssus coloripes

As of January 2026, this family includes 76 genera and 892 species:

- Abapeba Bonaldo, 2000 – Puerto Rico, St. Vincent, Trinidad, Panama, Mexico, South America
- Aetius O. Pickard-Cambridge, 1897 – Ivory Coast, Asia
- Allomedmassa Dankittipakul & Singtripop, 2014 – China, Malaysia, Thailand, Vietnam
- Apochinomma Pavesi, 1881 – Africa, Asia, Brazil
- Arushina Caporiacco, 1947 – Tanzania
- Attacobius Mello-Leitão, 1925 – Argentina, Brazil
- Austrophaea Lawrence, 1952 – South Africa
- Battalus Karsch, 1878 – Australia
- Brachyphaea Simon, 1895 – East Africa
- Bunyoronius Bonaldo, Ramírez & Haddad, 2022 – Rwanda, Uganda, Central African Republic
- Cambalida Simon, 1909 – Africa, India
- Carteronius Simon, 1896 – Africa
- Castianeira Keyserling, 1879 – Africa, Asia, North America, South America, Portugal, Spain
- Castoponera Deeleman-Reinhold, 2001 – Indonesia, Malaysia
- Coenoptychus Simon, 1885 – Africa, India, Sri Lanka
- Copa Simon, 1886 – Madagascar, South Africa, Sri Lanka, Australia
- Copuetta Haddad, 2013 – Africa
- Corinna C. L. Koch, 1841 – Cameroon, Kenya, Tanzania, Pakistan, North America, South America, New Guinea
- Corinnomma Karsch, 1880 – Africa, Asia, St. Vincent
- Creugas Thorell, 1878 – USA to South America. Introduced to Ascension Island, Japan, Myanmar, Australia, Pacific islands
- Crinopseudoa Jocqué & Bosselaers, 2011 – Guinea, Ivory Coast, Liberia
- Cycais Thorell, 1877 – Japan, Indonesia
- Disnyssus Raven, 2015 – Australia
- Donuea Strand, 1932 – Madagascar, Mauritius
- Echinax Deeleman-Reinhold, 2001 – Africa, Asia
- Ecitocobius Bonaldo & Brescovit, 1998 – Brazil
- Erendira Bonaldo, 2000 – Puerto Rico, St. Vincent, Panama, Venezuela, Lesser Antilles
- Falconina Brignoli, 1985 – Bonaire, Panama, Mexico, South America. Introduced to Cuba, United States
- Fengzhen Lu & Li, 2023 – China
- Fluctus Jin & Zhang, 2020 – China
- Graptartia Simon, 1896 – Africa
- Grismadox Pett, Rubio & Perger, 2022 – Bolivia, Paraguay
- Griswoldella Haddad, 2021 – Madagascar
- Hortipes Bosselaers & Ledoux, 1998 – Africa, Mozambique
- Humua Ono, 1987 – Japan
- Ianduba Bonaldo, 1997 – Argentina, Brazil
- Iridonyssus Raven, 2015 – Australia
- Kolora Raven, 2015 – Australia
- Leichhardteus Raven & Baehr, 2013 – Australia
- Leptopicia Raven, 2015 – Australia
- Mazax O. Pickard-Cambridge, 1898 – North America, South America
- Medmassa Simon, 1887 – Africa, Asia, Australia, Papua New Guinea
- Megalostrata Karsch, 1880 – North America, Colombia
- Melanesotypus Raven, 2015 – Solomon Islands
- Merenius Simon, 1909 – Africa, Yemen
- Messapus Simon, 1898 – Africa
- Methesis Simon, 1896 – South America
- Myrmecium Latreille, 1824 – South America
- Myrmecotypus O. Pickard-Cambridge, 1894 – USA to South America
- Nucastia Raven, 2015 – Australia
- Nyssus Walckenaer, 1805 – Australia, Fiji, Solomon Islands. Introduced to New Zealand
- Olbus Simon, 1880 – Chile
- Ozcopa Raven, 2015 – Australia
- Parachemmis Chickering, 1937 – Panama, Brazil, Colombia, Guyana
- Paradiestus Mello-Leitão, 1915 – Brazil
- Paramedmassa Jin, H. Zhang & F. Zhang, 2019 – China, Laos, Thailand
- Peng Lu & Li, 2023 – China, Malaysia, Myanmar, Sri Lanka
- Poecilipta Simon, 1897 – Australia, New Caledonia
- Pranburia Deeleman-Reinhold, 1993 – China, Southeast Asia
- Procopius Thorell, 1899 – West, Central Africa
- Pronophaea Simon, 1897 – South Africa
- Psellocoptus Simon, 1896 – Venezuela
- Pseudocorinna Simon, 1909 – Africa
- Scorteccia Caporiacco, 1936 – Libya
- Septentrinna Bonaldo, 2000 – Guatemala, Mexico, United States
- Serendib Deeleman-Reinhold, 2001 – China, Southeast Asia
- Simonestus Bonaldo, 2000 – Guatemala, Panama, Mexico, Venezuela
- Sphecotypus O. Pickard-Cambridge, 1895 – Bolivia
- Spinirta Jin & Zhang, 2020 – China
- Stethorrhagus Simon, 1896 – South America
- Tapixaua Bonaldo, 2000 – South America
- Ticopa Raven, 2015 – Australia
- Tupirinna Bonaldo, 2000 – Panama, South America
- Vendaphaea Haddad, 2009 – South Africa
- Wasaka Haddad, 2013 – Cameroon, Eastern Africa
- Xeropigo O. Pickard-Cambridge, 1882 – Trinidad, United States, South America, Caribbean to Brazil, Guiana. Introduced to St. Helena
