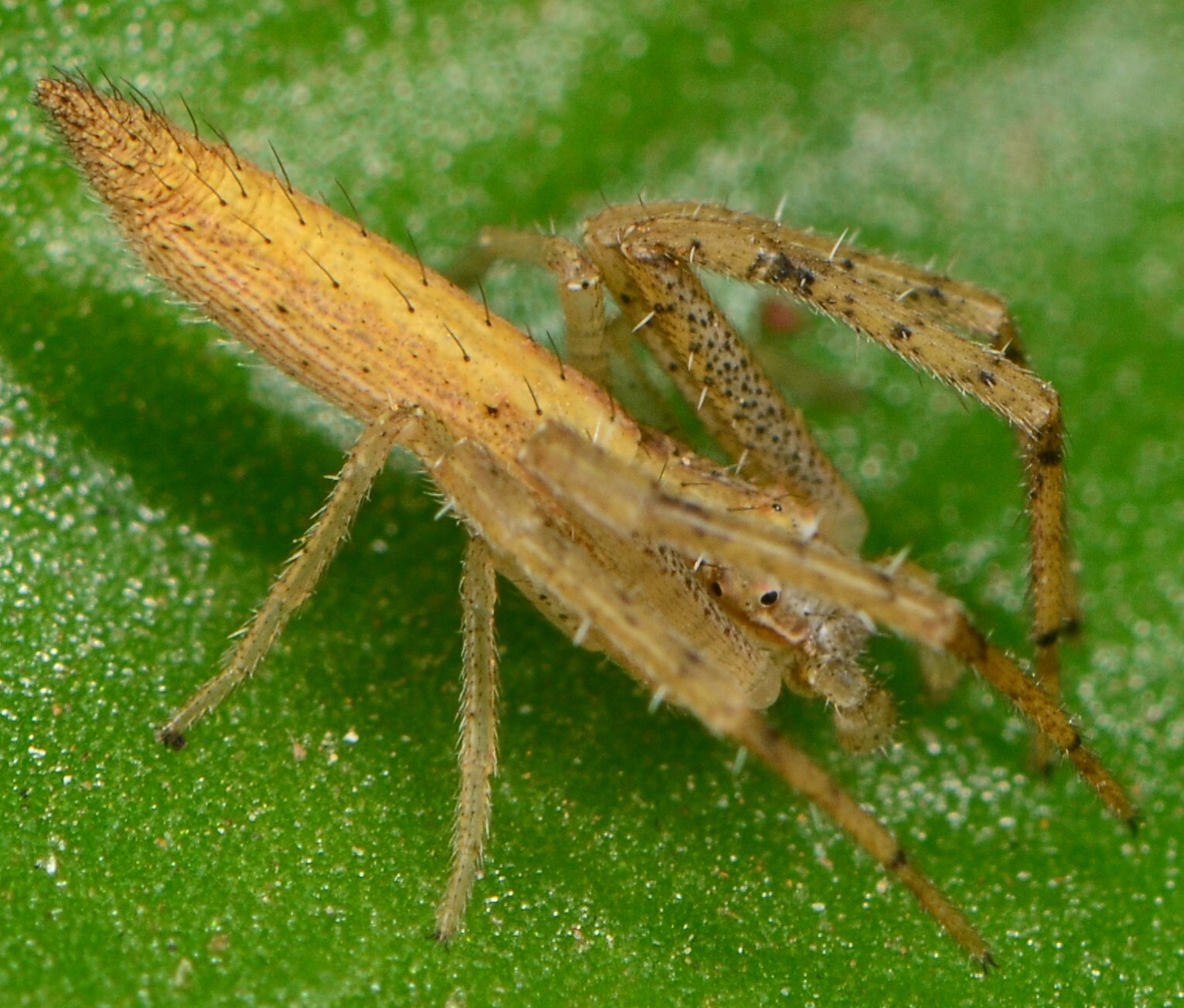
- female
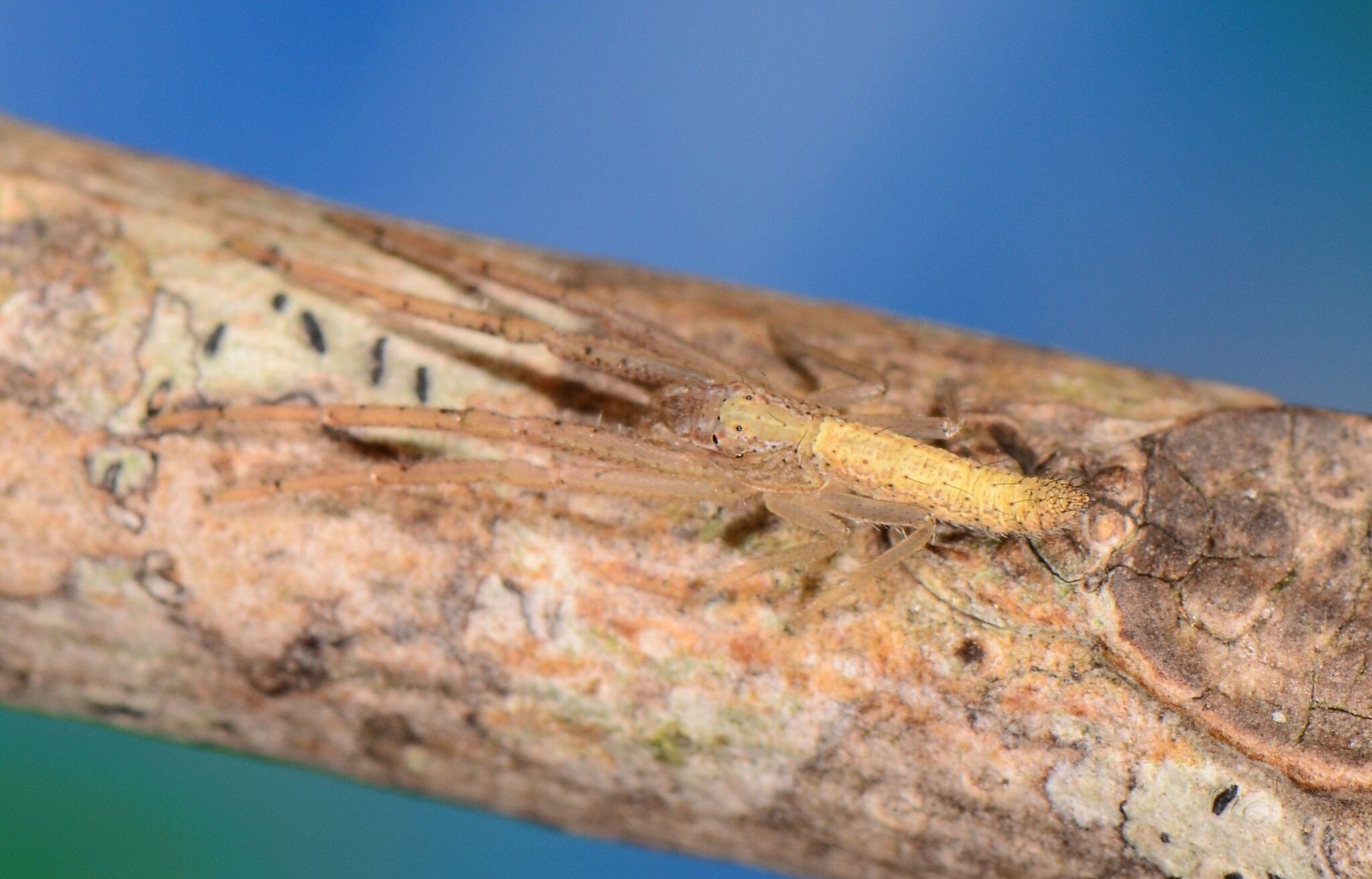
- juvenile female

Scientific classification
- Kingdom: Animalia
- Phylum: Arthropoda
- Subphylum: Chelicerata
- Class: Arachnida
- Order: Araneae
- Infraorder: Araneomorphae
- Family: Thomisidae
- Genus: Monaeses
- Species: M. griseus

Binomial name
- Monaeses griseus Pavesi, 1897

Synonyms
- Monaeses debilispina Lawrence, 1928

= Monaeses griseus =

Species of spider

Monaeses griseus is a species of spider in the family Thomisidae. It is endemic to Africa.

== Distribution ==
Monaeses griseus is found in Ethiopia, Namibia, Somalia, Sudan and South Africa.

In South Africa, the species is known from four provinces. Notable locations include Giant's Castle Game Reserve, Kamberg Nature Reserve, and various locations in the Drakensberg.

== Habitat and ecology ==
Monaeses griseus inhabits grass. The species has been sampled from Forest, Grassland, Savanna and Thicket biomes. It occurs at altitudes ranging from 76 to 1,902 m.

== Description ==
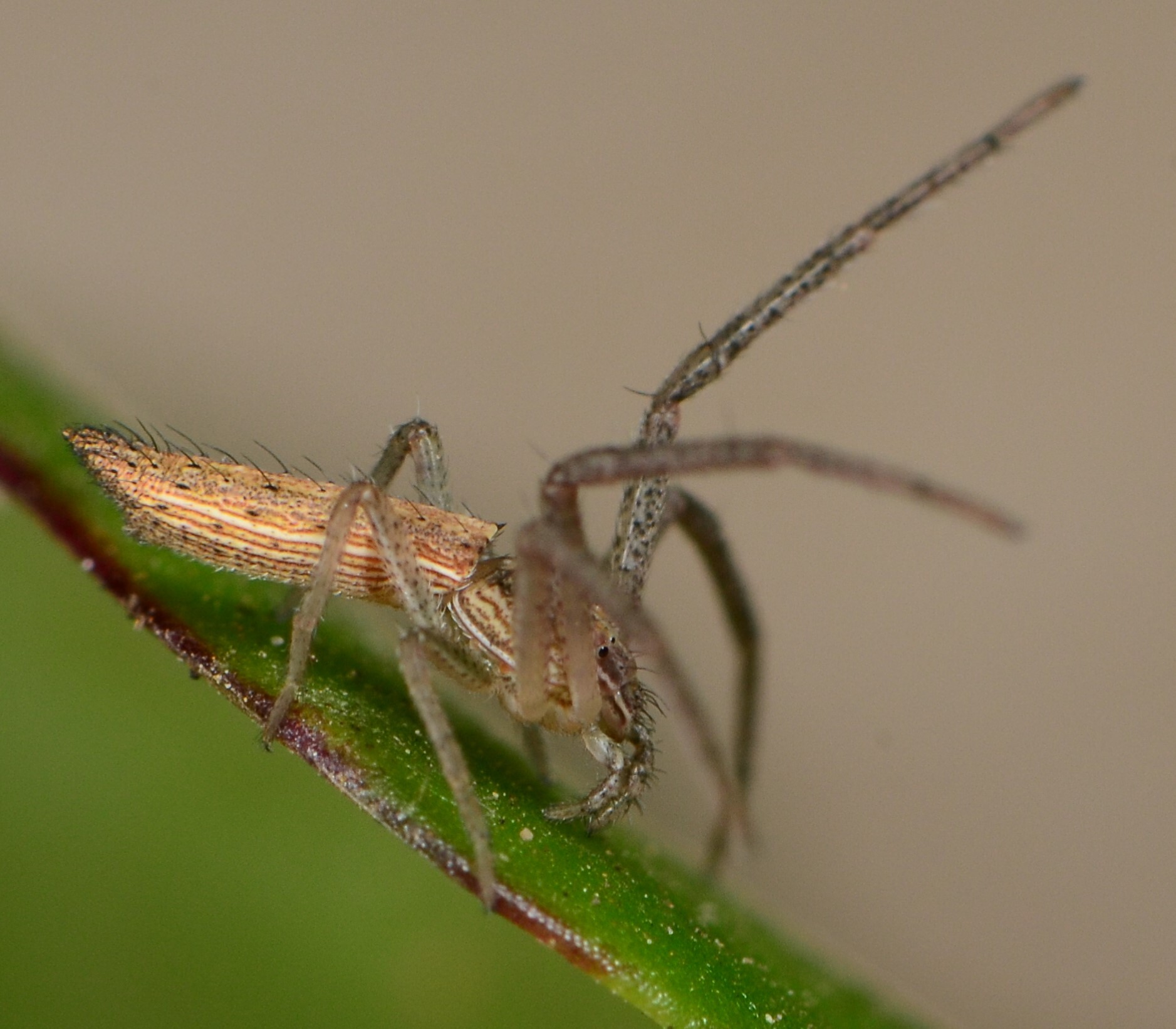
female

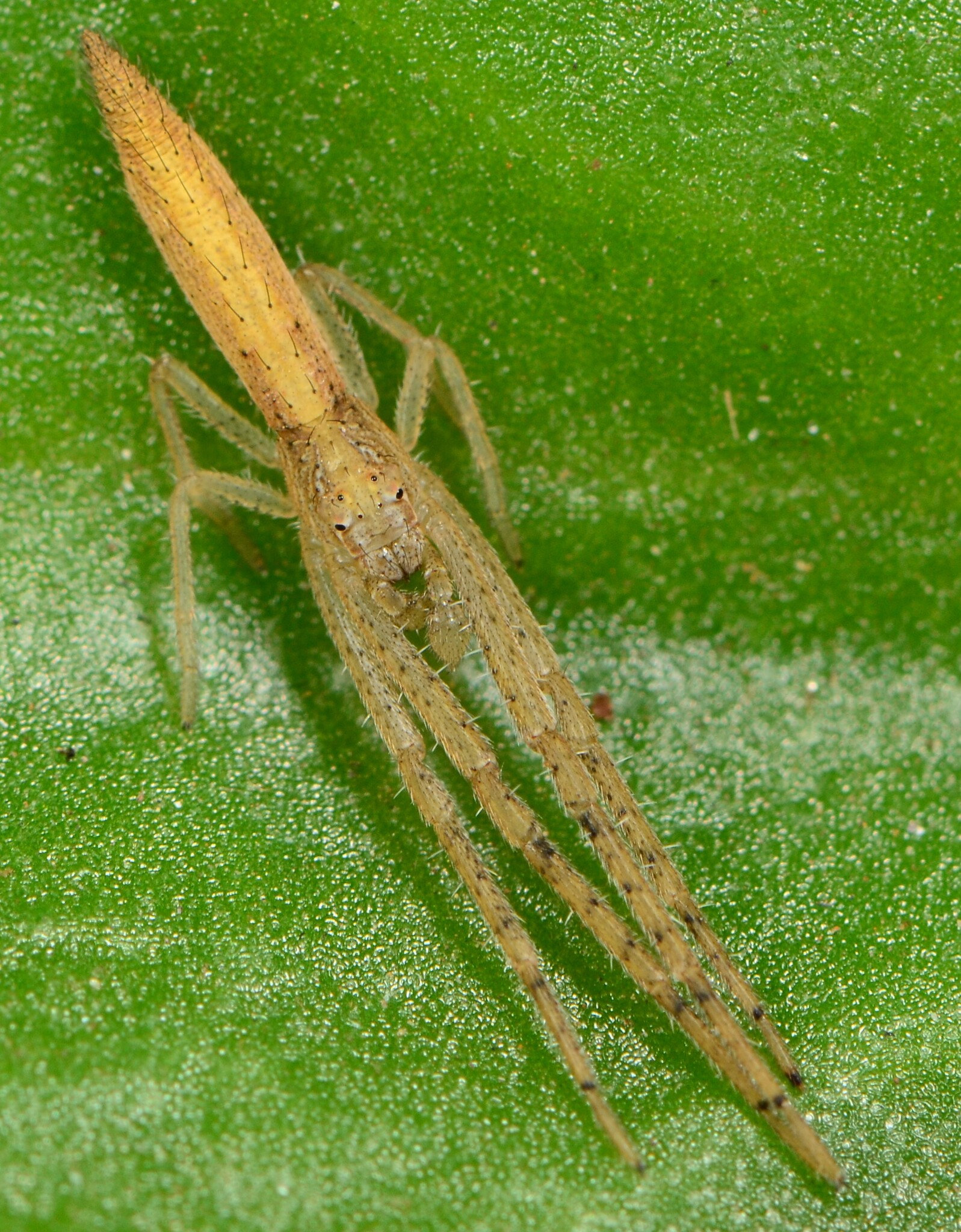
female

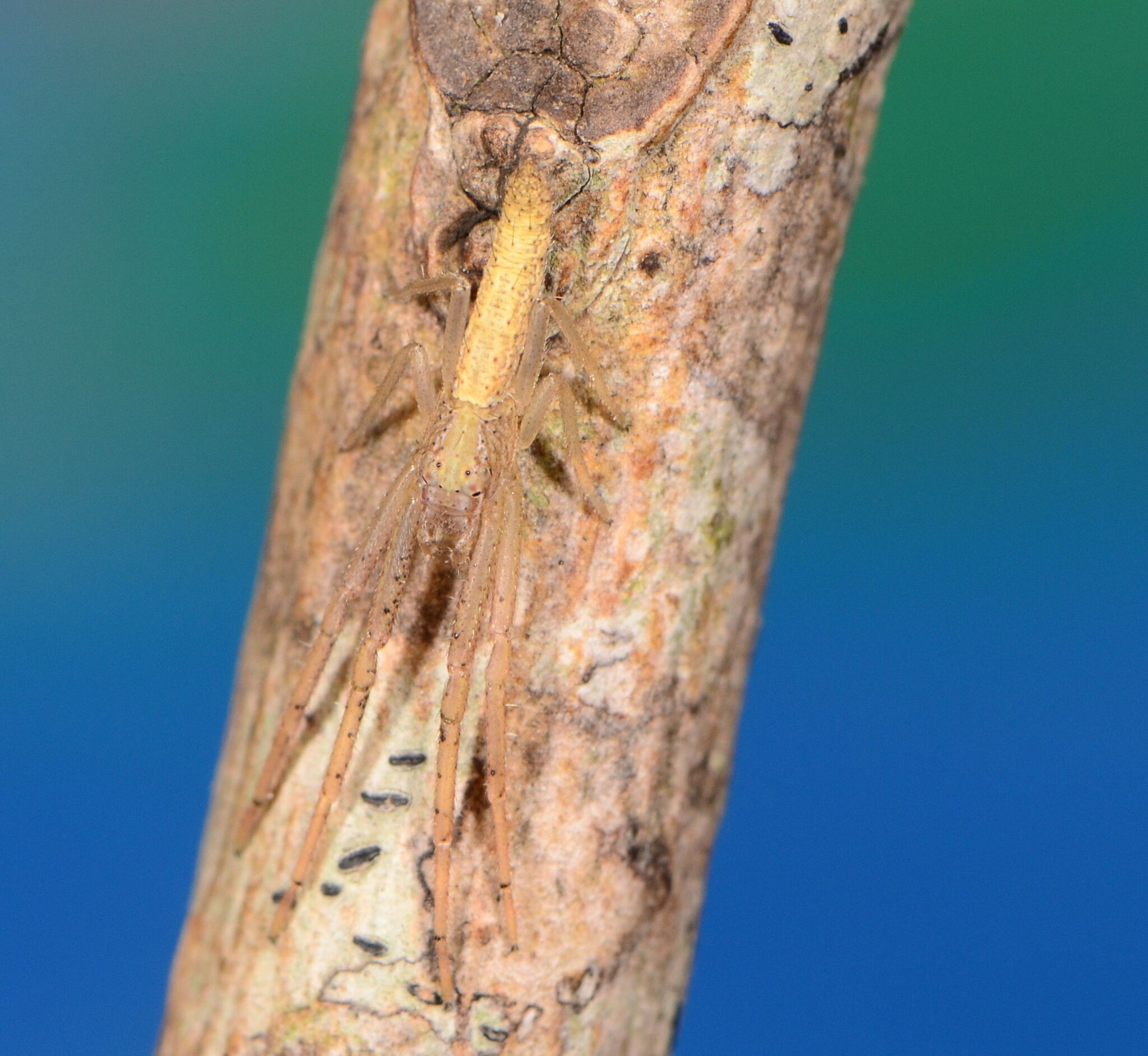
juvenile female

== Conservation ==
Monaeses griseus is listed as Least Concern by the South African National Biodiversity Institute due to its wide geographical range. The species is protected in five protected areas including Lekgalameetse Nature Reserve.

== Taxonomy ==
Monaeses griseus was originally described by Pietro Pavesi in 1897 from Ethiopia. The species was revised by Dippenaar-Schoeman in 1984, who synonymized Monaeses debilispina with this species.
