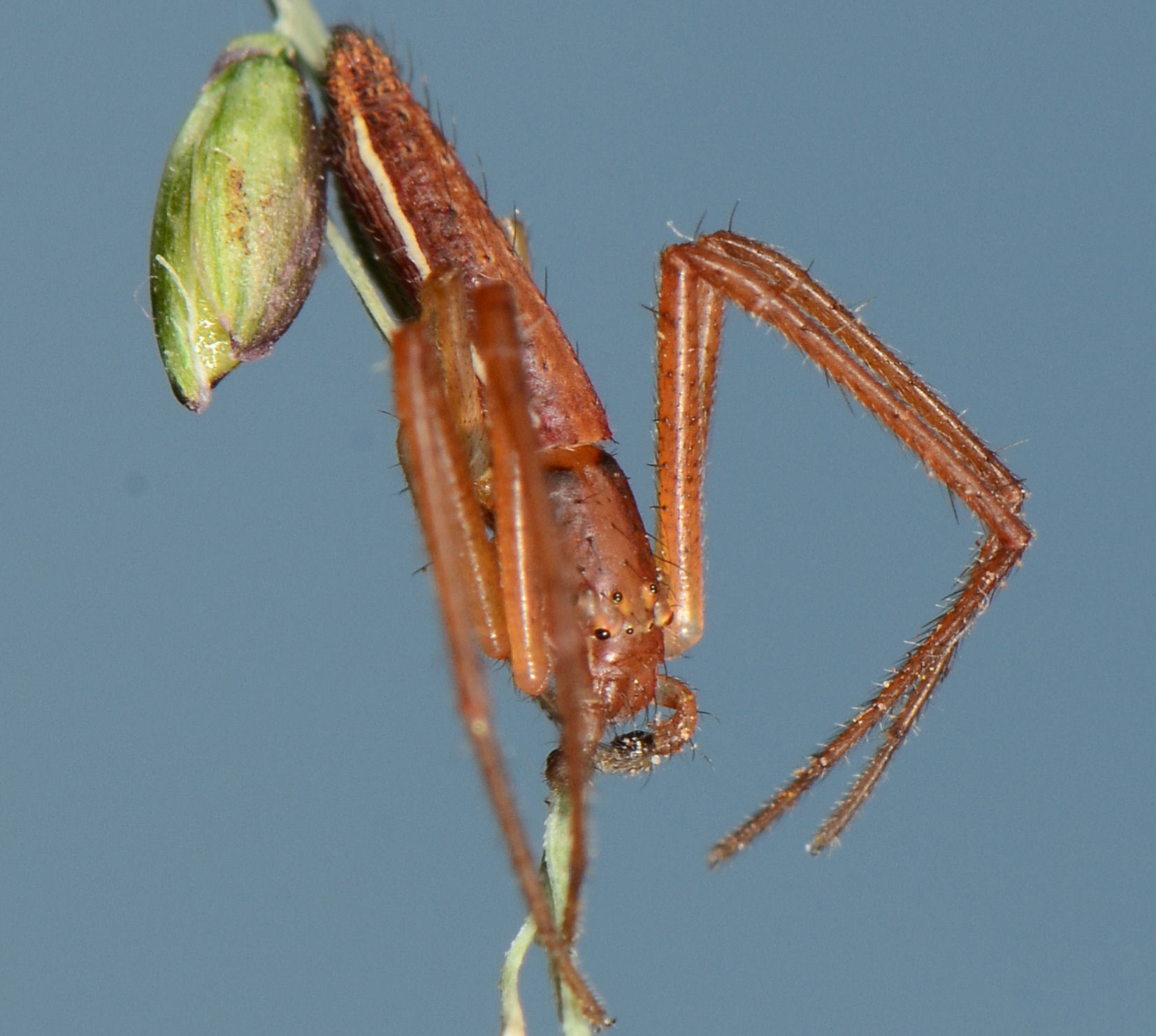
- male
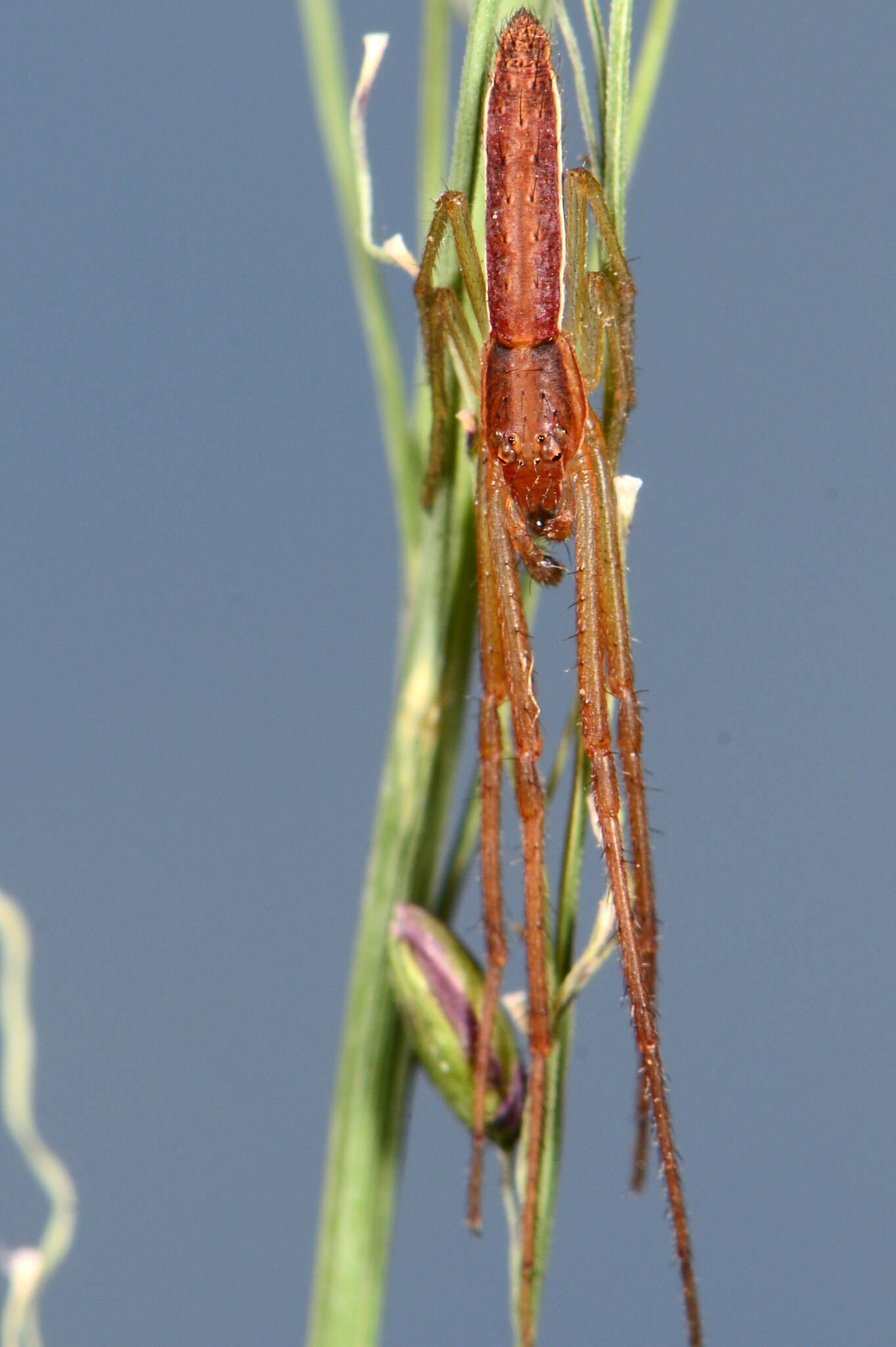
- male

Scientific classification
- Kingdom: Animalia
- Phylum: Arthropoda
- Subphylum: Chelicerata
- Class: Arachnida
- Order: Araneae
- Infraorder: Araneomorphae
- Family: Thomisidae
- Genus: Monaeses
- Species: M. fuscus

Binomial name
- Monaeses fuscus Dippenaar-Schoeman, 1984

= Monaeses fuscus =

Brown Monaeses Crab Spider

Species of spider

Monaeses fuscus is a species of spider in the family Thomisidae. It is endemic to South Africa and is commonly known as the brown Monaeses crab spider.

== Distribution ==
Monaeses fuscus is found only in South Africa, where it has been sampled from five provinces. Notable locations include Polokwane Nature Reserve, Giant's Castle Game Reserve, Hluhluwe-iMfolozi Park, and iSimangaliso Wetland Park.

== Habitat and ecology ==
Monaeses fuscus is mainly sampled from grass in Forest, Indian Ocean Coastal Belt, Savanna and Grassland biomes at altitudes ranging from 45 to 1,842 m.

The species has also been sampled from crops such as cotton and potato plants.

== Conservation ==
Monaeses fuscus is listed as Least Concern by the South African National Biodiversity Institute due to its wide geographical range. It is protected in six reserves including Polokwane Nature Reserve and Lekgalameetse Nature Reserve.
