= Monaeses cinerascens =

Scientific classification
- Kingdom: Animalia
- Phylum: Arthropoda
- Subphylum: Chelicerata
- Class: Arachnida
- Order: Araneae
- Infraorder: Araneomorphae
- Family: Thomisidae
- Genus: Monaeses
- Species: M. cinerascens

Binomial name
- Monaeses cinerascens (Thorell, 1887)

Synonyms
- Rhynchognatha cinerascens Thorell, 1887

Species of spider

Monaeses cinerascens, is a species of spider of the genus Monaeses. It is found only in Myanmar and Sri Lanka.

== See also ==
- List of Thomisidae species
