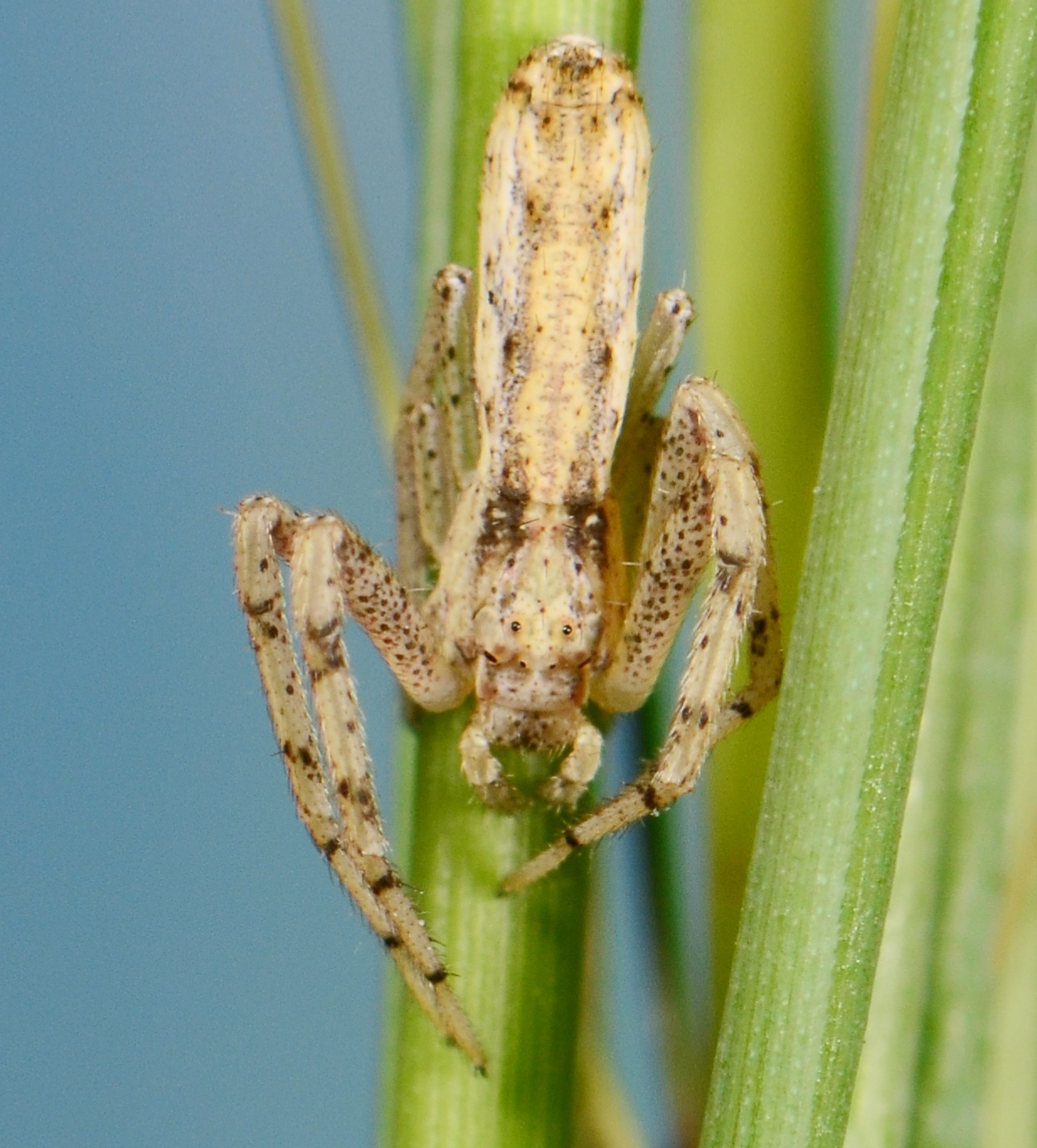
- female

Scientific classification
- Kingdom: Animalia
- Phylum: Arthropoda
- Subphylum: Chelicerata
- Class: Arachnida
- Order: Araneae
- Infraorder: Araneomorphae
- Family: Thomisidae
- Genus: Monaeses
- Species: M. gibbus

Binomial name
- Monaeses gibbus Dippenaar-Schoeman, 1984

= Monaeses gibbus =

Short Tail Monaeses Crab Spider

Species of spider

Monaeses gibbus is a species of spider in the family Thomisidae. It is endemic to South Africa and is commonly known as the short tail Monaeses crab spider.

== Distribution ==
Monaeses gibbus is found in South Africa, where it is known from five provinces. Notable locations include Hluhluwe-iMfolozi Park, iSimangaliso Wetland Park, Kruger National Park, and Nylsvley Nature Reserve.

== Habitat and ecology ==
Monaeses gibbus is mainly sampled from grass in Savanna, Indian Ocean Coastal Belt and Grassland biomes. The species occurs at altitudes ranging from 29 to 1,332 m.

Females have been collected in March and April, while males have been collected in January and December.

== Description ==
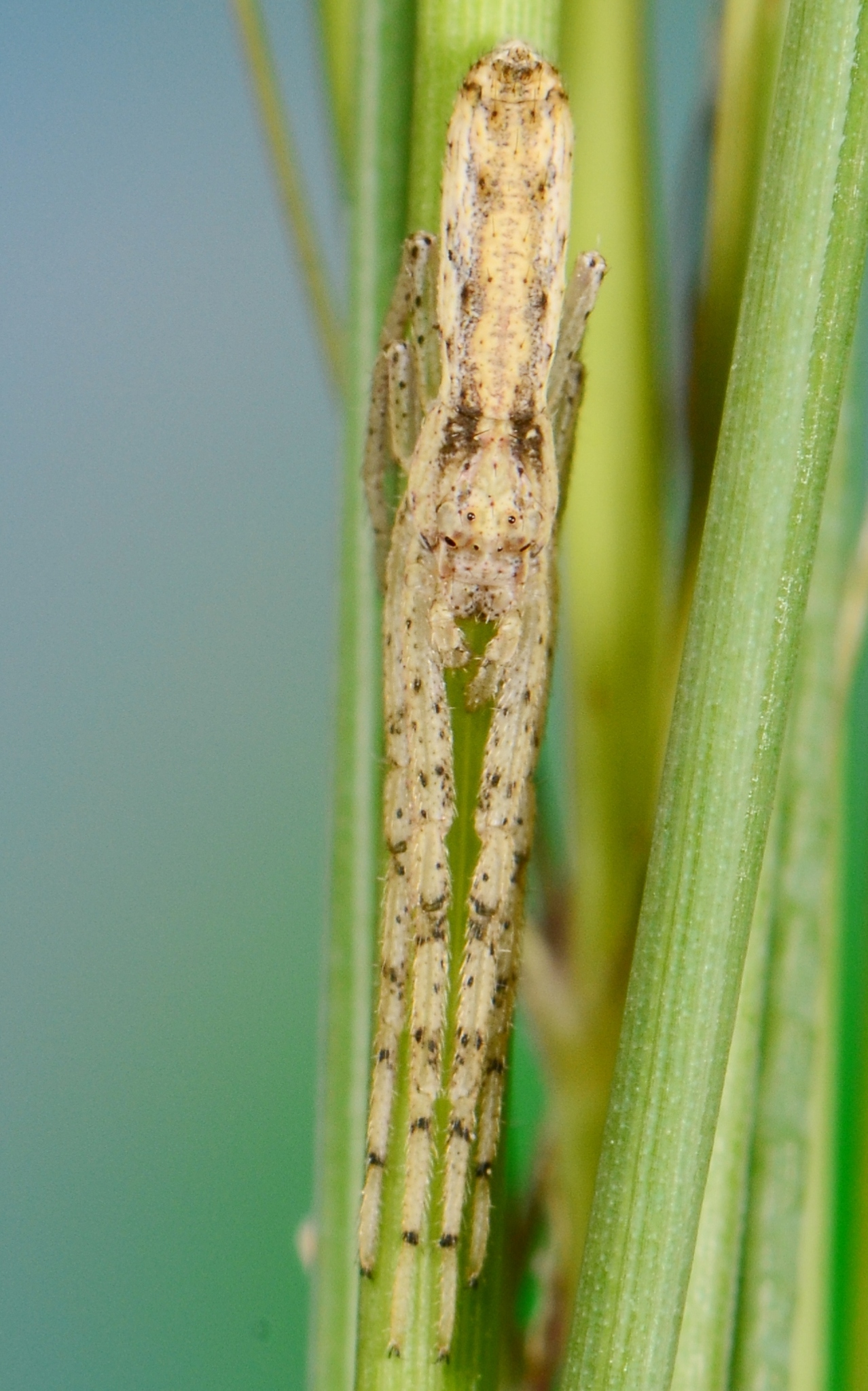

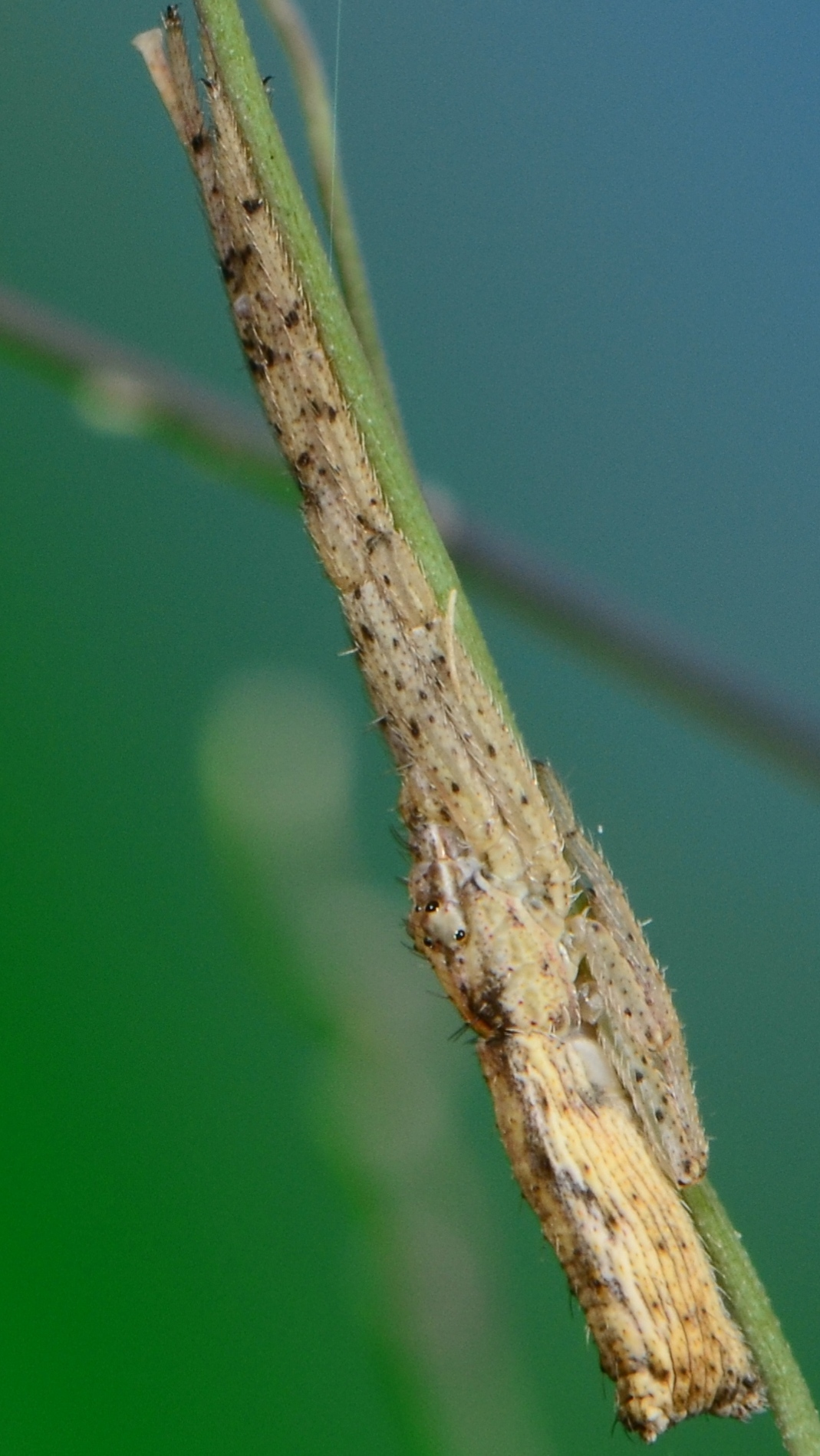

== Conservation ==
Monaeses gibbus is listed as Least Concern by the South African National Biodiversity Institute due to its wide geographical range. The species is protected in nine protected areas including Nylsvley Nature Reserve, Polokwane Nature Reserve and Kruger National Park.
