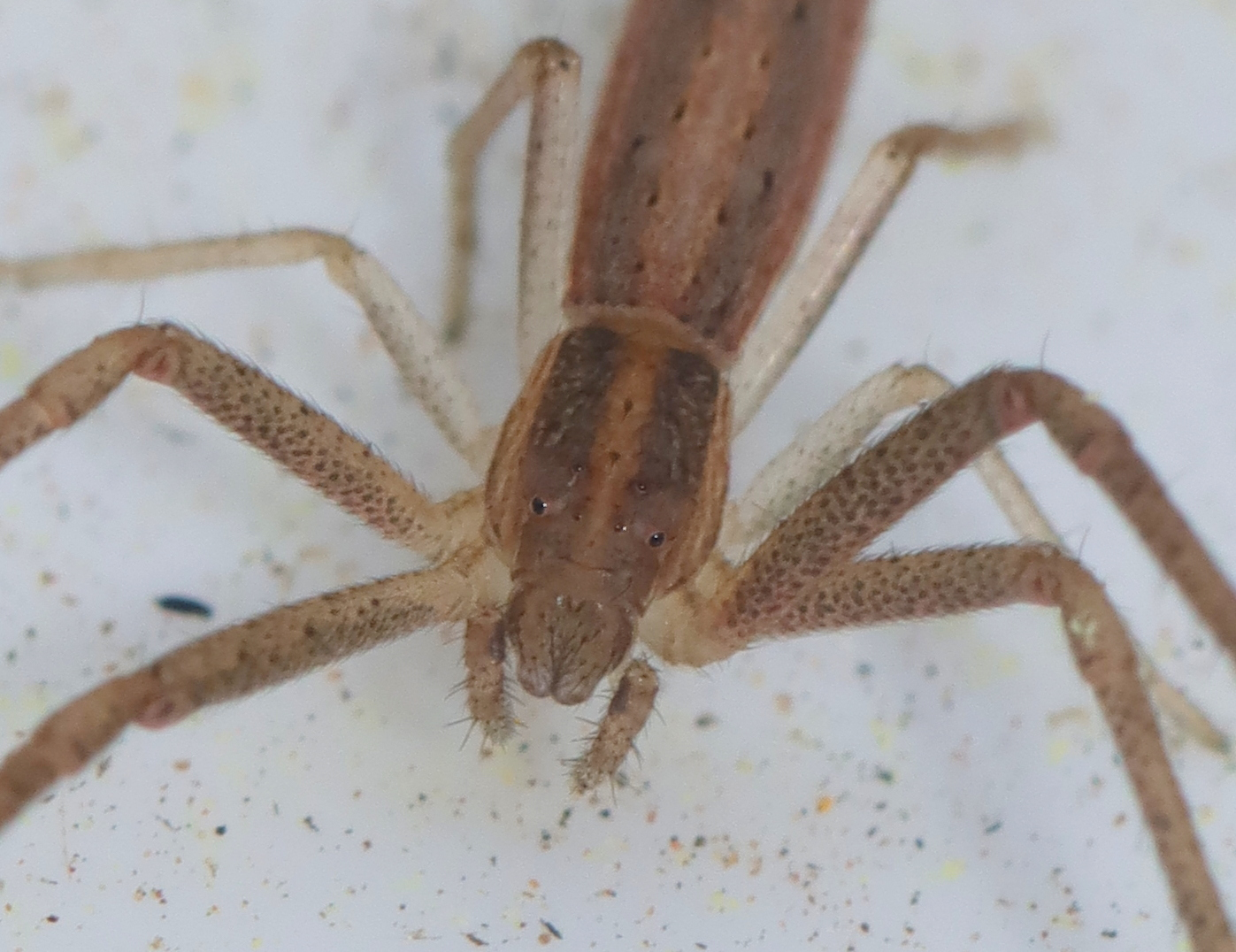

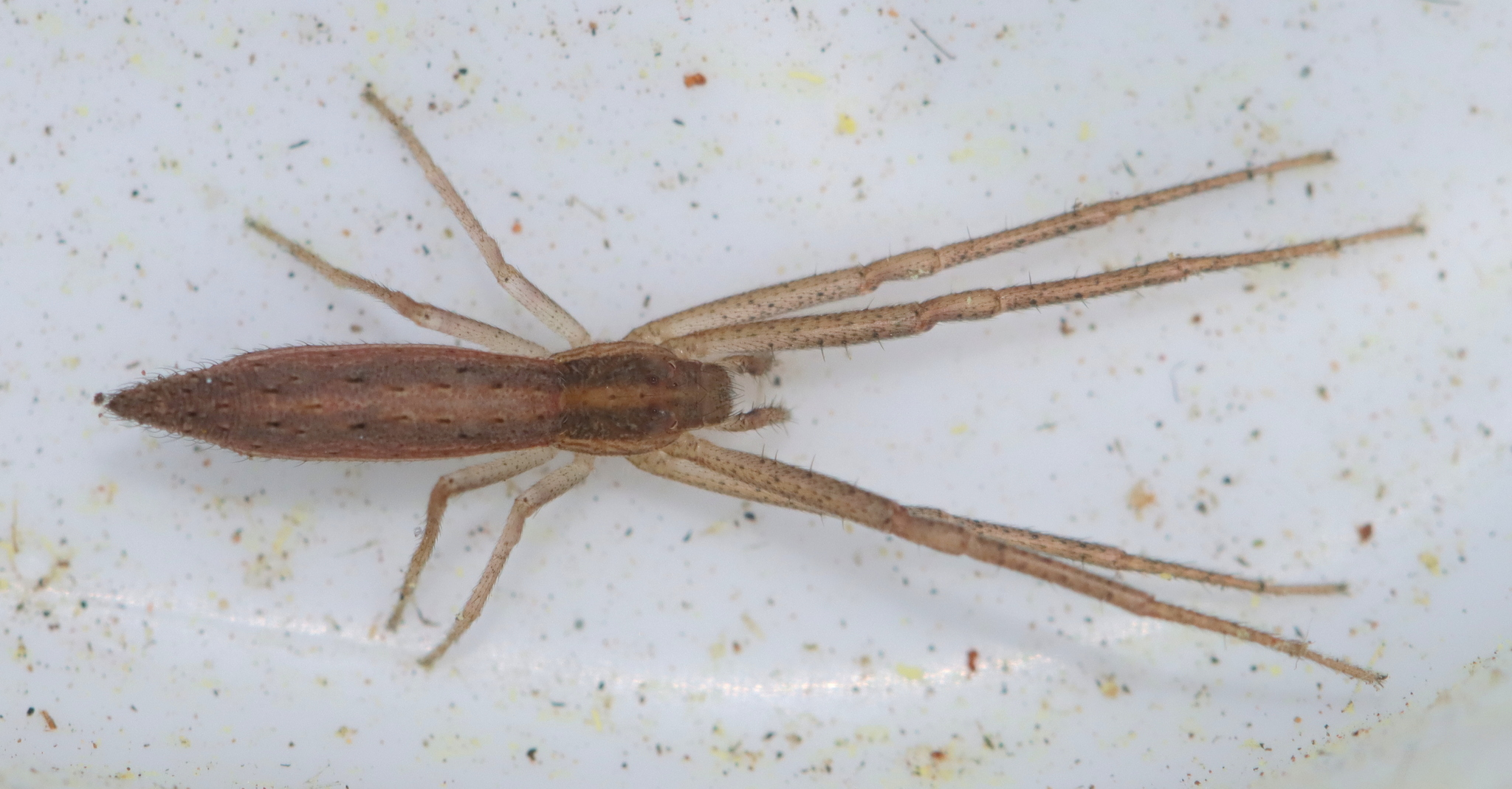

Scientific classification
- Kingdom: Animalia
- Phylum: Arthropoda
- Subphylum: Chelicerata
- Class: Arachnida
- Order: Araneae
- Infraorder: Araneomorphae
- Family: Thomisidae
- Genus: Monaeses
- Species: M. pustulosus

Binomial name
- Monaeses pustulosus Pavesi, 1895

Synonyms
- Tmarus pustulosus Simon, 1901

= Monaeses pustulosus =

Long Tail Monaeses Crab Spider

Species of spider

Monaeses pustulosus is a species of spider in the family Thomisidae. It is endemic to Africa and is commonly known as the long tail Monaeses crab spider.

== Distribution ==
Monaeses pustulosus is found in Ethiopia, Guinea, Burkina Faso, Tanzania, Eritrea, Zimbabwe, Kenya, DR Congo, Namibia and South Africa.

In South Africa, the species occurs in all nine provinces. Notable locations include Golden Gate Highlands National Park, Kruger National Park, iSimangaliso Wetland Park, and Suikerbosrand Nature Reserve.

== Habitat and ecology ==
Monaeses pustulosus is mainly sampled from grass. The species has been collected from Fynbos, Forest, Indian Ocean Coastal Belt, Nama Karoo, Savanna and Grassland biomes at altitudes ranging from 1 to 2,020 m.

Some individuals have also been collected from trees such as Dombeya species at Nylsvley Nature Reserve.

== Conservation ==
Monaeses pustulosus is listed as Least Concern by the South African National Biodiversity Institute due to its wide geographical range. The species is protected in 14 protected areas.

== Taxonomy ==
Monaeses pustulosus was originally described by Pietro Pavesi in 1895 from Ethiopia. The species was revised by Dippenaar-Schoeman in 1984.
