= Giants Challenge =

The Giants Challenge is a one-day mountain-bike marathon held in April in the Giant's Castle area of the Drakensberg Mountains in South Africa.
