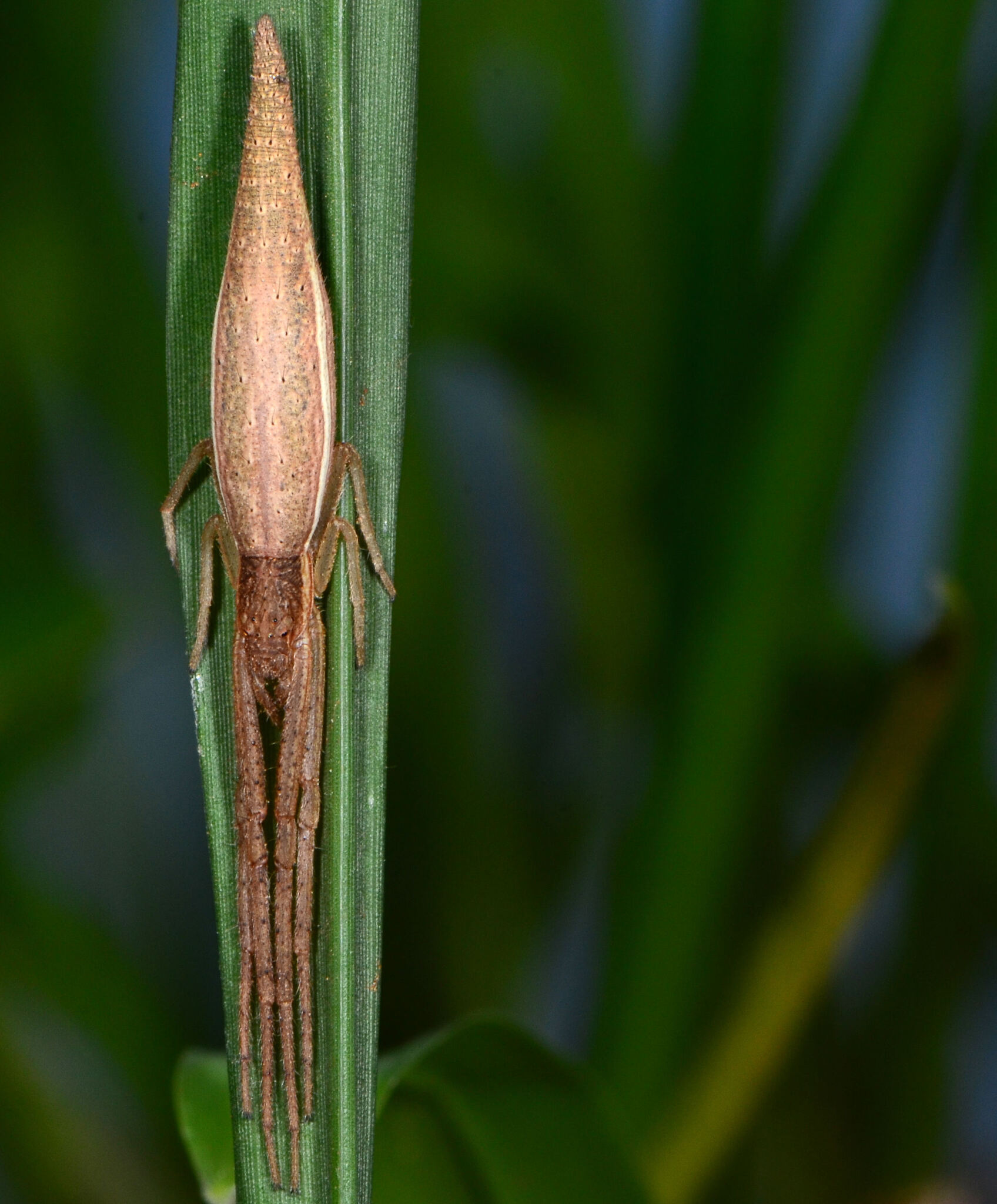
- female
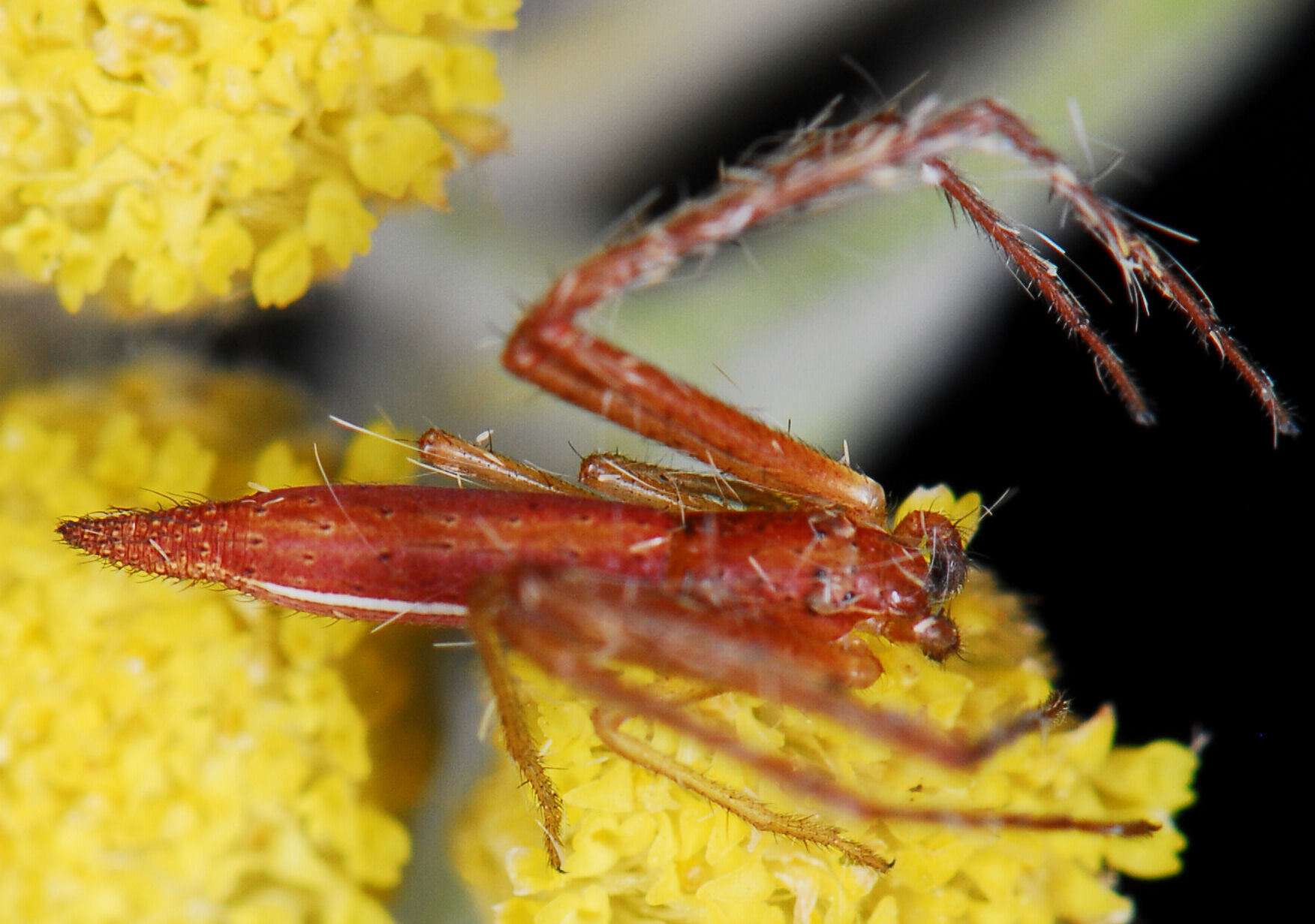
- male

Scientific classification
- Kingdom: Animalia
- Phylum: Arthropoda
- Subphylum: Chelicerata
- Class: Arachnida
- Order: Araneae
- Infraorder: Araneomorphae
- Family: Thomisidae
- Genus: Monaeses
- Species: M. austrinus

Binomial name
- Monaeses austrinus Simon, 1910

Synonyms
- Monaeses magnus Millot, 1942; Monaeses voltaensis Millot, 1942

= Monaeses austrinus =

White Band Monaeses Crab Spider

Species of spider

Monaeses austrinus is a species of spider in the family Thomisidae. It is endemic to Africa and is commonly known as the white band Monaeses crab spider.

== Distribution ==
Monaeses austrinus is found in Botswana, Ivory Coast, Namibia, Zimbabwe, South Africa and Eswatini.

In South Africa, the species occurs in all nine provinces including more than 20 protected areas. Notable locations include Golden Gate Highlands National Park, Kruger National Park, iSimangaliso Wetland Park, and Pilanesberg National Park.

== Habitat and ecology ==
Monaeses austrinus inhabits grass and low vegetation and is easily collected with a sweepnet. The species is abundant in Forest, Indian Ocean Coastal Belt, Nama Karoo, Grassland, Thicket and Savanna biomes at altitudes ranging from 1 to 2,253 m.

The species has also been sampled from cotton and pistachio plantations.

Females have been collected in January, February, April and May, while males have been collected from November to April, mainly from grass.

== Description ==
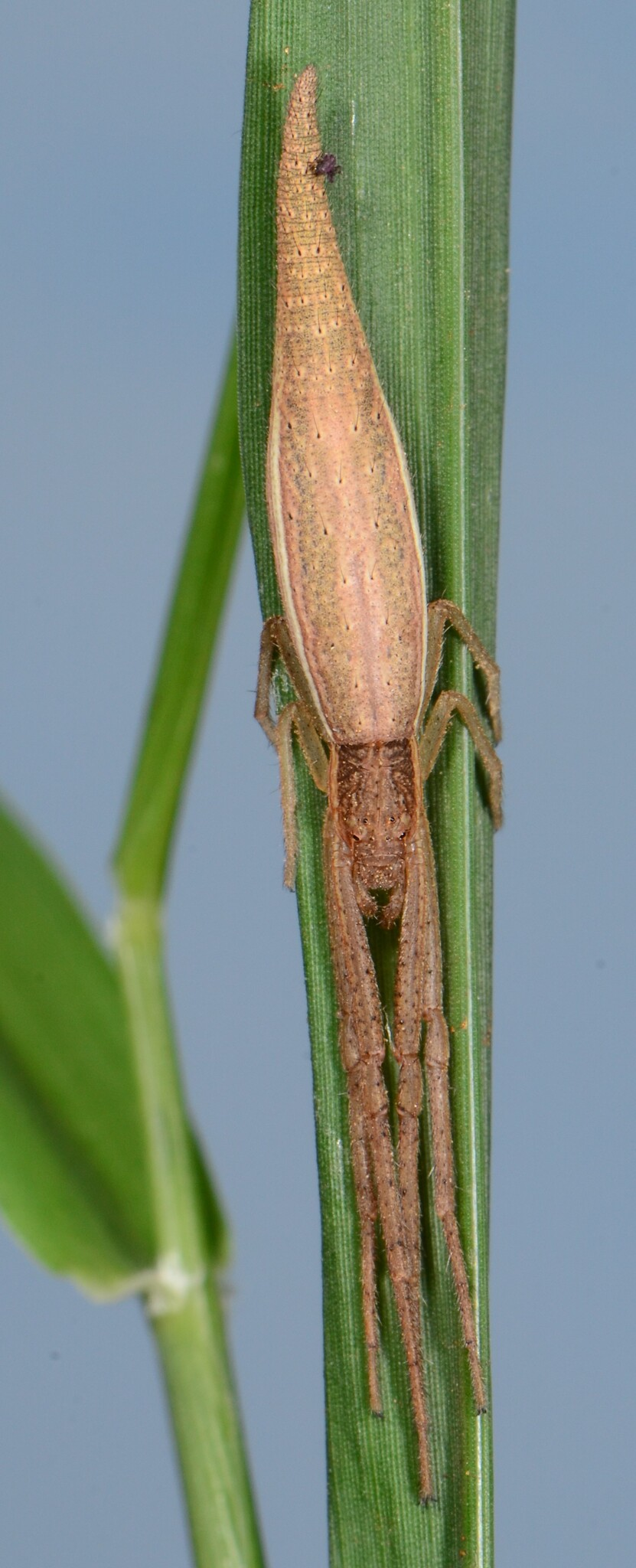
female

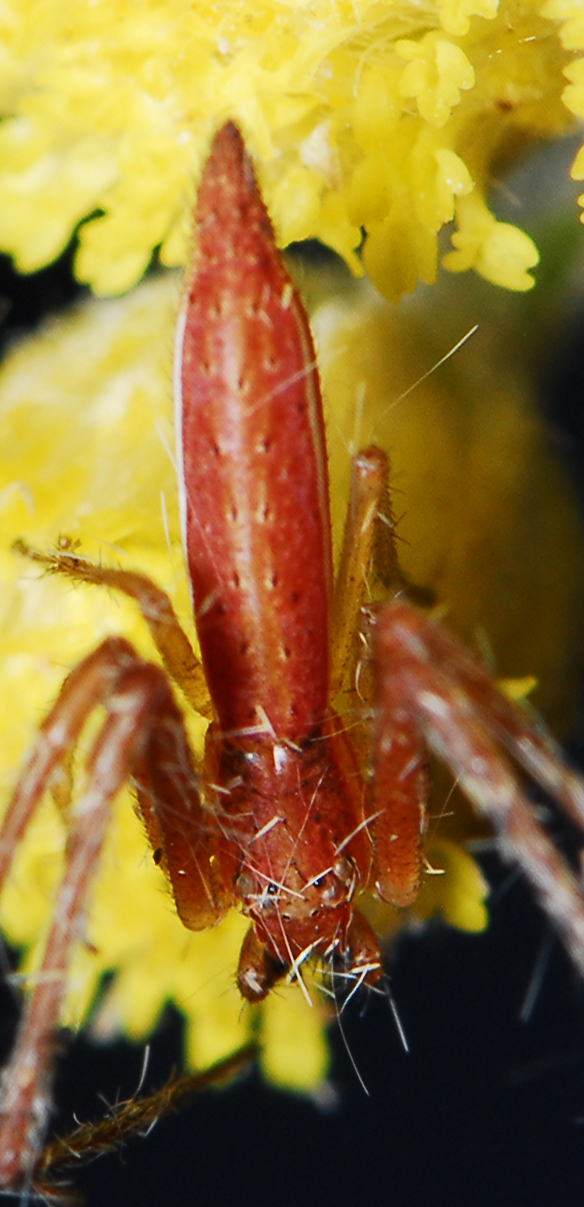
male

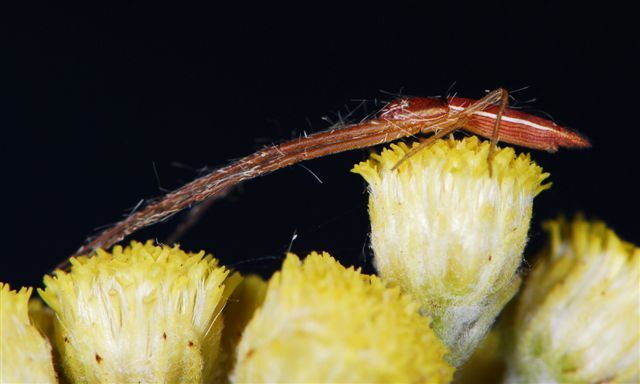
male

== Conservation ==
Monaeses austrinus is listed as Least Concern by the South African National Biodiversity Institute due to its wide geographical range. The species is protected in more than 20 protected areas.

== Taxonomy ==
Monaeses austrinus was originally described by Eugène Simon in 1910 with the type locality given only as South Africa. The species was revised by Dippenaar-Schoeman in 1984, who synonymized Monaeses magnus and M. voltaensis with this species.
