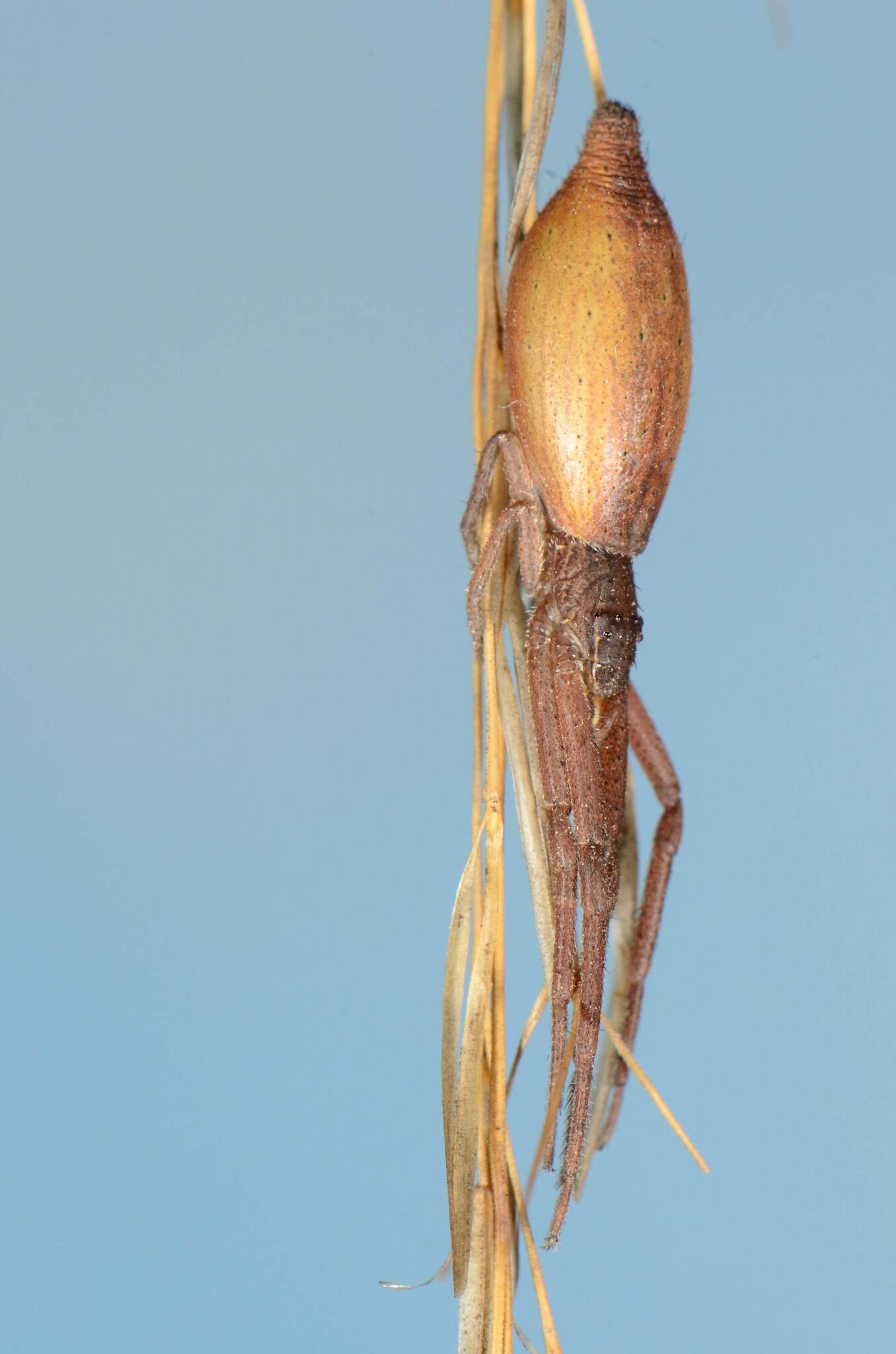
- female

Scientific classification
- Kingdom: Animalia
- Phylum: Arthropoda
- Subphylum: Chelicerata
- Class: Arachnida
- Order: Araneae
- Infraorder: Araneomorphae
- Family: Thomisidae
- Genus: Monaeses
- Species: M. paradoxus

Binomial name
- Monaeses paradoxus (Lucas, 1846)

Synonyms
- Monastes paradoxus Lucas, 1846; Monaeses caudicula Simon, 1885; Monaeses paradoxus albidus Simon, 1906; Monaeses nigeriensis Millot, 1942

= Monaeses paradoxus =

Spotted Monaeses Crab Spider

Species of spider

Monaeses paradoxus is a species of spider in the family Thomisidae. It has a very wide distribution and is commonly known as the spotted Monaeses crab spider.

== Distribution ==
Monaeses paradoxus is found from Southern Europe to Iran, and throughout Africa.

In South Africa, the species occurs in all nine provinces. Notable locations include Kruger National Park, Tsitsikamma National Park, Pilanesberg National Park, and Suikerbosrand Nature Reserve.

== Habitat and ecology ==
Monaeses paradoxus inhabits grass and low vegetation and is easily collected with a sweepnet.

The species is abundant in Fynbos, Forest, Indian Ocean Coastal Belt, Nama Karoo, Succulent Karoo, Grassland and Savanna biomes at altitudes ranging from 1 to 1,871 m.

The species has also been sampled from cotton and pistachio orchards.

Adults have been collected throughout the year, except during winter months.

== Description ==
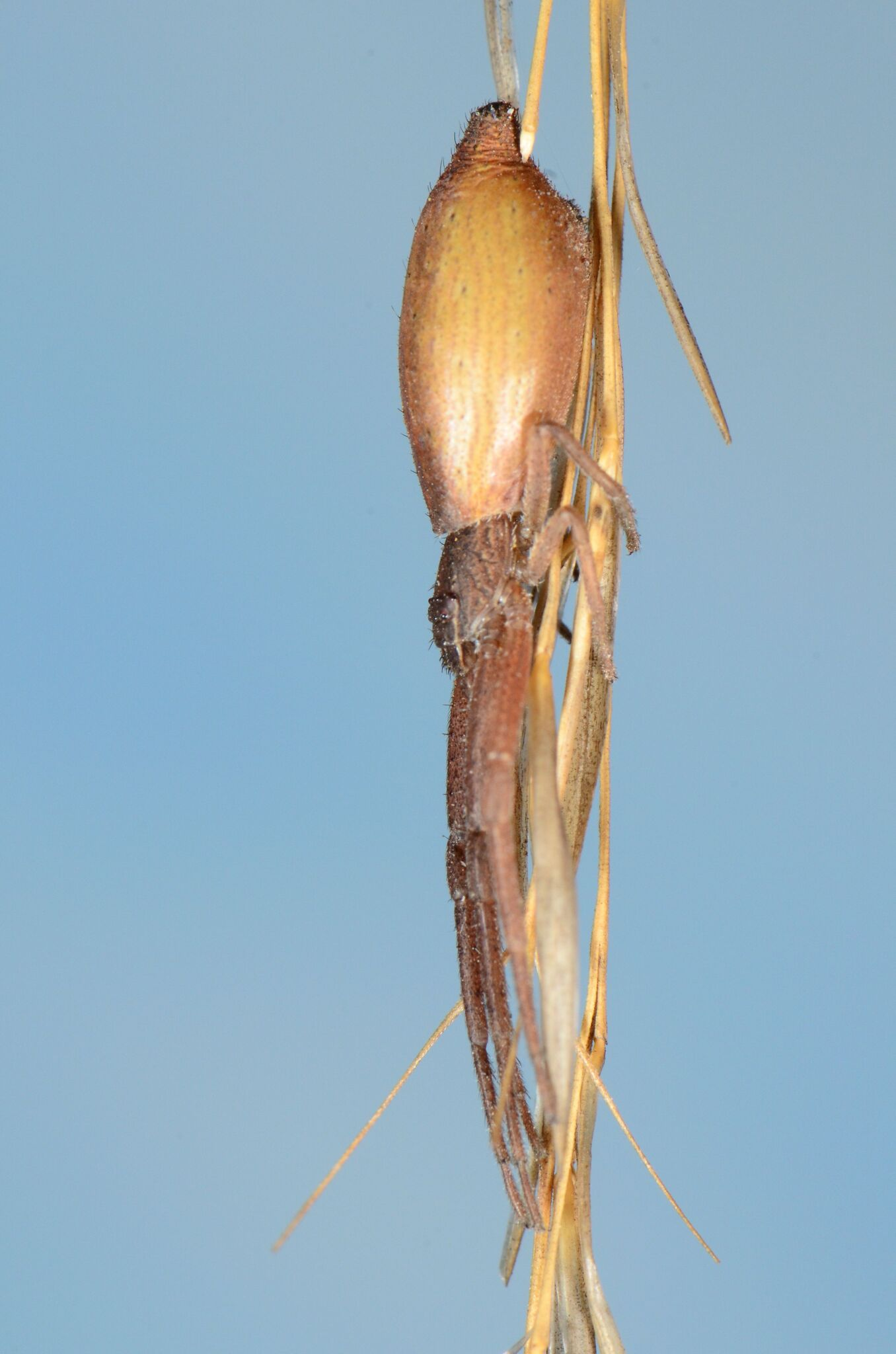
female

== Conservation ==
Monaeses paradoxus is listed as Least Concern by the South African National Biodiversity Institute due to its wide global range. The species is protected in more than 19 reserves.

== Taxonomy ==
Monaeses paradoxus was originally described as Monastes paradoxus by Hippolyte Lucas in 1846 from Algeria. The species was revised by Dippenaar-Schoeman in 1984, who synonymized Monaeses nigeriensis and M. paradoxus albidus with this species.
