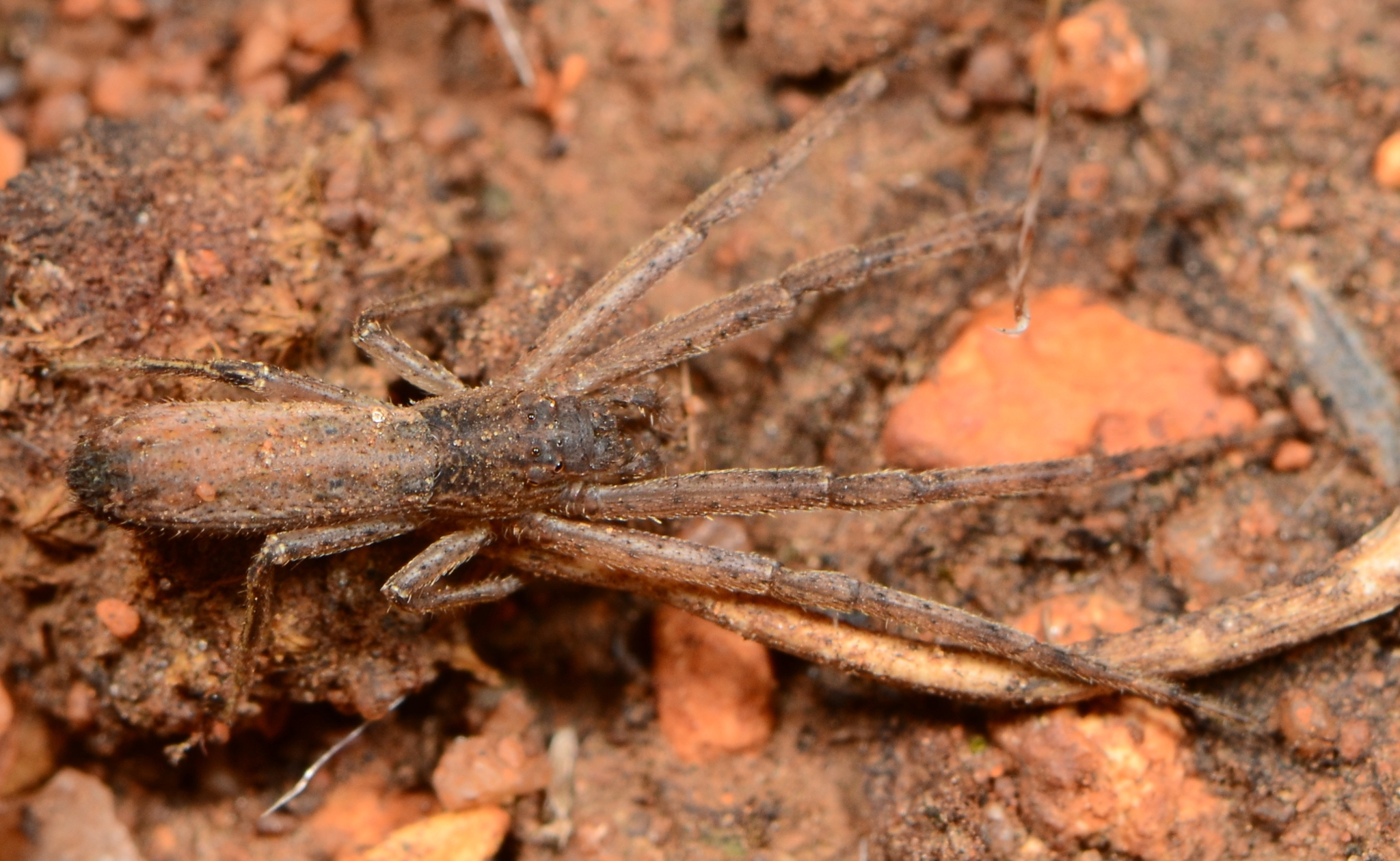
- male
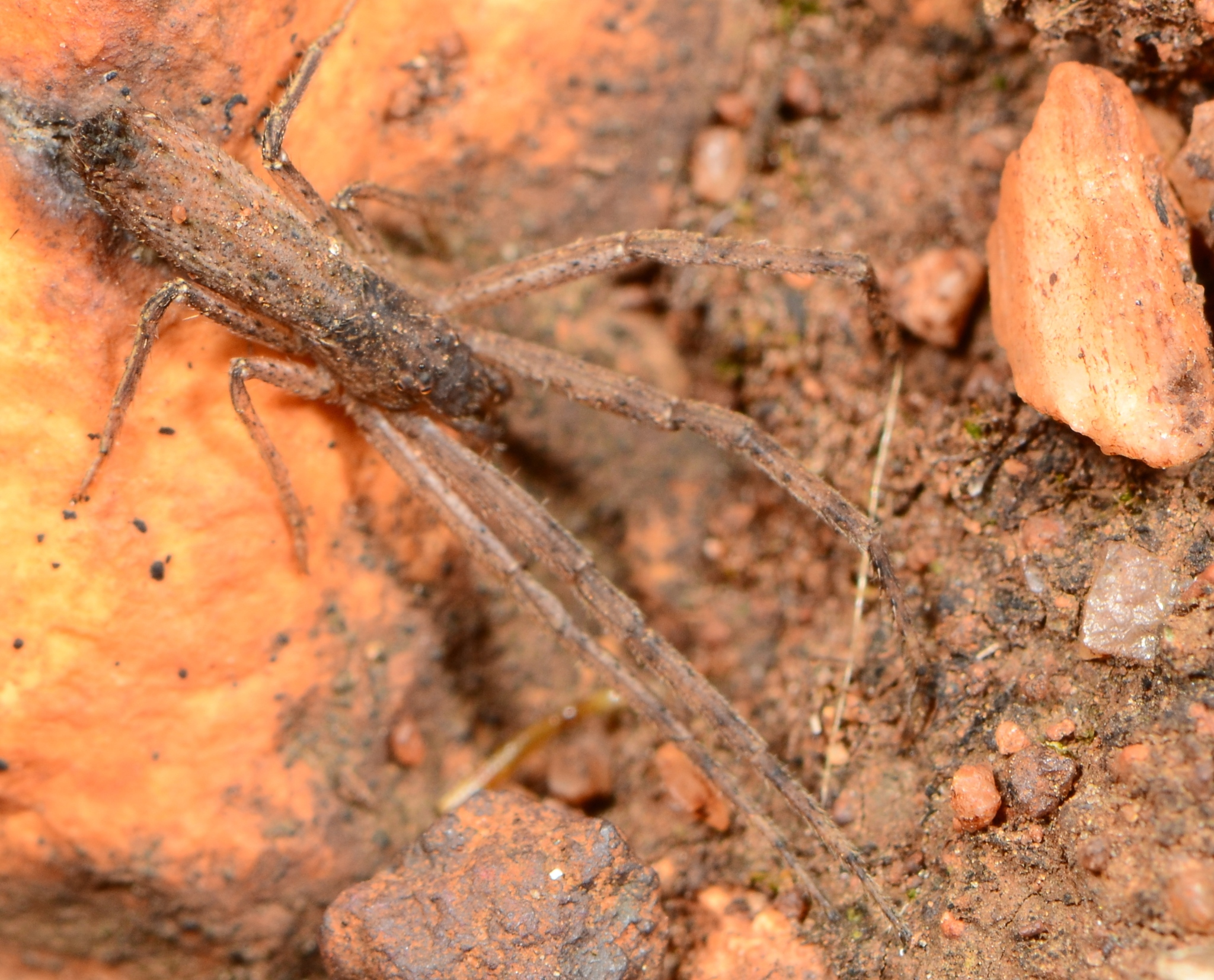
- male

Scientific classification
- Kingdom: Animalia
- Phylum: Arthropoda
- Subphylum: Chelicerata
- Class: Arachnida
- Order: Araneae
- Infraorder: Araneomorphae
- Family: Thomisidae
- Genus: Monaeses
- Species: M. quadrituberculatus

Binomial name
- Monaeses quadrituberculatus Lawrence, 1927

= Monaeses quadrituberculatus =

Round Tail Monaeses Crab Spider

Species of spider

Monaeses quadrituberculatus is a species of spider in the family Thomisidae. It is endemic to Africa and is commonly known as the round tail Monaeses crab spider.

== Distribution ==
Monaeses quadrituberculatus is found in Tanzania, Namibia, Botswana and South Africa.

In South Africa, the species is known from eight provinces. Notable locations include Golden Gate Highlands National Park, Addo Elephant National Park, Hluhluwe-iMfolozi Park, and Richtersveld National Park.

== Habitat and ecology ==
Monaeses quadrituberculatus is mainly sampled from grass. The species has been collected from Desert, Forest, Indian Ocean Coastal Belt, Nama Karoo, Succulent Karoo, Savanna and Grassland biomes at altitudes ranging from 29 to 2,020 m.

Some individuals have also been collected from crops such as lucerne and pistachio orchards.

== Conservation ==
Monaeses quadrituberculatus is listed as Least Concern by the South African National Biodiversity Institute due to its wide geographical range. The species is protected in 12 protected areas.

== Taxonomy ==
Monaeses quadrituberculatus was originally described by Reginald Frederick Lawrence in 1927 from Namibia. The species was revised by Dippenaar-Schoeman in 1984.
