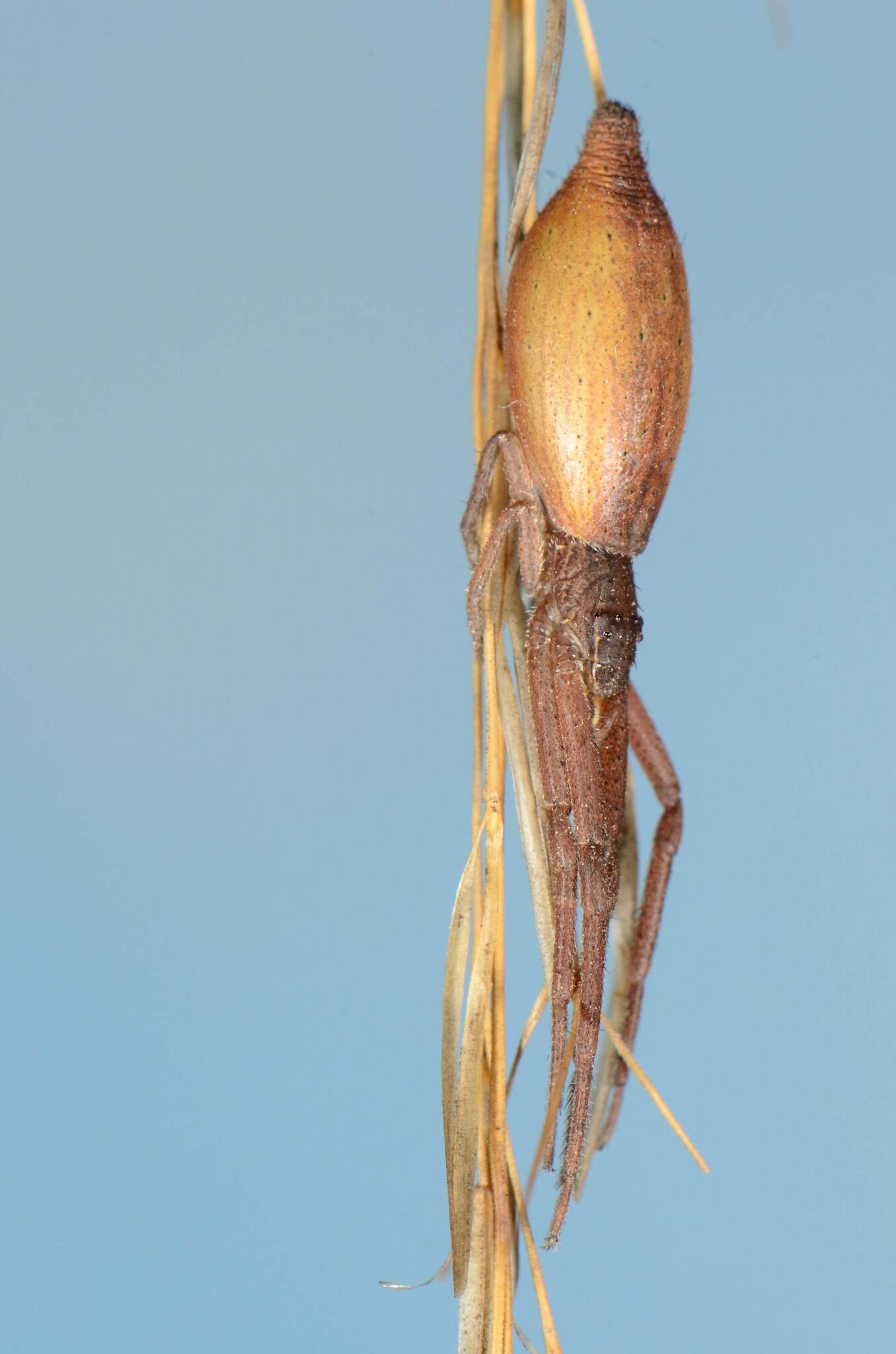
- female M. paradoxus
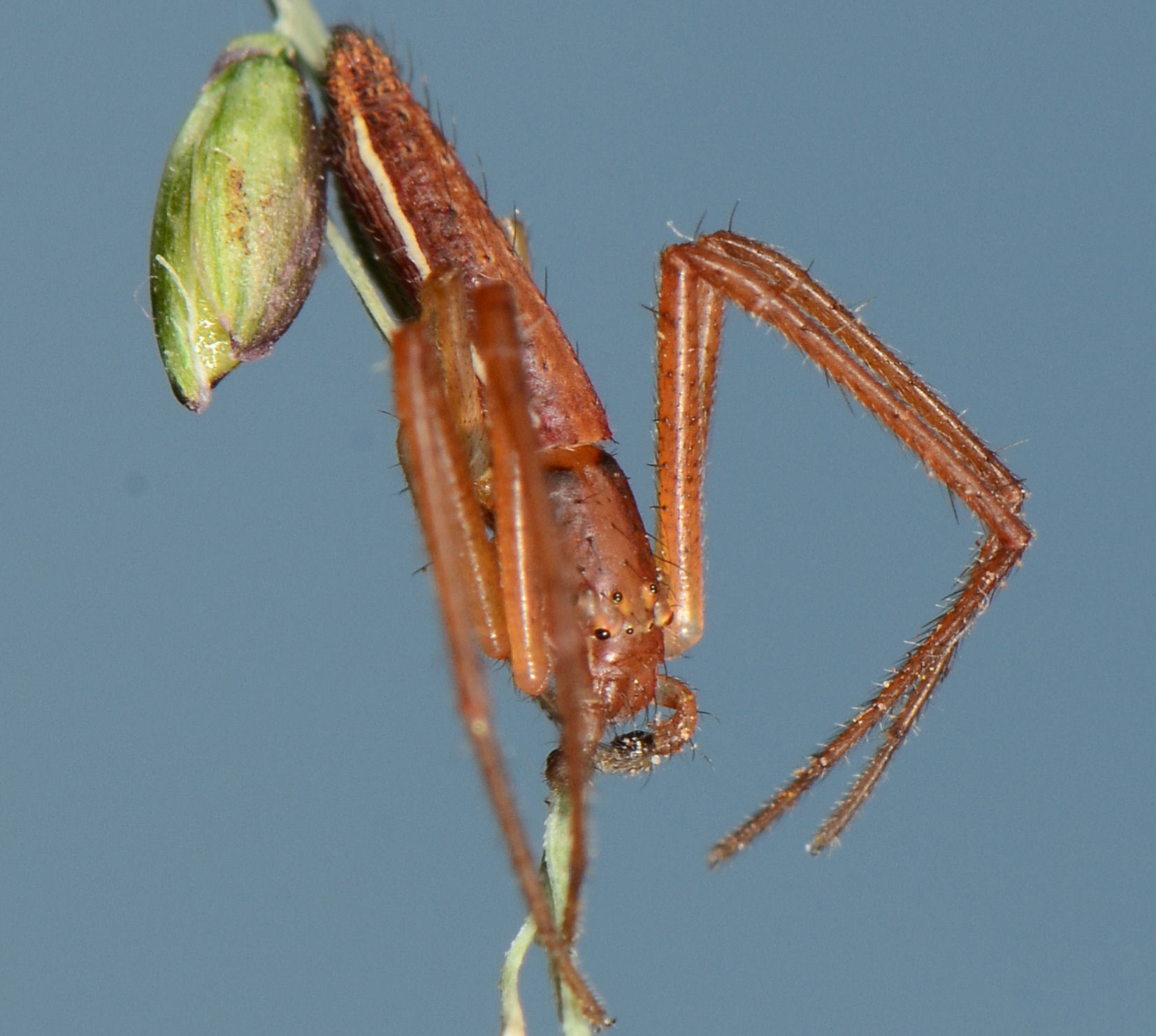
- male M. fuscus

Scientific classification
- Kingdom: Animalia
- Phylum: Arthropoda
- Subphylum: Chelicerata
- Class: Arachnida
- Order: Araneae
- Infraorder: Araneomorphae
- Family: Thomisidae
- Genus: Monaeses; Thorell, 1869

Type species
- Monaeses paradoxus (Lucas, 1846)

Species
- See text

Diversity
- 28 species

= Monaeses =

Genus of spiders

Monaeses is a genus of crab spiders in the family Thomisidae.

== Distribution ==
Most species are found in Asia and Africa, with a few reaching into Europe and two endemic to Australia.

== Description ==
The genus Monaeses was described by Tamerlan Thorellin 1869 with a wide distribution represented by 28 accepted species worldwide. Nine species are known from Africa and seven from South Africa.

Females are small to medium-sized with males slightly smaller. The body colour ranges from cream to dark brown or grey with a mottled appearance, with the abdomen frequently decorated with white longitudinal lines laterally.

The carapace is elongate and usually has simple, erect setae. There are eight eyes arranged in two rows. The lateral eyes are usually on flat tubercles and the posterior eye row is evenly spaced.

The abdomen is long and slender with sides almost parallel. The caudal part varies from short and not extending beyond the spinnerets to very long and extending beyond the spinnerets. The caudal extension is covered with numerous folds and clothed with long setae, while the remainder of the abdomen dorsally has long setae arranged in rows.

The legs are laterigrade with legs I and II usually longer than III and IV. The anterior legs have series of strong spines on the tibiae and metatarsi.

== Life style ==
Spiders in this genus are free-living plant dwellers. Their long, straw-coloured bodies provide excellent camouflage as they await their prey on grass. They are slow-moving and cling to plants with outstretched legs, with the first two pairs directed forward and the third and fourth pairs directed backwards along the axis of stems. Their robust front legs and potent venom enable them to capture and subdue prey up to twice their own size.

Females attach their egg-sacs to tufts of grass.

== Taxonomy ==
Species in southern Africa were revised by Dippenaar-Schoeman in 1984.

== Species ==
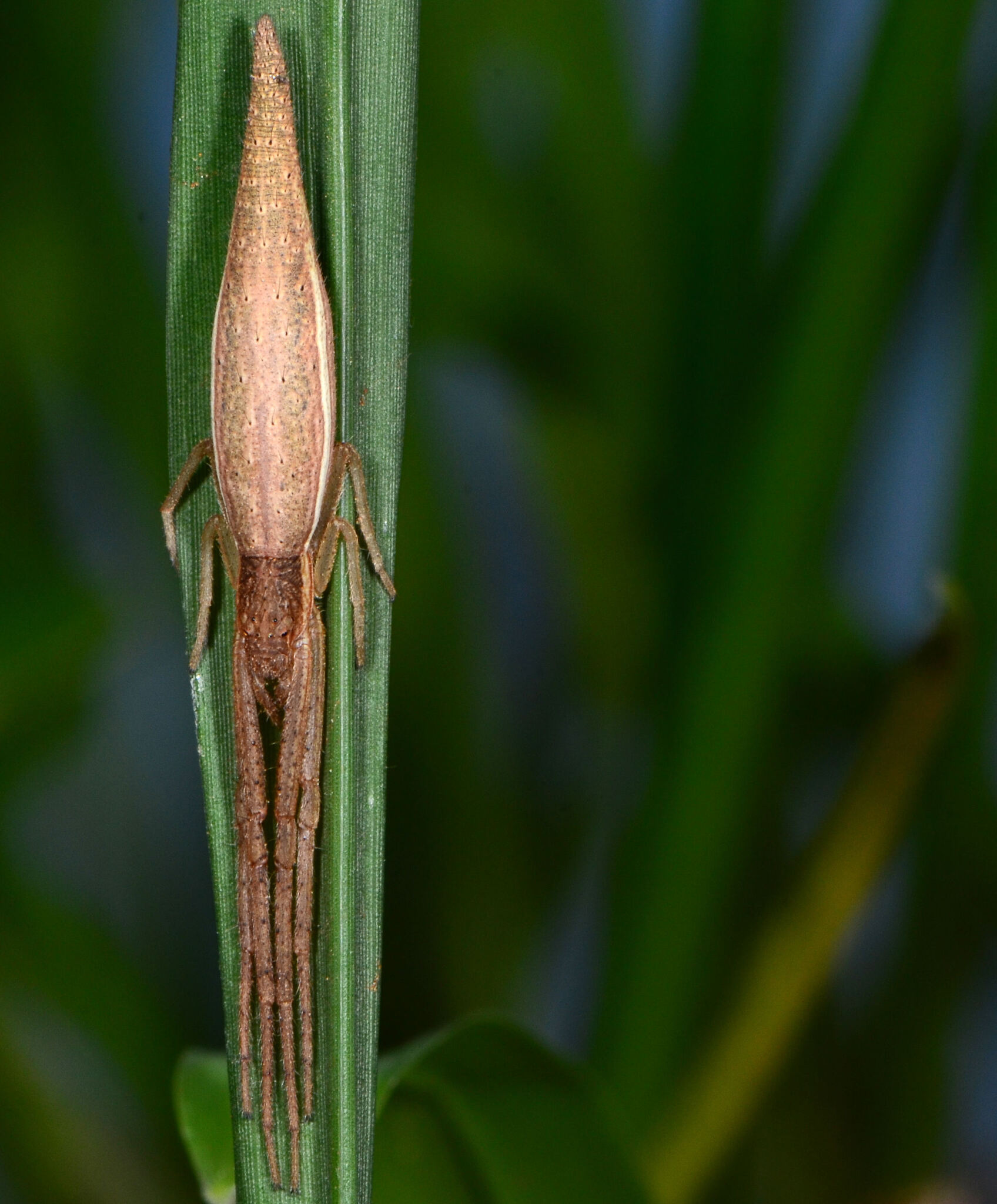
female M. austrinus

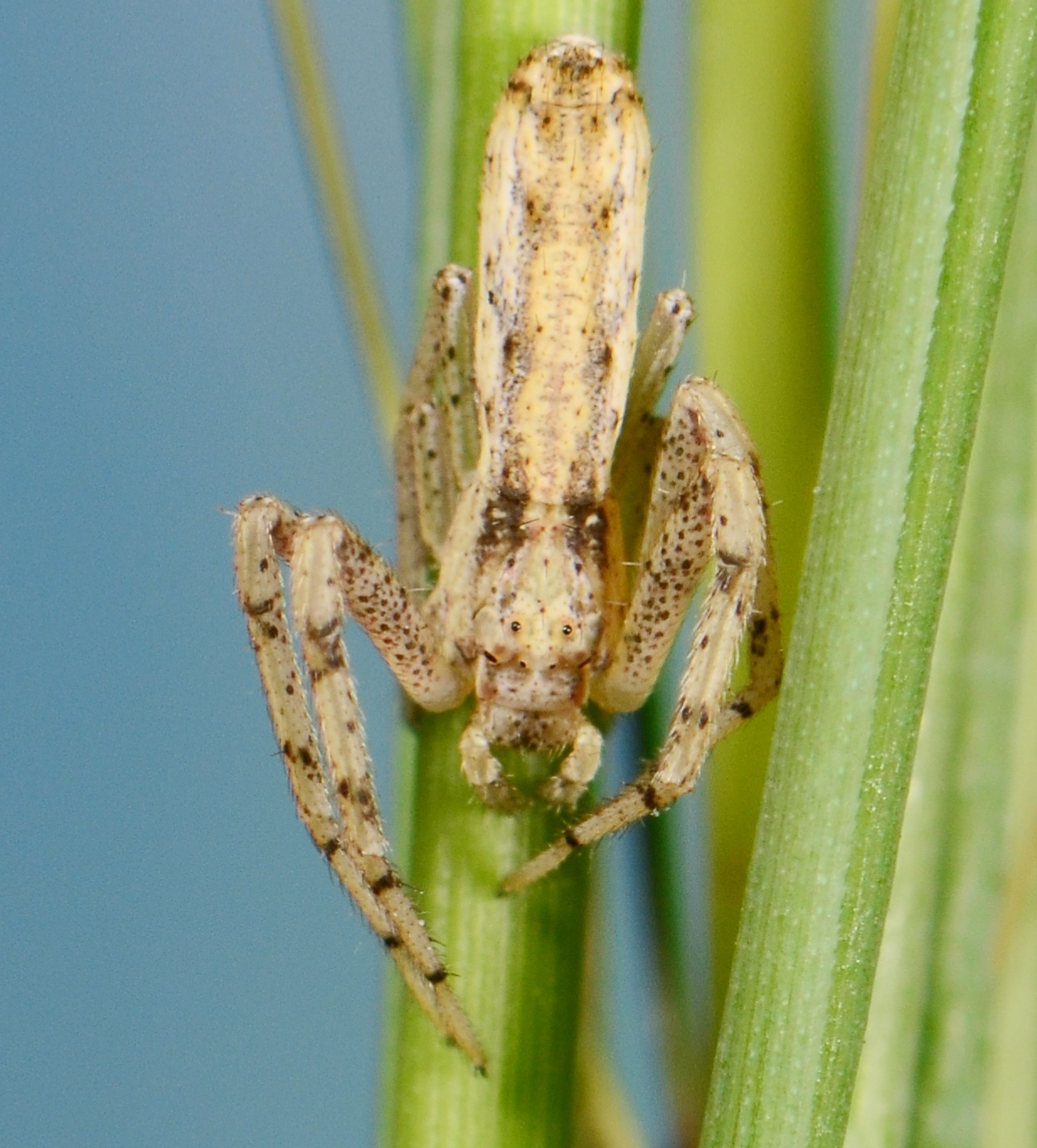
female M. gibbus

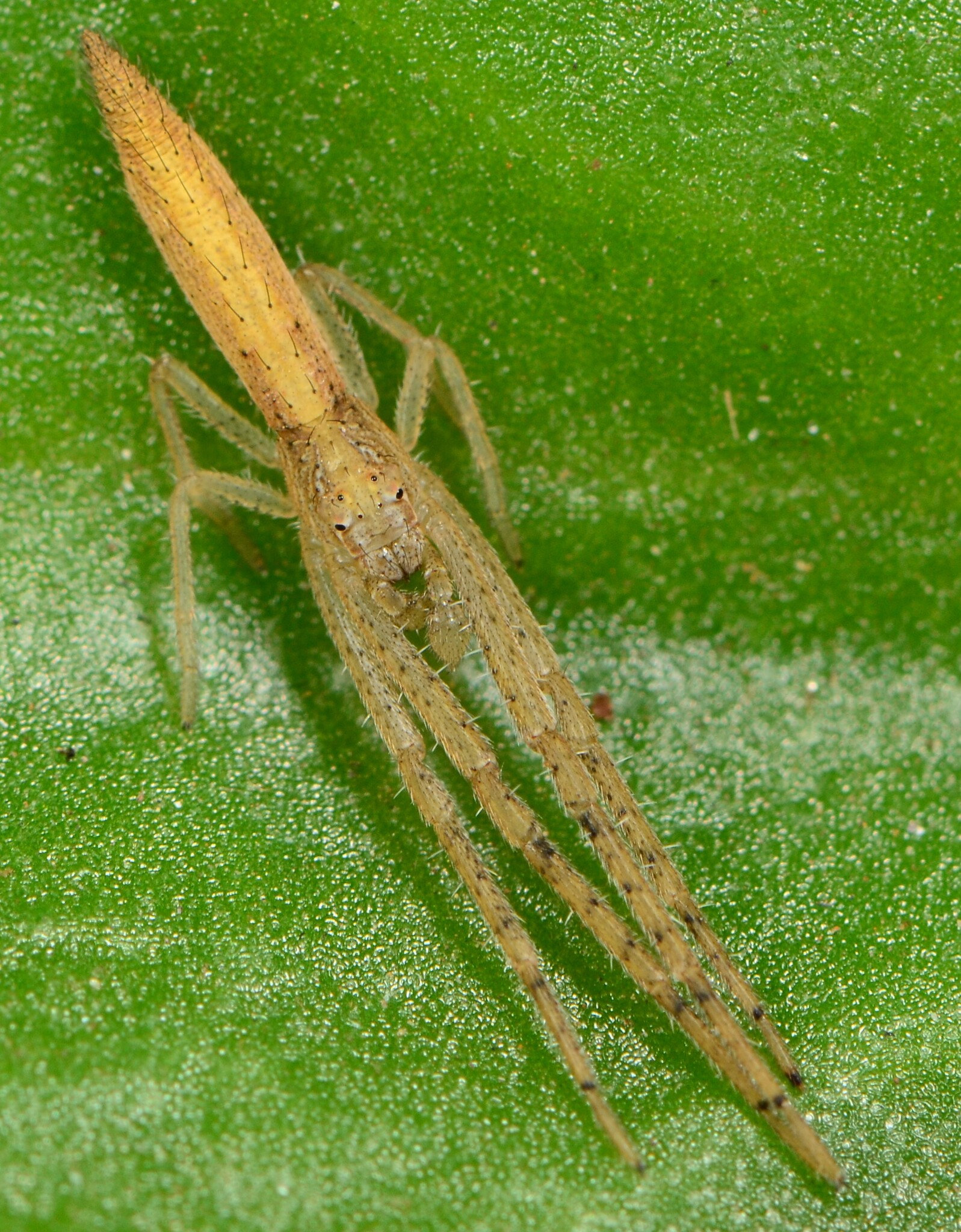
female M. griseus

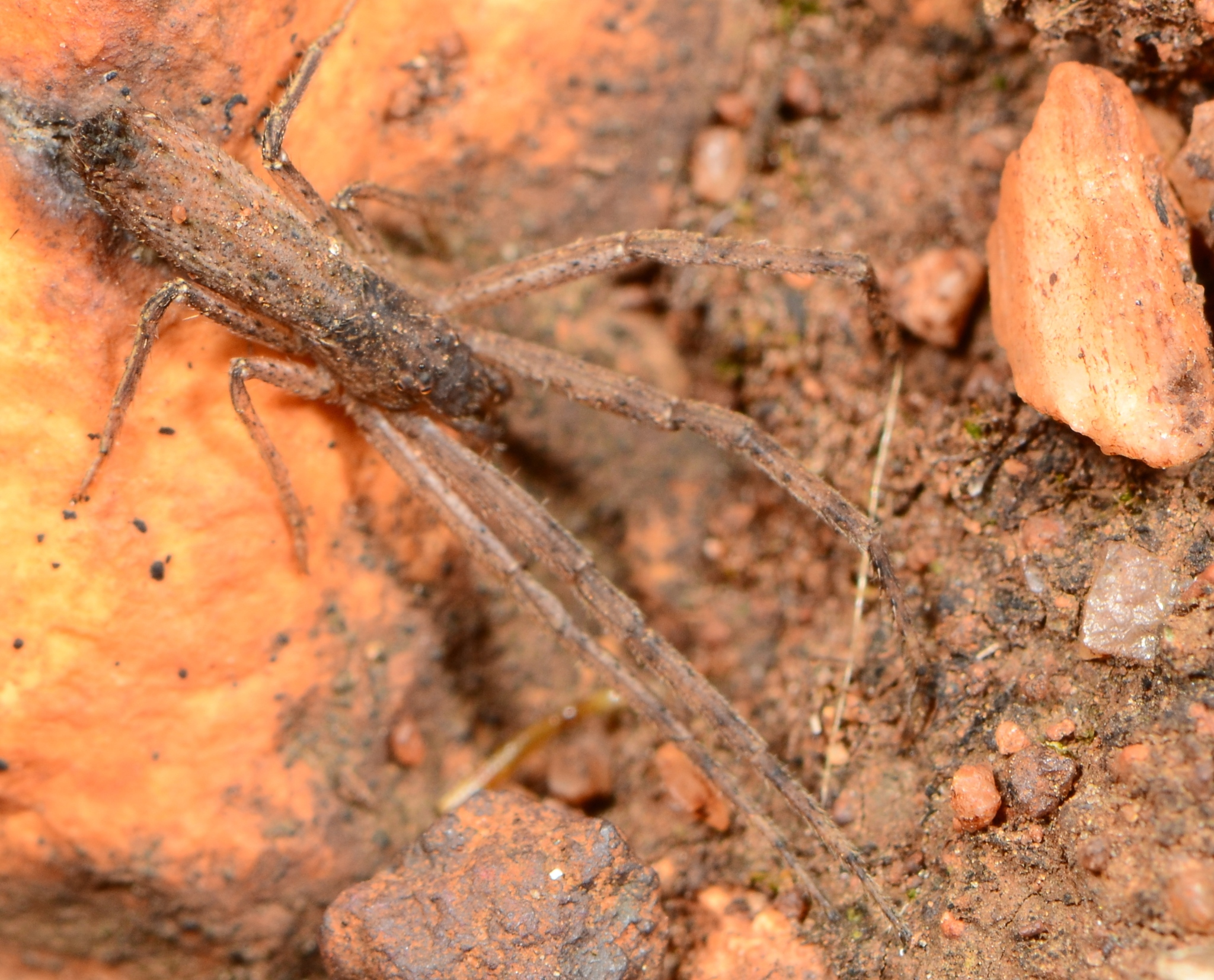
male M. quadrituberculatus

As of October 2025, this genus includes 28 species:

- Monaeses aciculus (Simon, 1903) – Nepal to Japan, Philippines
- Monaeses attenuatus O. Pickard-Cambridge, 1899 – Sri Lanka
- Monaeses austrinus Simon, 1910 – Ivory Coast, Namibia, Botswana, Zimbabwe, South Africa, Eswatini
- Monaeses brevicaudatus L. Koch, 1874 – Australia (Queensland)
- Monaeses caudatus Tang & Song, 1988 – China
- Monaeses cinerascens (Thorell, 1887) – Sri Lanka, Myanmar
- Monaeses fasciculiger Jézéquel, 1964 – Ivory Coast
- Monaeses fuscus Dippenaar-Schoeman, 1984 – South Africa
- Monaeses gibbus Dippenaar-Schoeman, 1984 – South Africa
- Monaeses greeni O. Pickard-Cambridge, 1899 – Sri Lanka
- Monaeses griseus Pavesi, 1897 – Sudan, Ethiopia, Somalia, Namibia, South Africa
- Monaeses guineensis Millot, 1942 – Guinea
- Monaeses habamatinikus Barrion & Litsinger, 1995 – Philippines
- Monaeses israeliensis Levy, 1973 – Bulgaria, Greece, Turkey, Ukraine, Caucasus, Middle East, Iran, Kazakhstan, Central Asia, India, China
- Monaeses jabalpurensis Gajbe & Rane, 1992 – India
- Monaeses lucasi (Taczanowski, 1872) – Guyana
- Monaeses mukundi Tikader, 1980 – India
- Monaeses nigritus Simon, 1909 – Vietnam
- Monaeses pachpediensis (Tikader, 1980) – India
- Monaeses paradoxus (Lucas, 1846) – Southern Europe, Africa, Caucasus (type species)
- Monaeses parvati Tikader, 1963 – India
- Monaeses pustulosus Pavesi, 1895 – Guinea, Burkina Faso, Eritrea, Ethiopia, DR Congo, Kenya, Tanzania, Namibia, Zimbabwe, South Africa
- Monaeses quadrituberculatus Lawrence, 1927 – Tanzania, Namibia, Botswana, South Africa
- Monaeses reticulatus (Simon, 1909) – Vietnam
- Monaeses tuberculatus (Thorell, 1895) – Myanmar
- Monaeses xiphosurus Simon, 1907 – Guinea-Bissau
- Monaeses xizang Wang, Lu & Z. S. Zhang, 2024 – China
- Monaeses xyphoides L. Koch, 1874 – Australia (Queensland)
