= Monaeses greeni =

Scientific classification
- Kingdom: Animalia
- Phylum: Arthropoda
- Subphylum: Chelicerata
- Class: Arachnida
- Order: Araneae
- Infraorder: Araneomorphae
- Family: Thomisidae
- Genus: Monaeses
- Species: M. greeni

Binomial name
- Monaeses greeni O. Pickard-Cambridge, 1899

Species of spider

Monaeses greeni is a species of spider of the genus Monaeses. It is endemic to Sri Lanka.

== See also ==
- List of Thomisidae species
