= Giant's Castle =

Mountain in South Africa

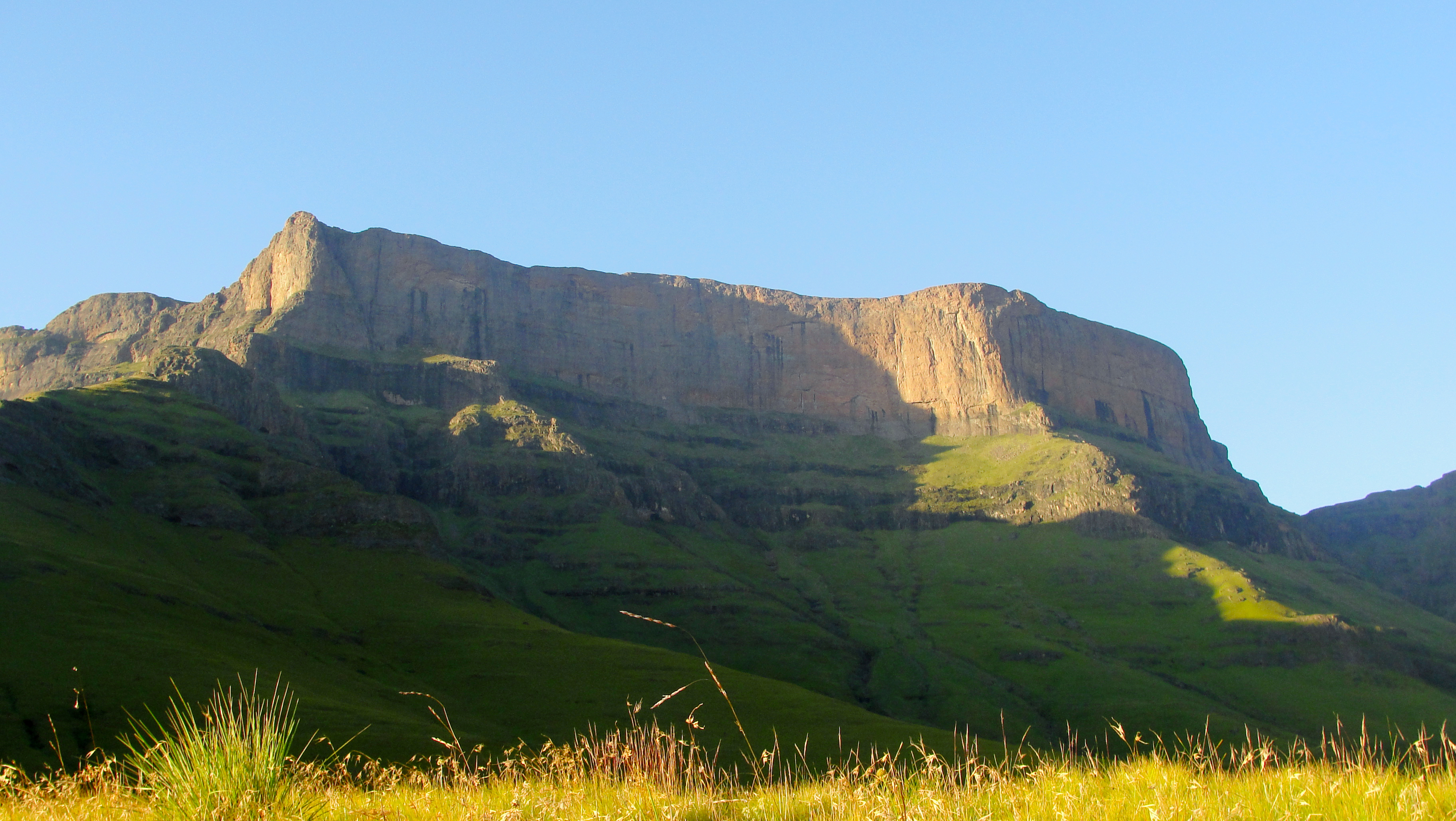
- Giant's Castle at sunrise

Highest point
- Elevation: 3,315 m (10,876 ft)
- Prominence: 218 m (715 ft)
- Listing: List of mountains in South Africa
- Coordinates: 29°20′0″S 29°29′0″E

Geography
- Location within South Africa
- Location: KwaZulu-Natal, South Africa
- Parent range: Drakensberg

Climbing
- Easiest route: Scramble

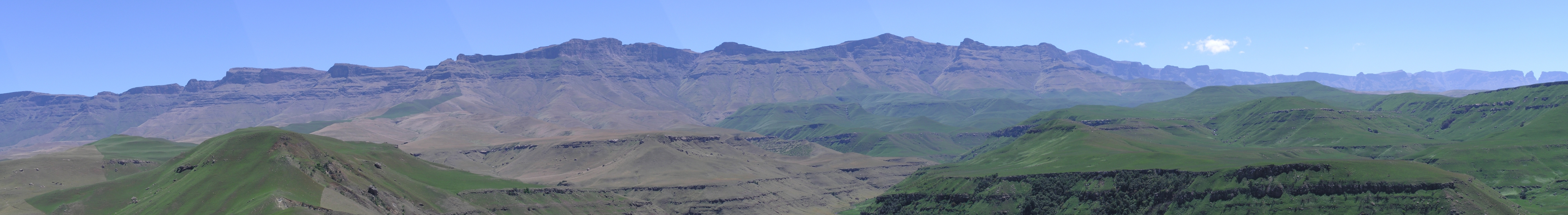
Panorama at Giant's Castle

Giant's Castle 3D

Giant's Castle is a mountain located within the Drakensberg range in KwaZulu-Natal, South Africa. It includes a grassy plateau nestled among the deep valleys of the southern end of the central Drakensberg. Together, the shape of the peaks and escarpment are thought to resemble a sleeping giant's profile; hence, its name.

Giant's Castle is best known for its nature reserve and the bushman rock art preserved at its main caves, and the game reserve is home of the eland as well as the bearded vulture and Cape vulture. The area is considered one of South Africa's many adventure areas, and attracts hikers, nature enthusiasts, and other tourists. It also hosts the Giant's Challenge marathon in April each year. The Treverton Grade 10s take a 15 day hike to summit this peak in their 3rd term.

== Hiking trails ==
There are in excess of 25 walks in the Giant's Castle Game Reserve. The 285 kilometres (177 mi) network of trails here includes 3 kilometres (1.9 mi) to 30 kilometres (19 mi) hikes, spanning from 1 hour to overnight.

There are currently 14 recognized escarpment passes in the region (listed north to south):

- Corner Pass
- Around the Corner Pass (variation route on Corner Pass with alternative summit)
- Judge Pass
- Gypaetus Pass (opened in September 2012)
- Bannerman Pass
- Thumb Pass (opened in 1997)
- North Hlubi Pass
- South Hlubi Pass
- Langalibalele Pass
- Bond Pass (opened in 2014)
- North Jarding/Jarateng Pass
- Central Jarding/Jarateng Pass
- South Jarding/Jarateng Pass
- Giant's Castle Pass
