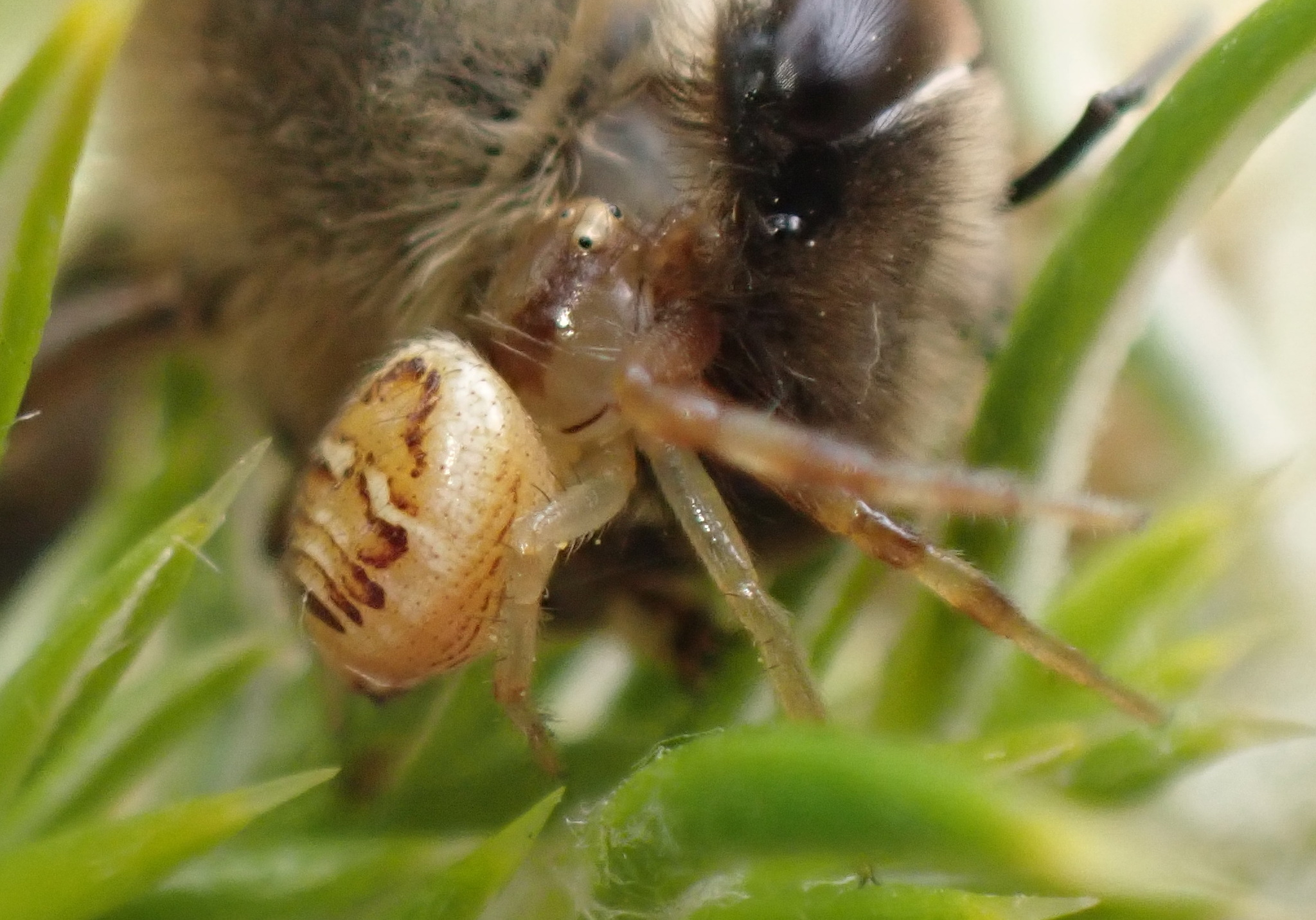
- female from South Africa
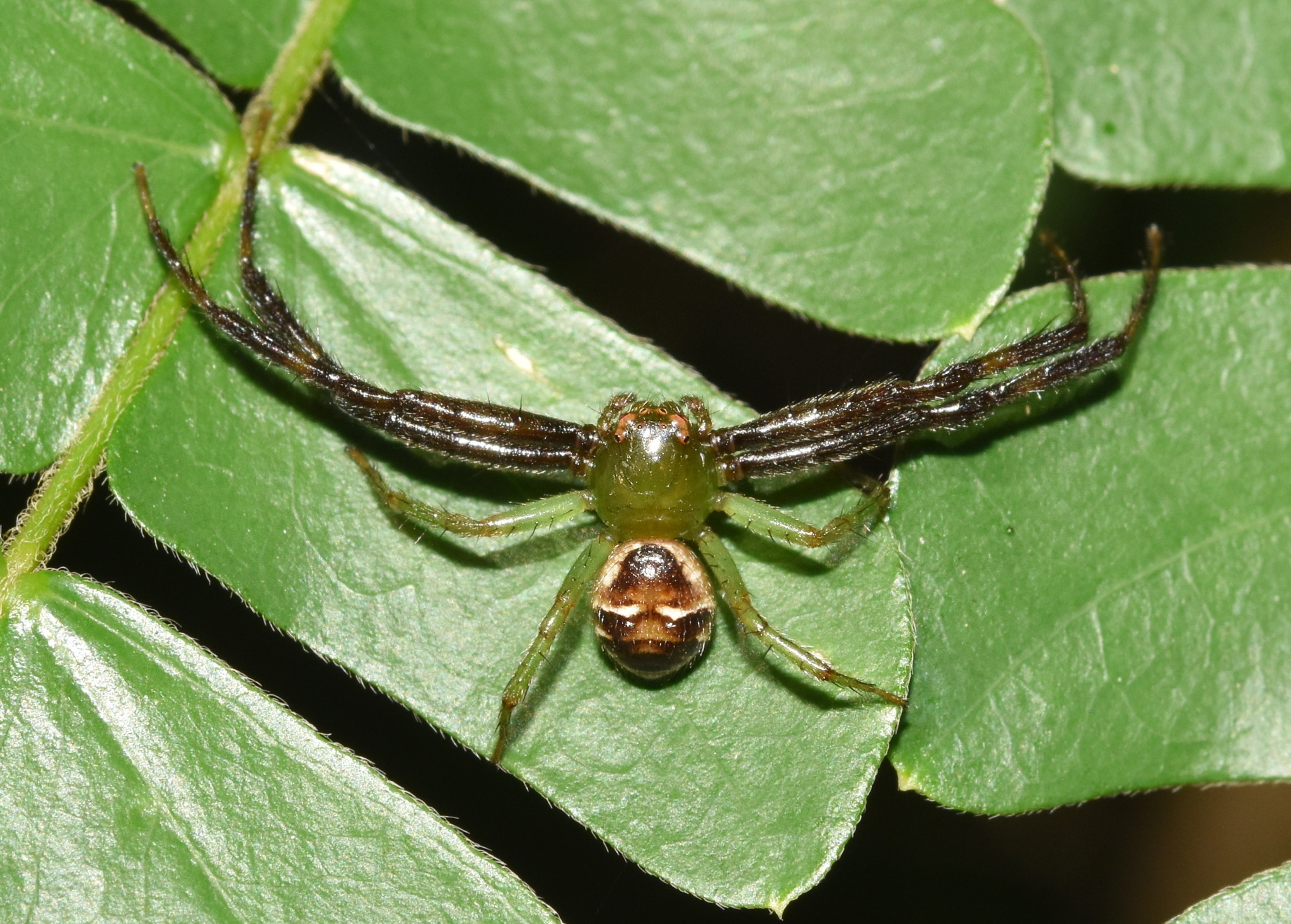
- male from South Africa

Scientific classification
- Kingdom: Animalia
- Phylum: Arthropoda
- Subphylum: Chelicerata
- Class: Arachnida
- Order: Araneae
- Infraorder: Araneomorphae
- Family: Thomisidae
- Genus: Synema
- Species: S. imitatrix

Binomial name
- Synema imitatrix (Pavesi, 1883)

Synonyms
- Diaea imitatrix Pavesi, 1883; Synaema (Baerella) imitator Dahl, 1907 (lapsus); Synema imitator Lessert, 1919 (lapsus)

= Synema imitatrix =

Spotted African mask spider

Species of crab spider

Synema imitatrix is a species of crab spider in the family Thomisidae. It is endemic to eastern and southern Africa.

== Distribution ==
Synema imitatrix has been recorded from Ethiopia, Mozambique, South Africa, and Eswatini. In South Africa, it has been found in all provinces and occurs in more than 15 protected areas.

Notable locations include Kruger National Park, Mountain Zebra National Park, Giant's Castle Nature Reserve, Karoo National Park, and Kirstenbosch National Botanical Garden.

== Habitat ==
Synema imitatrix is a free-living spider found on vegetation and occasionally inside flower corollas. It has been recorded from all biomes of South Africa except the Desert and Succulent Karoo biomes. The species has also been found in agricultural areas, including avocado, citrus and macadamia orchards, as well as tomato fields.

The altitudinal range extends from 1 to 1,902 metres above sea level.

== Description ==
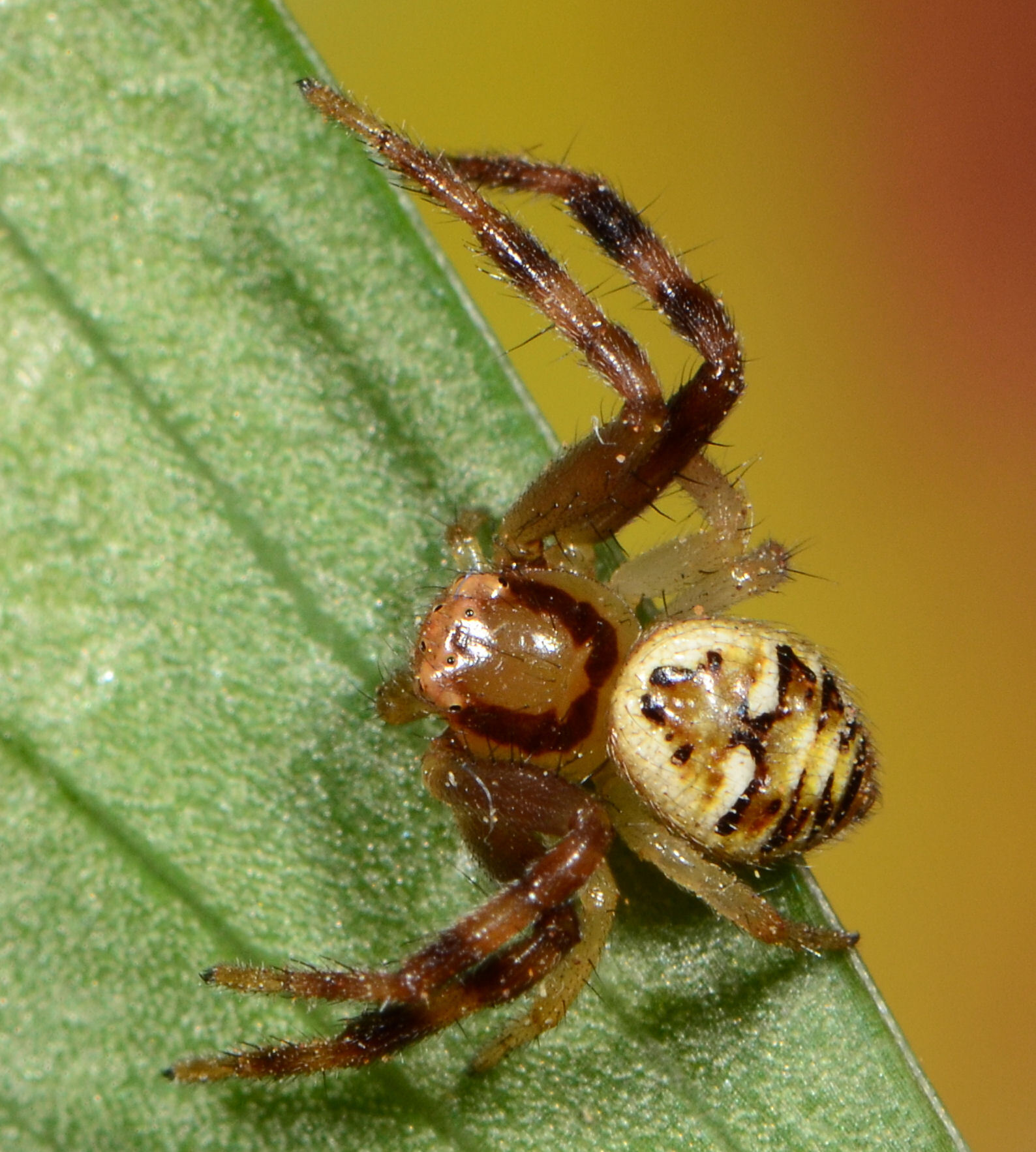
female

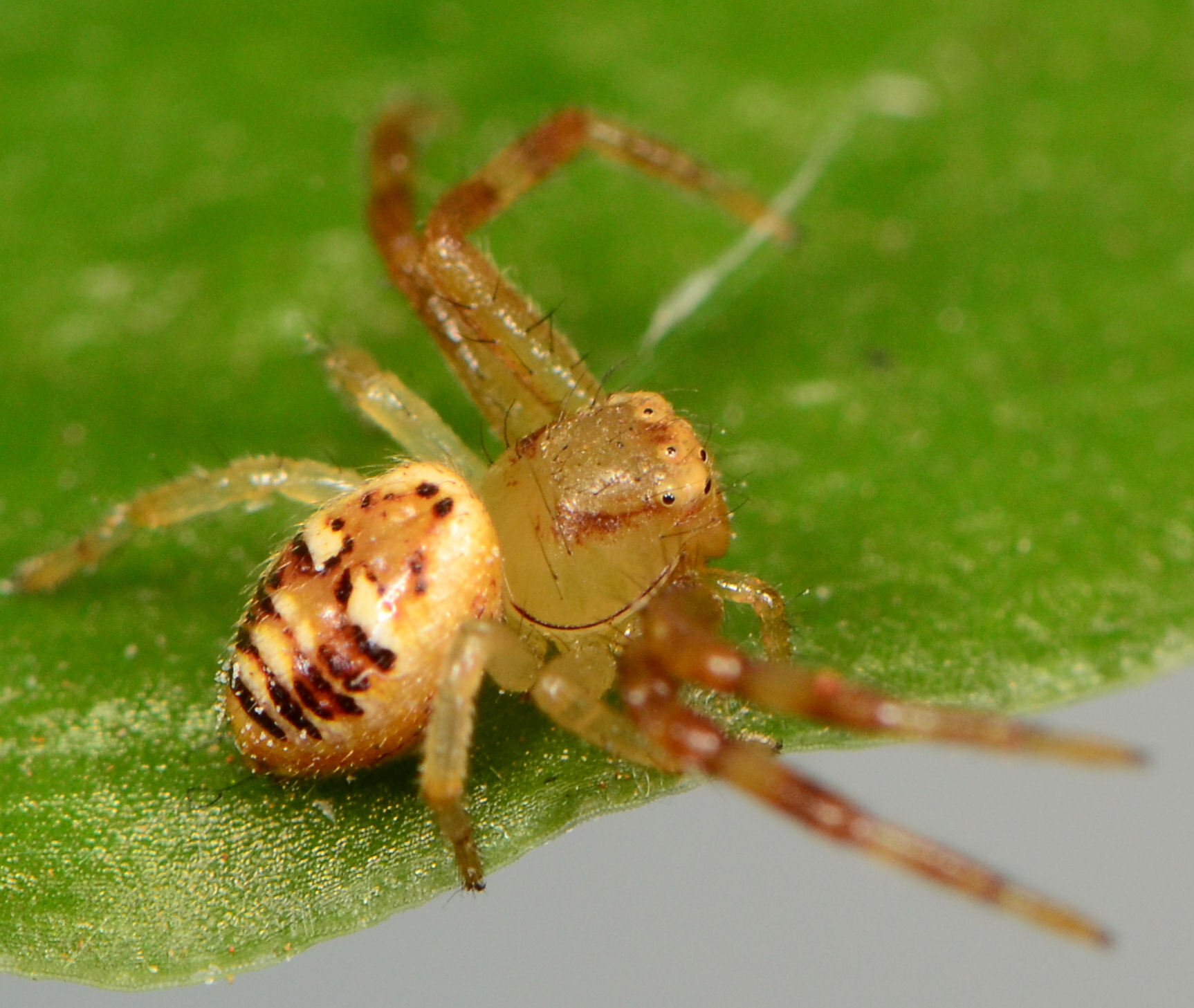
female

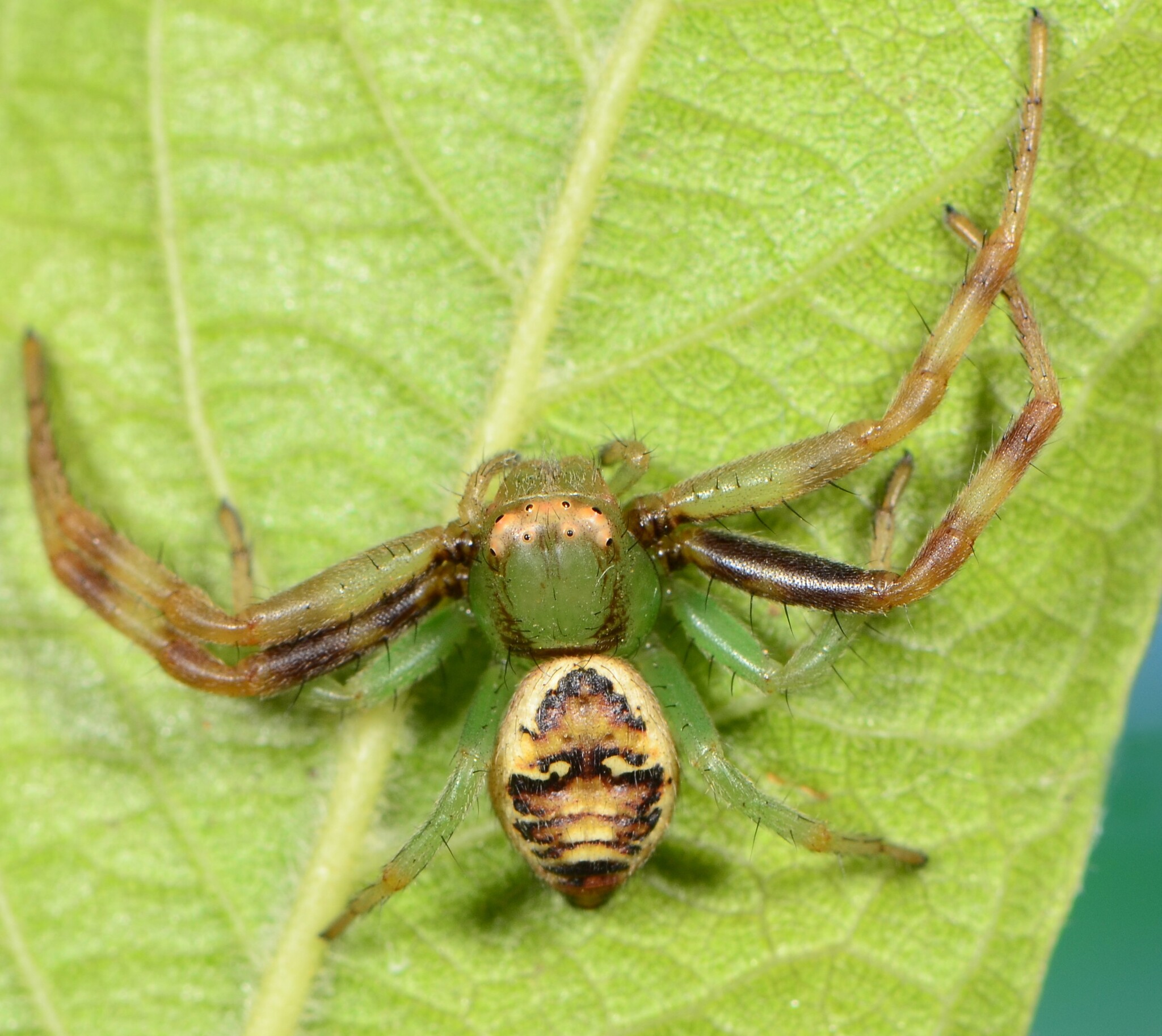
female

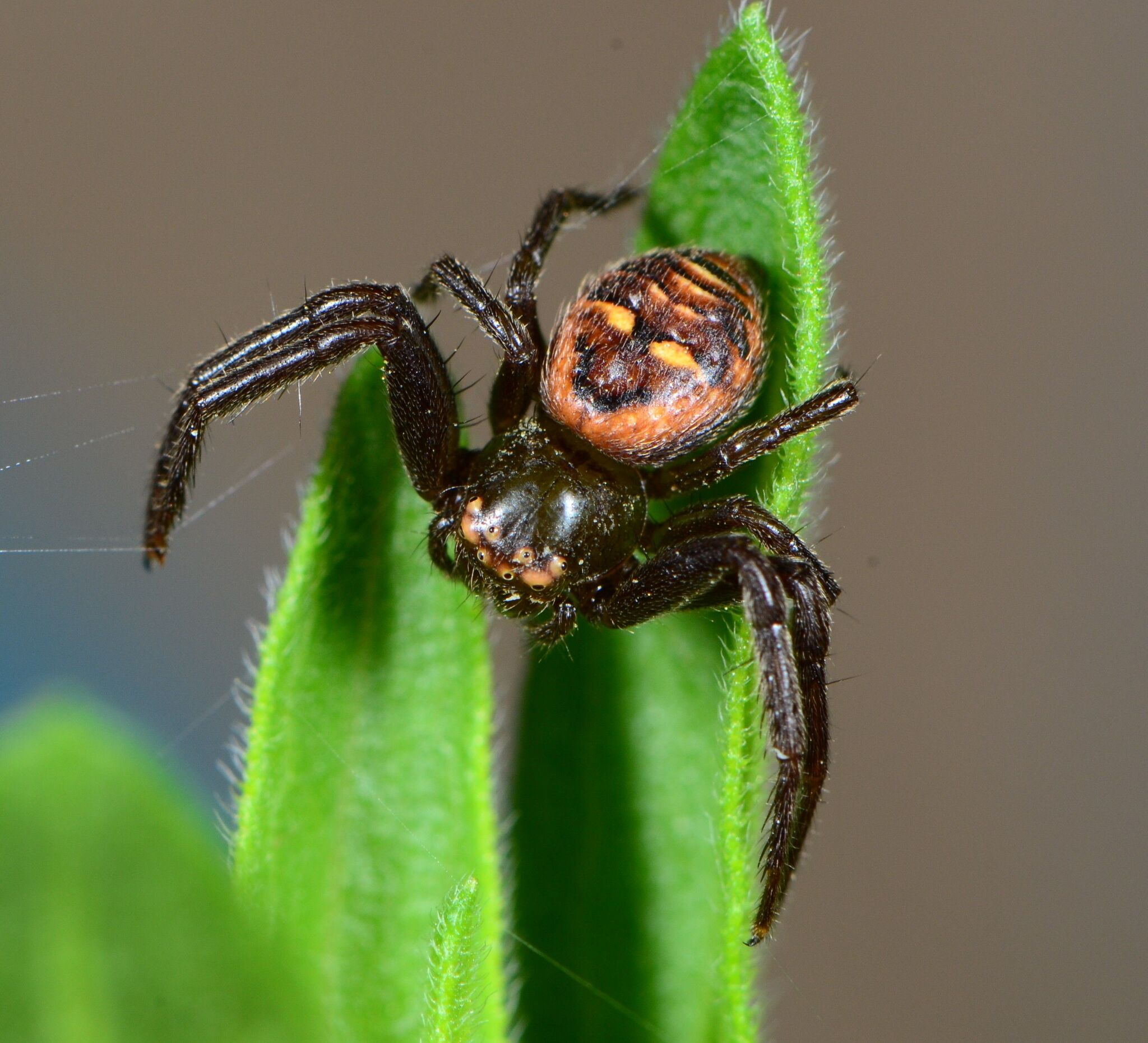
juvenile female

== Etymology ==
The specific epithet imitatrix is Latin for "imitator", likely referring to the species' ability to camouflage among flowers.

== Taxonomy ==
The species was originally described by Italian arachnologist Pietro Pavesi in 1883 as Diaea imitatrix from specimens collected in Ethiopia. It was later transferred to the genus Synema by Pavesi himself in 1897.

The species has been subject to several nomenclatural errors, including the misspelling imitator used by some authors, which was corrected by Nentwig et al. in 2019.

== Conservation status ==
Synema imitatrix is classified as Least Concern due to its wide geographical range across multiple African countries and its presence in numerous protected areas. No known threats have been identified, and no specific conservation actions are recommended.
