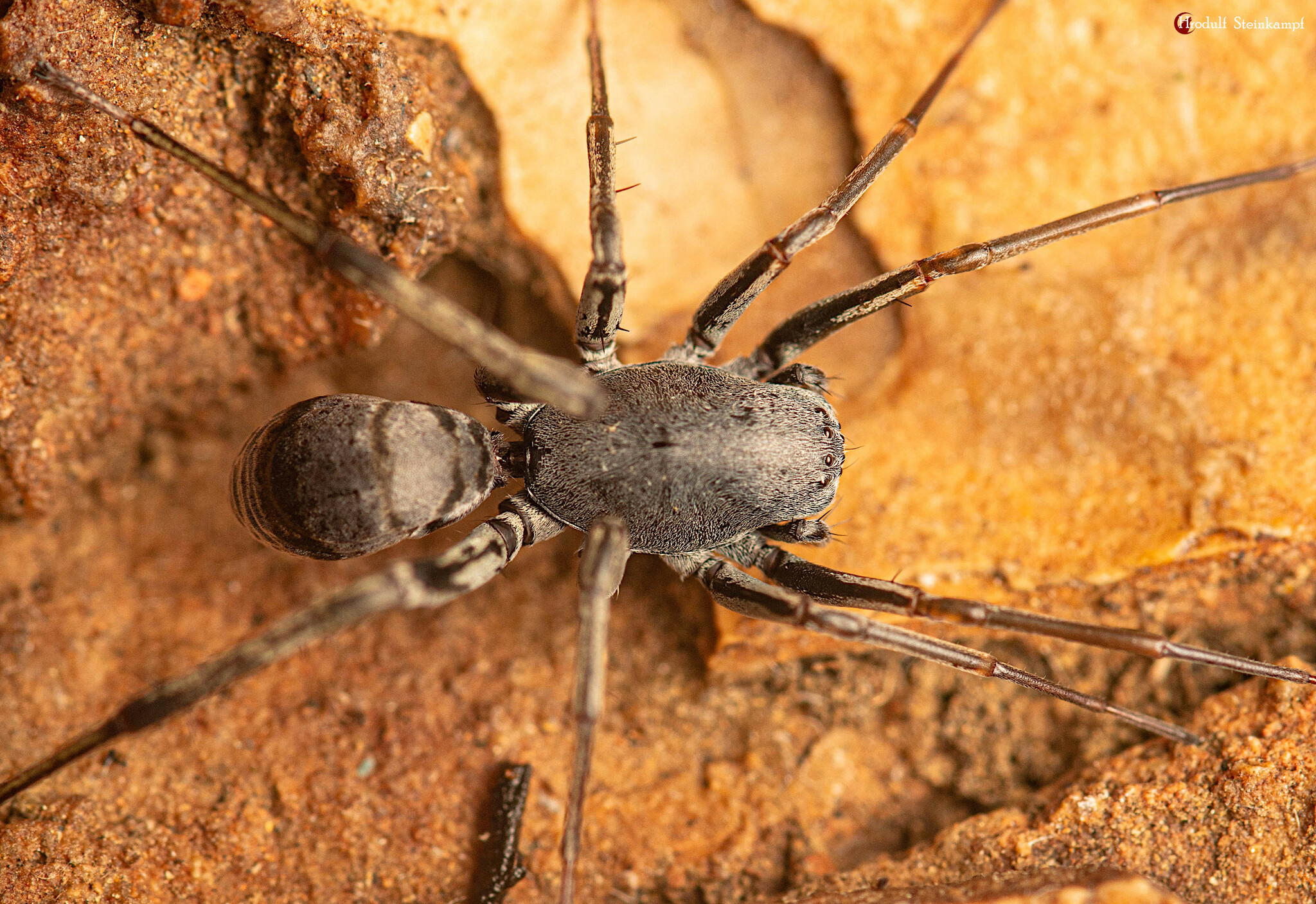

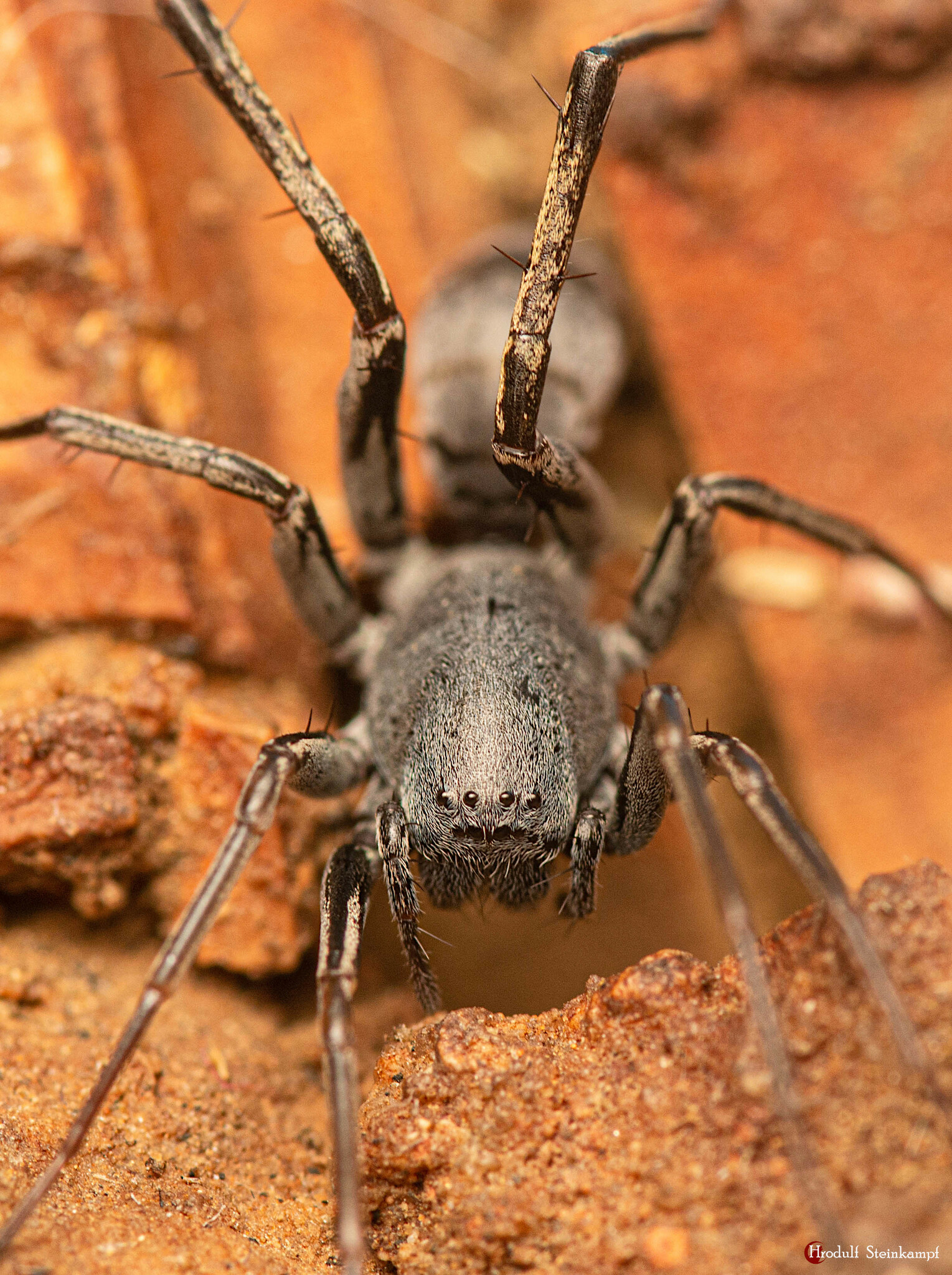

Scientific classification
- Kingdom: Animalia
- Phylum: Arthropoda
- Subphylum: Chelicerata
- Class: Arachnida
- Order: Araneae
- Infraorder: Araneomorphae
- Family: Corinnidae
- Genus: Corinnomma
- Species: C. semiglabrum

Binomial name
- Corinnomma semiglabrum (Simon, 1896)

= Corinnomma semiglabrum =

Common banded ant-like sac spider

Species of spider

Corinnomma semiglabrum is a species of spider in the family Corinnidae. It occurs in Zambia, Namibia, Zimbabwe, Mozambique, South Africa, and Eswatini and is commonly known as the common banded ant-like sac spider.

== Distribution ==
Corinnomma semiglabrum is found in Zambia, Eswatini, Mozambique, Namibia, Zimbabwe, and South Africa. In South Africa, it has been recorded from five provinces, Gauteng, KwaZulu-Natal, Limpopo, Mpumalanga, and North West at altitudes ranging from 6 to 1,762 m above sea level.

The species occurs in several protected areas including iSimangaliso Wetland Park, Ndumo Game Reserve, Tembe Elephant Park, Lhuvhondo Nature Reserve, Mabula Nature Reserve, and Nylsvley Nature Reserve.

== Habitat and ecology ==
Corinnomma semiglabrum is an ant-mimicking species that is mainly collected in pitfall traps or leaf litter, indicating it is primarily epigeic. The species inhabits Grassland, Indian Ocean Coastal Belt, and Savanna biomes. It has also been collected from citrus orchards.

== Description ==
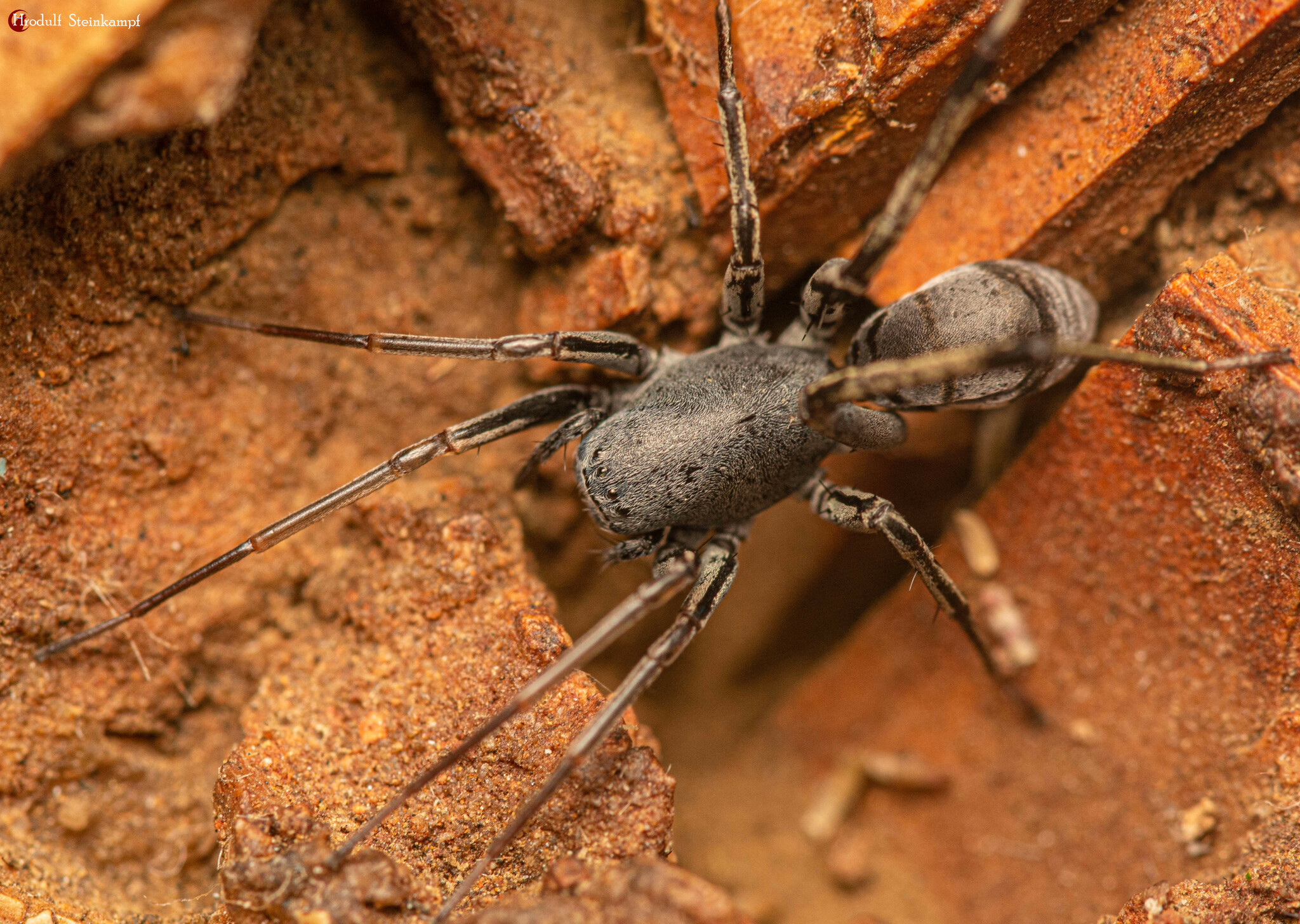

== Conservation ==
Corinnomma semiglabrum is listed as Least Concern by the South African National Biodiversity Institute due to its wide geographical range. The species faces no significant threats and is recorded from several protected areas.

== Taxonomy ==
The species was originally described by Eugène Simon in 1896 as Apochinomma semiglabrum from Makapan in the Limpopo Province. It was revised by Haddad in 2006, who transferred it to the genus Corinnomma.
