= Corinnomma lawrencei =

Lawrence's banded ant-like sac spider

Conservation status
- Least Concern (SANBI Red List)

Scientific classification
- Kingdom: Animalia
- Phylum: Arthropoda
- Subphylum: Chelicerata
- Class: Arachnida
- Order: Araneae
- Infraorder: Araneomorphae
- Family: Corinnidae
- Genus: Corinnomma
- Species: C. lawrencei

Binomial name
- Corinnomma lawrencei Haddad, 2006

Species of spider

Corinnomma lawrencei is a species of spider in the family Corinnidae. It occurs in Tanzania, Zimbabwe, Mozambique, and South Africa and is commonly known as Lawrence's banded ant-like sac spider.

== Distribution ==
Corinnomma lawrencei is found in Tanzania, Mozambique, Zimbabwe, and South Africa. In South Africa, it has been recorded from two provinces, KwaZulu-Natal and Limpopo at altitudes ranging from 47 to 1,411 m above sea level.

The species occurs in several protected areas including Ndumo Game Reserve, Kruger National Park, and Lhuvhondo Nature Reserve.

== Habitat and ecology ==
Corinnomma lawrencei is an ant-mimicking ground-dwelling spider that is usually collected from leaf litter. It is often found near nests of Camponotus cinctellus and Anoplolepis custodiens ants in the Savanna biome.

== Description ==
Corinnomma lawrencei is known from both sexes.

== Conservation ==
Corinnomma lawrencei is listed as Least Concern by the South African National Biodiversity Institute due to its wide geographical range. The species faces no significant threats and has been recorded from several protected areas.

== Taxonomy ==
The species was described by Charles R. Haddad in 2006 from Mozambique.
