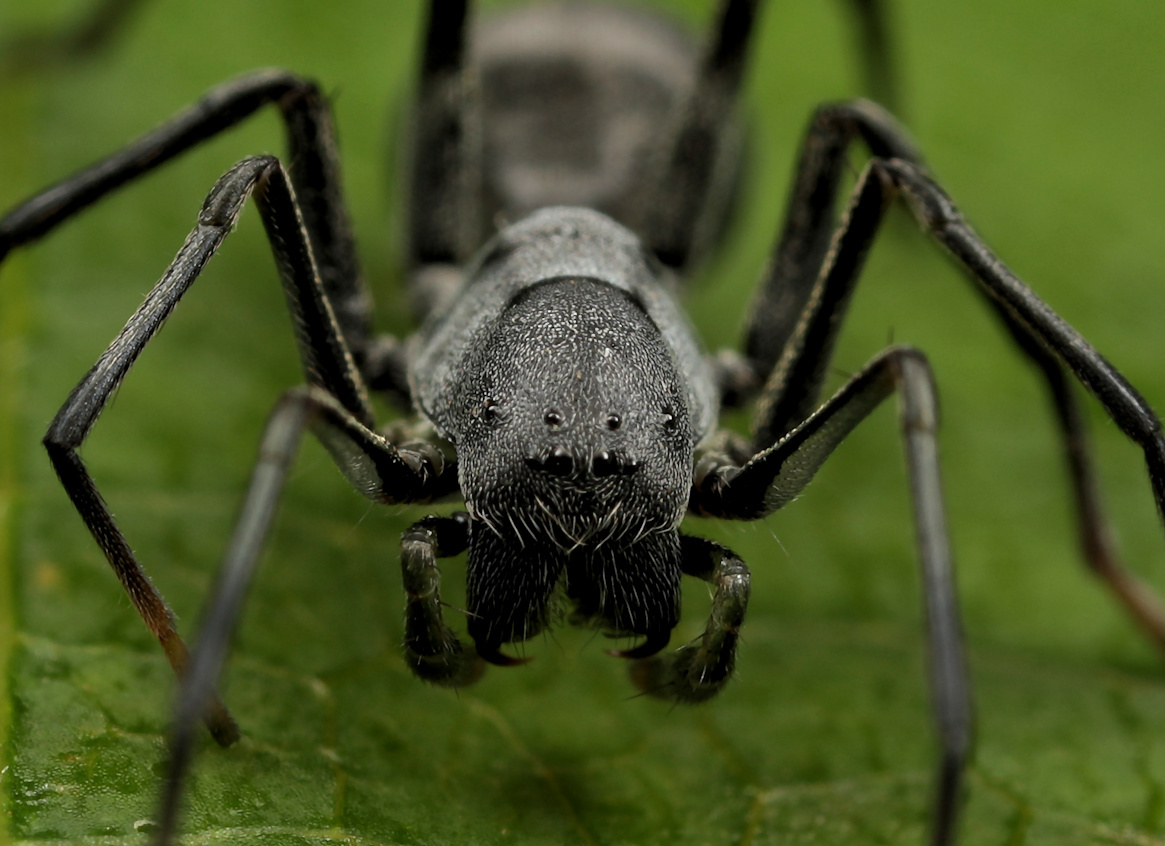

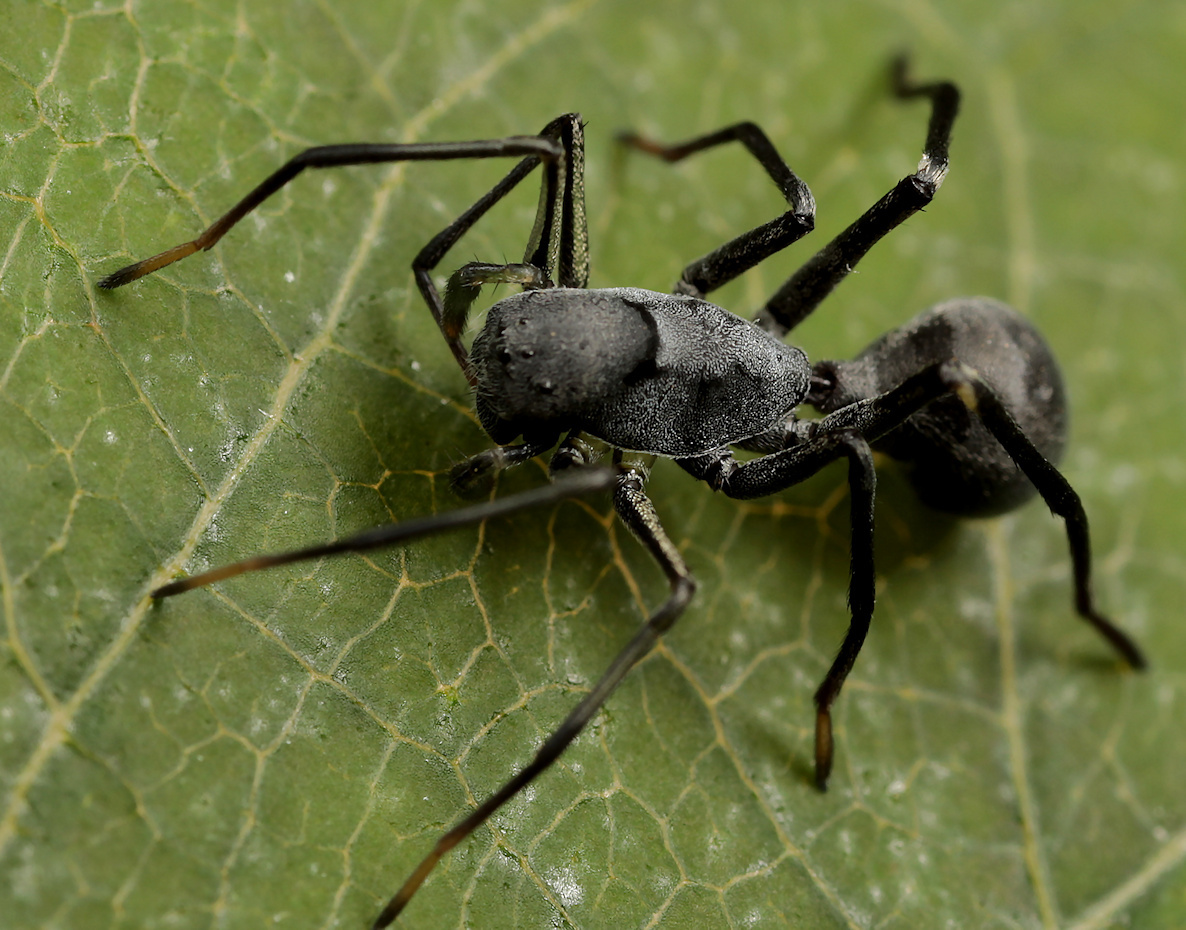

Scientific classification
- Kingdom: Animalia
- Phylum: Arthropoda
- Subphylum: Chelicerata
- Class: Arachnida
- Order: Araneae
- Infraorder: Araneomorphae
- Family: Corinnidae
- Genus: Apochinomma
- Species: A. formicaeforme

Binomial name
- Apochinomma formicaeforme Pavesi, 1881

= Apochinomma formicaeforme =

African Apochinomma Ant-like Sac Spider

Species of spider

Apochinomma formicaeforme is a species of spider in the family Corinnidae. It is widespread throughout Africa and is commonly known as African Apochinomma ant-like sac spider.

== Distribution ==
Apochinomma formicaeforme is widely distributed throughout the Afrotropical Region. In South Africa, it is known from KwaZulu-Natal, Limpopo, Mpumalanga, and North West provinces at altitudes ranging from 8 to 1,171 m above sea level.

== Habitat and ecology ==
The species is a free-living wanderer, collected from the foliage of trees and shrubs in the Forest, Indian Ocean Coastal Belt and Savanna biomes. Apochinomma formicaeforme belongs to the formicaeforme group which are mimics of Polyrhachis ants that occur on foliage and the soil surface.

== Description ==
Apochinomma formicaeforme is known from both sexes. The carapace is elongate oval. The opisthosoma is covered in white plumose setae with broad black bands. In males, the dorsal scutum is black, covering the entire dorsum, but it is small in females. The opisthosoma is pear-shaped, broad and round posteriorly, with a long pedicel. The legs are dark in coloration.

== Conservation ==
Apochinomma formicaeforme is listed as Least Concern due to its wide geographical range throughout Africa. The species is conserved in several protected areas, including Ndumo Game Reserve, Tembe Elephant Park and Ophathe Game Reserve.

== Taxonomy ==
Apochinomma formicaeforme was originally described by Pietro Pavesi in 1881 from Mozambique. The species was redescribed by Haddad in 2013 and is the type species of the genus Apochinomma.
