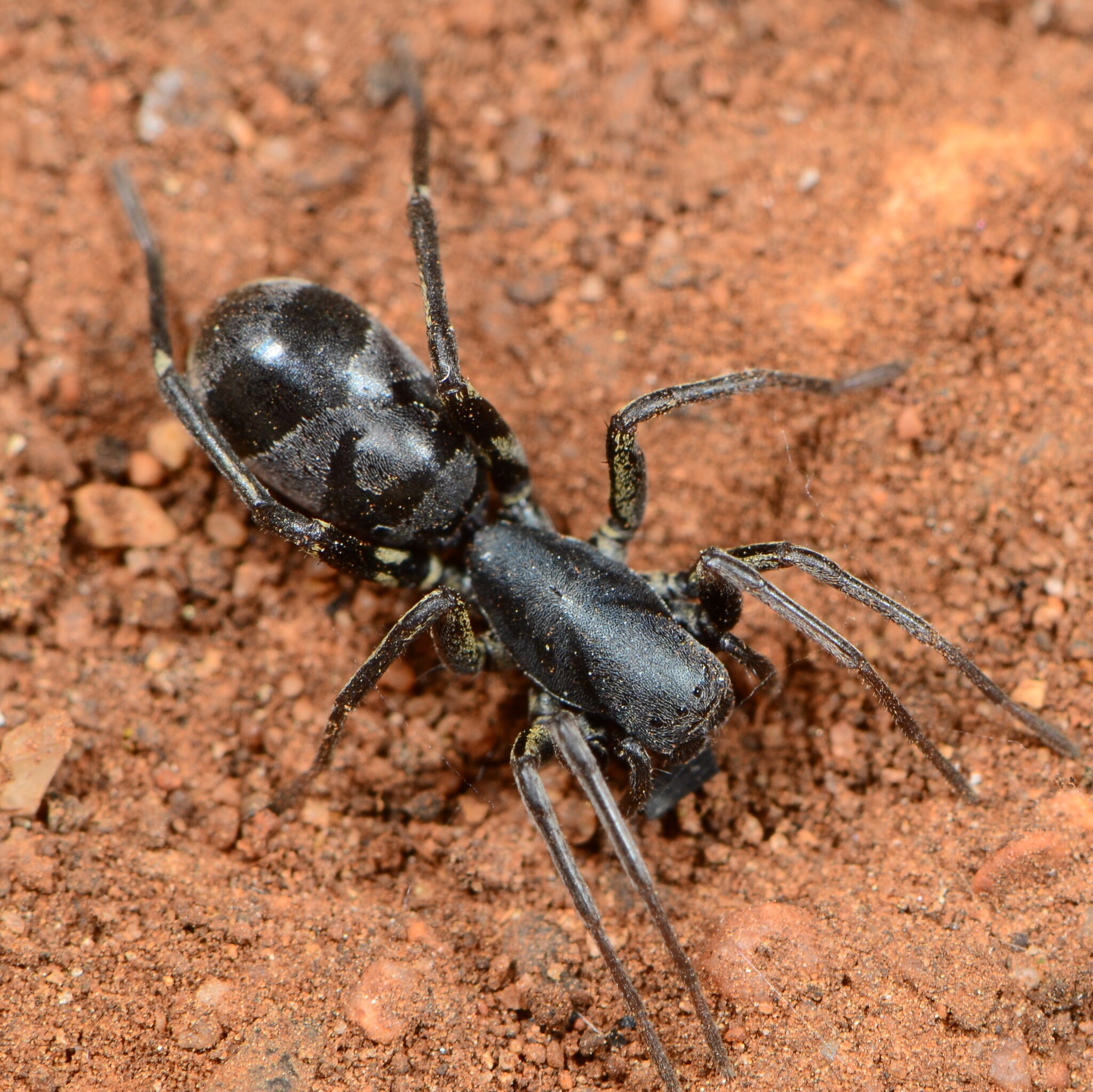
- Female
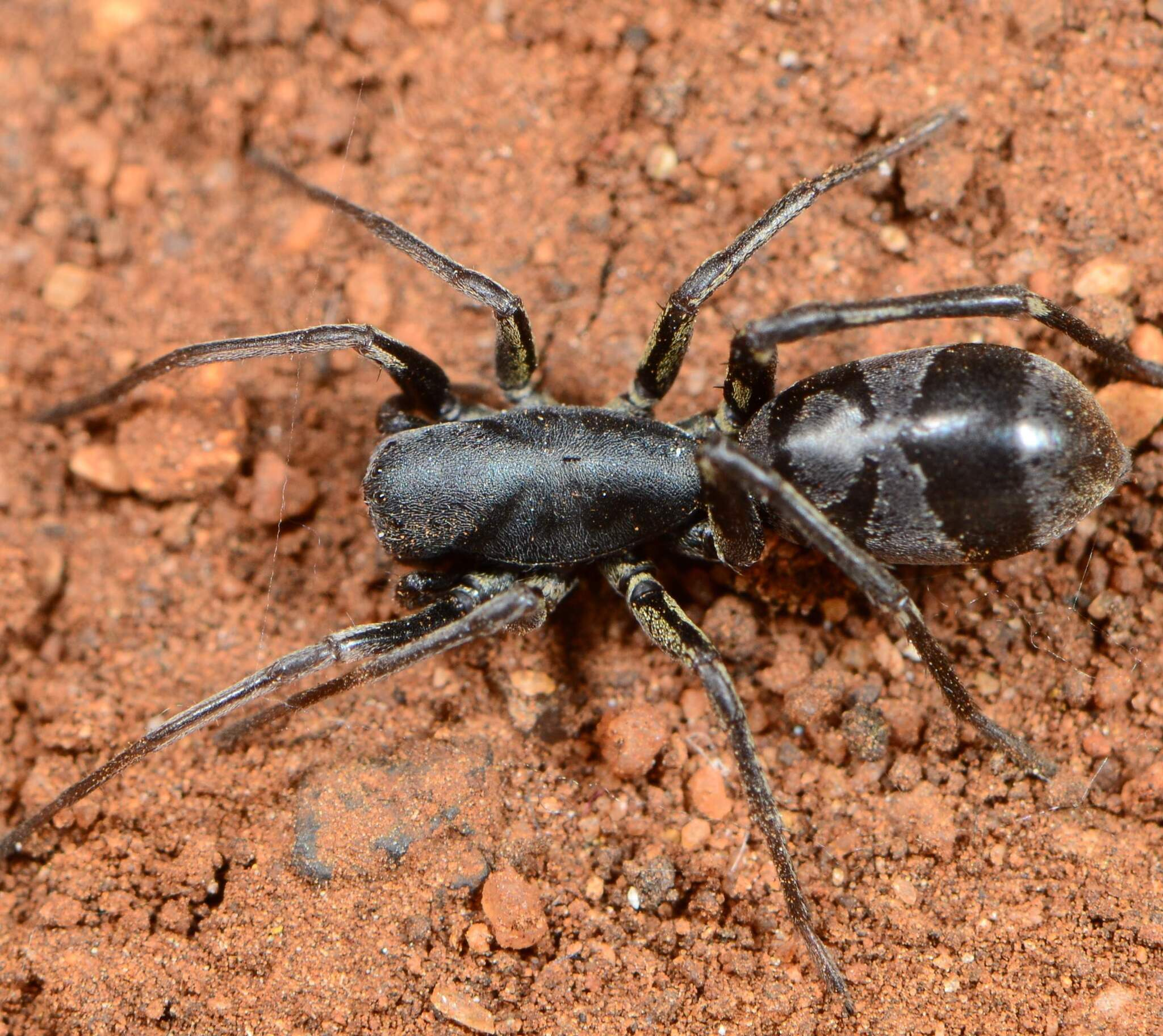
- Female

Scientific classification
- Kingdom: Animalia
- Phylum: Arthropoda
- Subphylum: Chelicerata
- Class: Arachnida
- Order: Araneae
- Infraorder: Araneomorphae
- Family: Corinnidae
- Genus: Merenius
- Species: M. alberti

Binomial name
- Merenius alberti Lessert, 1923

= Merenius alberti =

Albert's ant-like sac spider

Species of spider

Merenius alberti is a spider species in the family Corinnidae. It is commonly known as Albert's ant-like sac spider.

== Distribution ==
Merenius alberti occurs in southern Africa, including Mozambique, Zimbabwe, Eswatini and South Africa. In South Africa, the species is widespread, occurring in Eastern Cape, Gauteng, KwaZulu-Natal, Limpopo, Mpumalanga, North West and Western Cape.

== Habitat and ecology ==
This species is an exclusive ground-dwelling spider that has mainly been collected by pitfall traps, litter sifting or by hand from the soil surface, under rocks and logs. It has been sampled in leaf litter from the Forest, Grassland, Indian Ocean Coastal Belt, Savanna and Thicket biomes at altitudes ranging from 4 to 1,693 m above sea level.

Merenius alberti is polymorphic, with a widespread black morph that has creamy-white to silvery-grey markings and is a generalized mimic of black ground-dwelling ants such as Camponotus cinctellus, while the red morph mimics Anoplolepis custodiens ants. Females construct egg sacs on the underside of dead leaves, rocks and logs on the ground, with sacs having a basal plate and dome-shaped cover of papery silk, approximately 7.5 mm in diameter and containing 17–26 eggs. It is a typical generalist predator, feeding on crickets, termites, ants, flies and other spiders.

== Conservation ==
Merenius alberti is listed as Least Concern by the South African National Biodiversity Institute due to its wide geographical range. The species is protected in more than 10 protected areas. There are no known threats to the species.

== Taxonomy ==
The species was originally described by Roger de Lessert in 1923 from Umbilo near Durban. It was redescribed by Haddad & Louw (2012) and is known from both sexes.
