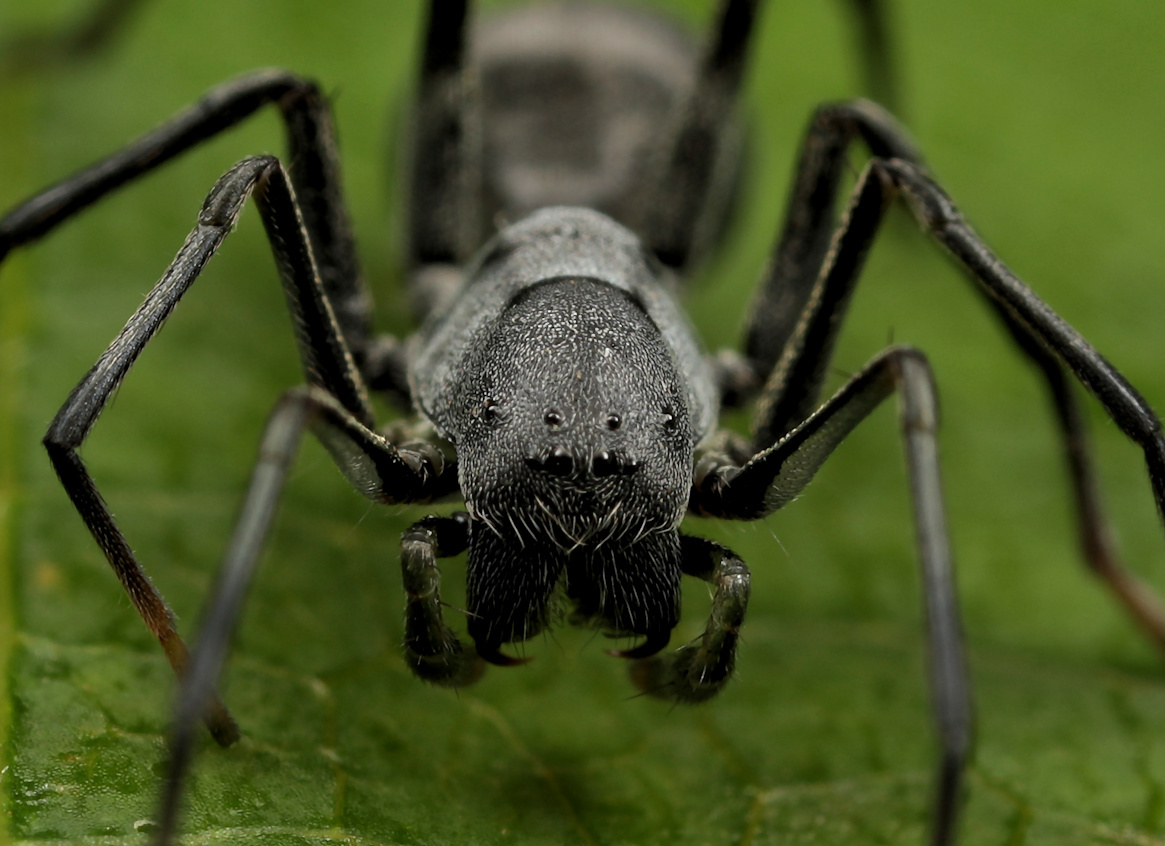
- Female A. elongatum
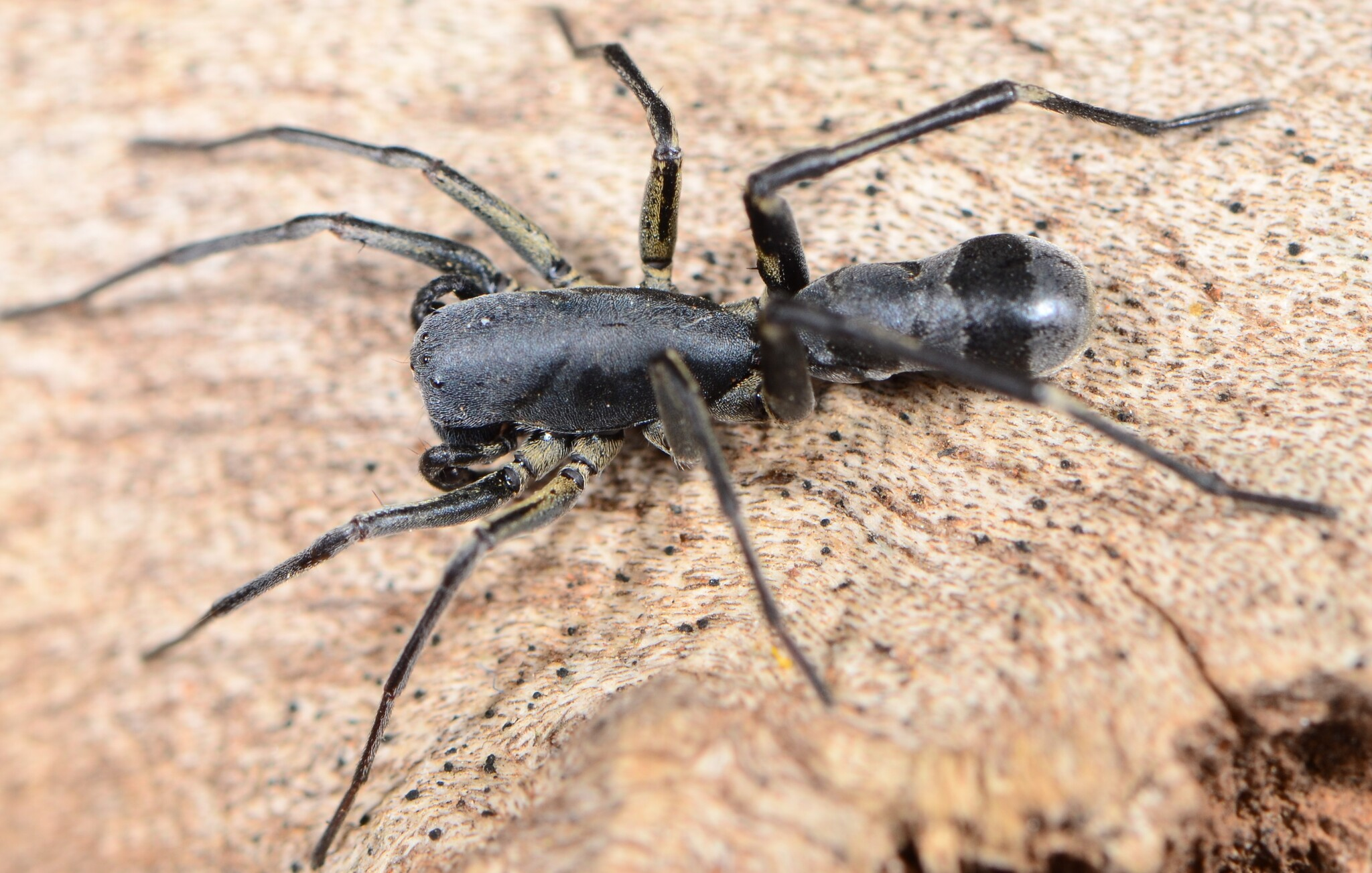
- A. formicaeforme

Scientific classification
- Kingdom: Animalia
- Phylum: Arthropoda
- Subphylum: Chelicerata
- Class: Arachnida
- Order: Araneae
- Infraorder: Araneomorphae
- Family: Corinnidae
- Genus: Apochinomma; Pavesi, 1881

Type species
- A. formicaeforme Pavesi, 1881

Species
- 16, see text

= Apochinomma =

Genus of spiders

Apochinomma is a genus of corinnid sac spiders first described by Pietro Pavesi in 1881.

== Distribution ==
Spiders in this genus are found in Africa, Asia and Brazil.

== Name ==
The genus name is grammatically neutral, as it is coined after Corinnomma, which itself is a combination of Corinna and Ancient Greek ὄμμα (omma, "eye"), which is neutral in Greek.

== Species ==
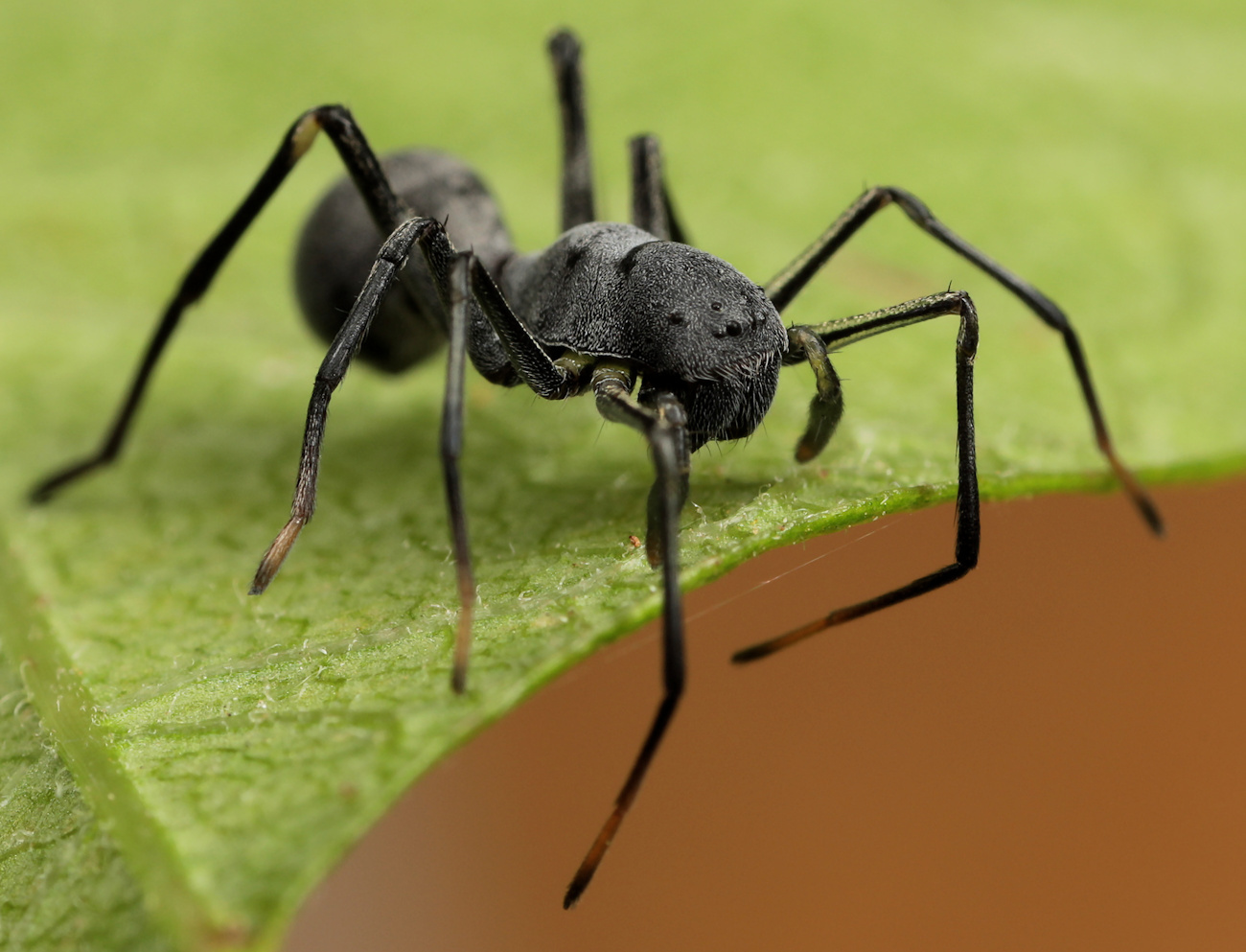
A. formicaeforme

As of September 2025 it contains eleven species:

- Apochinomma armatum Mello-Leitão, 1922 – Brazil
- Apochinomma constrictum Simon, 1896 – Brazil
- Apochinomma deceptum Haddad, 2013 – Mozambique, South Africa
- Apochinomma dolosum Simon, 1897 – India
- Apochinomma elongatum Haddad, 2013 – Tanzania, Malawi, Botswana
- Apochinomma formicaeforme Pavesi, 1881 (type) – West, Central, East, Southern Africa
- Apochinomma malkini Haddad, 2013 – Nigeria
- Apochinomma medog Zhang & Zhang, 2023 – China
- Apochinomma nitidum (Thorell, 1895) – India, Myanmar, Thailand, Indonesia (Borneo, Sulawesi)
- Apochinomma parvum Haddad, 2013 – Guinea
- Apochinomma pyriforme (Keyserling, 1891) – Brazil

Several species were transferred to other genera, such as Mazax, Myrmecotypus and Castianeira.
