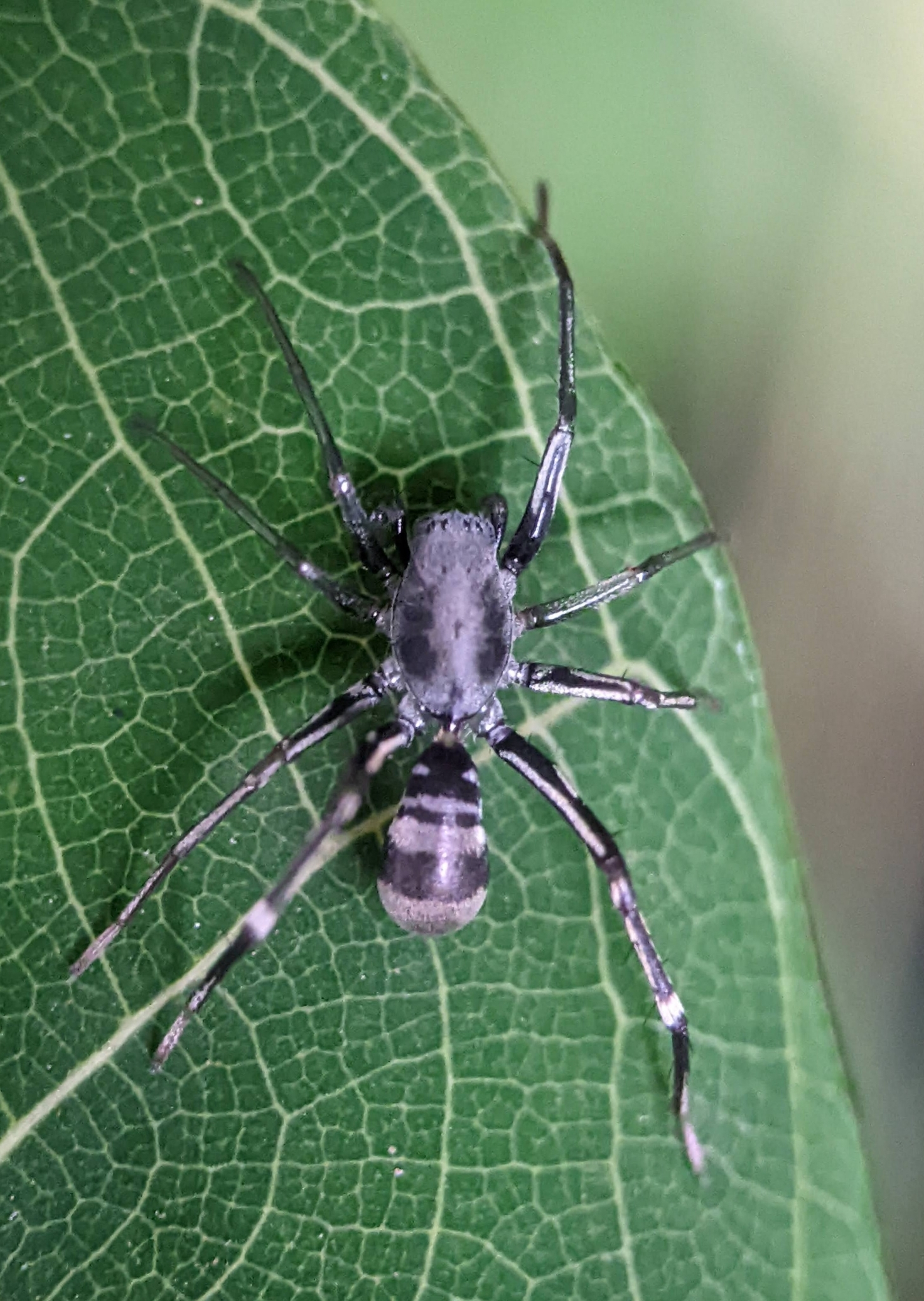
- C. severum in Singapore

Scientific classification
- Kingdom: Animalia
- Phylum: Arthropoda
- Subphylum: Chelicerata
- Class: Arachnida
- Order: Araneae
- Infraorder: Araneomorphae
- Family: Corinnidae
- Genus: Corinnomma
- Species: C. severum

Binomial name
- Corinnomma severum (Thorell, 1877)

Synonyms
- Corinna severa Thorell, 1877; Corinnomma harmandi Simon, 1886; Castaneira himalayensis Gravely, 1931; Castianeira tiranglupa Barrion & Litsinger, 1995; Corinnomma yulinguana Barrion, Barrion-Dupo & Heong, 2013

= Corinnomma severum =

Black Corinnomma

Species of spider

Corinnomma severum is a species of spider in the family Corinnidae. It has a wide distribution across Asia, ranging from India to China, and extending through the Philippines and parts of Indonesia including Sumatra and Sulawesi.

The species was first described by Tamerlan Thorell in 1877 as Corinna severa, based on specimens collected in Celebes (now Sulawesi). It was subsequently transferred to the genus Corinnomma by Ferdinand Karsch in 1880. Over the years, several other species have been synonymized with C. severum, including Corinnomma harmandi described by Eugène Simon from Southeast Asia, Castaneira himalayensis from the Himalayas, and more recently Corinnomma yulinguana from Hainan, China.

Corinnomma severum is part of the subfamily Castianeirinae, which includes ant-mimicking spiders. Like other members of this group, it exhibits morphological adaptations that help it resemble ants, potentially providing protection from predators or allowing it to prey upon ants and other small arthropods.

== Distribution ==
The species has been recorded from India, Myanmar (Burma), Vietnam, Laos, China, the Philippines and Indonesia (Sumatra, Sulawesi).

== Description ==
According to Thorell's original description, the male spider has a total body length of approximately 10.5 mm. The cephalothorax is nearly twice as long as wide, slightly rounded at the sides, and more rounded-angular toward the posterior, with the anterior portion somewhat narrowed. The front width is about two-thirds the maximum width of the cephalothorax. The clypeus height is nearly equal to the length of the area between the median eyes.

The coloration is distinctive: the cephalothorax is black with very fine whitish-gray pubescence. The oral parts are black with black-hairy, whitish-pubescent areas. The pedipalps are mostly black with the femoral portion black. The legs are also mostly black with fine bluish-white covering, with all coxae and femora being black. The patellae and following segments of the first four pairs of legs are obscurely testaceous-brown with black lines. The abdomen is entirely black with a bluish-white pubescent belt formed just before the middle and extending above, in front, across in a black line.

The female was subsequently described by Eugène Simon in 1886 as Corinnomma harmandi from specimens collected in Cambodia and Siam (now Thailand). The female measures approximately 10 mm in length. The cephalothorax is black, subtly and uniformly rugose, with plumose hairs above and yellowish-white hairs laterally, densely covered with fulvous-olivaceous hairs. The posterior eyes are arranged in a slightly curved line, with the median eyes spaced more than twice the diameter of the lateral eyes. The abdomen is oblong, gradually thickened posteriorly and rounded, black above with a hard and rugose pale yellowish pubescence, marked with two transverse obscure olivaceous stripes. The sternum is black, rugose, and white-hairy. The legs are blackish with white and yellow hairs, particularly on the anterior femora which are broadly fulvous-banded.

== Taxonomy ==
The taxonomic history of Corinnomma severum is complex, with numerous synonymizations reflecting the wide distribution and morphological variation of the species. Recent molecular and morphological studies have helped clarify the relationships between previously described taxa, resulting in the current circumscription of the species.
