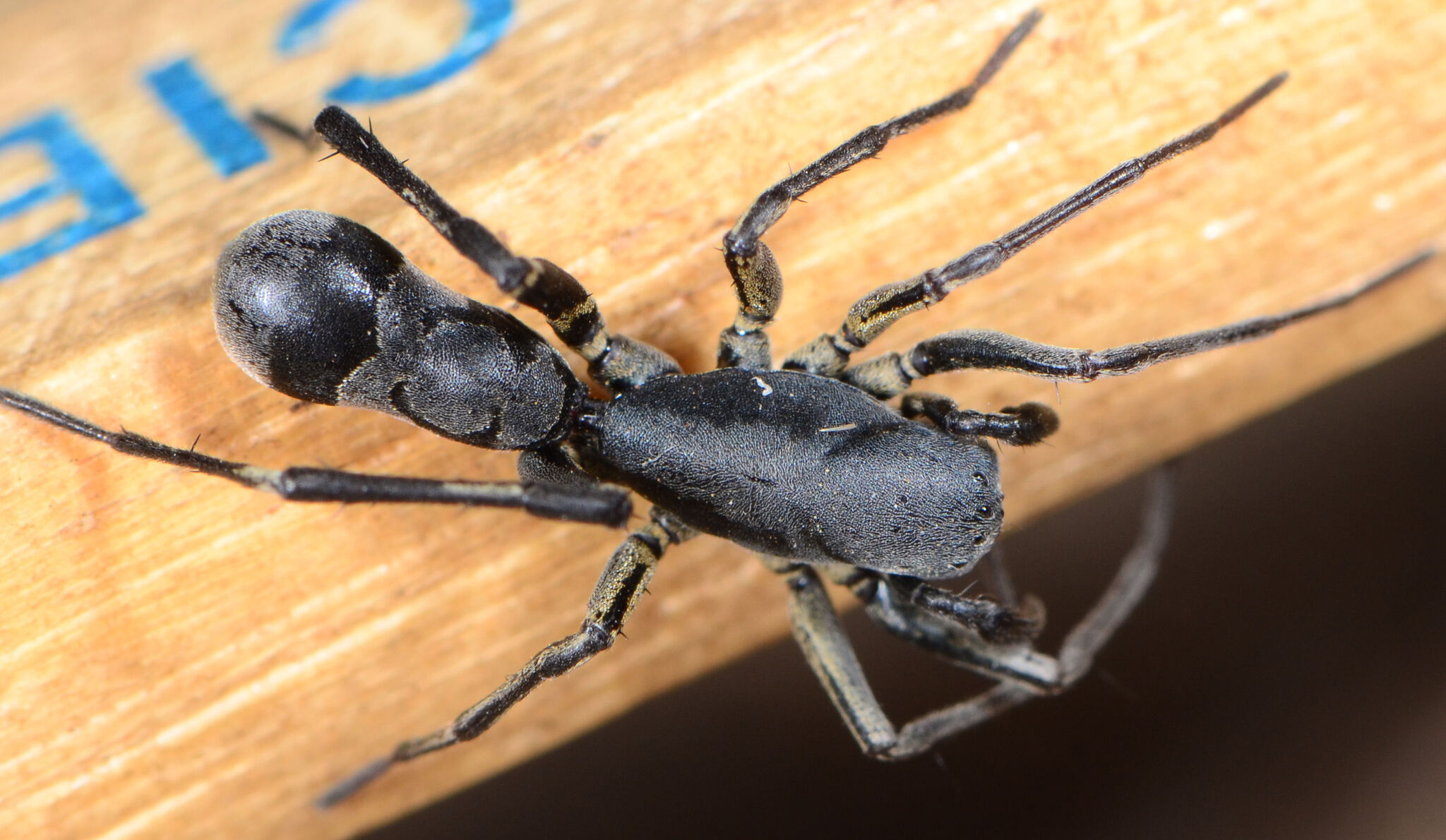
- Female
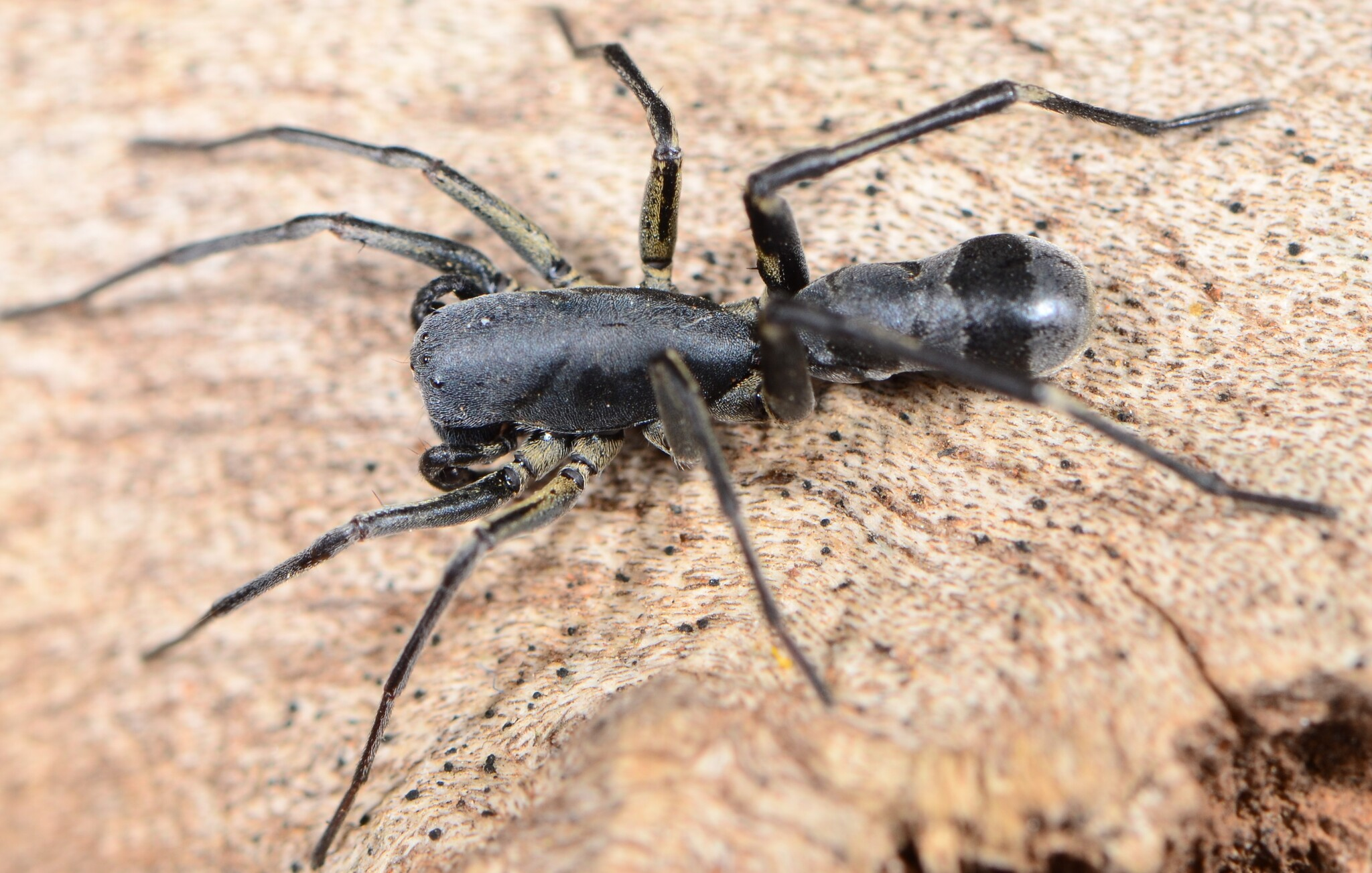
- Female

Scientific classification
- Kingdom: Animalia
- Phylum: Arthropoda
- Subphylum: Chelicerata
- Class: Arachnida
- Order: Araneae
- Infraorder: Araneomorphae
- Family: Corinnidae
- Genus: Apochinomma
- Species: A. elongatum

Binomial name
- Apochinomma elongatum Haddad, 2013

= Apochinomma elongatum =

Long Apochinomma Ant-like Sac Spider

Species of spider

Apochinomma elongatum is a species of spider in the family Corinnidae. It is known from several African countries and is commonly known as Long Apochinomma ant-like sac spider.

== Distribution ==
Apochinomma elongatum is distributed across Botswana, Malawi, Tanzania and South Africa. In South Africa, it has been recorded from Gauteng and KwaZulu-Natal provinces. The species is possibly under-collected and suspected to occur in more African countries.

== Habitat and ecology ==
The species is a free-living ground-dweller. In South Africa, it has been sampled from the Grassland and Savanna biomes. The paratype specimen recorded from Malawi is the largest African ant-mimicking corinnid, measuring 13.6 mm in total length.

== Description ==
Apochinomma elongatum is known only from the male. The carapace is elongate oval with the eye region broad, tapering posteriorly to the pedicel and broadest at the second coxa. The carapace is raised from the eye region, highest at one-third carapace length, nearly level in the midsection, with a very slight median depression, declining gradually in the posterior one-third.

The surface is finely granulate and covered in short straight white setae with sparse white feathery setae. Several long erect setae are present on the clypeus and in the eye region. The fovea is short and narrow, positioned at two-thirds carapace length. The carapace is deep red-brown with faint black striae, black mottling on clypeus, in and behind the eye region and along lateral margins. All eyes have faded black rings.

== Conservation ==
Apochinomma elongatum is listed as Least Concern due to its wide geographical range in Africa. The species is protected in Ndumo Game Reserve.

== Taxonomy ==
Apochinomma elongatum was described by species:Charles R. Haddad in 2013 based on specimens from Botswana. The records from Irene and Ndumo Game Reserve represent the first for South Africa.
