= Merenius simoni =

Conservation status
- Least Concern (SANBI Red List)

Scientific classification
- Kingdom: Animalia
- Phylum: Arthropoda
- Subphylum: Chelicerata
- Class: Arachnida
- Order: Araneae
- Infraorder: Araneomorphae
- Family: Corinnidae
- Genus: Merenius
- Species: M. simoni

Binomial name
- Merenius simoni Lessert, 1921

Species of spider

Merenius simoni is an African spider species in the family Corinnidae. It is commonly known as Simon's ant-like sac spider.

== Etymology ==
The species is named after Eugène Simon, the prominent French arachnologist.

== Distribution ==
Merenius simoni is distributed in Africa, occurring in the Democratic Republic of the Congo, Tanzania and South Africa. In South Africa, the species is known only from Limpopo Province, specifically from Lhuvhondo Nature Reserve.

== Habitat and ecology ==
This species is a ground-dwelling spider that has mainly been collected by pitfall traps, litter sifting or by hand from the soil surface. It has been sampled from the Savanna biomes at 1,341 m above sea level.

== Conservation ==
Merenius simoni is listed as Least Concern by the South African National Biodiversity Institute due to its wide geographical range in Africa. The species is protected in Lhuvhondo Nature Reserve. There are no known threats to the species.

== Taxonomy ==
The species was originally described by René de Lessert in 1921 from the Democratic Republic of the Congo. It has not been revised but is known from both sexes and was well-illustrated by Lessert (1921).
