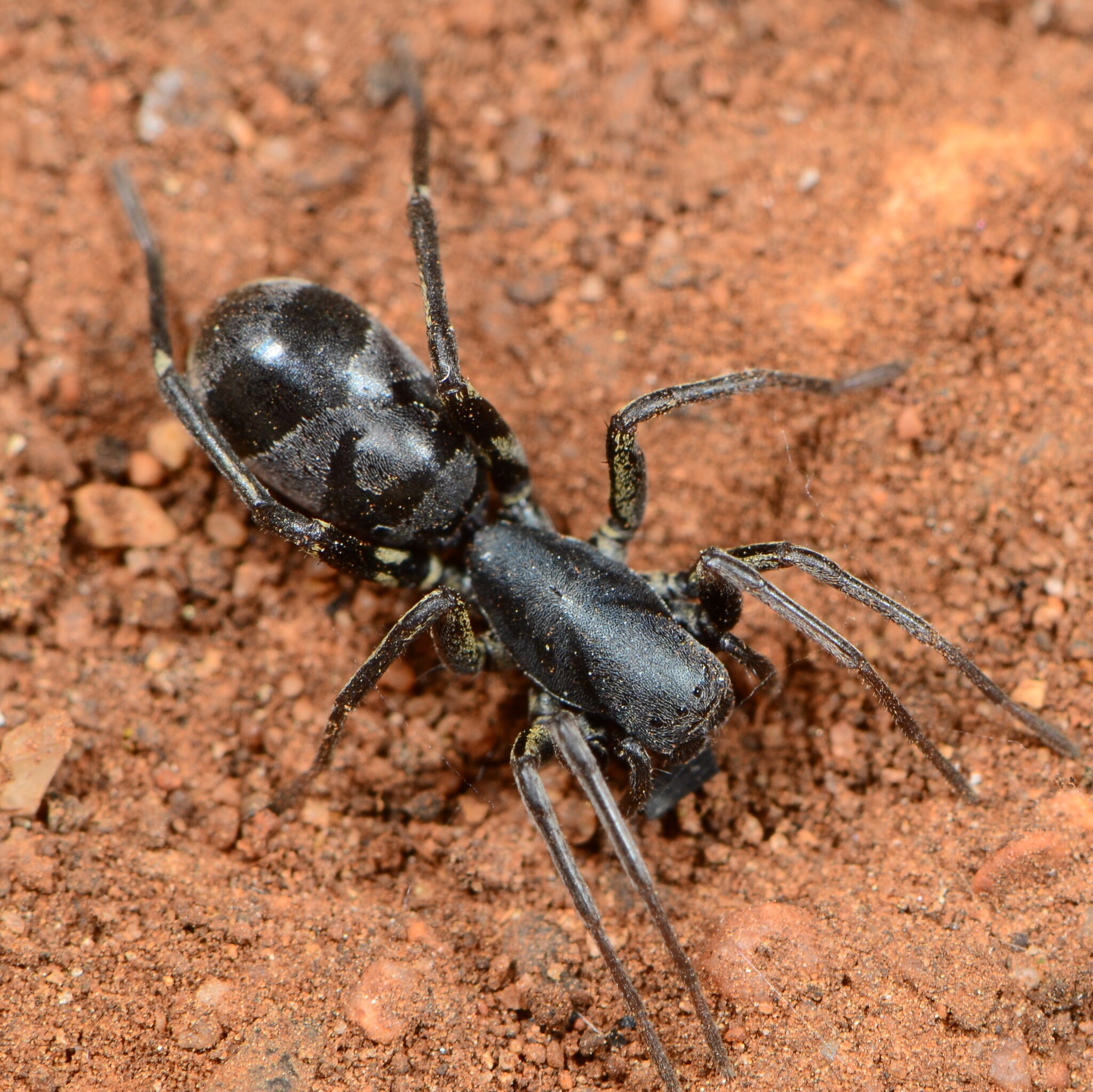
- Female M. alberti
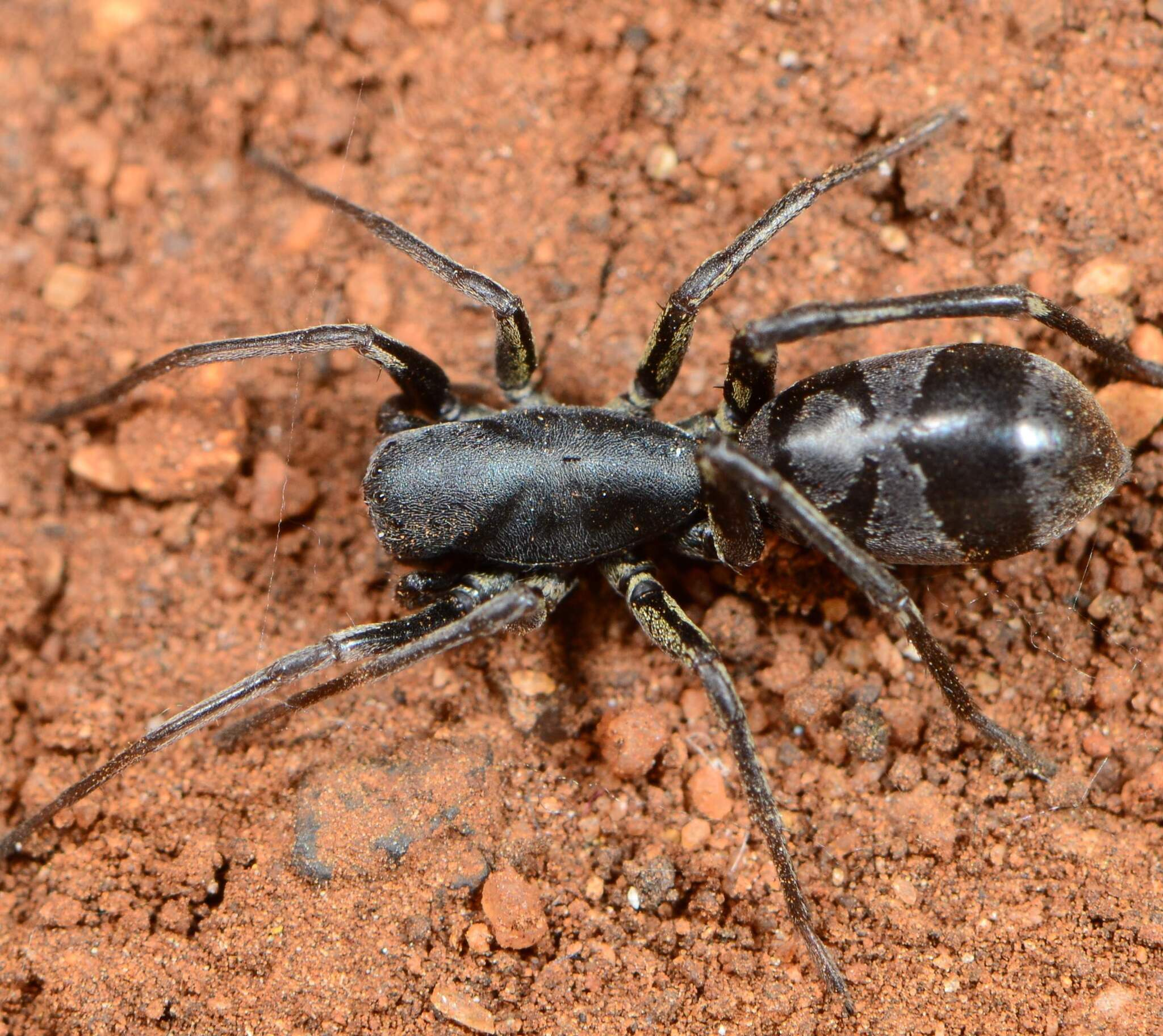
- Female M. alberti

Scientific classification
- Kingdom: Animalia
- Phylum: Arthropoda
- Subphylum: Chelicerata
- Class: Arachnida
- Order: Araneae
- Infraorder: Araneomorphae
- Family: Corinnidae
- Genus: Merenius; Simon, 1910

Type species
- M. plumosus Simon, 1910

Species
- 12, see text

= Merenius =

Genus of spiders

Merenius is a genus of corinnid sac spiders first described by Eugène Simon in 1910.

== Species ==
As of September 2025 it contains twelve species:

- Merenius alberti Lessert, 1923 – Zimbabwe, Mozambique, South Africa, Eswatini
- Merenius concolor Caporiacco, 1947 – Tanzania
- Merenius myrmex Simon, 1910 – Guinea-Bissau
- Merenius plumosus Simon, 1910 (type) – Guinea-Bissau
- Merenius proximus Lessert, 1929 – DR Congo
  - Merenius p. quadrimaculatus Lessert, 1946 – Congo
- Merenius recurvatus (Strand, 1906) – Ethiopia, East Africa
- Merenius secundus (Strand, 1907) – Tanzania
- Merenius simoni Lessert, 1921 – Congo, East Africa
- Merenius solitarius Lessert, 1946 – Congo
- Merenius tenuiculus Simon, 1910 – Sierra Leone
- Merenius yemenensis Denis, 1953 – Yemen
