= Apochinomma deceptum =

Maputaland Apochinomma ant-like sac spider

Conservation status
- Least Concern (SANBI Red List)

Scientific classification
- Kingdom: Animalia
- Phylum: Arthropoda
- Subphylum: Chelicerata
- Class: Arachnida
- Order: Araneae
- Infraorder: Araneomorphae
- Family: Corinnidae
- Genus: Apochinomma
- Species: A. deceptum

Binomial name
- Apochinomma deceptum Haddad, 2013

Synonyms
- Apochinomma decepta Haddad, 2013

Species of Arachnida

Apochinomma deceptum is a species of spider in the family Corinnidae. It is endemic to southern Africa and is commonly known as Maputaland Apochinomma ant-like sac spider.

== Distribution ==
Apochinomma deceptum is found in parts of Mozambique and South Africa. In South Africa, it has been recorded from KwaZulu-Natal and Mpumalanga provinces.

== Habitat and ecology ==
Apochinomma deceptum is a free-living ground-dweller that mimics medium to large Ponerinae ants, possibly those of genera such as Streblognatha and Pachycondyla. It is one of a number of species within the Apochinomma genus to practice this mimicry. It is usually found in habitats with extensive grasslands, particularly coastal or wetland areas within 50 metres (160 ft) of sea level, although specimens have been collected at altitudes ranging from 47 to 256 m above sea level.

== Description ==
Apochinomma deceptum displays the characteristic features of the genus, including an elongate carapace that is typically more than twice as long as wide. The species exhibits several morphological adaptations for ant mimicry, including a distinct transverse constriction near the middle of the elongate, pear-shaped opisthosoma.

The carapace is elongate oval with the eye region broad, tapering posteriorly to the pedicel and broadest at the second coxa. The surface is finely granulate and covered in short straight white setae and sparse white feathery setae, with several long erect setae on the clypeus and eye region. The carapace is dark red-brown with extensive black mottling and distinct striae. All eyes are surrounded by black rings.

The opisthosoma bears a narrow anterior black band, an n-shaped marking in the anterior half, and a broad band posterior to the constriction. The legs are slender with narrow lengthwise stripes.

== Conservation ==
Apochinomma deceptum is not thought to face any significant threats, as its range extends across two countries and within South Africa encompasses three protected areas. It is classified as Least Concern.

== Taxonomy ==
Apochinomma deceptum was described by Charles R. Haddad in 2013 from specimens collected from Tembe Elephant Park in KwaZulu-Natal. Individuals of both sexes have been found.
