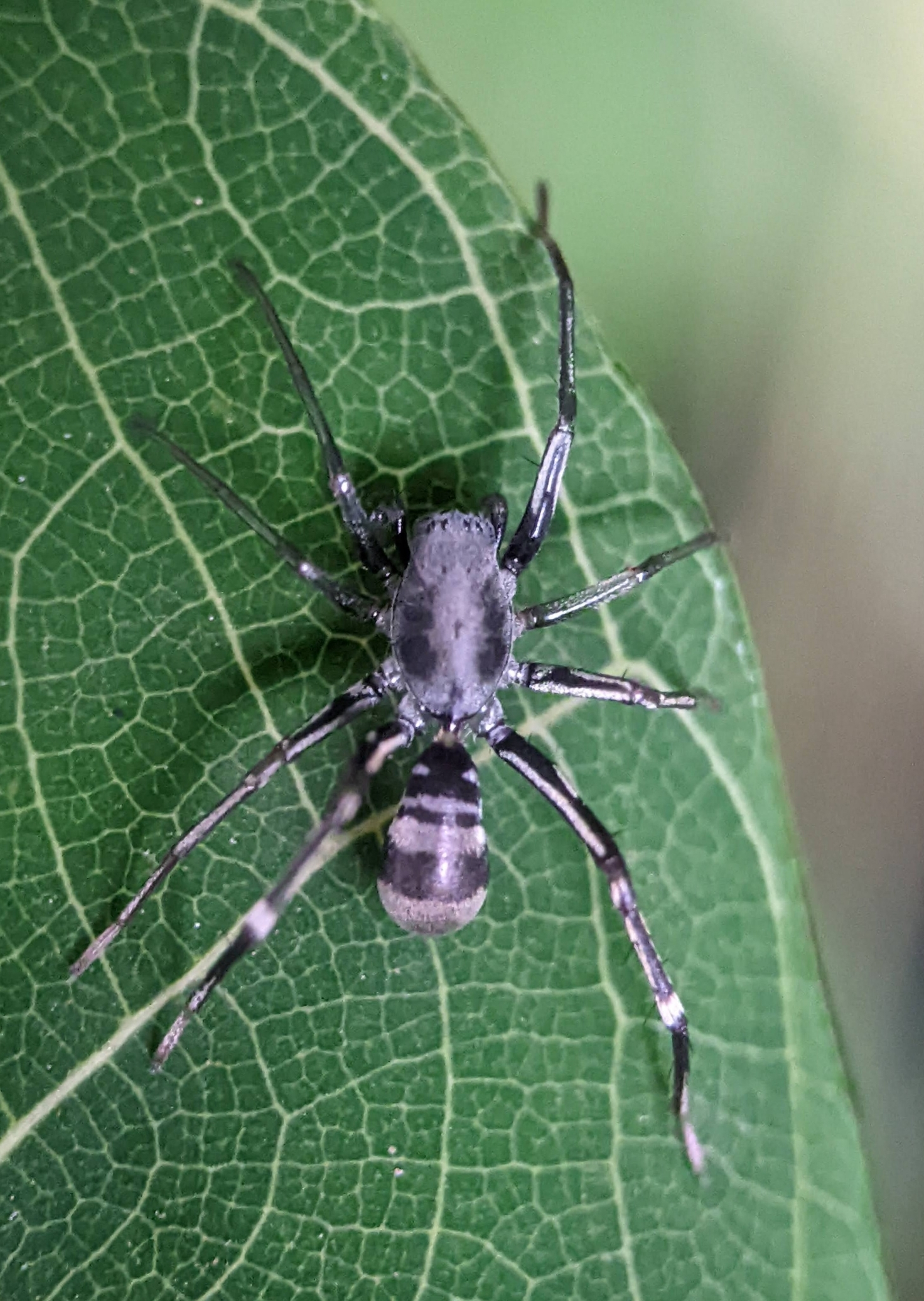
- C. severum from Singapore
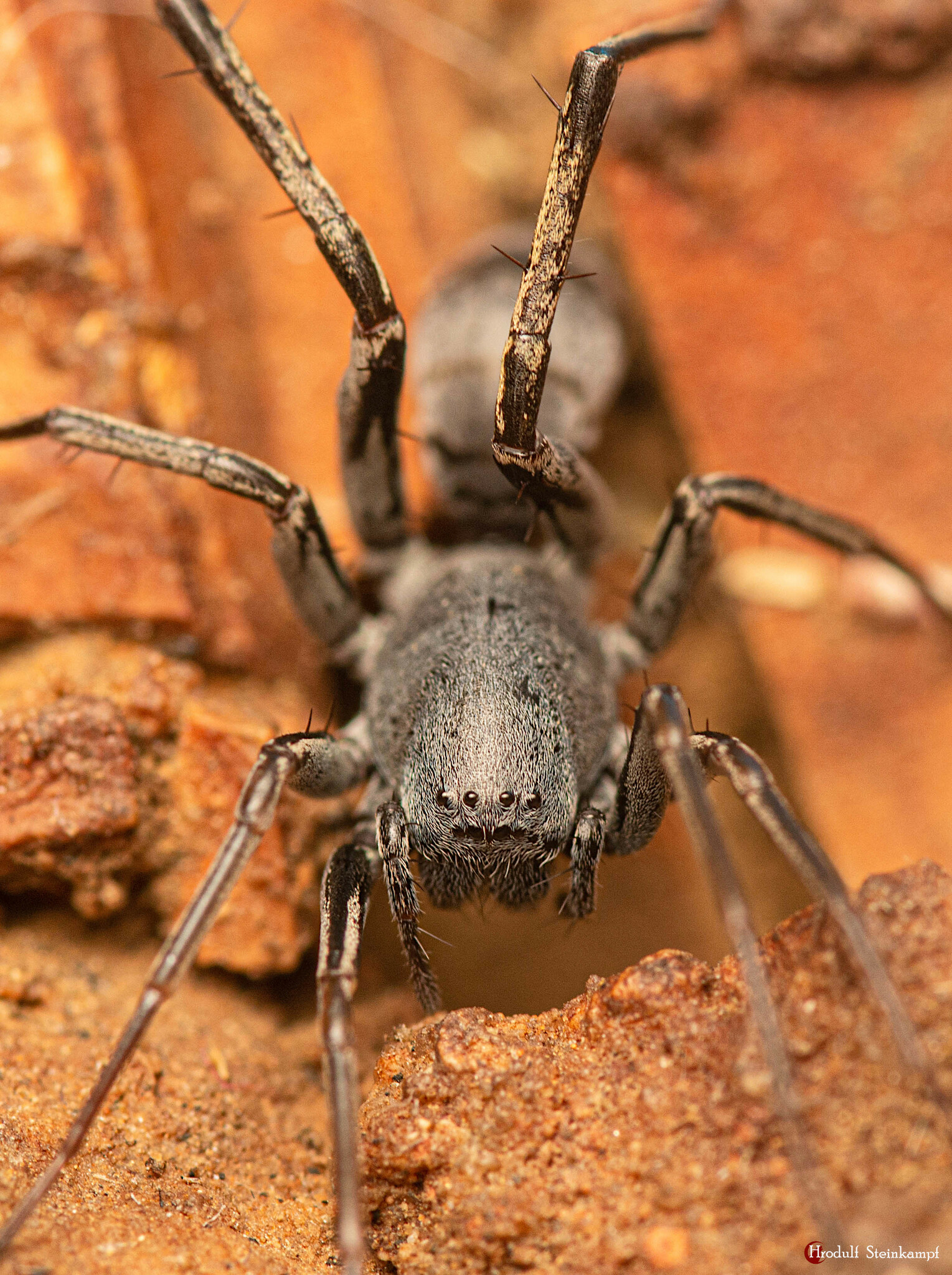
- C. semiglabrum from South Africa

Scientific classification
- Kingdom: Animalia
- Phylum: Arthropoda
- Subphylum: Chelicerata
- Class: Arachnida
- Order: Araneae
- Infraorder: Araneomorphae
- Family: Corinnidae
- Genus: Corinnomma; Karsch, 1880

Type species
- C. severum (Thorell, 1877)

Species
- 15, see text

= Corinnomma =

Genus of spiders

Corinnomma is a genus of African and Asian corinnid sac spiders first described by Ferdinand Karsch in 1880.

== Name ==
The genus name is a combination of Corinna and Ancient Greek ὄμμα (omma, "eye"), which is neutral in Greek. Hence the genus name is also neutral.

== Species ==
As of October 2025, this genus includes fifteen species:

- Corinnomma afghanicum Roewer, 1962 – Afghanistan
- Corinnomma albobarbatum Simon, 1898 – St. Vincent
- Corinnomma comulatum Thorell, 1891 – India (Nicobar Is.)
- Corinnomma hamulatum (Song & Zhu, 1992) – China
- Corinnomma javanum Simon, 1905 – Thailand, Singapore, Indonesia (Java, Borneo)
- Corinnomma lawrencei Haddad, 2006 – Tanzania, Zimbabwe, Mozambique, South Africa
- Corinnomma moerens Thorell, 1890 – Indonesia (Sumatra)
- Corinnomma olivaceum Simon, 1896 – Ethiopia
- Corinnomma plumosum (Thorell, 1881) – Indonesia (Moluccas)
- Corinnomma rapax Deeleman-Reinhold, 1993 – Indonesia (Sumatra, Borneo)
- Corinnomma semiglabrum (Simon, 1896) – Zambia, Namibia, Zimbabwe, Mozambique, South Africa, Eswatini
- Corinnomma severum (Thorell, 1877) – India to China, Philippines, Indonesia (Sumatra, Sulawesi) (type species)
- Corinnomma simplex L. Zhang, Jin & F. Zhang, 2022 – India, China
- Corinnomma spirale L. Zhang, Jin & F. Zhang, 2022 – China
- Corinnomma thorelli Simon, 1905 – Indonesia (Java)
