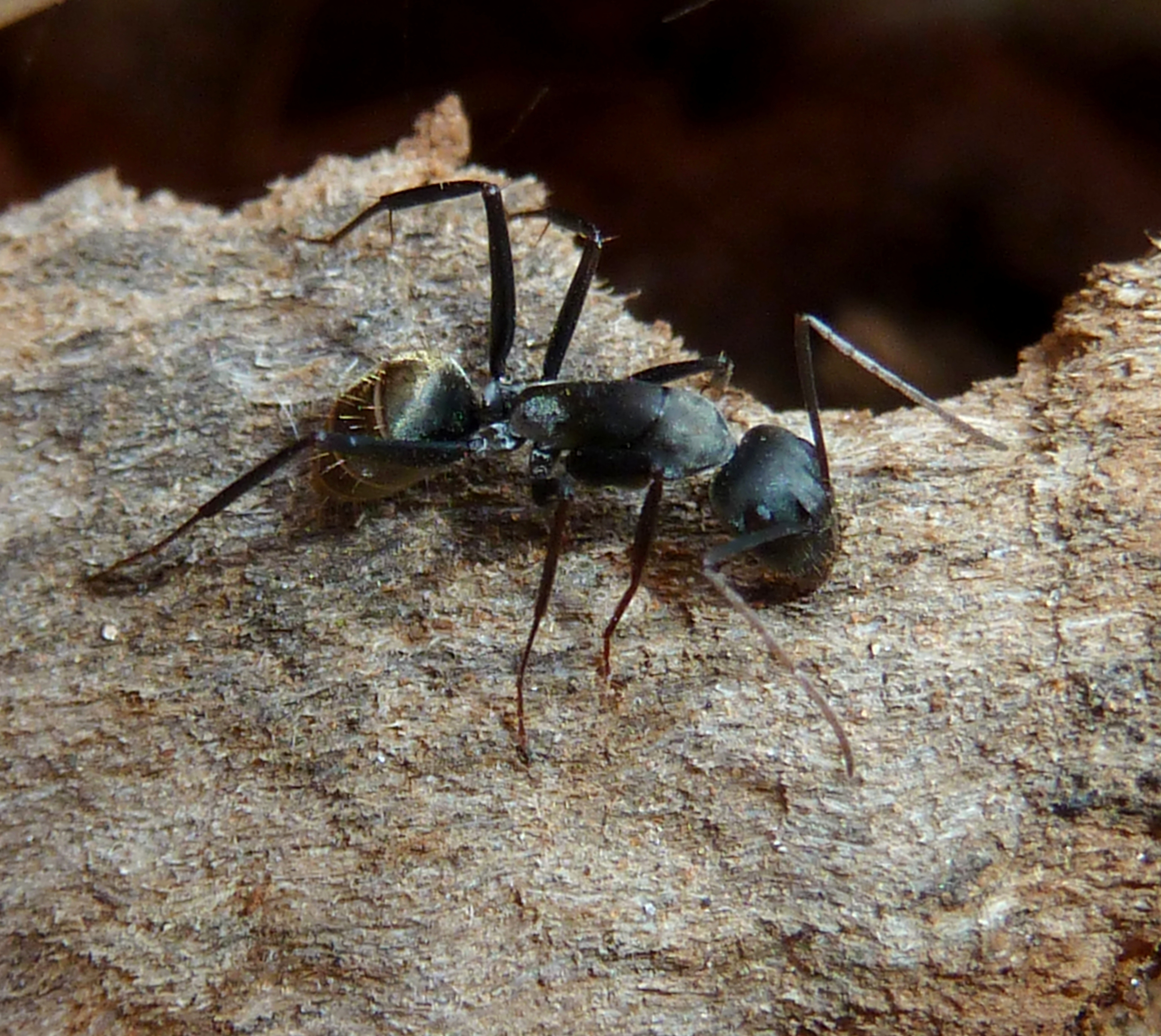

Scientific classification
- Kingdom: Animalia
- Phylum: Arthropoda
- Clade: Pancrustacea
- Class: Insecta
- Order: Hymenoptera
- Family: Formicidae
- Subfamily: Formicinae
- Genus: Camponotus
- Subgenus: Myrmosericus
- Species: C. cinctellus

Binomial name
- Camponotus cinctellus (Gerstaecker, 1859)

Synonyms
- C. venustus Mayr, 1867

= Camponotus cinctellus =

Shiny sugar ant

Species of carpenter ant known as the shiny sugar ant

Camponotus cinctellus, commonly known as the shiny sugar ant, is a species of sugar ant with an extensive range in the eastern Afrotropics.

== Description ==
The somewhat shimmering, golden-hued pubescence of the gaster is characteristic of all the worker castes. On the gaster, erect bristles are limited to the posterior segments. The reddish leg colour distinguishes it from the similar but smaller C. sericeus.

== Range ==
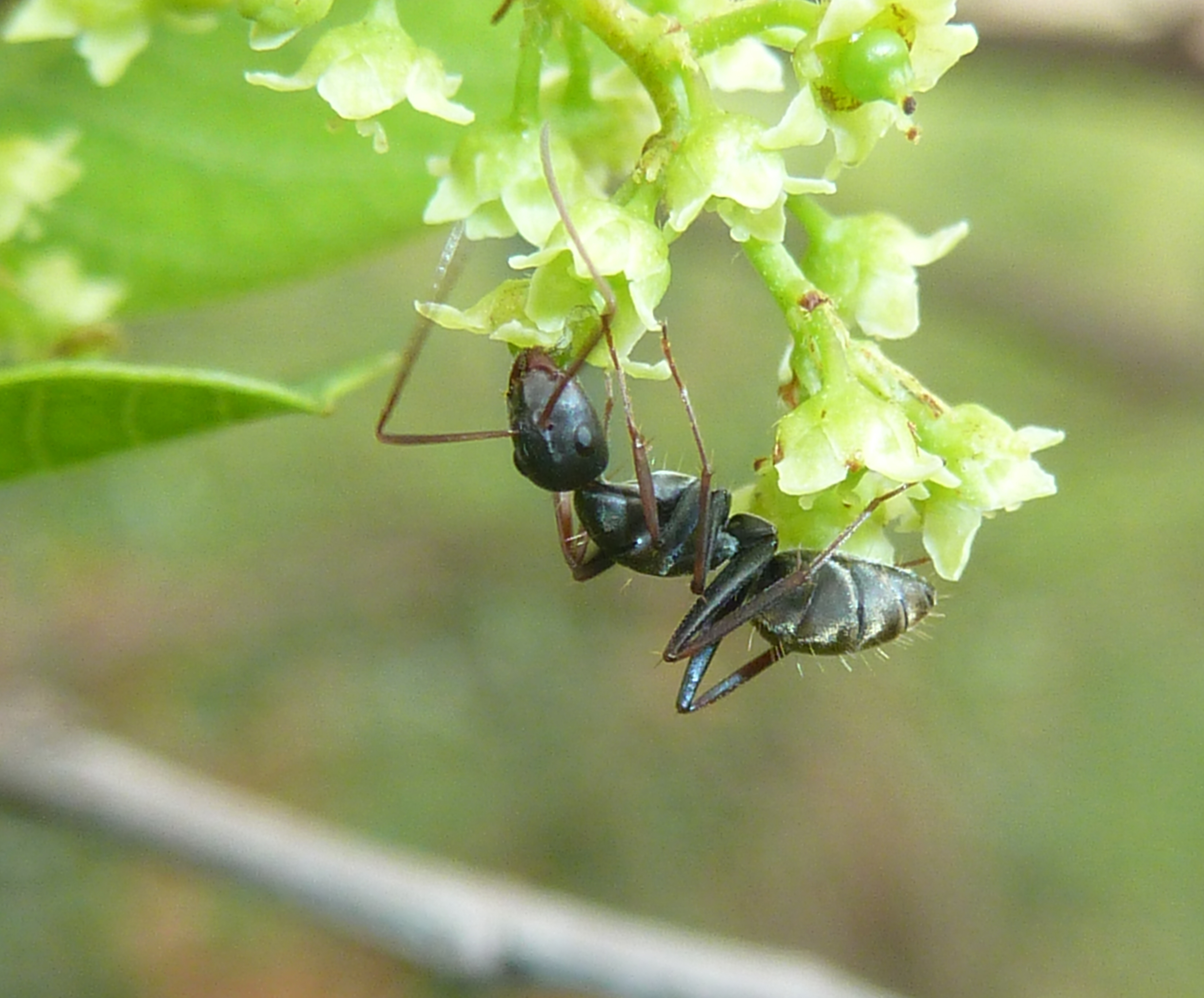
Feeding on nectar

It is native to eastern Africa from Eritrea to Kenya, Rwanda, the DRC, Tanzania, Mozambique, Zimbabwe and South Africa, as far south as coastal Transkei.

== Subspecies ==
Two subspecies are recognized:

- C. c. cinctellus – type locality in Mozambique
- C. c. belliceps Santschi, 1939 – type locality in the DRC
