= Pietro Pavesi =

Italian naturalist and politician (1844–1907)

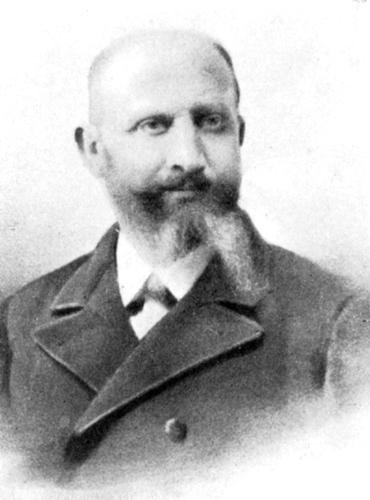

Pietro Pavesi (24 September 1844 – 31 August 1907) was an Italian professor of zoology at the University of Pavia. He also served as a mayor of Pavia from 1899 to 1902.

Pavesi was born in Pavia to calligraphist Carlo Giuseppe and Luigia née Farina. He studied natural sciences at the University of Pavia, graduating in 1865. He then taught natural history at the University of Naples until 1871 at the Canton High School in Lugano where he also founded a natural history cabinet. He then taught comparative anatomy at the University of Napes (serving alongside Paolo Pancer), in 1872 he moved to Genoa and in 1875 to Pavia. He worked on the fauna of Ticino Canton, especially the fish and arachnids. In 1899 he became a mayor of Pavia and continued to hold the position until 1902, representing a laicist position. he died at Asso in Lombardy from pneumonia.
