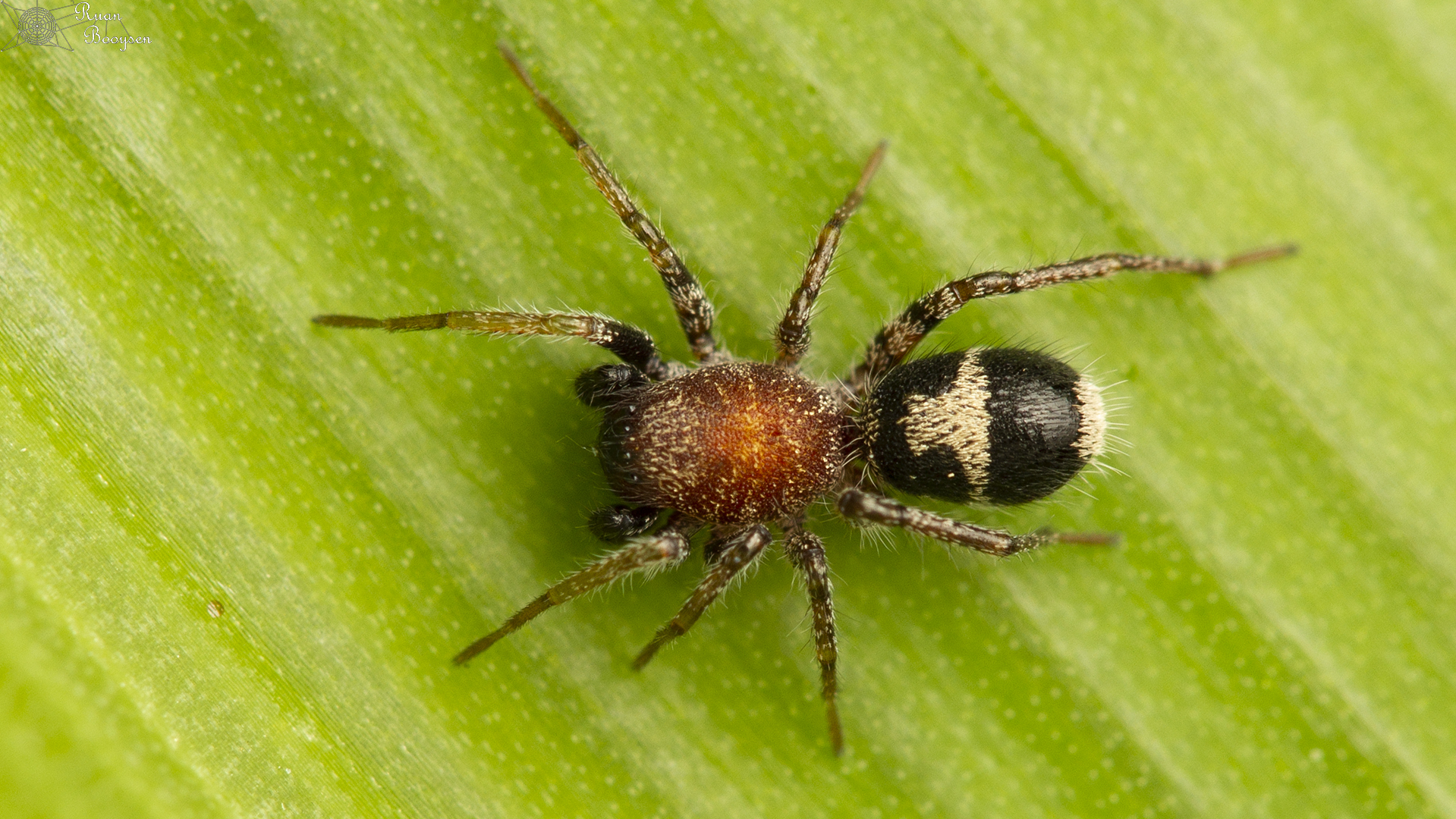

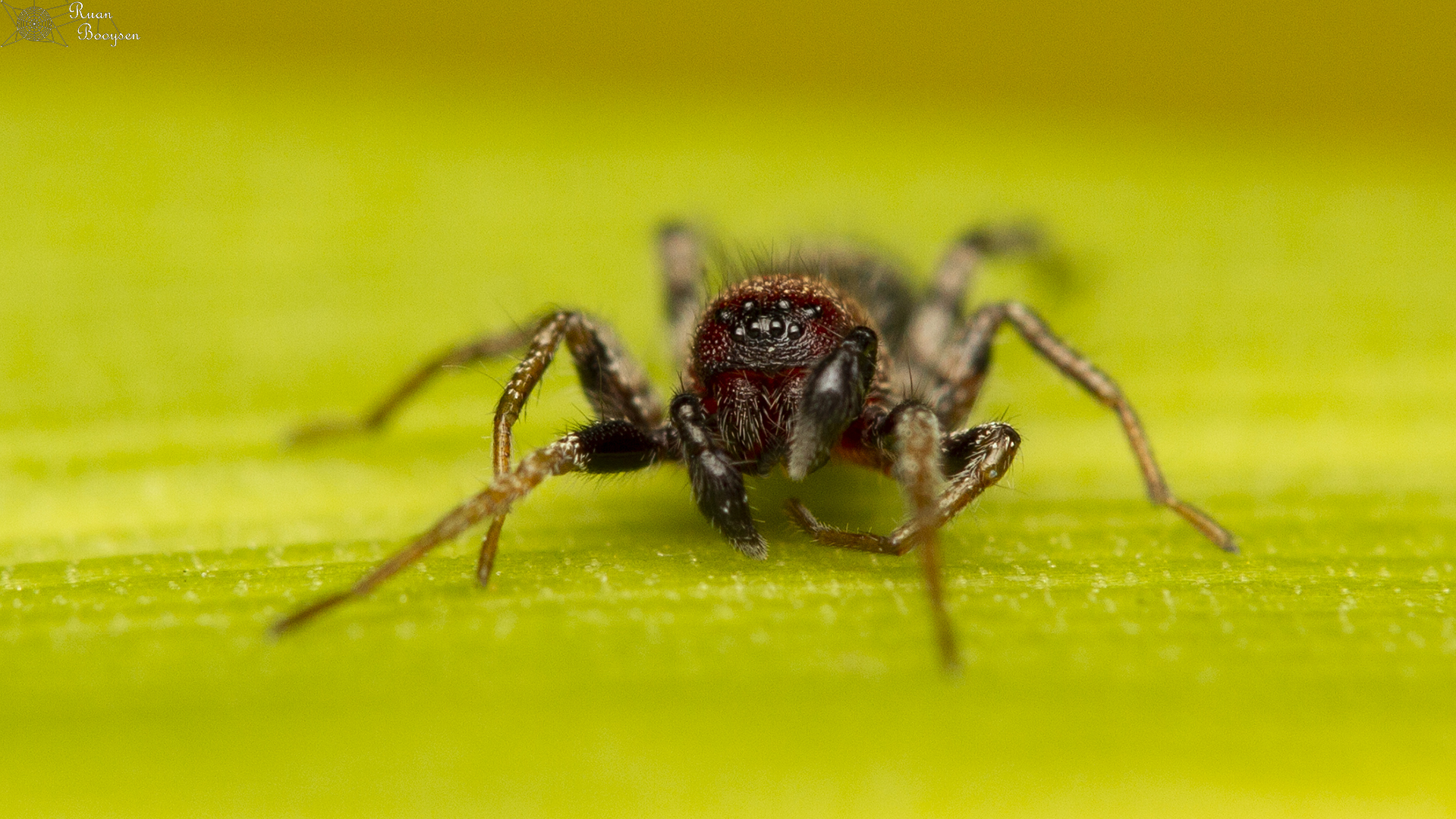

Scientific classification
- Kingdom: Animalia
- Phylum: Arthropoda
- Subphylum: Chelicerata
- Class: Arachnida
- Order: Araneae
- Infraorder: Araneomorphae
- Family: Corinnidae
- Genus: Coenoptychus
- Species: C. mutillicus

Binomial name
- Coenoptychus mutillicus (Haddad, 2004)

Synonyms
- Graptartia mutillica Haddad, 2004

= Coenoptychus mutillicus =

Elegant Dwarf Mutilliform Sac Spider

Species of spider

Coenoptychus mutillicus is a species of spider in the family Corinnidae. It is distributed across multiple African countries and is commonly known as elegant dwarf mutilliform sac spider.

== Distribution ==
Coenoptychus mutillicus is distributed across Lesotho, Botswana, Burkina Faso, Cameroon, Kenya, Ethiopia, Ivory Coast, Nigeria, South Africa, Tanzania and Zimbabwe. In South Africa, the species is known from six of the nine provinces at altitudes ranging from 93 to 1,951 m above sea level.

== Habitat and ecology ==
The species is known from a variety of habitats but appears to prefer the grassland and savanna biomes. It is usually collected in pitfall traps and leaf litter, or under prone objects where it shelters when not active. These objects include stones, dry cattle dung pads, logs, and in abandoned mounds of the snouted harvester termite, Trinervitermes trinervoides. From crops it was also sampled from maize fields.

Coenoptychus mutillicus is a free-living ground-dweller that resembles the wingless females of smaller genera of velvet ants (Hymenoptera: Mutillidae).

== Description ==
Coenoptychus mutillicus is known from both sexes. It shares the general morphological characteristics of the genus Coenoptychus, including the gradually raised carapace, granular surface texture, and the distinctive geometrical markings created by creamy-white feathery setae on the opisthosoma.

== Conservation ==
Coenoptychus mutillicus is listed as Least Concern due to its wide geographical range. The species is recorded from several protected areas.

== Taxonomy ==
Coenoptychus mutillicus was originally described as Graptartia mutillica by Charles R. Haddad in 2004 from the Deelhoek Farm near Bloemfontein in the Free State. The species was transferred to Coenoptychus by Paul et al. in 2018.
