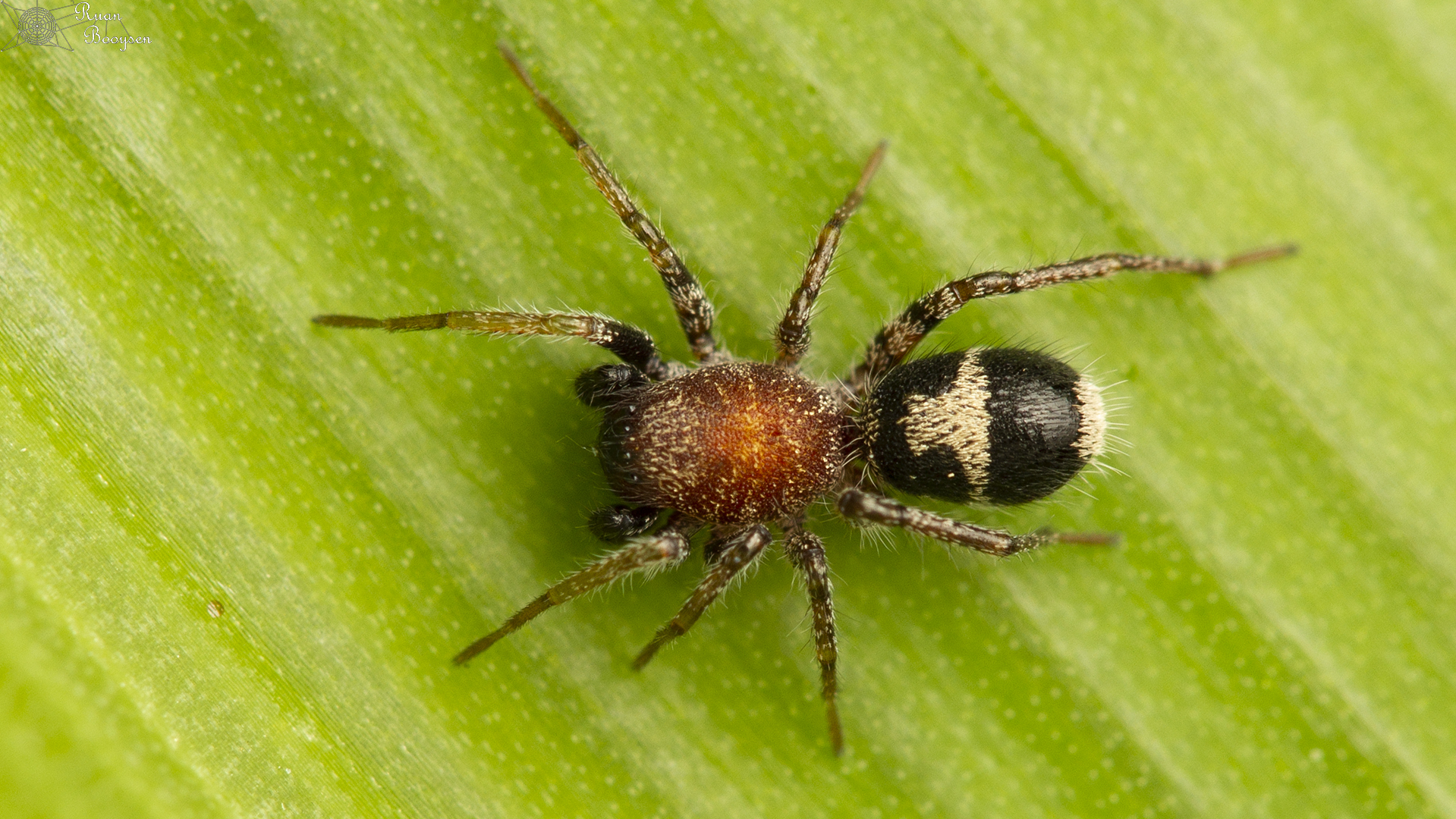
- C. mutillicus
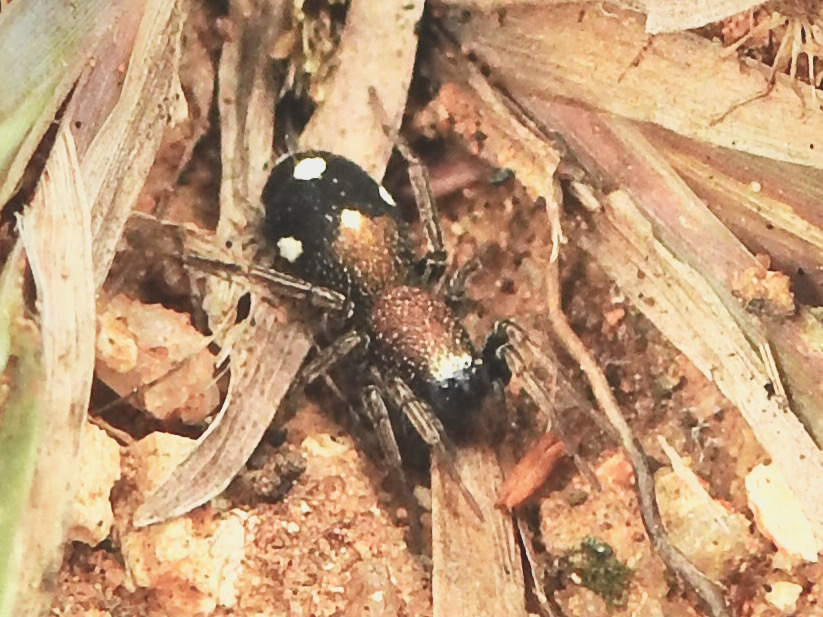
- C. pulcher

Scientific classification
- Kingdom: Animalia
- Phylum: Arthropoda
- Subphylum: Chelicerata
- Class: Arachnida
- Order: Araneae
- Infraorder: Araneomorphae
- Family: Corinnidae
- Genus: Coenoptychus; Simon, 1885

Type species
- C. pulcher Simon, 1885

Species
- 3, see text

= Coenoptychus =

Genus of spiders

Coenoptychus is a genus of African and Asian corinnid sac spiders first described by Eugène Simon in 1885. It contains three species, two of which were transferred from Graptartia in 2018.

== Description ==
The carapace is gradually raised towards the rear, highest at approximately two-thirds its length. The surface is granular with long straight and short feathery setae scattered throughout. The fovea is broad and indistinct, slightly posterior to the midpoint of the carapace. The carapace is deep orange to reddish-brown to dark brown throughout, with brown rings present around the eyes.

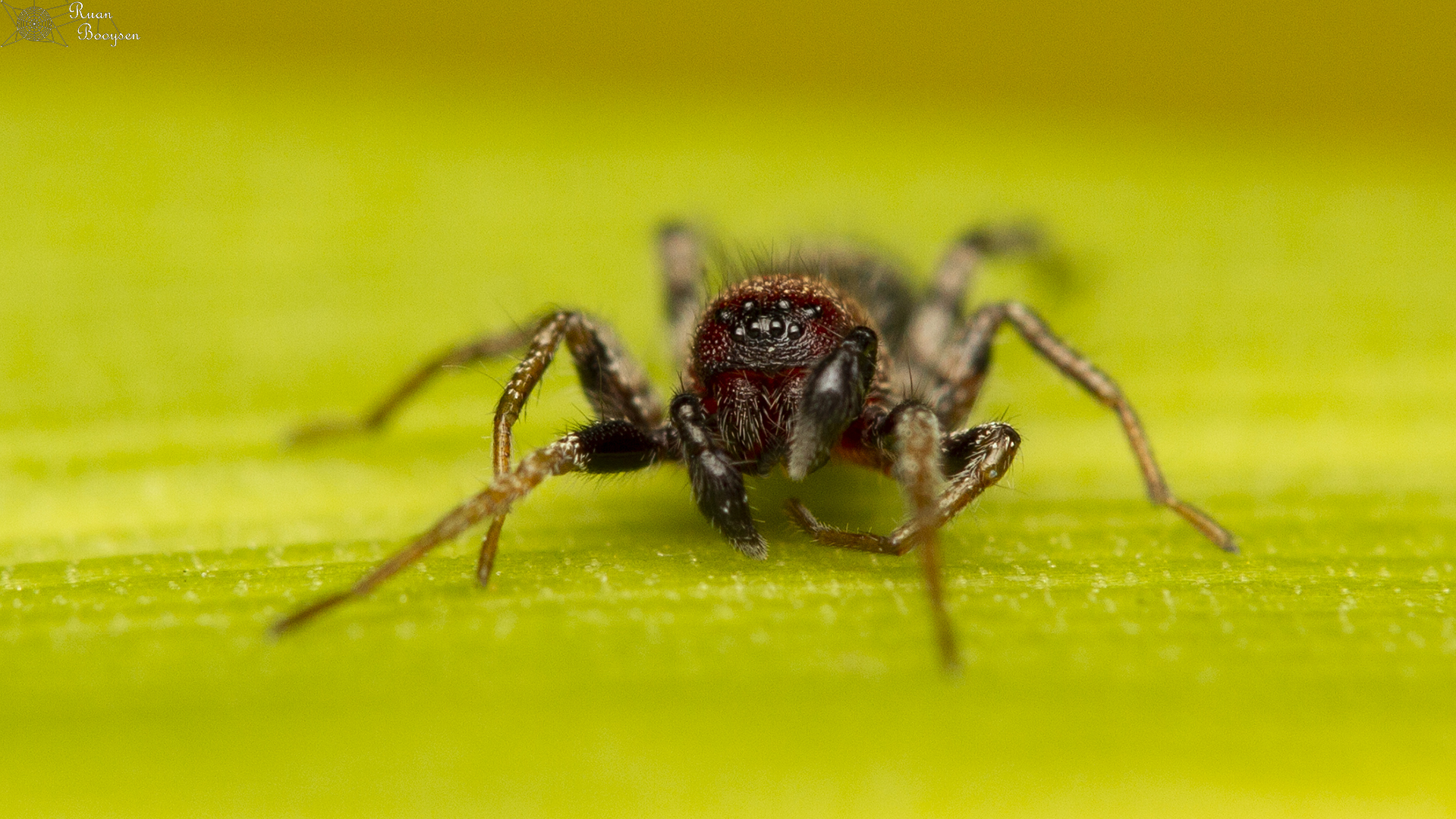
Front view of C. mutillicus

The anterior eye row is strongly procurved, while the posterior row is slightly recurved. The eyes are subequal in size. The opisthosoma is oval with a large dorsal scutum. The dorsum has a black undertone and is covered with short, black feathery setae and long erect straight setae. Creamy-white feathery setae make intricate geometrical markings on the abdomen.

The legs are orange-brown with black bands on the femora and are densely covered in creamy-white feathery setae. The genitalic plate of females is heavily sclerotized. Males are smaller and more slender than females.

== Species ==
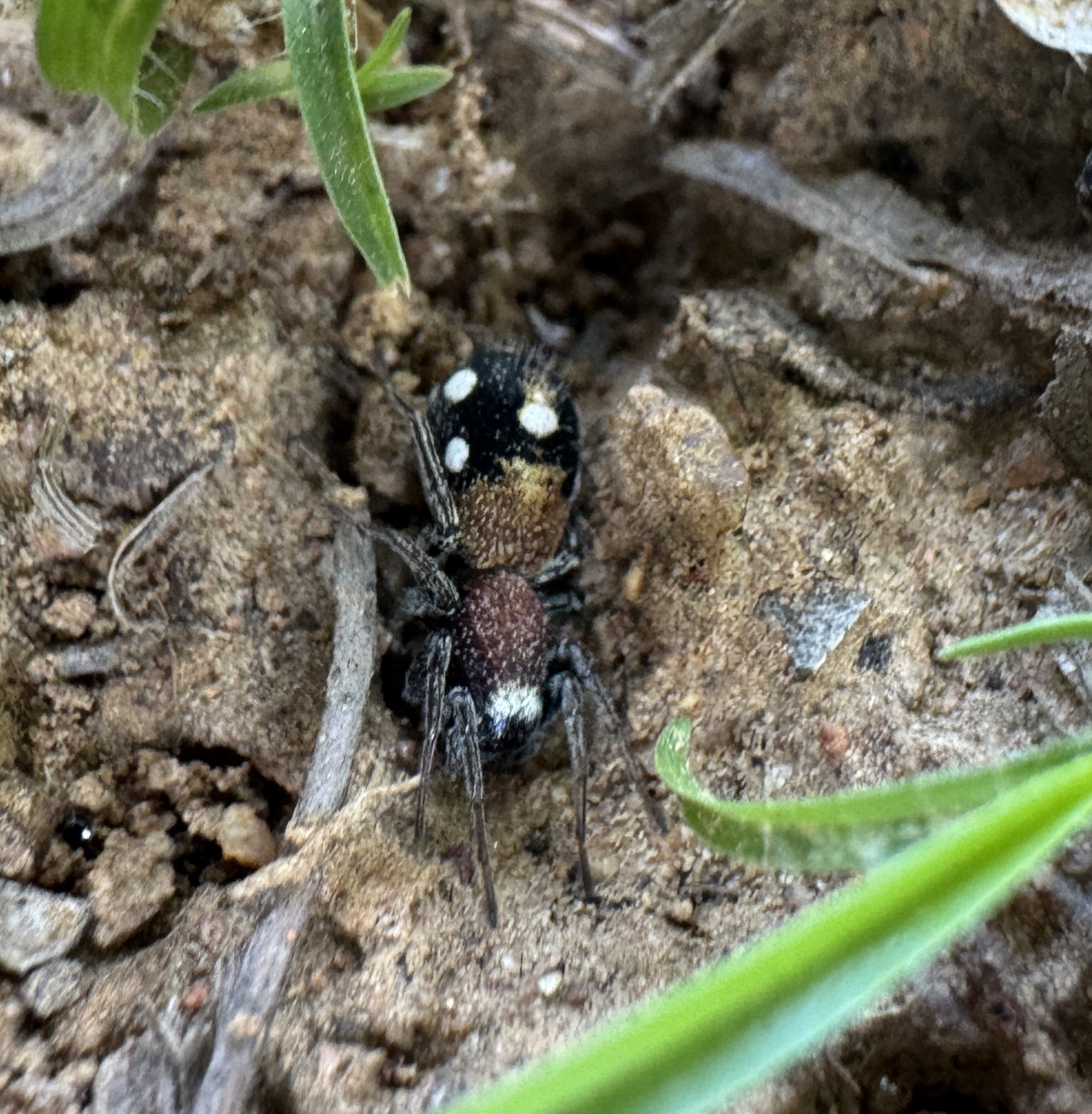
C. pulcher

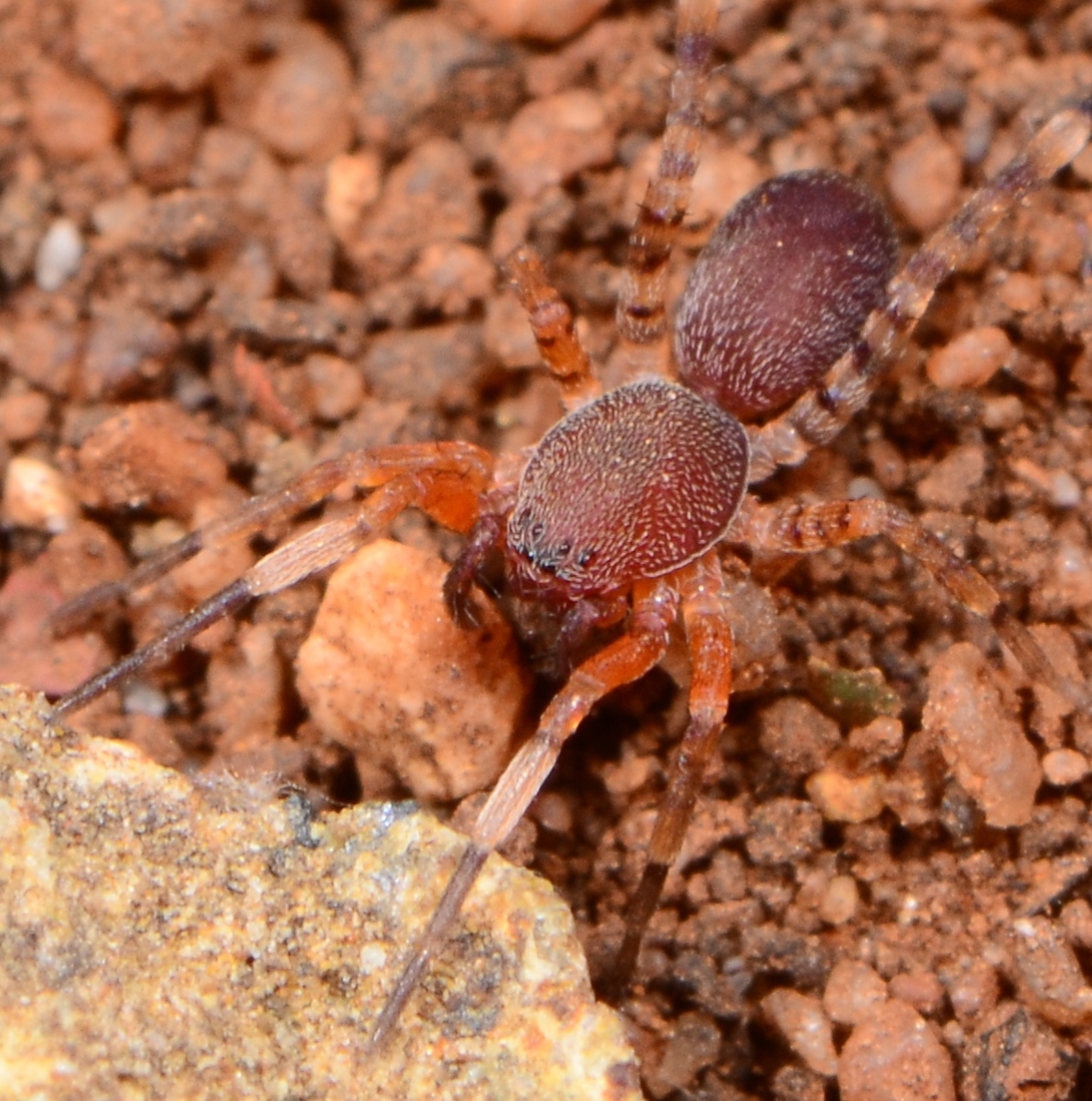
juvenile C. tropicalis

As of October 2025, this genus includes three species:

- Coenoptychus mutillicus (Haddad, 2004) – Burkino Faso, Ivory Coast, Nigeria, Cameroon, Ethiopia, Kenya, Tanzania, Botswana, Zimbabwe, South Africa, Lesotho
- Coenoptychus pulcher Simon, 1885 – India, Sri Lanka (type species)
- Coenoptychus tropicalis (Haddad, 2004) – Ivory Coast, DR Congo, Kenya, Tanzania, South Africa
