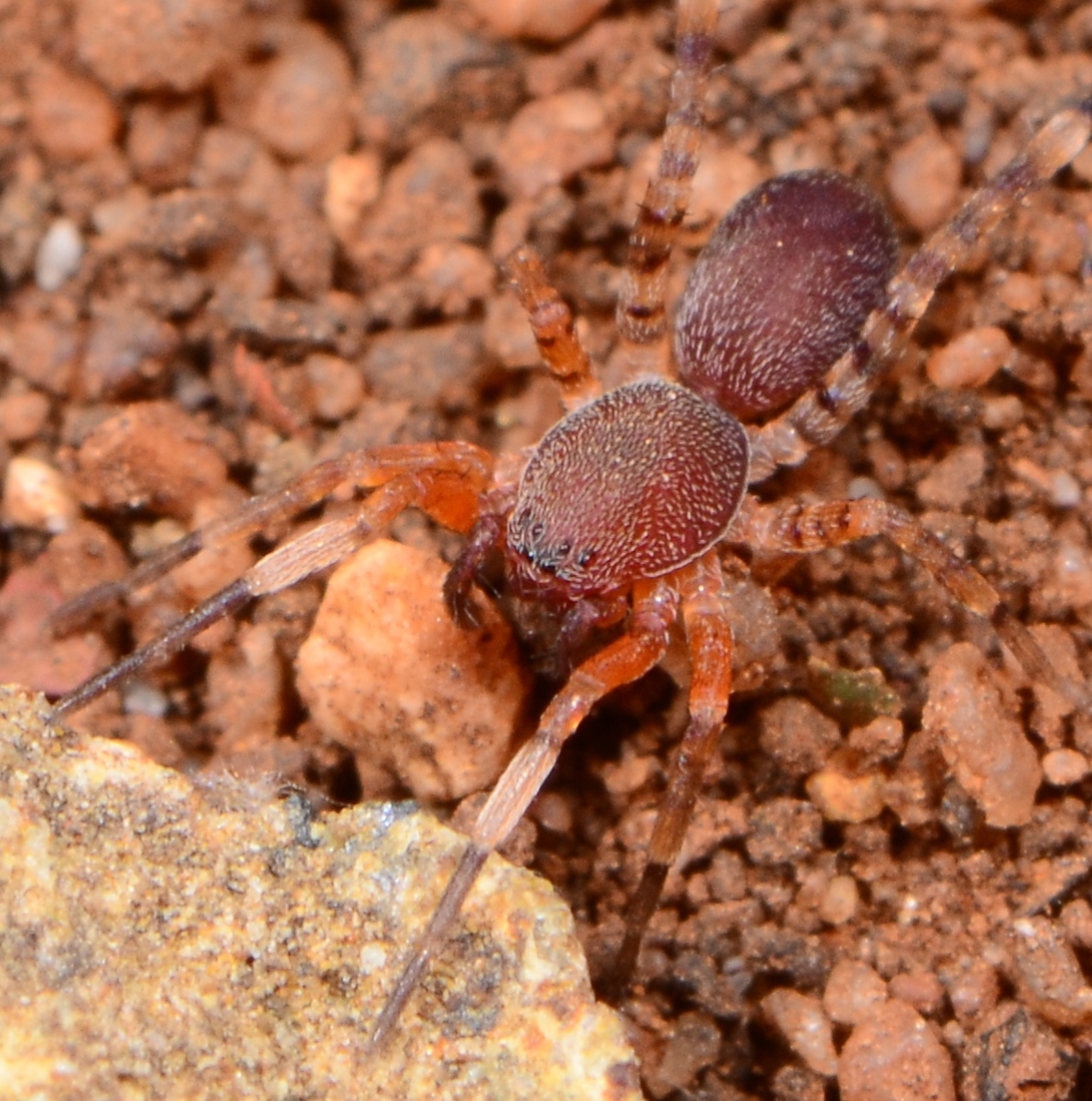
- Juvenile
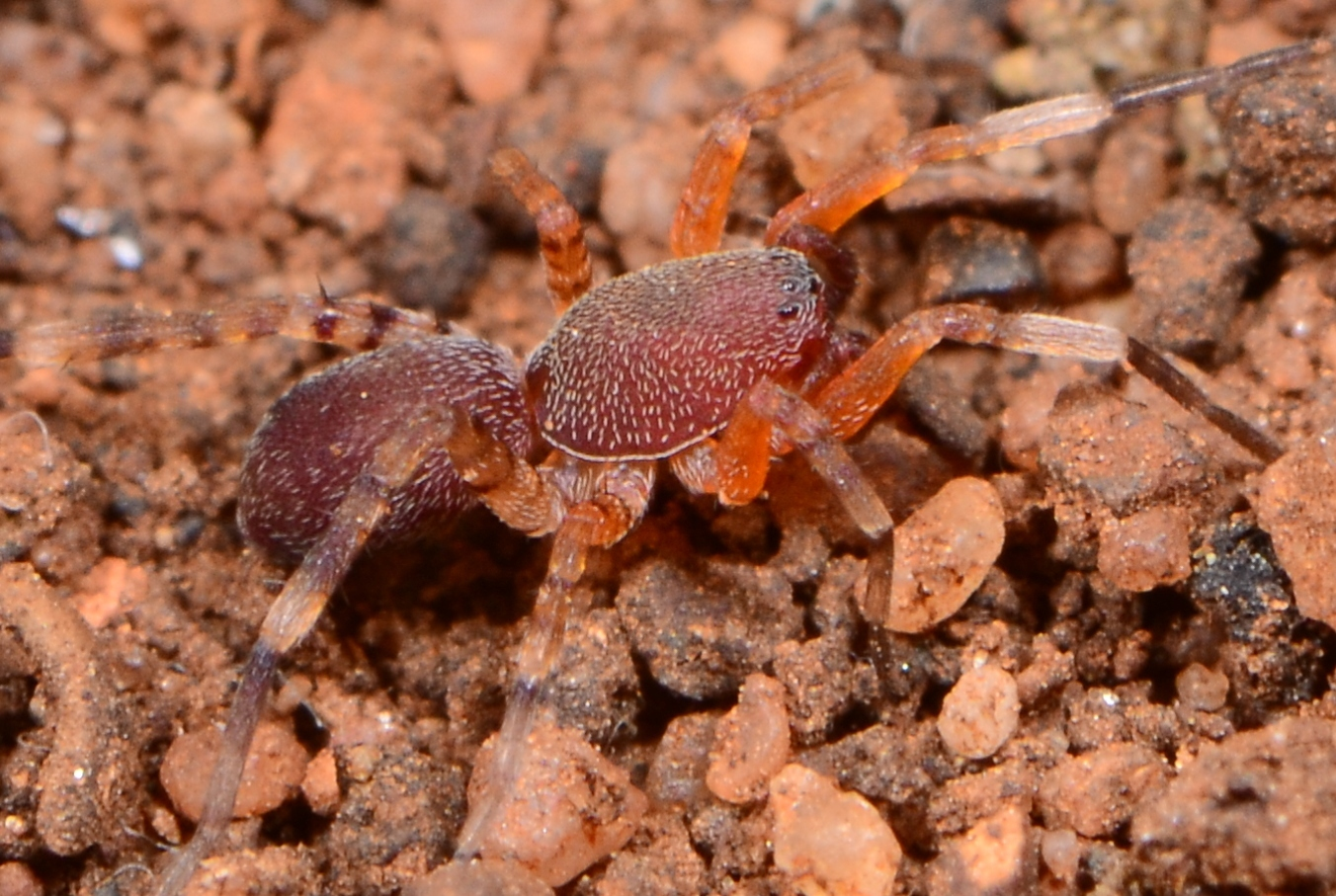
- Juvenile

Scientific classification
- Kingdom: Animalia
- Phylum: Arthropoda
- Subphylum: Chelicerata
- Class: Arachnida
- Order: Araneae
- Infraorder: Araneomorphae
- Family: Corinnidae
- Genus: Coenoptychus
- Species: C. tropicalis

Binomial name
- Coenoptychus tropicalis (Haddad, 2004)

Synonyms
- Graptartia tropicalis Haddad, 2004

= Coenoptychus tropicalis =

Tropical Dwarf Mutilliform Sac Spider

Species of spider

Coenoptychus tropicalis is a species of spider in the family Corinnidae. It is distributed across several African countries and is commonly known as Tropical dwarf mutilliform sac spider.

== Distribution ==
Coenoptychus tropicalis is distributed across Tanzania, Democratic Republic of the Congo, Kenya, Ivory Coast and South Africa. In South Africa, it is known from six provinces at altitudes ranging from 2 to 1,587 m above sea level, including ten protected areas.

== Habitat and ecology ==
This species has been recorded from all biomes except Succulent Karoo and Nama Karoo. They inhabit grasslands and leaf litter and have been collected from Indian Ocean Coastal Belt, Grassland, Fynbos, Savanna and Forest biomes.

Like C. mutillicus, this species is a free-living ground-dweller that resembles the wingless females of smaller genera of velvet ants (Hymenoptera: Mutillidae).

== Description ==
Coenoptychus tropicalis is known from both sexes. It shares the general morphological characteristics of the genus Coenoptychus, including the gradually raised carapace, granular surface texture, and the distinctive geometrical markings created by creamy-white feathery setae on the opisthosoma.

== Conservation ==
Coenoptychus tropicalis is listed as Least Concern due to its wide geographical range. The species is recorded from several protected areas.

== Taxonomy ==
Coenoptychus tropicalis was originally described as Graptartia tropicalis by species:Charles R. Haddad in 2004 from Tanzania. The species was transferred to Coenoptychus by Paul et al. in 2018.
