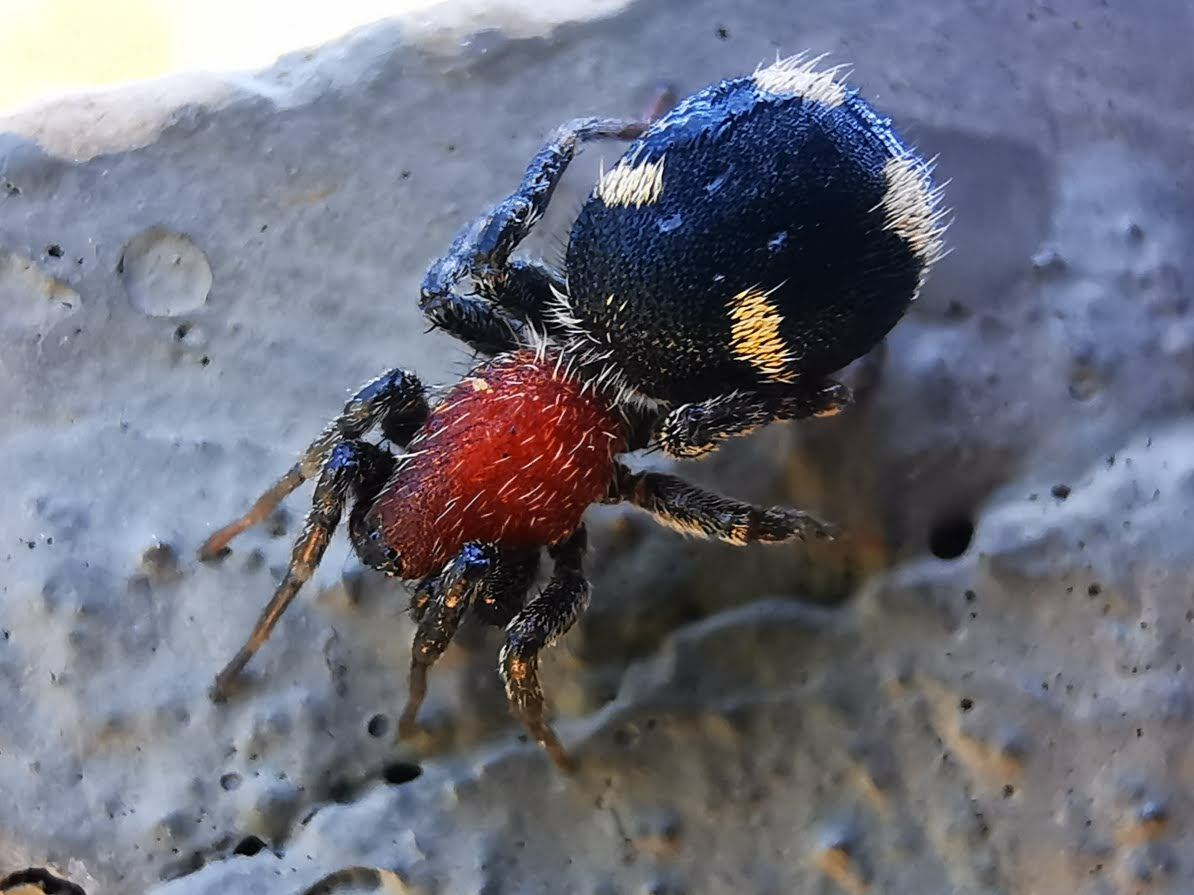
- G. granulosa from South Africa
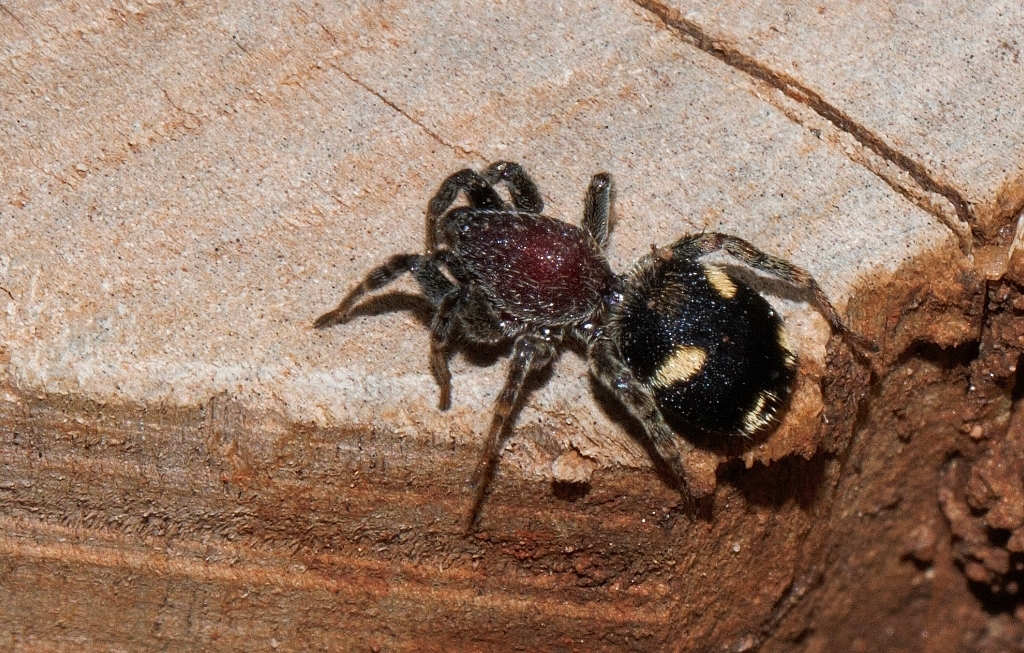

Scientific classification
- Kingdom: Animalia
- Phylum: Arthropoda
- Subphylum: Chelicerata
- Class: Arachnida
- Order: Araneae
- Infraorder: Araneomorphae
- Family: Corinnidae
- Genus: Graptartia
- Species: G. granulosa

Binomial name
- Graptartia granulosa Simon, 1896

= Graptartia granulosa =

Four-spotted mutilliform sac spider

Species of spider

Graptartia granulosa is a species of spider in the family Corinnidae. It occurs widely in southern Africa and is commonly known as the four-spotted mutilliform sac spider.

== Distribution ==
Graptartia granulosa is found in ten African countries: Botswana, Democratic Republic of the Congo, Kenya, Malawi, Mozambique, Namibia, Tanzania, Zambia, Zimbabwe, and South Africa. In South Africa, it has been recorded from Limpopo and KwaZulu-Natal at altitudes ranging from 286 to 1,217 m above sea level.

The species occurs in protected areas including Ndumo Game Reserve and Kruger National Park.

== Habitat and ecology ==
Graptartia granulosa is a ground-dwelling mimic of velvet ants that occurs in a variety of habitats but appears to prefer the Savanna biome.

It is usually collected in pitfall traps and leaf litter, or under prone objects where it shelters when not active.

== Conservation ==
Graptartia granulosa is listed as Least Concern by the South African National Biodiversity Institute due to its wide geographical range. There are no significant known threats to the species.

== Taxonomy ==
The species was originally described by Eugène Simon in 1896, with the type locality given as Zambezi. It was revised by Haddad in 2004.
