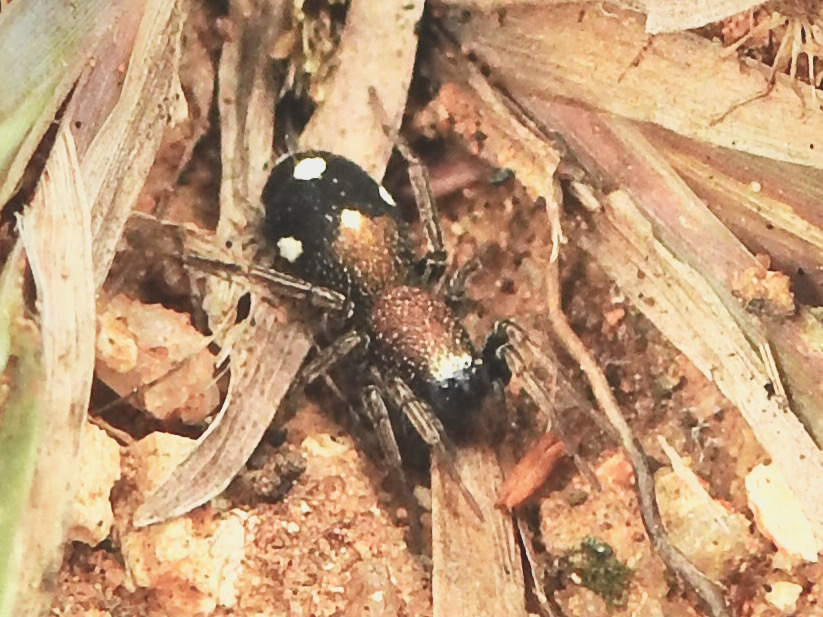

Scientific classification
- Kingdom: Animalia
- Phylum: Arthropoda
- Subphylum: Chelicerata
- Class: Arachnida
- Order: Araneae
- Infraorder: Araneomorphae
- Family: Corinnidae
- Genus: Coenoptychus
- Species: C. pulcher

Binomial name
- Coenoptychus pulcher Simon, 1885

Synonyms
- Onychocryptus mutillaris Karsch, 1892

= Coenoptychus pulcher =

Species of spider

Coenoptychus pulcher is a species of spider in the family Corinnidae, found in India and Sri Lanka.
