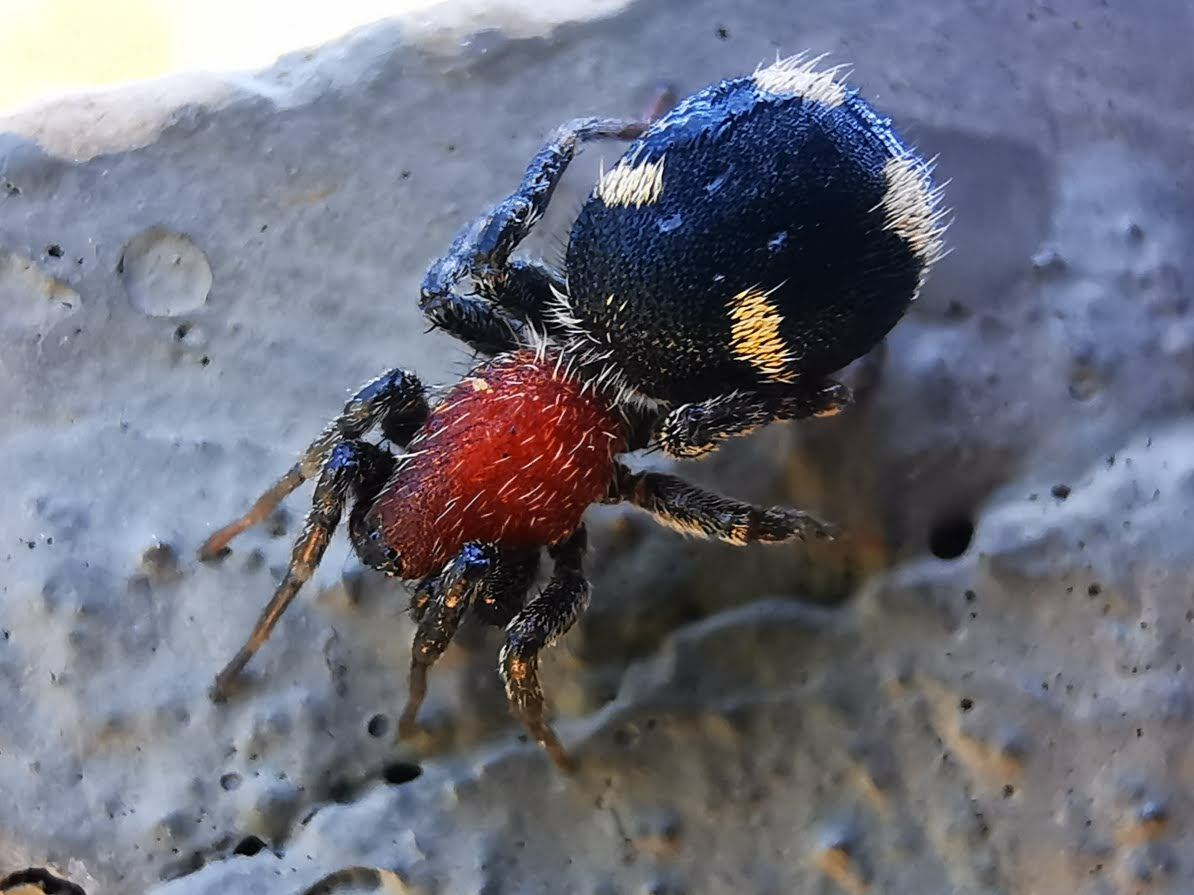
- G. granulosa from South Africa
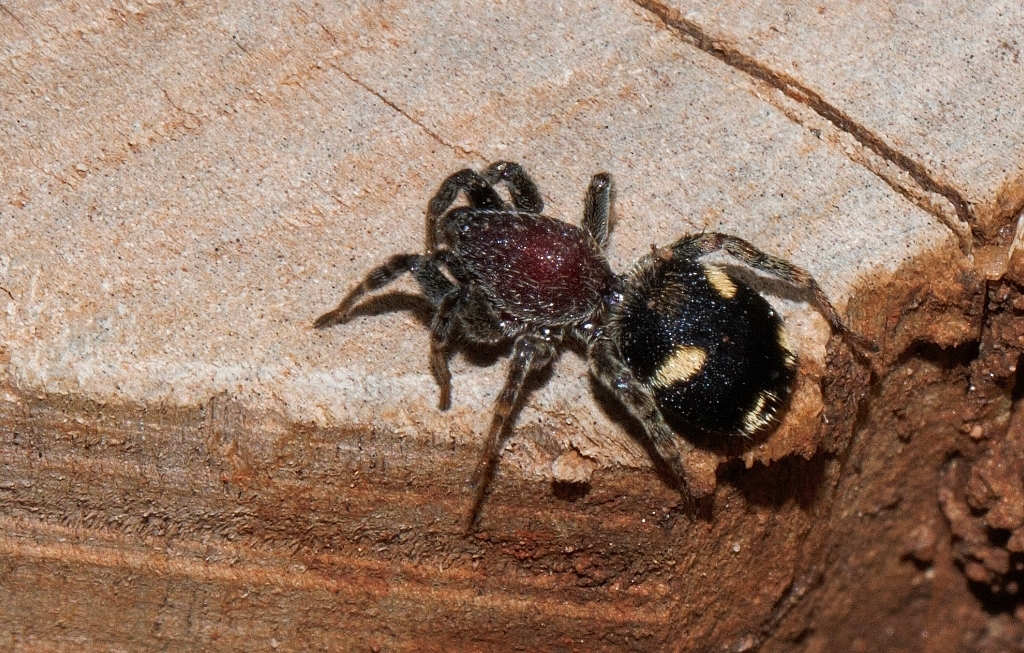

Scientific classification
- Kingdom: Animalia
- Phylum: Arthropoda
- Subphylum: Chelicerata
- Class: Arachnida
- Order: Araneae
- Infraorder: Araneomorphae
- Family: Corinnidae
- Genus: Graptartia; Simon, 1896

Type species
- G. granulosa Simon, 1896

Species
- 2, see text

= Graptartia =

Genus of spiders

Graptartia is a genus of African corinnid sac spiders first described by Eugène Simon in 1896, with two described species.

== Description ==
The carapace is uniformly deep orange, red, or purple, evenly high and slightly elevated towards the rear, reaching its highest point at two-thirds its length. The surface is granular, especially at setal bases, with short and long white setae scattered across the surface.

The opisthosoma is oval with a large dorsal scutum and a pitted dorsum with blackened undertones. Two pairs of large, white spots are present dorsally, composed of white clavate setae. The legs have scattered feathery setae.

== Species ==
As of October 2025, this genus includes two species:

- Graptartia granulosa Simon, 1896 – DR Congo, Kenya, Tanzania, Zambia, Malawi, Namibia, Botswana, Zimbabwe, Mozambique, South Africa (type species)
- Graptartia scabra (Simon, 1878) – Morocco, Algeria
