= Asemonea virgea =

Scientific classification
- Kingdom: Animalia
- Phylum: Arthropoda
- Subphylum: Chelicerata
- Class: Arachnida
- Order: Araneae
- Infraorder: Araneomorphae
- Family: Salticidae
- Subfamily: Asemoneinae
- Genus: Asemonea
- Species: A. virgea

Binomial name
- Asemonea virgea Wesołowska & Szűts, 2003

Species of jumping spider

Asemonea virgea is a species of jumping spider that has been seen in Guinea and the Republic of the Congo. A member of the genus Asemonea, the spider was first described in 2003 by Wanda Wesołowska and Tamás Szűts. The spider is very small, with a darker yellow forward section, or cephalothorax, that is between 1.4 and 1.6 mm (0.055 and 0.063 in) long and, behind that, a narrower lighter yellow abdomen that is between 1.7 and 1.8 mm (0.067 and 0.071 in) long. It is the copulatory organs that help identify the species. The male has a distinctive set of spines on its palpal tibia, after which it is named. It is similar to the related Asemonea cristata but differs in its species range, as the other spider is found in Burma, and the male's shorter femoral apophysis. The female has large lips around the openings that show strong signs of sclerotization and a characteristic knob on the middle of its epigyne, the external visible part of its copulatory organs.

== Taxonomy ==
Asemonea virgea is a jumping spider, a member of the family Salticidae, that was first described by the arachnologists Wanda Wesołowska and Tamás Szűts in 2003. It is one of over 500 species identified by the Polish arachnologist Wesołowska. The species was allocated to the genus Asemonea, first raised by Octavius Pickard-Cambridge in 1869. The genus is related to Lyssomanes, but the relationship is uncertain. Molecular analysis demonstrates that the genus is similar to Goleba and Pandisus. In Wayne Maddison's 2015 study of spider phylogenetic classification, the genus Asemonea was the type genus for the subfamily Asemoneinae. A year later, in 2016, Jerzy Prószyński named it as the type genus for the Asemoneines group of genera, which was also named after the genus. The species itself has a specific name that is derived from the Latin for 'rod' and recalls the spines on the palpal tibia.

== Description ==
The spider is very small. The female has a forward section, or cephalothorax, that is between 1.4 and 1.6 mm (0.055 and 0.063 in) long and has a typical width of 1 mm (0.039 in). The hard upper surface of its cephalothorax, its pear-shaped carapace, is generally yellowish-brown and covered in very fine white hairs. It has a thin brown line along its edges and its eye field is slightly hairier, lighter and yellowish. Its eyes are relatively large and arranged in four rows. There are black areas around all of them apart from the middle ones at the front. There are a few bristles near the front row of eyes. There is a noticeable valley, or fovea, in the middle of its carapace. The underside of its front section, its sternum, is shaped like a heart. The part of its face known as its clypeus is whiteish.

Situated behind its carapace, the spider's abdomen is narrower and measures between 1.7 and 1.8 mm (0.067 and 0.071 in) in length and 0.9 and 1 mm (0.035 and 0.039 in) in width. On the top, it is pale yellow with a pattern of six brown spots arranged in pairs running down the middle and a thin long line along its edge. Underneath, it is whitish. It has long spinnerets that it uses to spin webs and long thin legs. They are generally whitish-yellow, although its fourth pair have got dark marks on some of their sections. They have many long brownish leg spines and fine hairs on the surface.

The female spider's copulatory organs are distinctive. Its epigyne, the external visible part of their structure, has an oval knob extending from the middle and large round copulatory openings near the back. The openings lead via very short ducts to tubular spermathecae, or receptacles. As well as by the presence of the knob in the middle of its epigyne, the spider can be distinguished from other spiders in the genus by the large lips around the openings that show strong signs of sclerotization.

The male has a moderately high pear-shaped carapace, that is typically 1.6 mm (0.063 in) long and 1.2 mm (0.047 in) wide. It is similar to the female, dark yellow with a thin brown line around the edge and a slightly lighter eye field with the eyes arranged in four rows. As with the female's, all its eyes, apart from the middle ones at the front, have black surrounds. Similarly, its sternum is wide and heart-shaped and its clypeus is white. The spider's chelicerae are orange, with five small teeth visible on both the front and rear edges.

The male's oval abdomen is typically 1.8 mm (0.071 in) long and 1.0 mm (0.039 in) wide. It is pale yellow with a brownish band across the edge, small dark dots towards the sides and two arrow-shaped dark patches on the top. As with the female, its underside is whiteish. The spider has long spinnerets and long thin generally whitish-yellow legs like the female Its front legs have dark lines and dots on some of its sections. There are light leg hairs and very pale long slender leg spines visible on all of them.

The male's light brown pedipalps have a long furrow on the palpal femur that is lined with very fine hairs and a projection, or femoral apophysis, that has a pointed end. The femur has a large spine and, connected to the femur, the palpal tibia has two more. The tibia also has three triangular bumps, a large retrolateral tibial apophysis that is large shaped like an anvil and a tibial apophysis that curves out and then upwards, finishing with a point that curves back towards the spider's cymbium. Attached to the cambium is a palpal bulb that is bulbous and has a long embolus that starts on a large round section towards the top, which it then proceeds to coil round before settling on the outside pointing down. Although the spider resembles Asemonea cristata, found in Burma. It can be distinguished by its shorter femoral apophysis. This also distinguishes it from the related Asemonea cuprea, alongside the bumps on the side of its palpal tibia.

== Behaviour ==
The spider is typical of the genus. Despite being termed jumping spiders, Asemonea spiders rarely jump. Instead, they generally walk and run. They spin sheet webs on the underside of leaves. Although predominantly a diurnal hunter, the spider is also likely to eat nectar if it is available. When hunting, they mainly lunged or leapt at prey, a leap often occurring when the prey is 1 to 2 m (3 ft 3 in to 6 ft 7 in) away, a lunge usually closer. They use visual displays during courtship and transmit vibratory signals through silk to communicate to other spiders.

== Distribution and habitat ==
Asemonea species have a wide Species distribution, living across Africa, Asia and as far as Australia. Asemonea virgea has been seen in Guinea and the Republic of the Congo. The holotype was found near Brazzaville in 1963. The spiders thrive in trees and shrubs. In Guinea, it has been found in the Nimba Mountains at an altitude of 500 m (1,600 ft) above sea level.
