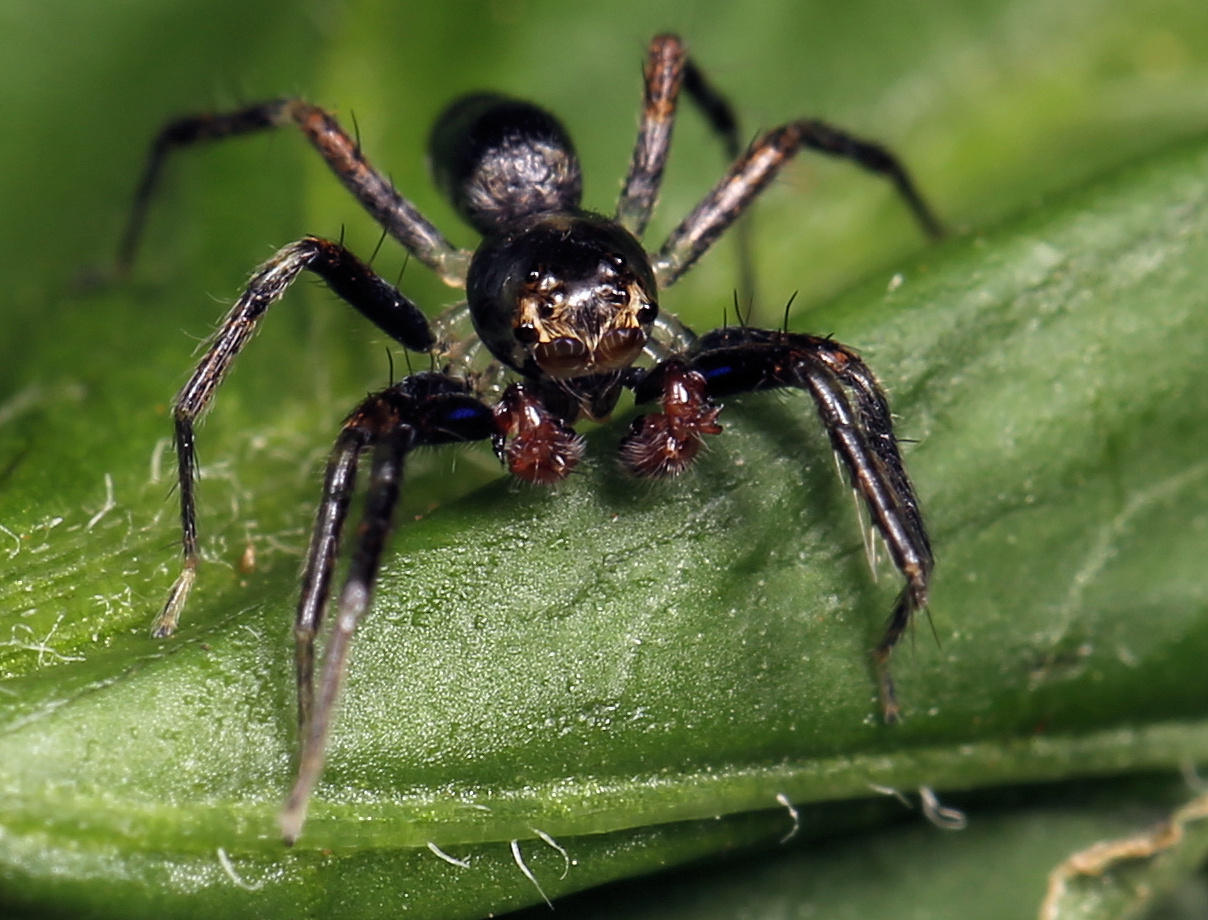
- A spider of the Asemonea genus

Scientific classification
- Kingdom: Animalia
- Phylum: Arthropoda
- Subphylum: Chelicerata
- Class: Arachnida
- Order: Araneae
- Infraorder: Araneomorphae
- Family: Salticidae
- Subfamily: Asemoneinae
- Genus: Asemonea
- Species: A. pallida

Binomial name
- Asemonea pallida Wesołowska, 2001

= Asemonea pallida =

Species of spider

Asemonea pallida is a species of jumping spider in the genus Asemonea that is endemic to Kenya. The spider was first defined in 2001 by Wanda Wesołowska, one of over 500 that the arachnologist described during her career. The spider is small, and light, nearly white, as is reflected in the species name. It has an elongated carapace that is between 1.9 and 2.2 mm (0.075 and 0.087 in) long and a broader abdomen that has a length between 3.0 and 3.1 mm (0.12 and 0.12 in). The female has a distinctive epigyne with two depressions joined by an elevated bridge. The male has not been described.

== Taxonomy ==
Asemonea pallida is a jumping spider that was first described by the Polish arachnologist Wanda Wesołowska in 2001, one of over 500 species she identified during her career. The species was allocated to the genus Asemonea, first raised by Octavius Pickard-Cambridge in 1869. The genus is related to Lyssomanes. Molecular analysis demonstrates that the genus is similar to Goleba and Pandisus. In Wayne Maddison's 2015 study of spider phylogenetic classification, the genus Asemonea was the type genus for the subfamily Asemoneinae. A year later, in 2016, Jerzy Prószyński named it as the type genus for the Asemoneines group of genera, which was also named after the genus. The species itself has a name that is derived from the Latin for pale and relates to its coloration.

== Description ==
The spider is small. The female has a moderately high elongated carapace that is between 1.9 and 2.2 mm (0.075 and 0.087 in) long and between 1.4 and 1.8 mm (0.055 and 0.071 in) wide. It is very light, a whitish-yellow with an even lighter eye field. Black rings surround the eyes. Typically for the genus, the eyes arranged in two rows. It has a whitish clypeus. The chelicerae are light yellow, with two small teeth visible at the front and three at the back. The abdomen is yellower and slightly broader than the carapace, between 3.0 and 3.1 mm (0.12 and 0.12 in) long and between 1.5 and 1.8 mm (0.059 and 0.071 in) wide. It has light spinnerets and long thin yellow legs. The pedipalps are light brown. There are spines on the palpal tibia. The epigyne is an oval with two large rounded depression towards the middle, with a raised bridge in between them. This is a distinguishing feature of the species. The seminal ducts are shorter than the similar Asemonea flava. They are initially very wide, narrowing as the wend their way to the receptacles. The male has not been described.

== Behaviour ==
The spider is typical of the genus. Asemonea spiders rarely jump. Instead, they generally walk and run. The y spin sheet webs on the underside of leaves, where they also lay their eggs. Although predominantly a diurnal hunter, the spider is also likely to eat nectar.

== Distribution and habitat ==
The species is endemic to Kenya. The holotype was found in the Cherangany Hills in 1966 at an altitude of 1,880 m (6,170 ft) above sea level. Examples have been found on vegetation near water. It thrives in mountainous areas.
