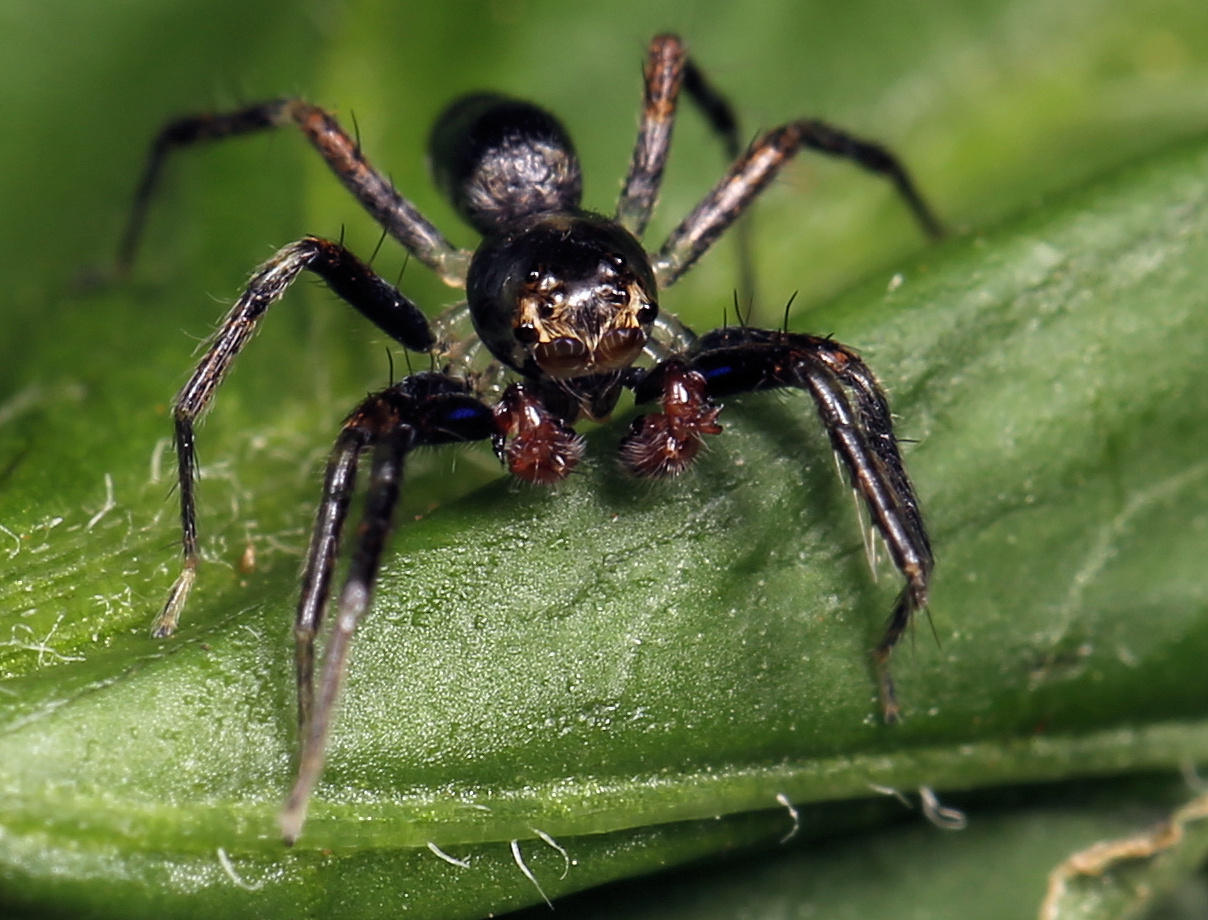
- A spider of the Asemonea genus

Scientific classification
- Kingdom: Animalia
- Phylum: Arthropoda
- Subphylum: Chelicerata
- Class: Arachnida
- Order: Araneae
- Infraorder: Araneomorphae
- Family: Salticidae
- Subfamily: Asemoneinae
- Genus: Asemonea
- Species: A. serrata

Binomial name
- Asemonea serrata Wesołowska, 2001

= Asemonea serrata =

Species of spider

Asemonea serrata is a species of jumping spider in the genus Asemonea that is endemic to Kenya. The spider was first defined in 2001 by Wanda Wesołowska, one of over 500 that the arachnologist described during her career. The spider is small, with a yellow-orange carapace typically 2.5 mm (0.098 in) long and yellow abdomen typically 2.5 mm (0.098 in) long. The abdomen has a black arrow-shape on it. The male is distinguished from other Asemonea species by the serrated edge on its the long and thin femoral apophysis. This is also recalled in the species name. The female has not been described.

== Taxonomy ==
Asemonea serrata is a jumping spider that was first described by the Polish arachnologist Wanda Wesołowska in 2001, one of over 500 species she identified during her career. She allocated the species to the genus Asemonea, first raised by Octavius Pickard-Cambridge in 1869. The genus is related to Lyssomanes. Molecular analysis demonstrates that the genus is similar to Goleba and Pandisus. In Wayne Maddison's 2015 study of spider phylogenetic classification, the genus Asemonea was the type genus for the subfamily Asemoneinae. A year later, in 2016, Jerzy Prószyński named it as the type genus for the Asemoneines group of genera, which was also named after the genus. The species itself has a name that is derived from the Latin for saw-toothed and relates to the shape of the femoral apophysis.

== Description ==
The spider is small. The male has a moderately high rounded carapace that is typically 2.5 mm (0.098 in) long and 1.7 mm (0.067 in) wide. It is yellow-orange with a pale yellow eye field. The eyes are surrounded by black areas. Typically for the genus, the eyes arranged in two rows. It has a whitish clypeus. The chelicerae are orange, with two small teeth visible at the front and three small ones at the back. The abdomen is narrower than the carapace, typically 2.5 mm (0.098 in) long and 1.2 mm (0.047 in) wide. The topside is yellow with a black arrow-shaped patch towards the middle and two narrow brown stripes towards the front. The underside is whitish. It has light long spinnerets and yellow legs. The pedipalps are light brown. The palpal femur has a large furrow on the top surface. The dorsal tibial apophysis has three sharp tips.

The long and thin femoral apophysis has a serrated edge, after which the species is named. It is otherwise very similar to other species in the genus, particularly Asemonea maculata. The female has not been described.

== Behaviour ==
The spider is typical of the genus. Asemonea spiders rarely jump. Instead, they generally walk and run. They spin sheet webs on the underside of leaves, where they also lay their eggs. Although predominantly a diurnal hunter, the spider is also likely to eat nectar.

== Distribution and habitat ==
The species is endemic to Kenya. The holotype was found on Mount Elgon in 1938 at an altitude of 2,275 m (7,464 ft) above sea level. It lives in vegetation of the Podocarpus genus. It thrives in mountainous areas.
