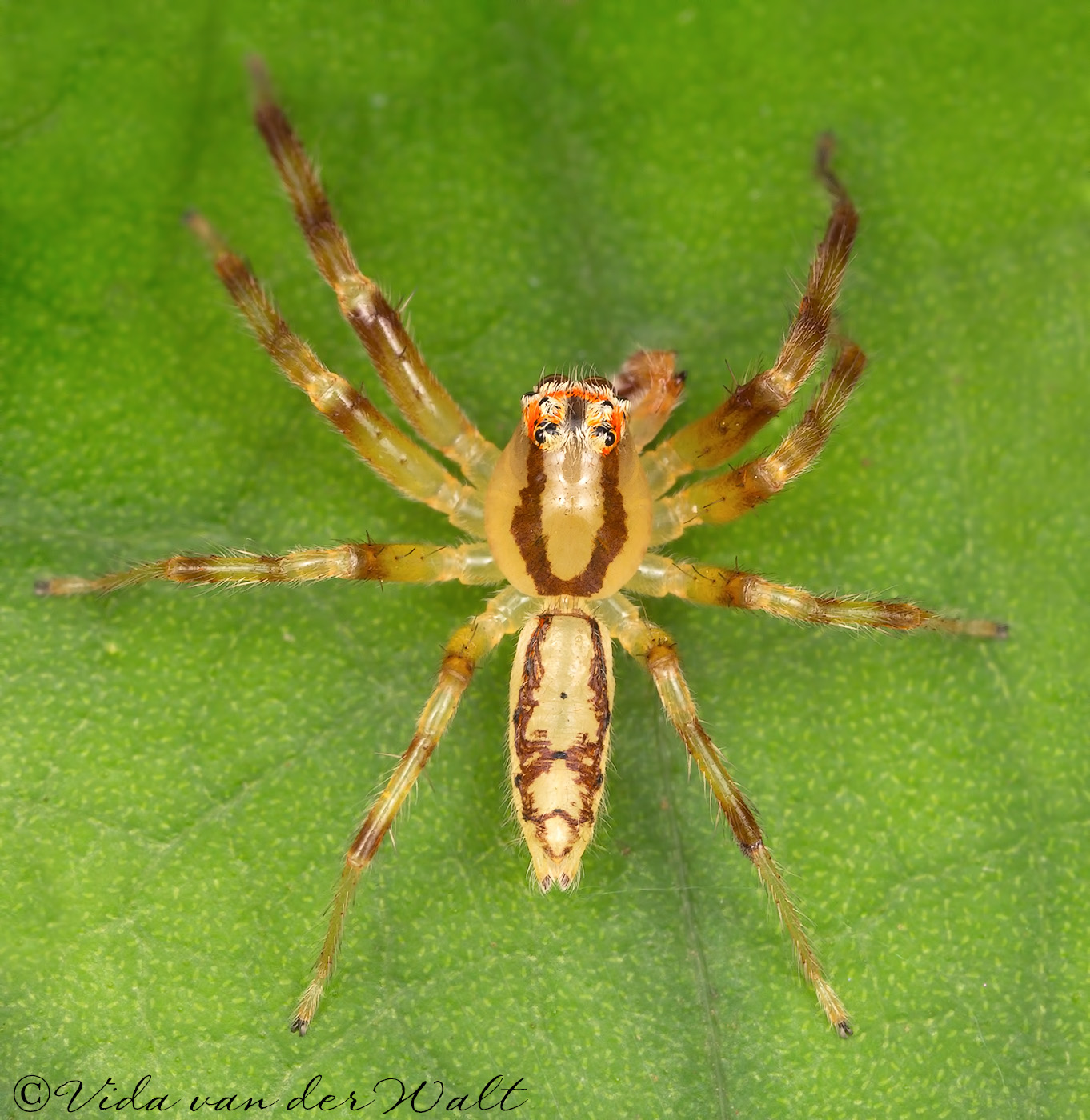
- A male Asemonea amatola
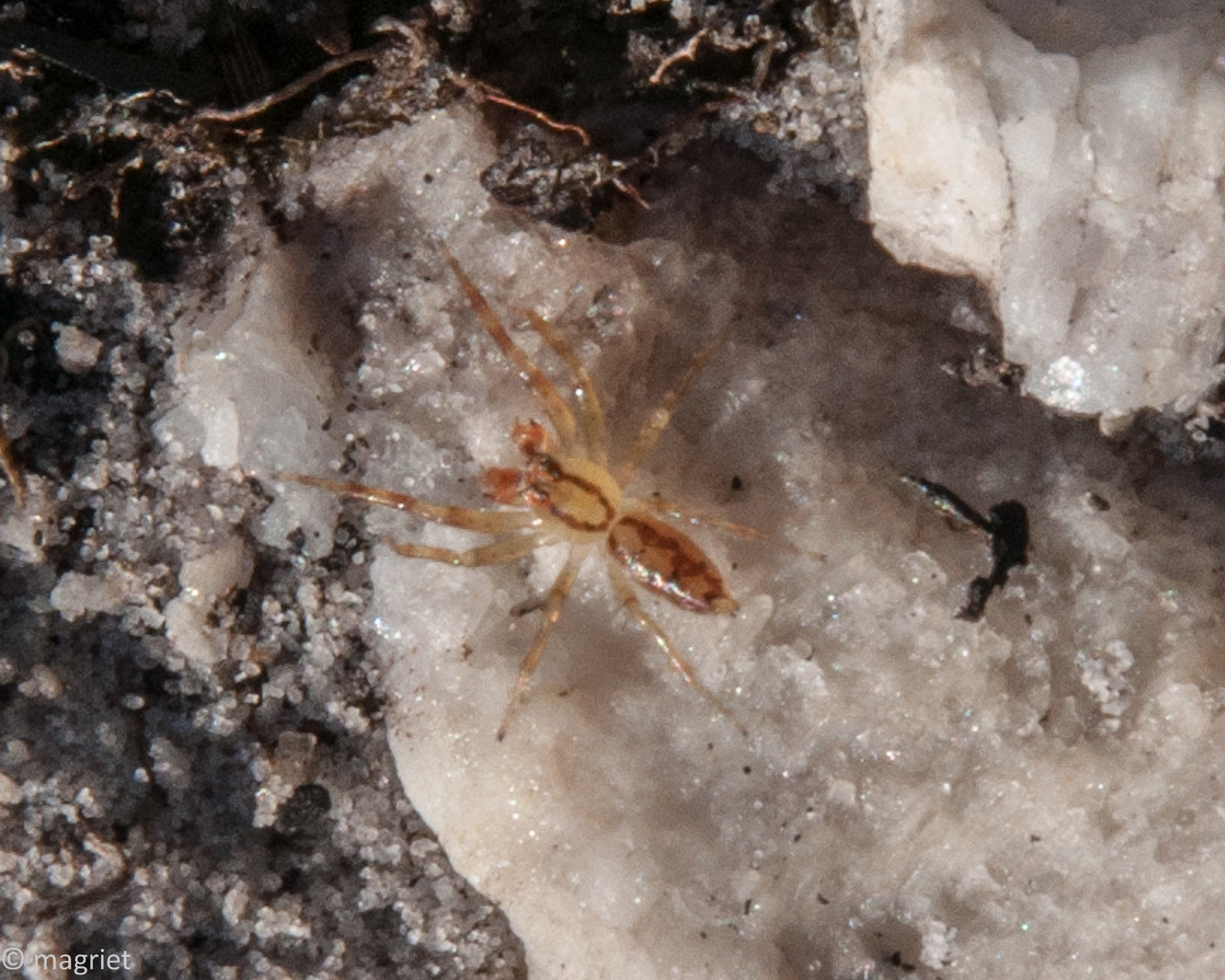

Scientific classification
- Kingdom: Animalia
- Phylum: Arthropoda
- Subphylum: Chelicerata
- Class: Arachnida
- Order: Araneae
- Infraorder: Araneomorphae
- Family: Salticidae
- Subfamily: Asemoneinae
- Genus: Asemonea
- Species: A. amatola

Binomial name
- Asemonea amatola Wesołowska & Haddad, 2013

= Asemonea amatola =

Amatola Asemonea Jumping Spider

Species of jumping spider

Asemonea amatola is a species of jumping spider in the genus Asemonea that is endemic to South Africa. It lives on trees in mountain ranges, particularly the Amathole Mountains after which it is named. It is a small spider with a white or whitish-yellow pear-shaped carapace between 2.0 and 2.6 mm (0.079 and 0.102 in) long and an abdomen between 2.4 and 2.8 mm (0.094 and 0.110 in) long that has a pattern of dark dots on an otherwise light surface. Its copulatory organs are distinctive. The female has spines on its pedipalps and a large epigyne with two large shallow depressions. The male is larger than the female and has a distinctive pedipalp with a three-armed apophysis on the femur and three apophyses on the tibia. The spider was first described in 2013 by Wanda Wesołowska and Charles Haddad.

== Taxonomy ==
Asemonea amatola, commonly known as the Amatola Asemonea Jumping Spider, is a species of jumping spider, a member of the family Salticidae, that was first described by the arachnologists Wanda Wesołowska and Charles Haddad in 2013. It is one of over 500 species the Polish scientist Wesołowska identified during her career. They allocated the species to the genus Asemonea, first raised by Octavius Pickard-Cambridge in 1869. The genus is related to Lyssomanes. Molecular analysis demonstrates that the genus is similar to Goleba and Pandisus. In Wayne Maddison's 2015 study of spider phylogenetic classification, the genus Asemonea was the type genus for the subfamily Asemoneinae. A year later, in 2016, Jerzy Prószyński named it as the type genus for the Asemoneines group of genera, which was also named after the genus.

== Description ==
The spider is small and pale, with a body that is divided into two main parts, a cephalothorax and an abdomen. The female has a cephalothorax that is typically 2.0 mm (0.079 in) long and 1.6 mm (0.063 in) wide. It has a pear-shaped white carapace, the hard upper part of the cephalothorax, apart from two faint darker bands and black rings around the eyes. The underside of the cephalothorax, or sternum, is whitish. Light hairs cover the entire body. The spider's chelicerae has three small teeth visible at the front and four at the back and its remaining mouthparts are white. Its abdomen is typically 2.4 mm (0.094 in) long and 1.5 mm (0.059 in) wide. It is pale like the spider's carapace, both on top and underneath, with indistinct dark steaks across the back. It has a pattern of five small dark spots towards the back. The spider's spinnerets are white, as are the thin legs. Its pedipalps have six spines. Its epigyne, the outward visible part of its copulatory organs, is large and broad with two large but shallow depressions. The copulatory openings are located in narrow fissures and show strong evidence of sclerotization.

The male is larger than the female, with a cephalothorax measuring 2.6 mm (0.10 in) long and 2.0 mm (0.079 in) wide and an abdomen 2.8 mm (0.11 in) long and 1.2 mm (0.047 in) wide. Its carapace is low, pear-shaped and whitish-yellow, with two light brown streaks crossing the back. Its eyes have black rings like the female and are arranged in four rows. Occasional orange hairs can be seen on the eye field and brown clypeus. The spider's chelicerae has white hairs at their bases. Its abdomen is narrow and white with a similar pattern of dots to the female. Its white spinnerets have dark tips and its legs are similarly white but have brownish rings on them. Like the female, its copulatory organs are distinctive. Its pedipalp is light and has a femoral apophysis consisting of three appendages, or apophyses, on the tibia, sharp curved prolateral and dorsal apophyses, and a rounded retrolateral apophysis. Its embolus is short and curves around the end of the tegulum. The shape of the pedipalp, particularly the three-armed femoral apophysis, is distinctive for the species.

== Behaviour and habitat ==
Asemonea amatola is a tree-dwelling spider. It thrives in mountainous areas, particularly in the mountains near Hogsback. Asemonea spiders rarely jump. Instead, they generally walk and run. They spin sheet webs on the underside of leaves, where they also lay their eggs. The holotype was found living in the canopy of broadleaf trees in a domestic garden. Although the species has been found in the autumn, it is more abundant in spring. Despite being predominantly a diurnal hunter, the spider is also likely to eat nectar if it is available.

== Distribution ==
Asemonea species have a wide Species distribution, being found across Africa, Asia and as far as Australia. The species is endemic to South Africa. It is a relatively rare species and its exact distribution is known. The female holotype was found in the Amatola Mountains of Eastern Cape in 2010. The male was first identified in the same locality in 2013, at an altitude of 1,250 m (4,100 ft) above sea level. The species is named for the mountain range where it was first found.
