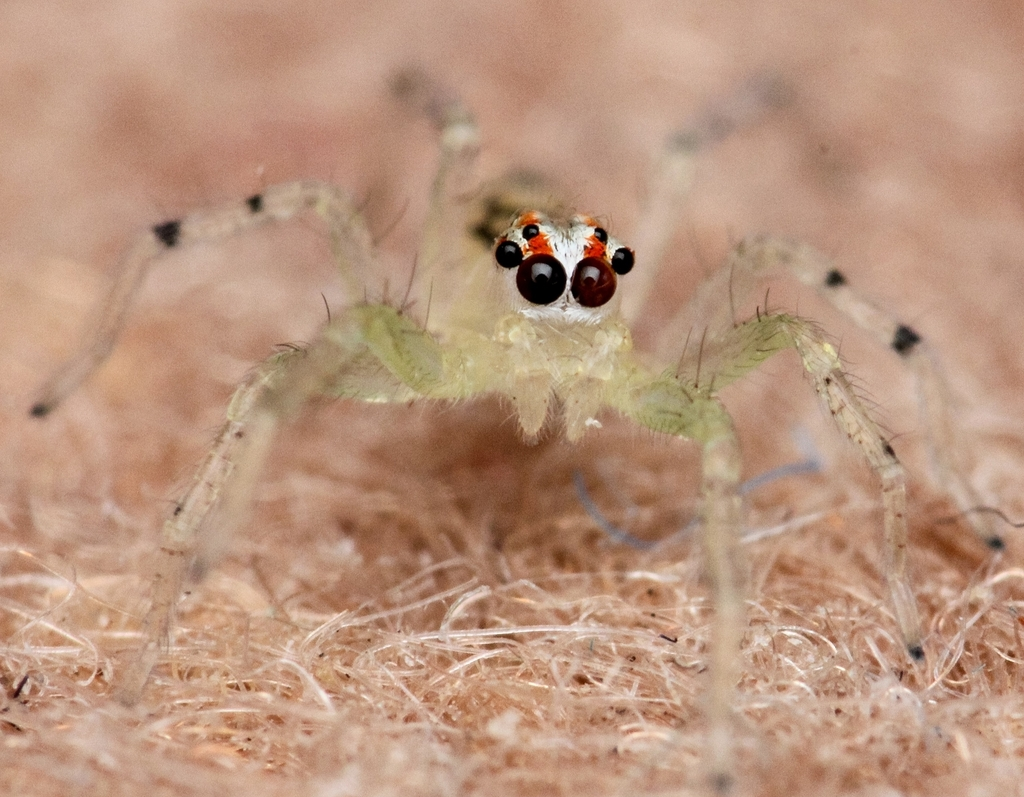
- Asemonea stella observed in Zimbabwe
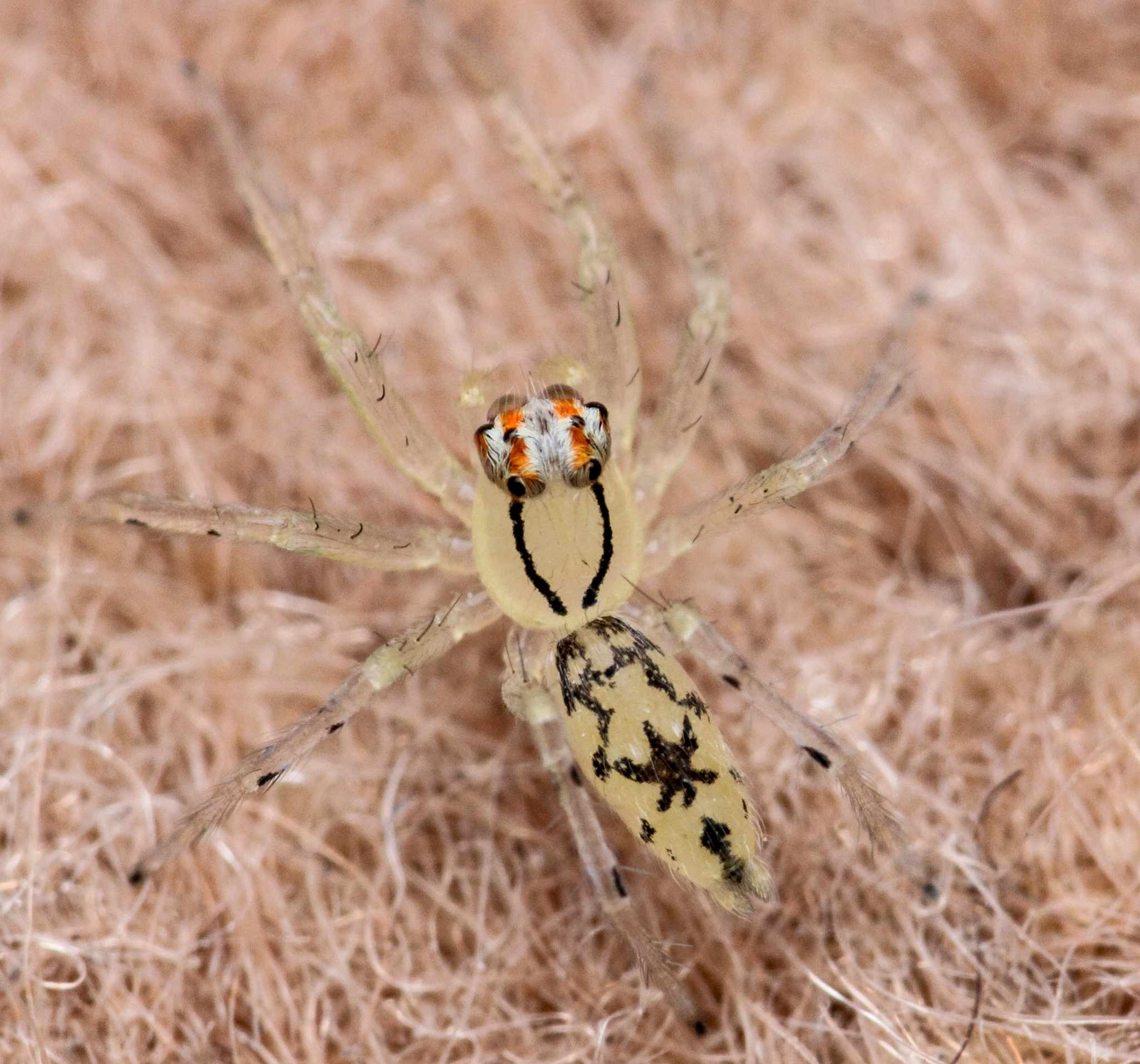
- Another view of the same spider

Scientific classification
- Kingdom: Animalia
- Phylum: Arthropoda
- Subphylum: Chelicerata
- Class: Arachnida
- Order: Araneae
- Infraorder: Araneomorphae
- Family: Salticidae
- Subfamily: Asemoneinae
- Genus: Asemonea
- Species: A. stella

Binomial name
- Asemonea stella Wanless, 1980

= Asemonea stella =

Kenya Asemonea Jumping Spider

Species of spider

Asemonea stella, the Kenya Asemonea Jumping Spider, is a species of jumping spider that has been found in Kenya, South Africa and Tanzania, and has been introduced to Australia. A member of the genus Asemonea, it thrives in a wide range of environments, from open farmland to semi-aquatic vegetation. The spider was first described in 1980 by Fred Wanless. The spider is small, between 3.1 and 3.64 mm (0.122 and 0.143 in) long, the female being generally larger than the male. It has a front section, or carapace, that is pear-shaped and either yellow in the case of the male or green in the case of the female, measuring between 1.28 and 1.46 mm (0.050 and 0.057 in) in length. Its rear section, or abdomen, is whiter, between 1.28 and 1.46 mm (0.050 and 0.057 in) long and, in the case of the male, has a distinctive star-shaped pattern on the back. Apart from this star, it is the copulatory organs that help differentiate the species from its relatives, particularly the furrow on the femoral apophysis on the male's palpal bulb and the shallow depression in the middle of the female's epigyne.

== Taxonomy ==
Asemonea stella is an African jumping spider, a member of the family Salticidae, that was first described by the arachnologist Fred Wanless in 1980. He allocated the species to the genus Asemonea, first raised by Octavius Pickard-Cambridge in 1869. The genus is related to Lyssomanes. Molecular analysis demonstrates that the genus is similar to Goleba and Pandisus. In Wayne Maddison's 2015 study of spider phylogenetic classification, the genus Asemonea was the type genus for the subfamily Asemoneinae. A year later, in 2016, Jerzy Prószyński named it as the type genus for the Asemoneines group of genera, which was also named after the genus. The holotype is stored at the Natural History Museum, London. The spider is known as the Kenya Asemonea Jumping Spider.

== Description ==
The spider is small. The male is approximately 3.16 mm (0.124 in) long. It has a yellow front section, or carapace, that is typically 1.44 mm (0.057 in) long and 1.13 mm (0.044 in) wide. It is paler to the back and tends to whitish-yellow near the eye field, which has a fringe of silky white hairs. There is a black v-shaped marking on its back and there are black rings around many of its eyes. The part of its face known as its clypeus is pale yellow and shiny. The underside of its front section, its sternum, is also pale yellow, as are its mouthparts, including its labium and maxillae.

Situated behind its carapace, the male spider's abdomen is whitish yellow and shiny, with a distinctive black star and two black patches on its back. The star helps differentiate the species, particularly from the related Asemonea pulchra. The underside of its abdomen is whitish yellow with black patch clearly visible. It has a length between 1.28 and 1.76 mm (0.050 and 0.069 in). Its spinnerets are black with a fringe of dark brown hairs. It has an elongate posterior with a moderately long terminal article and a black anal tubercle. Its legs are pale yellow with patches of black.

The male spider's copulatory organs are distinctive. Its pedipalps finish with a slightly lumpy palpal tibia that has a thumb-like projection, or tibial apophysis. Connected to the tibia is an irregularly-shaped palpal bulb that has a furrow on the femoral apophysis and lacks the flange on the tegulum of other species. Embracing the bulb is a larger and smoother cymbium with a long thin spike, or embolus sandwiched between the spider's palpal bulb and its cymbium. Examples in South Africa have a pale green tint that enable them to blend into their habitat.

The female is between 3.1 and 3.64 mm (0.122 and 0.143 in) long. It has a carapace that is between 1.28 and 1.46 mm (0.050 and 0.057 in) and between 0.85 and 1.1 mm (0.033 and 0.043 in) wide. Its carapace is pear-shaped and light green with two parallel black lines and an eye field with four rows of eyes. As is typical for Lyssomaninae spiders, these are mounted on tubercles and surrounded by black rings; its middle eyes are relatively large. Its clypeus is whitish and rather high. Its sternum is pale, as are its mouthparts. Its number of teeth vary between specimens, with one found in Tanzania having chelicerae with two teeth at the front and four very small teeth to the back, one found in South Africa having five very small teeth at the front and four at the back and one found in Australia having three teeth at the front and seven at the back.

Its abdomen has a less clear pattern to the male, with a few black marks visible on its upper side on a whitish background and a light underside. It is typically 2.0 mm (0.079 in) long and 1.2 mm (0.047 in) wide. Its spinnerets are white. Its legs are long and thin, light with black spots and numerous long pale spines; the last pair of legs are the longest. Its epigyne, the external visible part of its copulatory organs, has small depression to the rear. It has seminal ducts that are initially narrow, leading to spherical spermathecae. The spider has evident accessory glands. Unlike the male, distinguishing the species from others in the genus relies on comparing the copulatory organs. The presence of a shallow depression in the middle of epigyne and the small chambers at the start of the seminal ducts are distinctive for Asemonea stella.

== Behaviour ==
Despite being termed jumping spiders, Asemonea spiders rarely jump. Instead, they generally walk and run. They spin sheet webs on the underside of leaves, where they also lay their eggs. Predominantly diurnal hunters, the spiders feed mainly on insects. Although they will occasionally walk towards prey, they mainly lunged or leapt at prey, a leap often occurring 1 to 2 m (3 ft 3 in to 6 ft 7 in) away, a lunge usually closer. They use visual displays during courtship and transmit vibratory signals through silk to communicate to other spiders.

== Distribution and habitat ==
Asemonea species have a wide Species distribution, living across Africa, Asia and as far as Australia. Asemonea stella can be found in Kenya, South Africa and Tanzania, as well as Australia where it has been introduced. The male holotype was found in a garden in the Kenyan coastal town of Kilifi in 1977. A female paratype was discovered close by, in 1974, in hedges in open farmland about 180 m (600 ft) from the sea. The first examples from Tanzania were a female found in 1995 in a pitfall trap in scrub of Dichrostachys plants and a male discovered amongst grass in Senegalia senegal woodland in 1996. The first identification in South Africa was based on a specimen from the eastern shore of Shokwe Pan in the Ndumo Game Reserve collected in 2000, which demonstrated that the species thrives amongst semiaquatic vegetation. Its conservation status is considered of least concern.

Spiders, like Asemonea stella, can be transported by global trade networks over vast distances. As they are smaller than vertebrates, the spiders are less likely to be intentional travellers, usually travel as hitchhikers as part of the global trade in goods. As global trade has increased, so the number of introduced species has increased, not just in numbers but in distance travelled. Asemonea stella is one of those that has expanded beyond its natural habitat. The spider was found near Darwin, Australia, in 1965 and identified in 2000, the first example found in the country and the first time this spider has been seen outside Africa.
