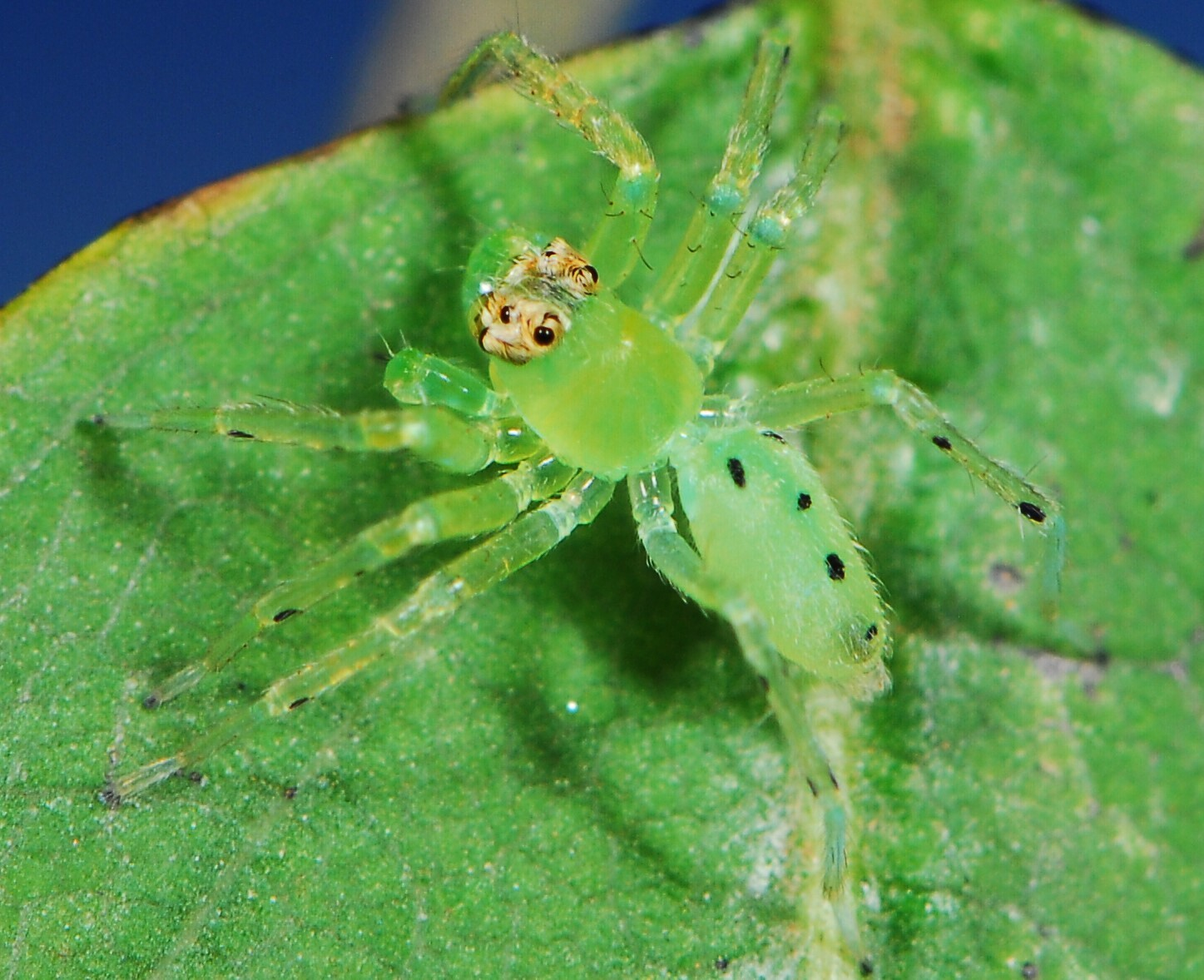
- Female
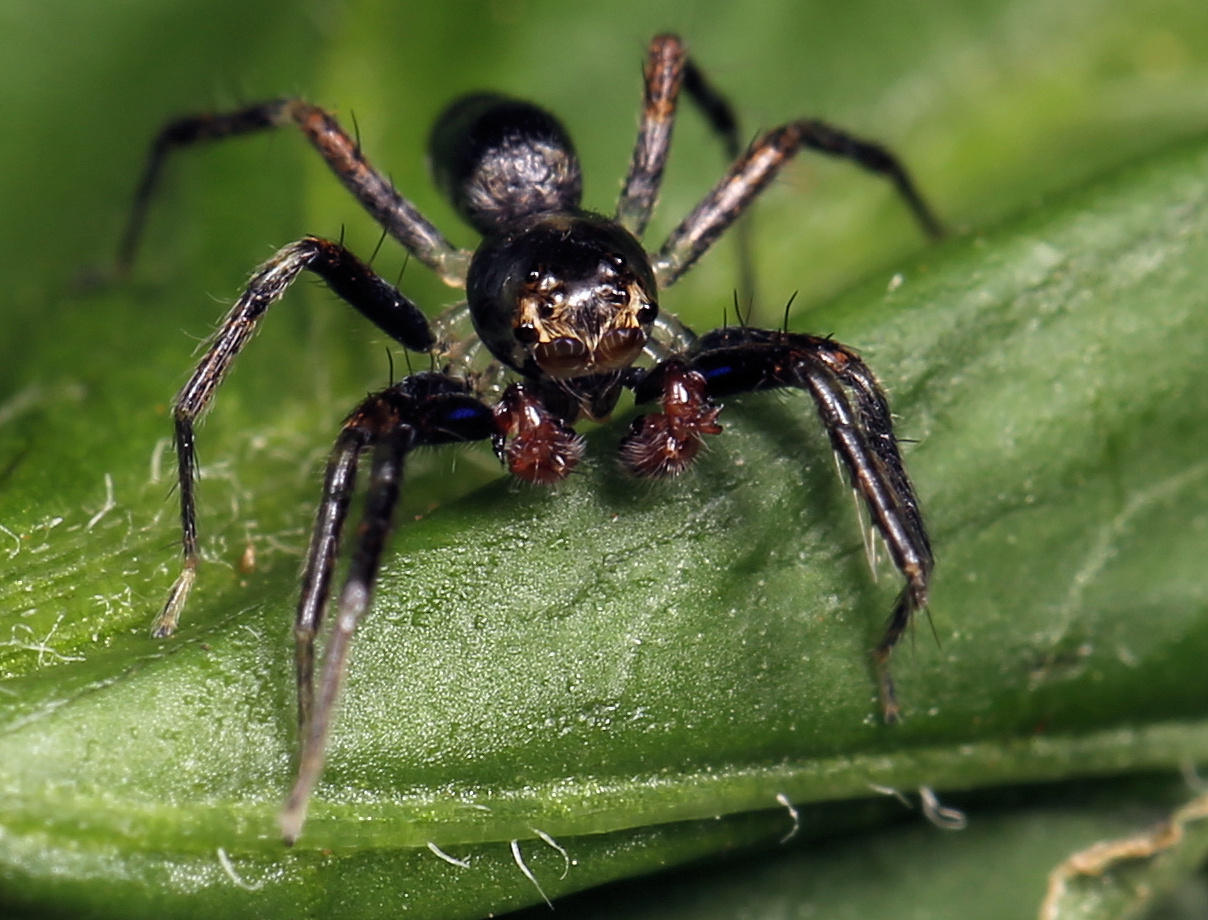
- Male

Scientific classification
- Kingdom: Animalia
- Phylum: Arthropoda
- Subphylum: Chelicerata
- Class: Arachnida
- Order: Araneae
- Infraorder: Araneomorphae
- Family: Salticidae
- Subfamily: Asemoneinae
- Genus: Asemonea
- Species: A. clara

Binomial name
- Asemonea clara Wesołowska & Haddad, 2013

= Asemonea clara =

Oribi Gorge Asemonea jumping spider

Species of jumping spider

Asemonea clara, the Oribi Gorge Asemonea jumping spider, is a species of jumping spider that lives in Mozambique and South Africa. It can be found in forests near the coast and in lowland areas. A member of the genus Asemonea, the spider is small, with a cephalothorax that is between 1.6 and 2.2 millimetres (0.063 and 0.087 inches) long and an abdomen that is between 1.8 and 2.4 mm (0.071 and 0.094 in) long, the male being smaller than the female. It has distinctive colouration, with the female being generally lime-green and the male black. The female has a white carapace that is pear-shaped, an abdomen that is white apart from two dark lines across the front, a small round dot in the middle and a black dot towards the back, and long thin white legs. The male is darker, apart from a creamy patch on its carapace, although some specimen have a grey abdomen that has black dots. Wanda Wesołowska and Charles Haddad first described the female in 2013, the male not being described until eleven years later in 2024.

== Etymology ==
The species has a name that is derived from the Latin for clear or plain.

== Taxonomy ==
The Oribi Gorge Asemonea Jumping Spider, or Asemonea clara, is an African jumping spider, a member of the family Salticidae. The male was first described by the arachnologists Wanda Wesołowska and Charles Haddad in 2013 and the female by Haddad, Konrad Wiśniewski and Wesołowska in 2024. It is one of over 500 species that Wesołowska identified during her career.

The species was allocated to the genus Asemonea, first raised by Octavius Pickard-Cambridge in 1869. The genus is related to Lyssomanes. Molecular analysis demonstrates that the genus is similar to Goleba and Pandisus. In Wayne Maddison's 2015 study of spider phylogenetic classification, the genus Asemonea was the type genus for the subfamily Asemoneinae. A year later, in 2016, Jerzy Prószyński named it as the type genus for the Asemoneines group of genera, which was also named after the genus.

== Description ==
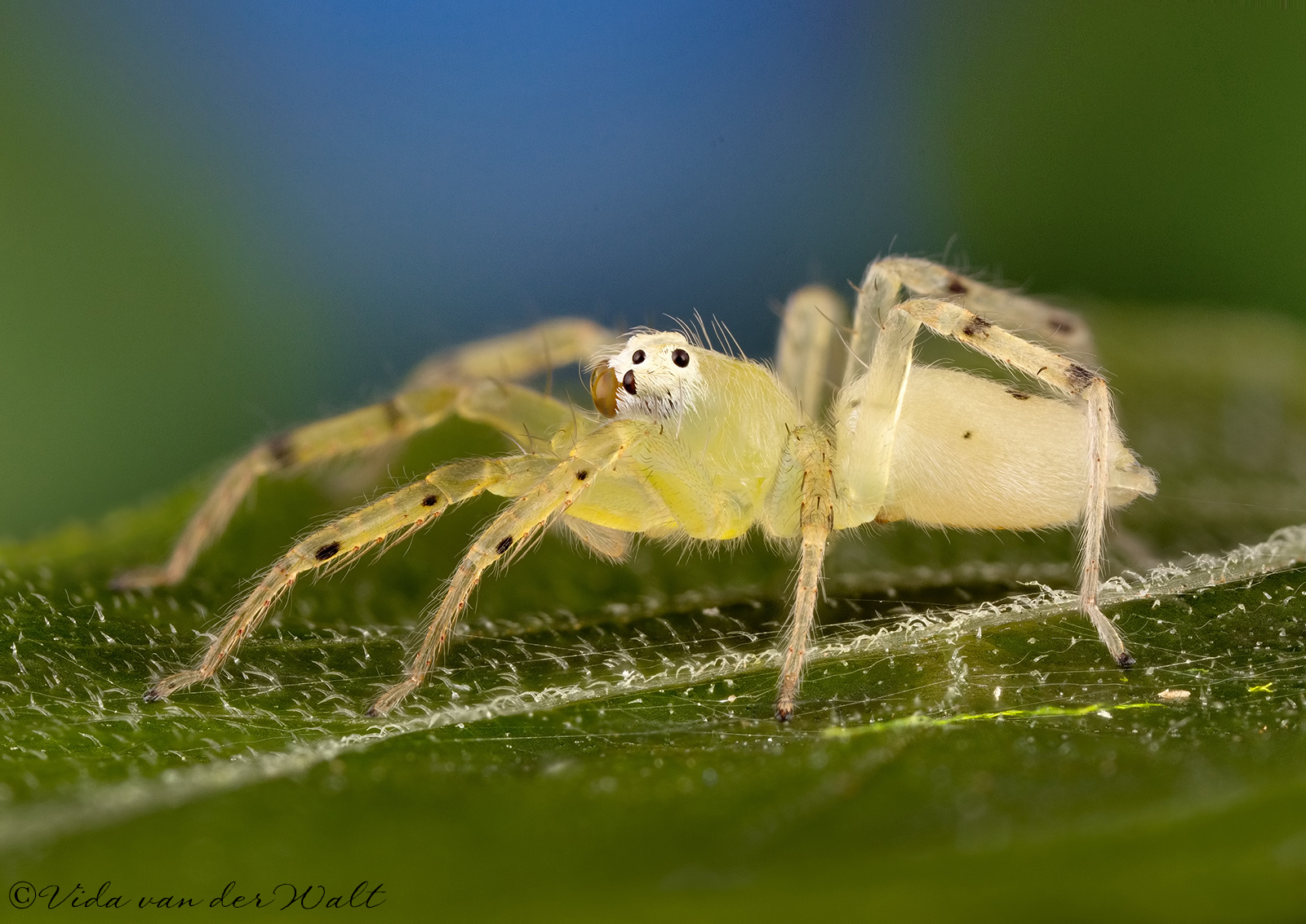
female

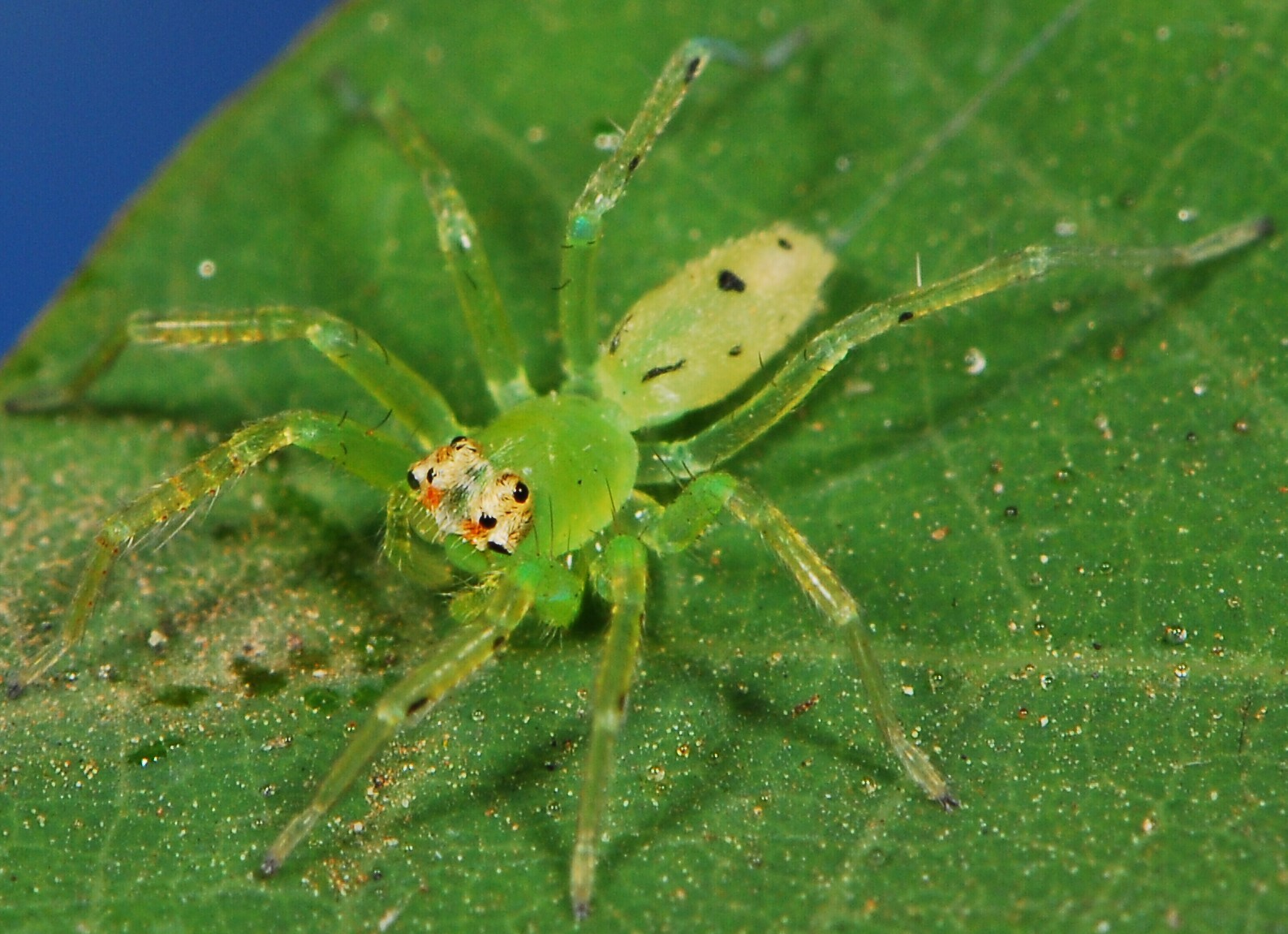
female

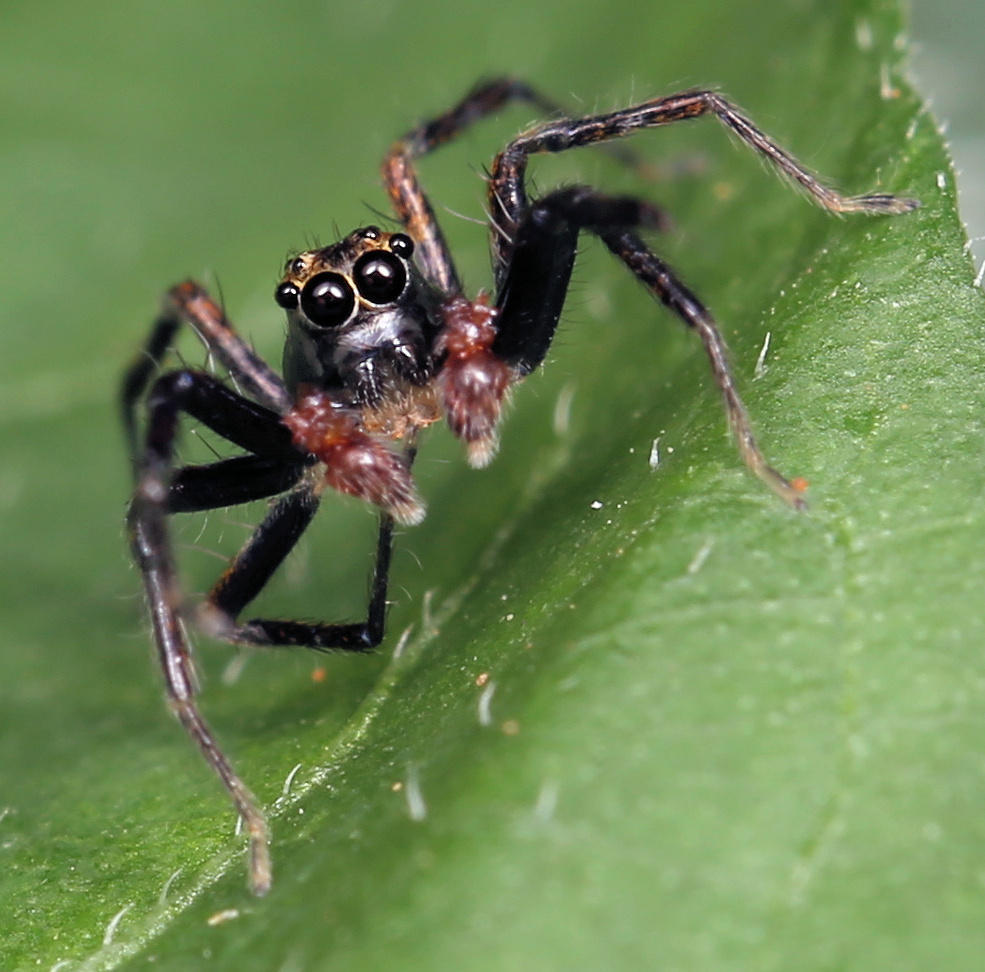
male from front

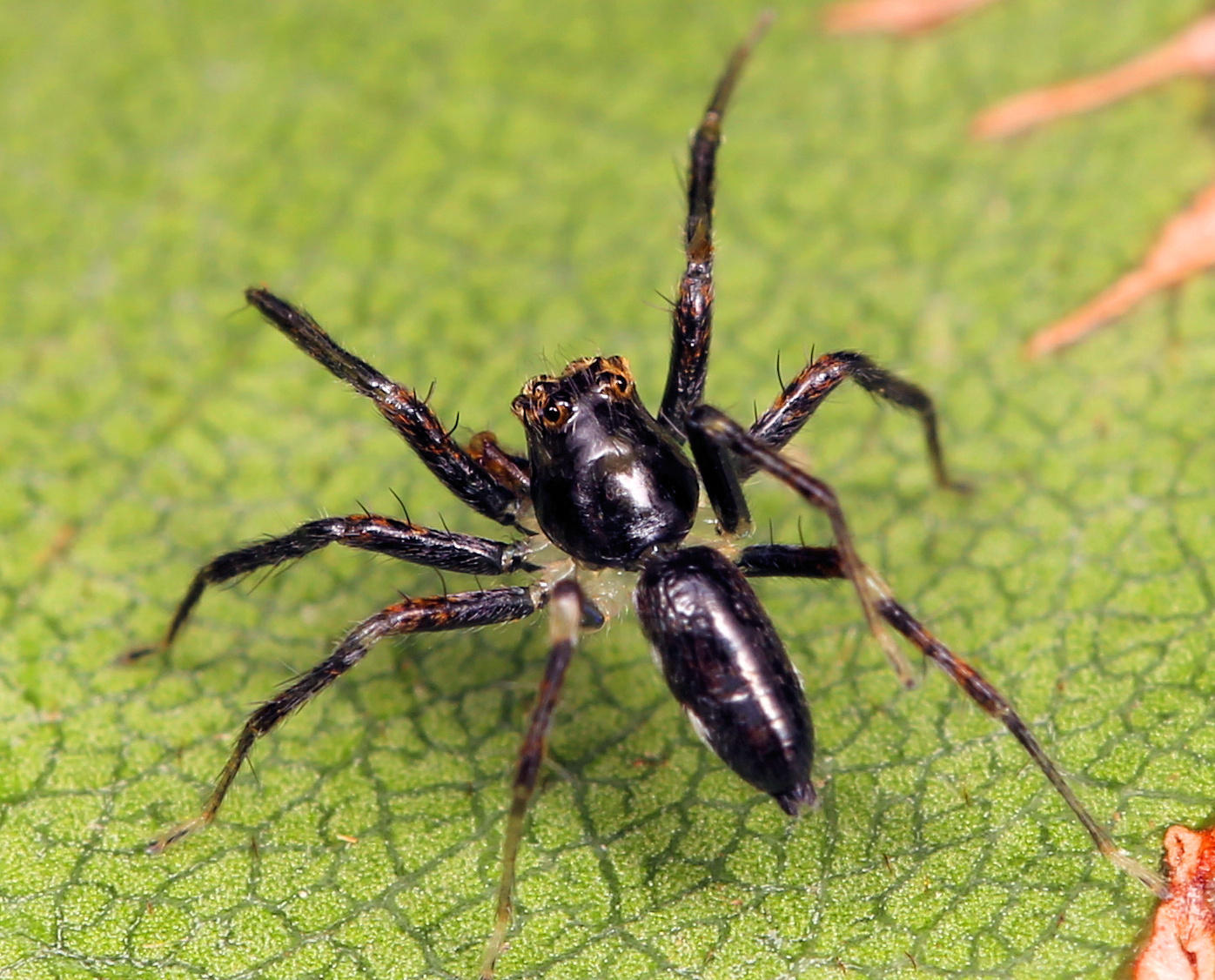
top view of male

The spider is small, with a body that is divided into two main parts, a cephalothorax and an abdomen. The female has a cephalothorax that is between 1.9 and 2.2 millimetres (0.075 and 0.087 inches) long and 1.3 and 1.4 mm (0.051 and 0.055 in) wide. It is generally lime-green. Its carapace, the hard upper part of the cephalothorax, is low, pear-shaped and whitish with black rings around the majority of the eyes, which are arranged in four rows, as is typical for the genus. The underside of its cephalothorax, or sternum, is pale. Its chelicerae are whitish-yellow, with two small teeth visible at the front and four at the back, and the remaining mouthparts are also pale.

The female's abdomen is rounded, between 2.2 and 2.4 mm (0.087 and 0.094 in) long and 1.2 and 1.4 mm (0.047 and 0.055 in) wide. It is white with a small round dot in the middle, black dot to the back and two dark lines across the front. The underside is also light. The spider has white spinnerets and long thin white legs, marked with black patches. Not only can the species be distinguished by its colour, its copulatory organs also unlike other members of the genus. The epigyne has a distinctive furrow down the middle and two large pockets. The seminal ducts and other internal copulatory organs are simple. There is evidence of sclerotization on both the epigyne and, to a lesser extent, channels that lie behind the furrow.

The male is shorter than the female. It has a cephalothorax that is between 1.6 and 1.8 mm (0.063 and 0.071 in) long and similarly wide to the female. Its carapace is also pear-shaped and blackish with a large creamy patch in the middle of the thorax. The spider's eye field is yellow with black rings around the eyes that, like the female, are raised up on tubercles. There are white hairs and long brown bristles near the eyes. Its sternum is creamy Its clypeus is high and black, its chelicerae are brown, and its mouthparts are creamy.

The male's abdomen is longer and narrower than its carapace, measuring between 1.8 and 2 mm (0.071 and 0.079 in) in length and between 0.8 and 0.9 mm (0.031 and 0.035 in) in width. It is generally black, although some spiders are lighter and have five round black patches on a grey background. Its spinnerets are greyish and its legs are long, thin and mainly black. They have long leg hairs and spines. Its pedipalps are light brown with a row of long dense hairs visible on the palpal tibia. The spider's cymbium is slightly larger than its tegulum, which has noticeable bulges to its side and bottom. Its embolus projects from the bottom and follows a path that goes over the tegulum. The palpal tibia has a three spikes, or tibial apophyses, one pointing upwards, one to the side and one downwards, the last having a forked end.

== Behaviour ==
Despite being termed jumping spiders, Asemonea spiders rarely jump. Instead, they generally walk and run. They spin sheet webs on the underside of leaves, where they also lay their eggs. Although predominantly a diurnal hunter, the spider is also likely to eat nectar if it is available. It uses visual displays during courtship and transmits vibratory signals through silk to communicate to other spiders. Two examples were found hanging from trees by silken threads.

== Distribution and habitat ==
Asemonea clara lives in Mozambique and South Africa. Initially, it was discovered in South Africa. The holotype was found in the Oribi Gorge Nature Reserve in 2011. Other examples have been found in Ndumo Game Reserve and near Port St Johns in Eastern Cape. It has also been seen living in Limpopo and Mpumalanga provinces. The first examples to be seen in Mozambique were found near Marracuene in 2007. It lives in both Gaza and Maputo Provinces. The spider predominantly lives in foliage in coastal and lowland forests.
