= Asemonea cuprea =

Scientific classification
- Kingdom: Animalia
- Phylum: Arthropoda
- Subphylum: Chelicerata
- Class: Arachnida
- Order: Araneae
- Infraorder: Araneomorphae
- Family: Salticidae
- Subfamily: Asemoneinae
- Genus: Asemonea
- Species: A. cuprea

Binomial name
- Asemonea cuprea Wesołowska, 2009

Species of spider

Asemonea cuprea is a species of jumping spider in the genus Asemonea that is found in South Africa and Zambia. The spider was first defined in 2009 by Wanda Wesołowska, one of over 500 that the arachnologist described during her career. It is small, generally yellow and lives on the leaves of short shrubs. It has a pear-shaped carapace and a narrower abdomen that each have a length between 1.5 and 1.7 mm (0.059 and 0.067 in). The male has a distinctive coloration with bright orange scales covering the clypeus and eye field and vivid orange hairs on the back half of the abdomen, which are recalled by the species name. The male also has an unusual right-angle shaped subtegulum and the female a simpler epigyne than other Asemonea species that helps identify the species.

== Taxonomy ==
Asemonea cuprea is a jumping spider first described by the Polish arachnologist Wanda Wesołowska in 2009, one of over 500 species she identified during her career. She allocated the species to the genus Asemonea, first raised by Octavius Pickard-Cambridge in 1869. The genus is related to Lyssomanes. Molecular analysis demonstrates that the genus is similar to Goleba and Pandisus.

In Wayne Maddison's 2015 study of spider phylogenetic classification, the genus Asemonea was the type genus for the subfamily Asemoneinae, split from Lyssomaninae. A year later, in 2016, Jerzy Prószyński named it as the type genus for the Asemoneines group of genera, which was also named after the genus. The species is closely related to Asemonea maculata, particularly in the structure of the male genitalia. The species name is derived from the Latin for copper and relates to the coloration of the male.

== Description ==
The spider is small, with a typical length between 4 and 5 mm (0.16 and 0.20 in). The male has a moderately high pear-shaped carapace that is typically 1.7 mm (0.067 in) long and 1.4 mm (0.055 in) wide. It is generally yellow, but the clypeus and eye field have a covering of bright orange scales. Black rings surround the eyes.

Typically for the genus, the eyes are arranged in four rows, the third row being particularly large. The clypeus is low. The labium is pale yellow and the chelicerae have two small teeth visible at the front and three at the back. The sternum is heart-shaped and whitish-yellow. The abdomen is generally yellow like the carapace, but slightly narrower, typically 1.5 mm (0.059 in) long and 0.8 mm (0.031 in) wide. It has a pattern on its back consisting of two blackish-grey lines down the middle and chevrons towards the back. Vivid orange hairs adorn the back half.

The underside is whitish. The spider has yellow spinnerets and long thin pale yellow legs that also have blackish markings. The legs are hairy and covered in spines. The pedipalps are complex. The palpal femur has a short furrow down the middle and a large corkscrew apophysis, or spike-like appendage. It has a large ventral tibial apophysis and a long tipped dorsal apophysis. The cymbium is unusually narrow. The embolus is thin and encircles the rounded tegulum. The spermophore is meandering.

The female is smaller than the male, with a carapace that is typically 1.5 mm (0.059 in) long and 1.1 mm (0.043 in) wide and an abdomen typically 1.7 mm (0.067 in) in length and 0.8 mm (0.031 in) in width. It is similar to the male in shape, apart from the narrower carapace. The carapace is generally brown, tending to orange towards the edges, but lacks the characteristic bright orange scales of the male. The eye field is dark, nearly black. The abdomen differs from the male in the lack of orange hairs. It is not unusual for the males of the genus to be less ornate that the females.

The epigyne is slightly sclerotized with two depressions within a central furrow. The gonopores are hidden in sclerotized cup-like regions. Internally, the structure is simple with long thin seminal ducts leading to nearly-spherical receptacles.

The spider is typical for the genus. The male can be distinguished from other species by its bright orange scales and the orange hair on the back half of its abdomen. It also has a long dorsal spike on its palpal tibia and an unusual right-angle shaped subtegulum. The female can be differentiated from other Asemonea spiders by the very simple structure of its epigyne. These contrast heavily with the complex design of other species like Asemonea flava.

== Behaviour ==
Despite being termed jumping spiders, members of the genus Asemonea rarely jump. Instead, they generally walk and run. They spin sheet webs on the underside of leaves, where they also lay their eggs. Although predominantly a diurnal hunter, the spider is also likely to eat nectar.

== Distribution and habitat ==
Asemonea cuprea was first discovered in Zambia. The holotype and paratype of the species were found in Wildlives Game Farm near the Choma in 2006. It has also been identified in KwaZulu-Natal, South Africa. This wide range is unusual for the genus, as most species are only found in one locality, although this may be related to the lack of observed examples reported. The spiders are found on the leaves of short shrubs.
