= Gambaquezonia =

Scientific classification
- Kingdom: Animalia
- Phylum: Arthropoda
- Subphylum: Chelicerata
- Class: Arachnida
- Order: Araneae
- Infraorder: Araneomorphae
- Family: Salticidae
- Subfamily: Salticinae
- Genus: Gambaquezonia; Barrion & Litsinger, 1995

Species
- See text.

Genus of spiders

Gambaquezonia is a genus of the spider family Salticidae (jumping spiders) with two species. It was first described in some detail by Barrion & Litsinger (1995) from the female holotype, the only known specimen at the time. Its general appearance was later redescribed by Murphy and Murphy (2000).

== Species ==
G. itimana is a long green jumping spider, similar and probably related to Orthrus and Asemonea. The female is 6 mm long. The carapace is pale yellow, with a black band surrounding the eyes and reaching to the rear margin. The yellow abdomen features some longitudinal grey stripes and a wide black band, followed by two lateral black spots. The legs are yellow, with dark stripes on some segments. It was described from a single collected female found in rice fields of Luzon Island on the Philippines.

The female has several unusual morphological features, including a large number of ventral macrosetae on legs I and II, prominent sparse rows of elongate setae on the dorsum, a multi-cusped retromarginal tooth, and an epigynum, superficially this looks like a euophryine, but is quite different structurally.

The other species, G. curioi, was documented by Freudenschuss, Grabolle & Krehenwinkel in 2016, found in the Philippines.
