= Asemonea mirpurensis =

Scientific classification
- Kingdom: Animalia
- Phylum: Arthropoda
- Subphylum: Chelicerata
- Class: Arachnida
- Order: Araneae
- Infraorder: Araneomorphae
- Family: Salticidae
- Subfamily: Asemoneinae
- Genus: Asemonea
- Species: A. mirpurensis

Binomial name
- Asemonea mirpurensis Jahan & Biswas, 2021

Species of spider

Asemonea mirpurensis is a species of spider from the family Salticidae. It is native to Bangladesh.
