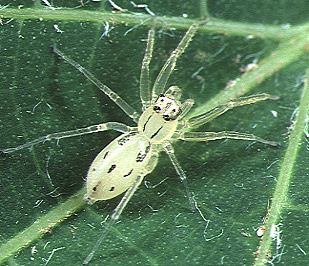
- A spider of the Asemonea genus

Scientific classification
- Kingdom: Animalia
- Phylum: Arthropoda
- Subphylum: Chelicerata
- Class: Arachnida
- Order: Araneae
- Infraorder: Araneomorphae
- Family: Salticidae
- Subfamily: Asemoneinae
- Genus: Asemonea
- Species: A. flava

Binomial name
- Asemonea flava Wesołowska, 2001

= Asemonea flava =

Species of spider

Asemonea flava is a species of jumping spider in the genus Asemonea that is endemic to Kenya. The spider was first defined in 2001 by Wanda Wesołowska, one of over 500 that the arachnologist described during her career. The spider is small, with a yellow carapace and abdomen each typically 2.2 mm (0.087 in) long, although the abdomen is narrower and lighter. The female has spines on its palpal tibia and a distinctive epigyne that with a complex internal structure with helical receptacles. The male has not been described.

== Taxonomy ==
Asemonea flava is a jumping spider that was first described by the Polish arachnologist Wanda Wesołowska in 2001, one of over 500 species she identified during her career. The species was allocated to the genus Asemonea, first raised by Octavius Pickard-Cambridge in 1869. The genus is related to Lyssomanes. Molecular analysis demonstrates that the genus is similar to Goleba and Pandisus. In Wayne Maddison's 2015 study of spider phylogenetic classification, the genus Asemonea was the type genus for the subfamily Asemoneinae. A year later, in 2016, Jerzy Prószyński named it as the type genus for the Asemoneines group of genera, which was also named after the genus. The species itself has a name that is derived from the Latin for yellow.

== Description ==
The spider is small. The female has a moderately high elongated carapace that is typically 2.2 mm (0.087 in) long and 1.4 mm (0.055 in) wide. It is yellow with a whitish eye field. Typically for the genus, the eyes arranged in two rows. The chelicerae are whitish-yellow, with two small teeth visible at the front and three at the back. The abdomen is similar in shape to the carapace but narrower, typically 2.2 mm (0.087 in) long and 1.1 mm (0.043 in) wide, and a lighter yellow. It has light spinnerets and long thin yellow legs. The pedipalps are light brown. There are spines on the palpal tibia. The epigyne is an oval with a large depression towards the front and a raised part towards middle. This is a distinguishing feature of the species. The seminal ducts are initially very wide, narrowing as the wend their way to the receptacles, which are a complex of coiled helixes. The male has not been described.

== Behaviour ==
The spider is typical of the genus. Asemonea spiders rarely jump. Instead, they generally walk and run. They spin sheet webs on the underside of leaves, where they also lay their eggs. Although predominantly a diurnal hunter, the spider is also likely to eat nectar if it is available.

== Distribution and habitat ==
The species is endemic to Kenya. The holotype was found on Mount Elgon in 1937 at an altitude of 2,350 m (7,710 ft) above sea level. It thrives in mountainous areas.
