= Macopaeus =

Scientific classification
- Kingdom: Animalia
- Phylum: Arthropoda
- Subphylum: Chelicerata
- Class: Arachnida
- Order: Araneae
- Infraorder: Araneomorphae
- Family: Salticidae
- Subfamily: Asemoneinae
- Genus: Macopaeus; Simon, 1900
- Species: M. spinosus

Binomial name
- Macopaeus spinosus Simon, 1900

Genus of spiders

Macopaeus is a genus of jumping spiders endemic to Madagascar. It contains only one species, Macopaeus spinosus. Two other species (M. celebensis Merian, 1911 and M. madagascarensis Peckham & Peckham, 1903) were described in this genus in the early 20th century. However, these were transferred to the genus Brettus in 1980.
