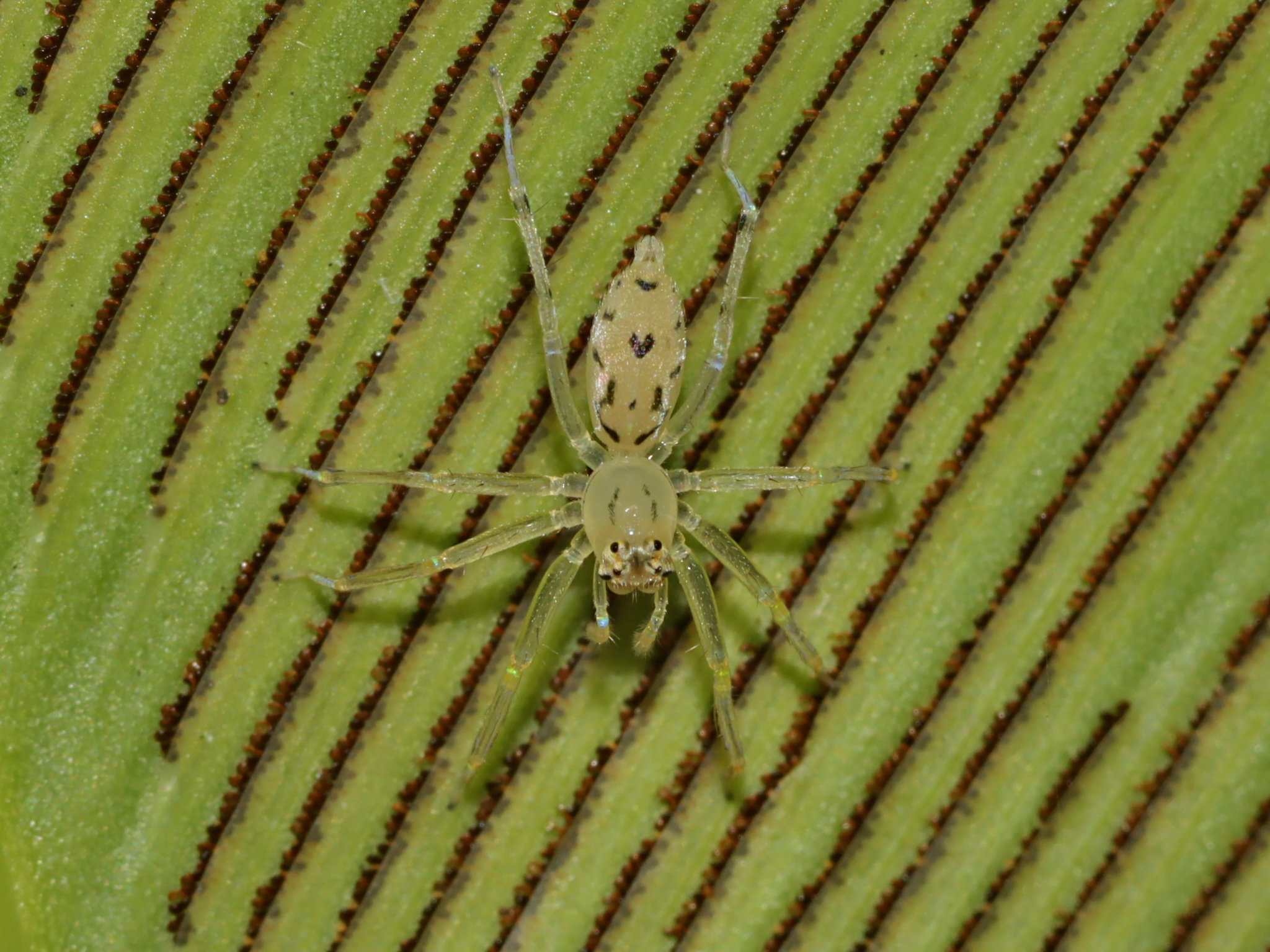
- Female from Thailand
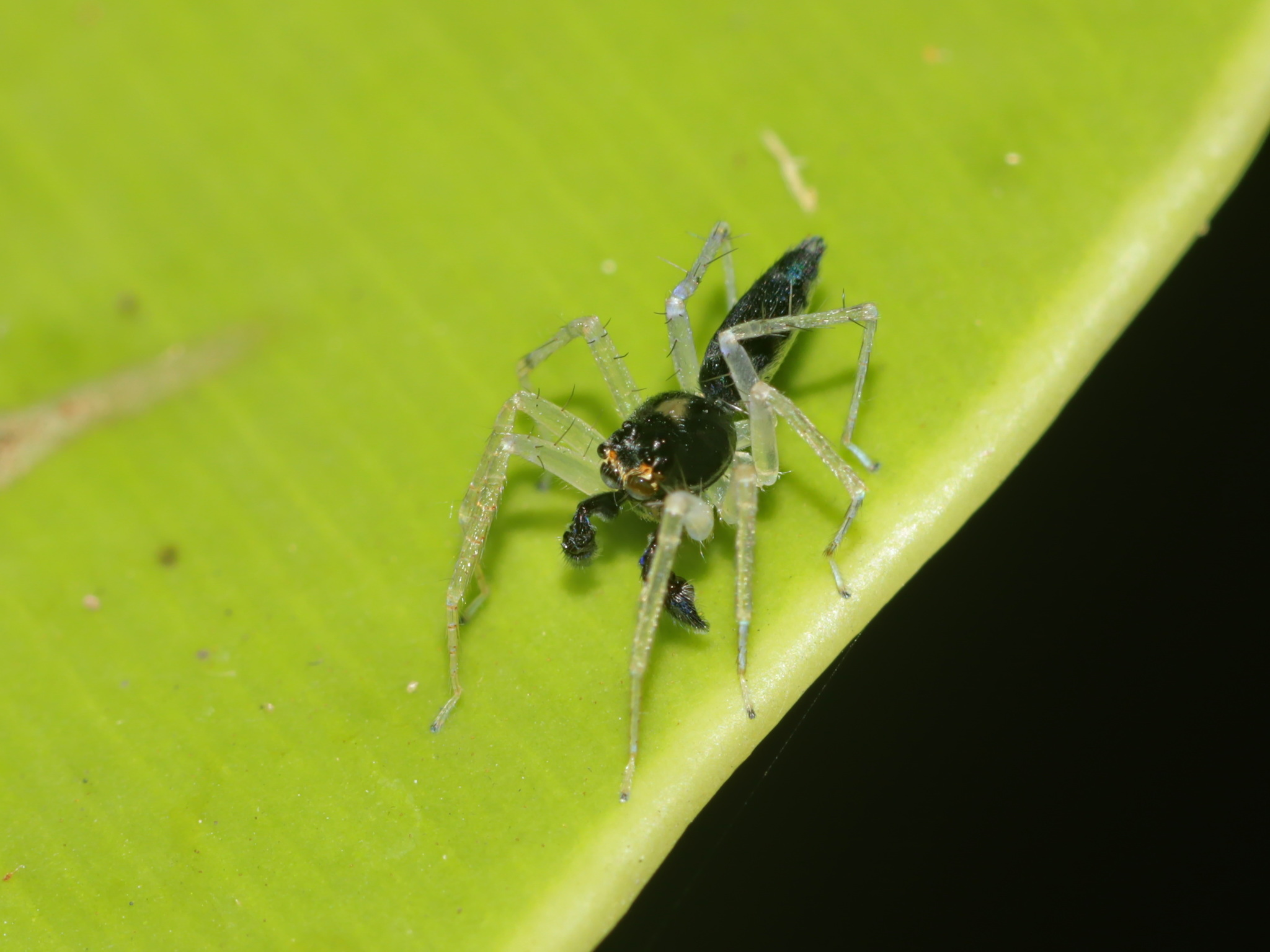
- Male from Thailand

Scientific classification
- Kingdom: Animalia
- Phylum: Arthropoda
- Subphylum: Chelicerata
- Class: Arachnida
- Order: Araneae
- Infraorder: Araneomorphae
- Family: Salticidae
- Subfamily: Asemoneinae
- Genus: Asemonea
- Species: A. cristata

Binomial name
- Asemonea cristata Thorell, 1895

Synonyms
- Asemonea picta Thorell, 1895; Lyssomanes santinagarensis Biswas & Biswas, 1992; Asemonea santinagarensis (Biswas & Biswas, 1992)

= Asemonea cristata =

Species of jumping spider

Asemonea cristata is a species of jumping spider of the genus Asemonea. It is found in India and Myanmar.

== Taxonomy ==
Asemonea cristata was originally described by Tamerlan Thorell in 1895 from a single male specimen collected from Tharrawaddy in Burma (now Myanmar). Thorell also described Asemonea picta from the same locality based on two female specimens, suspecting it might be conspecific with A. cristata.

In 1992, Biswas & Biswas described Lyssomanes santinagarensis from a single female collected from Santinagar district in West Bengal, India. This species was later transferred to the genus Asemonea by Logunov in 2004. A detailed re-examination in 2020 revealed that all three species shared identical diagnostic characteristics, leading to the synonymization of A. picta and A. santinagarensis with A. cristata.

== Distribution ==
Asemonea cristata has been recorded from India and Myanmar. In India, it is known from Kerala and West Bengal. The species appears to be rare, with only three specimens collected during a three-year spider survey in the Wayanad Wildlife Sanctuary compared to 120 specimens of the related A. tenuipes.

== Description ==
Asemonea cristata is a small jumping spider with distinctive sexual dimorphism in coloration and size.

=== Females ===
Females are larger than males, measuring approximately 4.22 mm in body length. The cephalothorax is creamy-yellow with black longitudinal markings extending from leg segments II to IV, while the mediolateral longitudinal streaks are more straightened than in males. The clypeus is creamy-white and covered with long white hairs. The chelicerae are light yellow, and the mouth parts (pedipalps, labium) are creamy-yellow. The opisthosoma is creamy-white and more robust than in males, featuring anterolateral longitudinal irregular markings that form an inverted V-shaped patch with a round black spot. The legs are light yellowish with black mottling on all tibia.

The female epigyne is distinctive, featuring a dark, highly sclerotized wide U-shaped projection with lateral concave depressions below the projection. The internal structure includes separated spermathecae and an insemination duct with four loops.

=== Males ===
Males are smaller, measuring approximately 3.82 mm in body length. The cephalothorax is pear-shaped, moderately high, and greenish brown with light brown hairs. The thorax has a pair of black longitudinal curved streaks with pale yellow spaces between them. The clypeus is greenish brown, about half the diameter of the anterior median eyes, and covered with white fine hairs. The abdomen is slender, ovoid, and light green, covered with black and light brown hairs and featuring thick irregular black longitudinal markings.

The male can be easily distinguished from related species by the shape of the palpal femoral apophysis, which is ramified with a stout basal region and appears almost fork-like in retrolateral view. The dorsal tibial apophysis features two distinctive peg-like spines.
