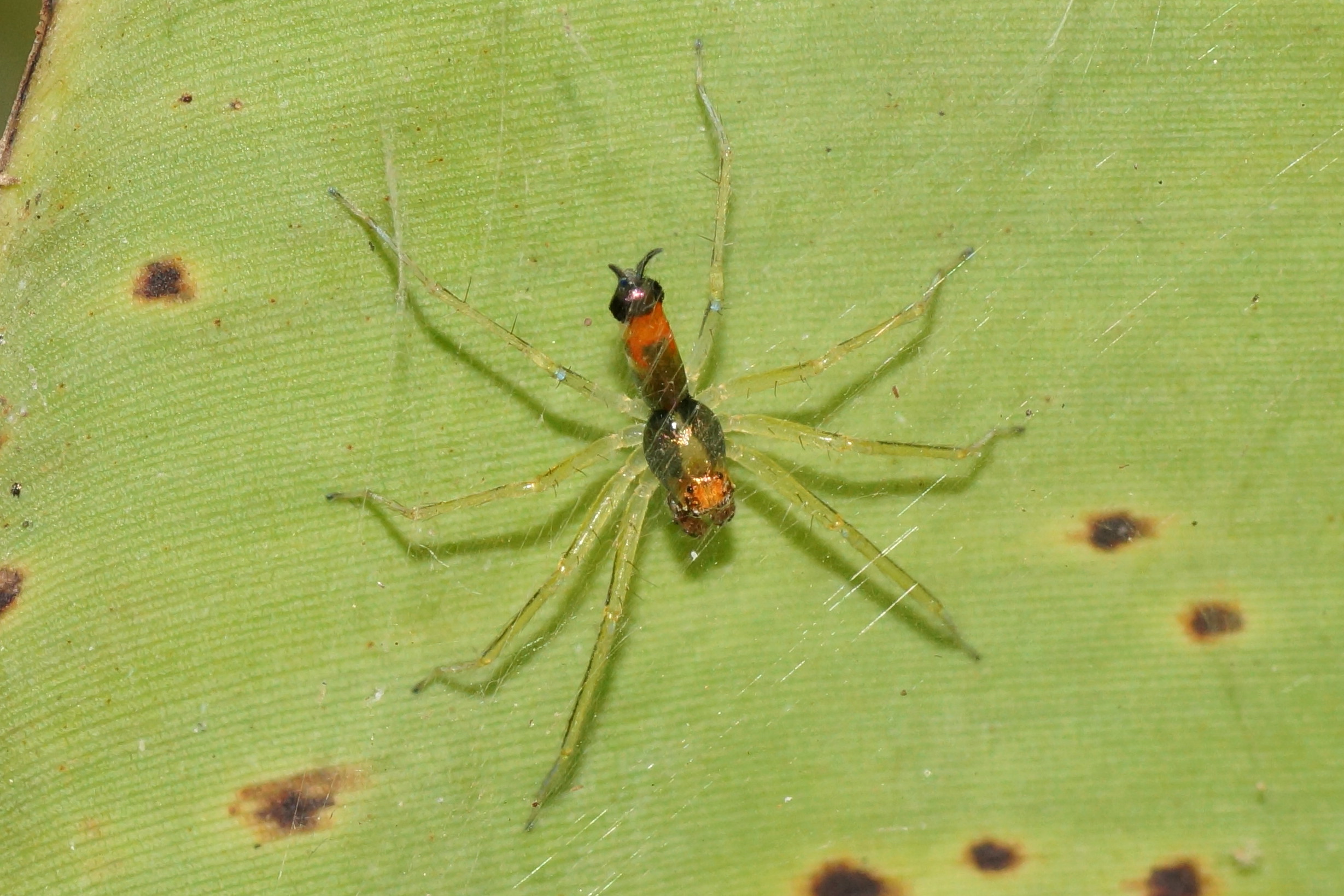
- Female

Scientific classification
- Kingdom: Animalia
- Phylum: Arthropoda
- Subphylum: Chelicerata
- Class: Arachnida
- Order: Araneae
- Infraorder: Araneomorphae
- Family: Salticidae
- Subfamily: Asemoneinae
- Genus: Asemonea
- Species: A. tenuipes

Binomial name
- Asemonea tenuipes (O. Pickard-Cambridge, 1869)

Synonyms
- Lyssomanes tenuipes O. Pickard-Cambridge, 1869; Asemonea cingulata Thorell, 1895; Lyssomanes andamanensis Tikader, 1977; Lyssomanes bengalensis Tikader & Biswas, 1978

= Asemonea tenuipes =

Species of spider

Asemonea tenuipes is a species of Salticidae (jumping spiders) which can be found on Andaman Islands and in such countries as Burma, India, Sri Lanka, and Thailand. It is commonly referred to as tailed jumper.

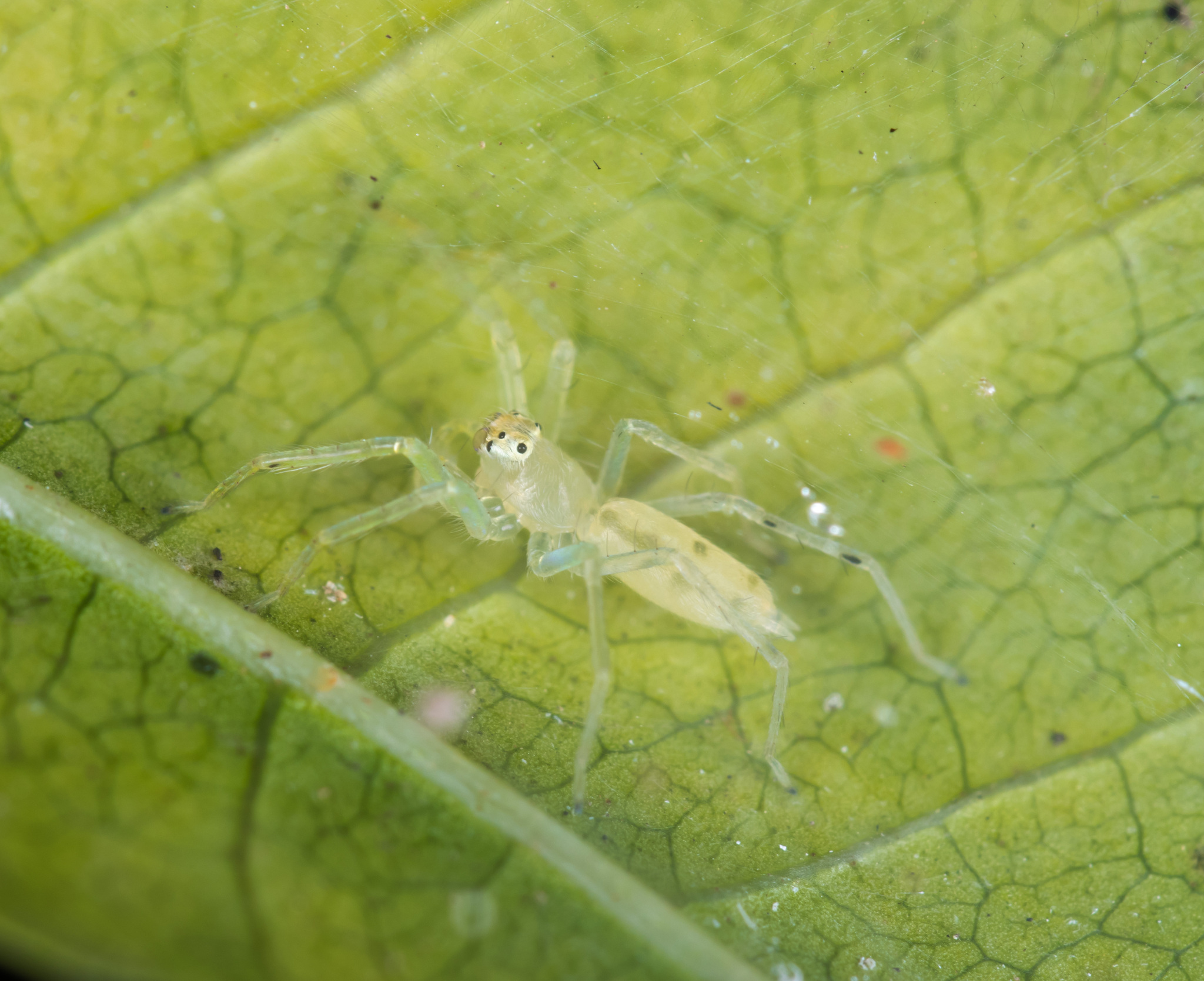
A. tenuipes under web on underside of leaf, Thailand
