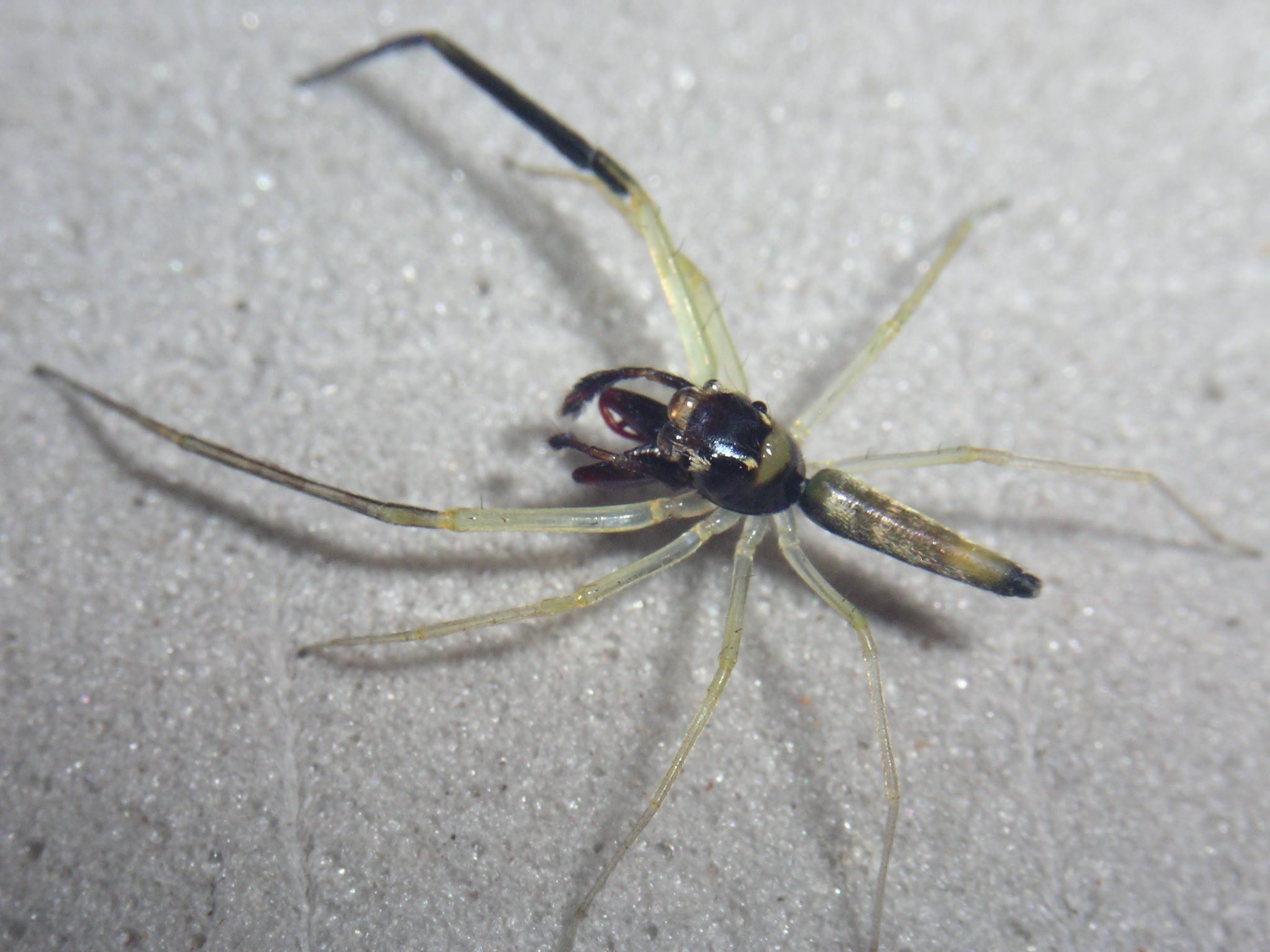
- Male Orthrus sp. in Malaysia

Scientific classification
- Kingdom: Animalia
- Phylum: Arthropoda
- Subphylum: Chelicerata
- Class: Arachnida
- Order: Araneae
- Infraorder: Araneomorphae
- Family: Salticidae
- Subfamily: Salticinae
- Genus: Orthrus; Simon, 1900

Type species
- O. bicolor Simon, 1900

Species
- 4, see text

= Orthrus (spider) =

Genus of spiders

Orthrus is a genus of Southeast Asian jumping spiders that was first described by Eugène Louis Simon in 1900. The name is derived from a two-headed dog in Greek mythology.

== Species ==
As of August 2019 it contains four species, found only in Indonesia and the Philippines:

- Orthrus bicolor Simon, 1900 (type) – Philippines
- Orthrus calilungae Barrion, 1998 – Philippines
- Orthrus muluensis Wanless, 1980 – Borneo
- Orthrus palawanensis Wanless, 1980 – Philippines
