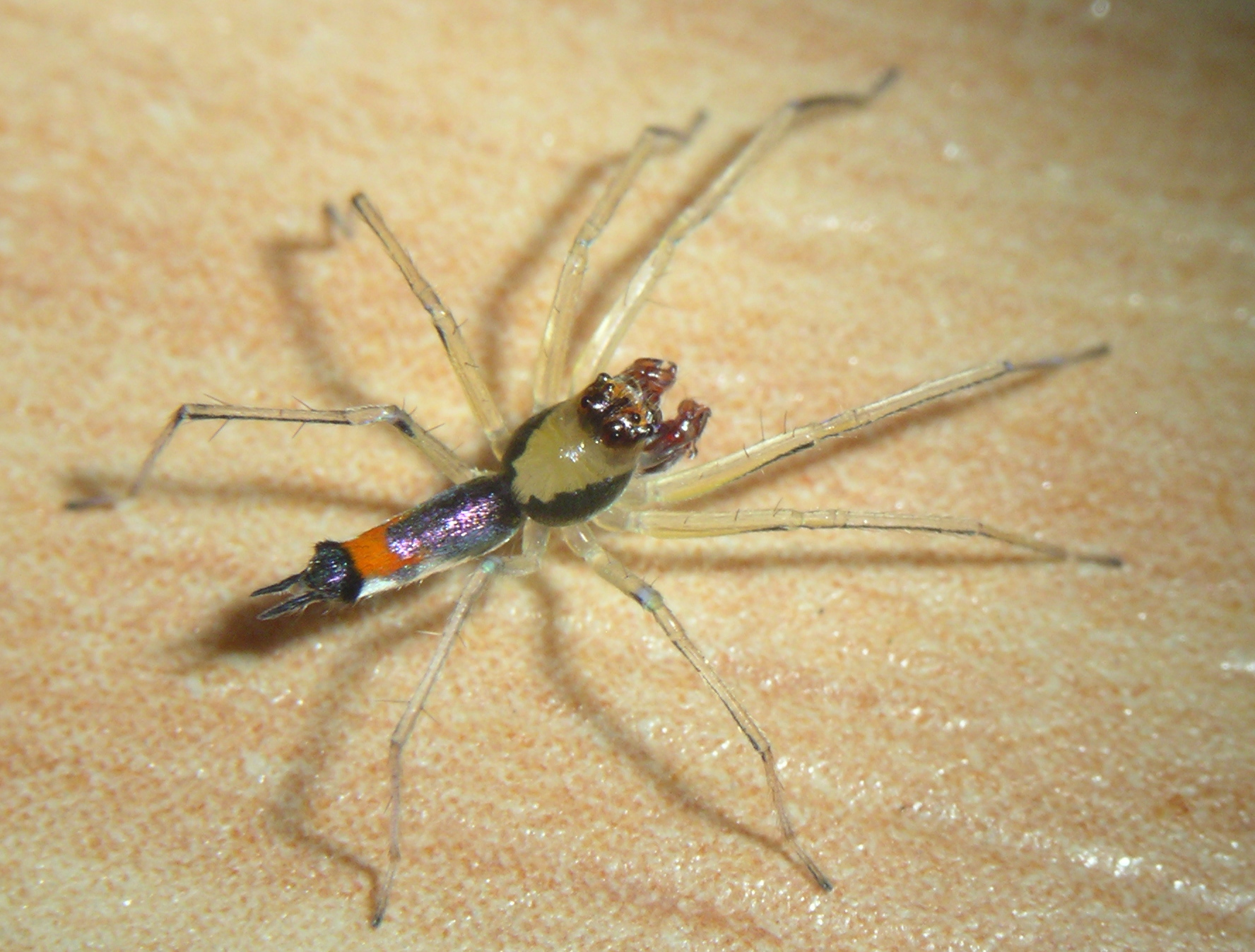
- Male A. tenuipes
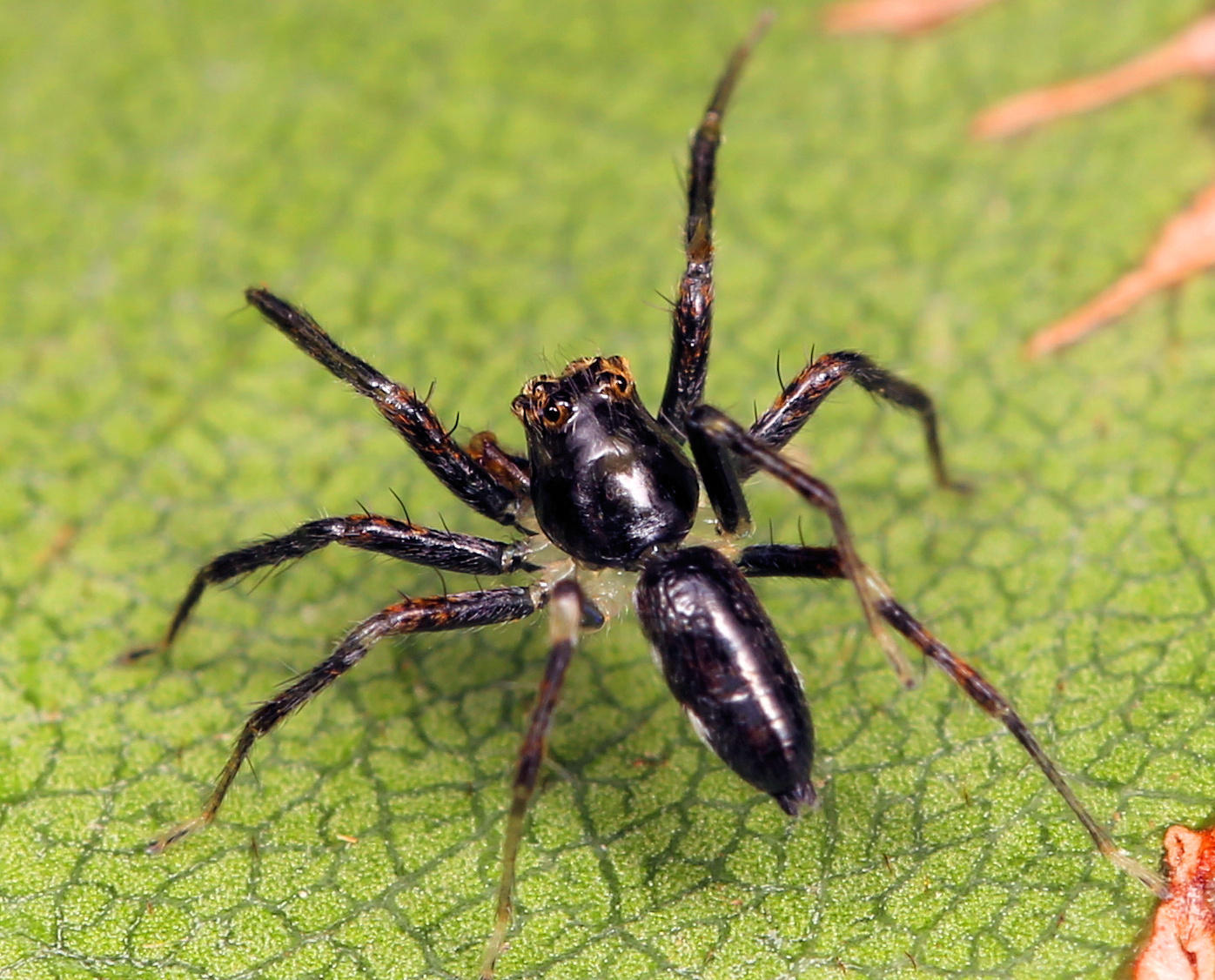
- Male A. clara

Scientific classification
- Kingdom: Animalia
- Phylum: Arthropoda
- Subphylum: Chelicerata
- Class: Arachnida
- Order: Araneae
- Infraorder: Araneomorphae
- Family: Salticidae
- Subfamily: Asemoneinae
- Genus: Asemonea; O. Pickard-Cambridge, 1869

Type species
- A. tenuipes (O. Pickard-Cambridge, 1869)

Species
- 26, see text

= Asemonea =

Genus of spiders

Asemonea is a genus of jumping spiders that was first described by Octavius Pickard-Cambridge in 1869.

== Distribution ==
Spiders in this genus are native to Asia and Africa. One species has been introduced to Queensland, Australia.

== Description ==
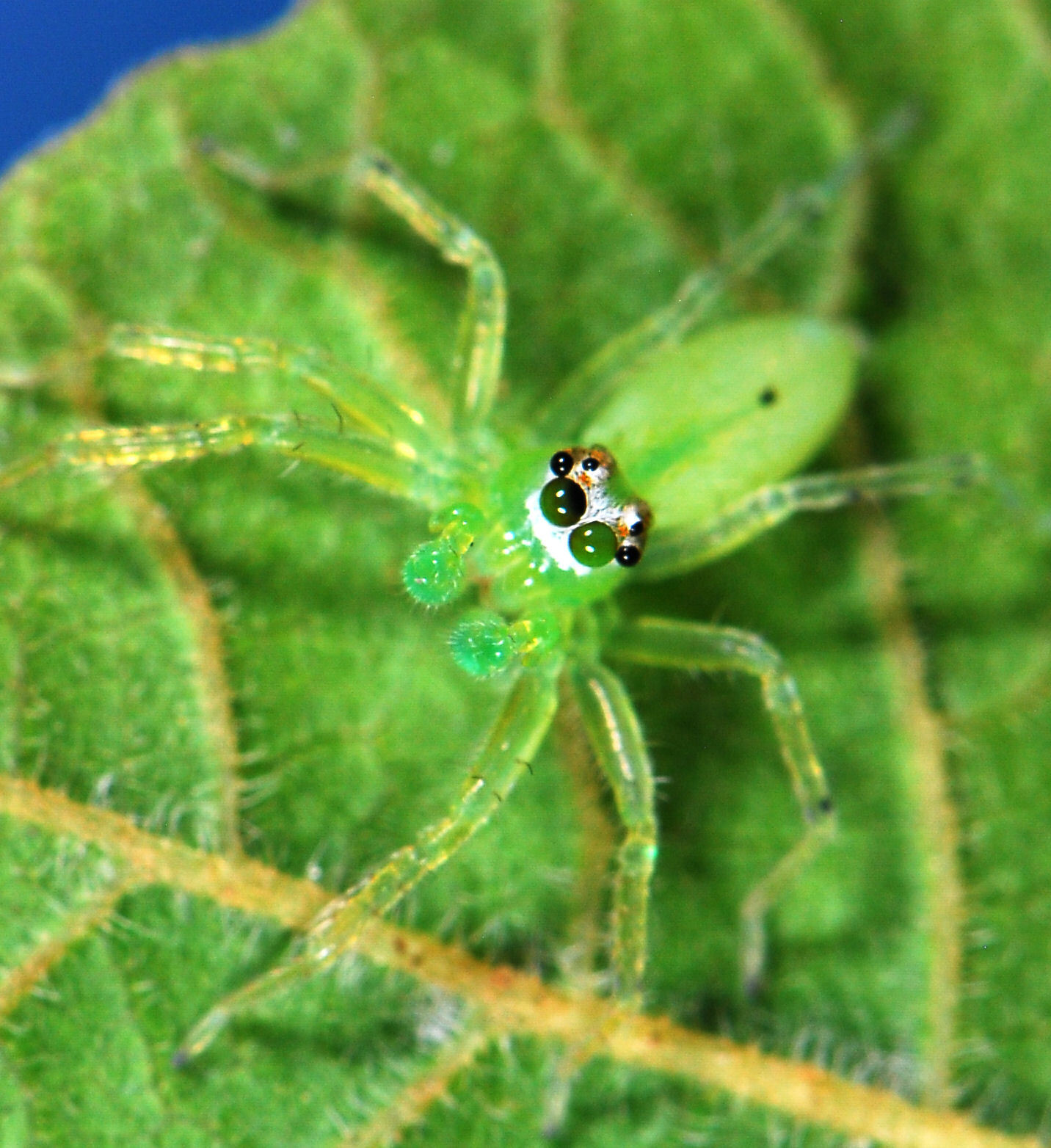
male A. murphyae from South Africa

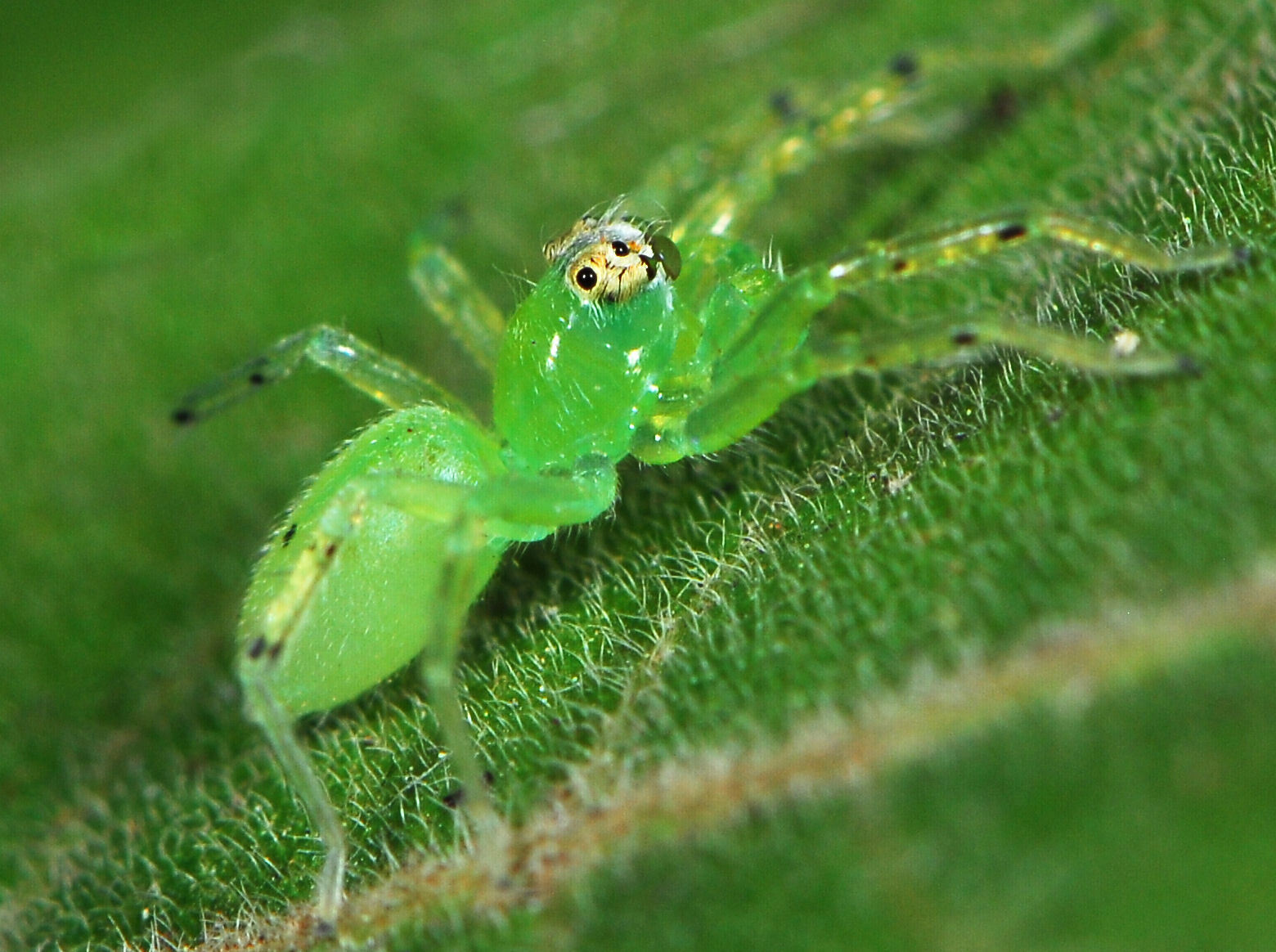
lateral view

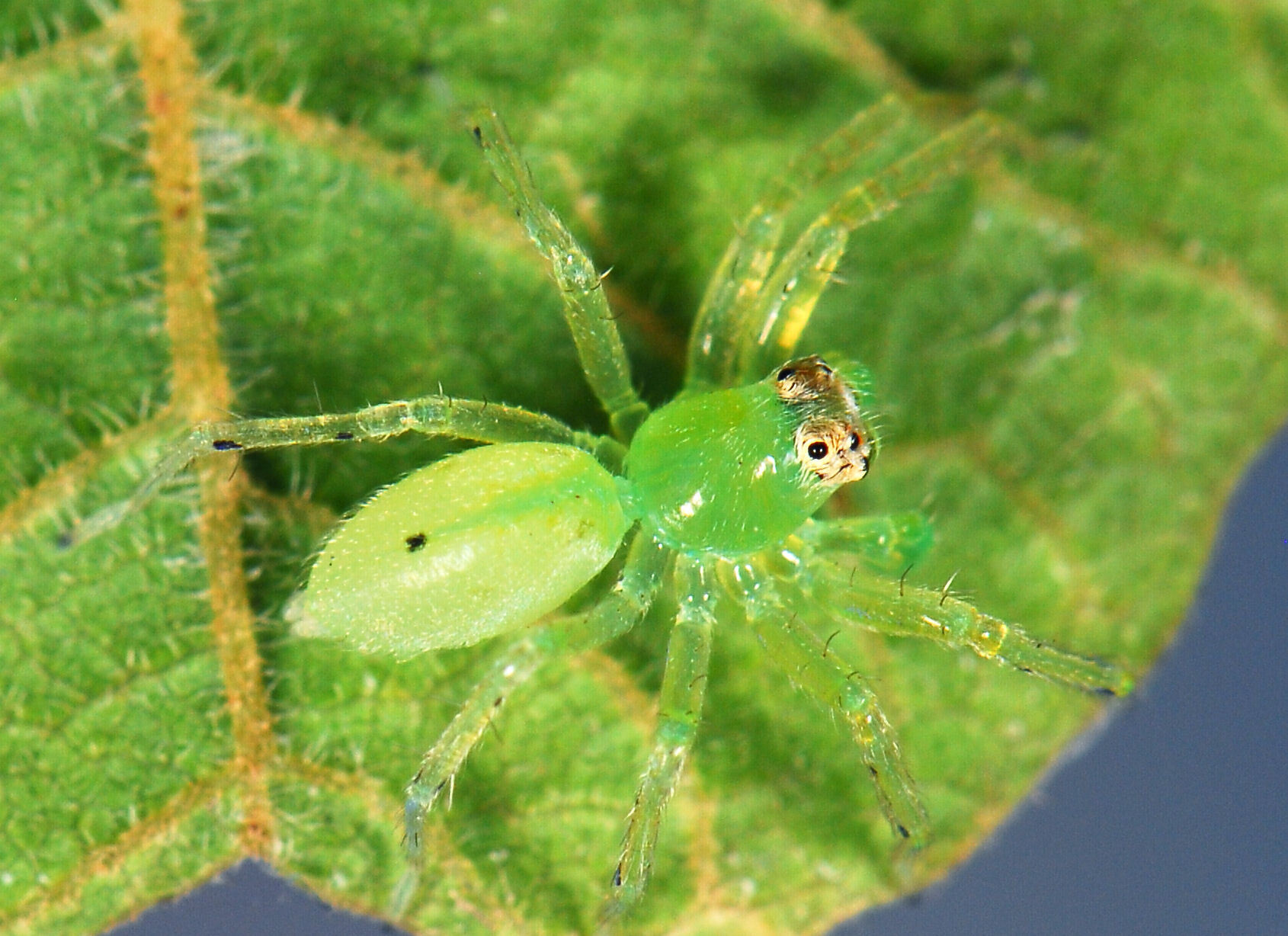
dorsal view

These spiders have green or yellowish elongate bodies that are sometimes translucent. They are small to medium spiders, with sexes alike in general habitus, though sexual dimorphism is sometimes evident in colouration and markings, and males may have ornate fringes. Species have distinctive colour patterns.

The carapace is longer than broad, moderately high, with an elevated eye region, widest at the posterior margin of coxae II. The fovea is long. Eyes are set on moderately well-developed tubercles, arranged in three transverse rows, grouped near the front of the carapace. Frequent changes in eye colour can be witnessed.

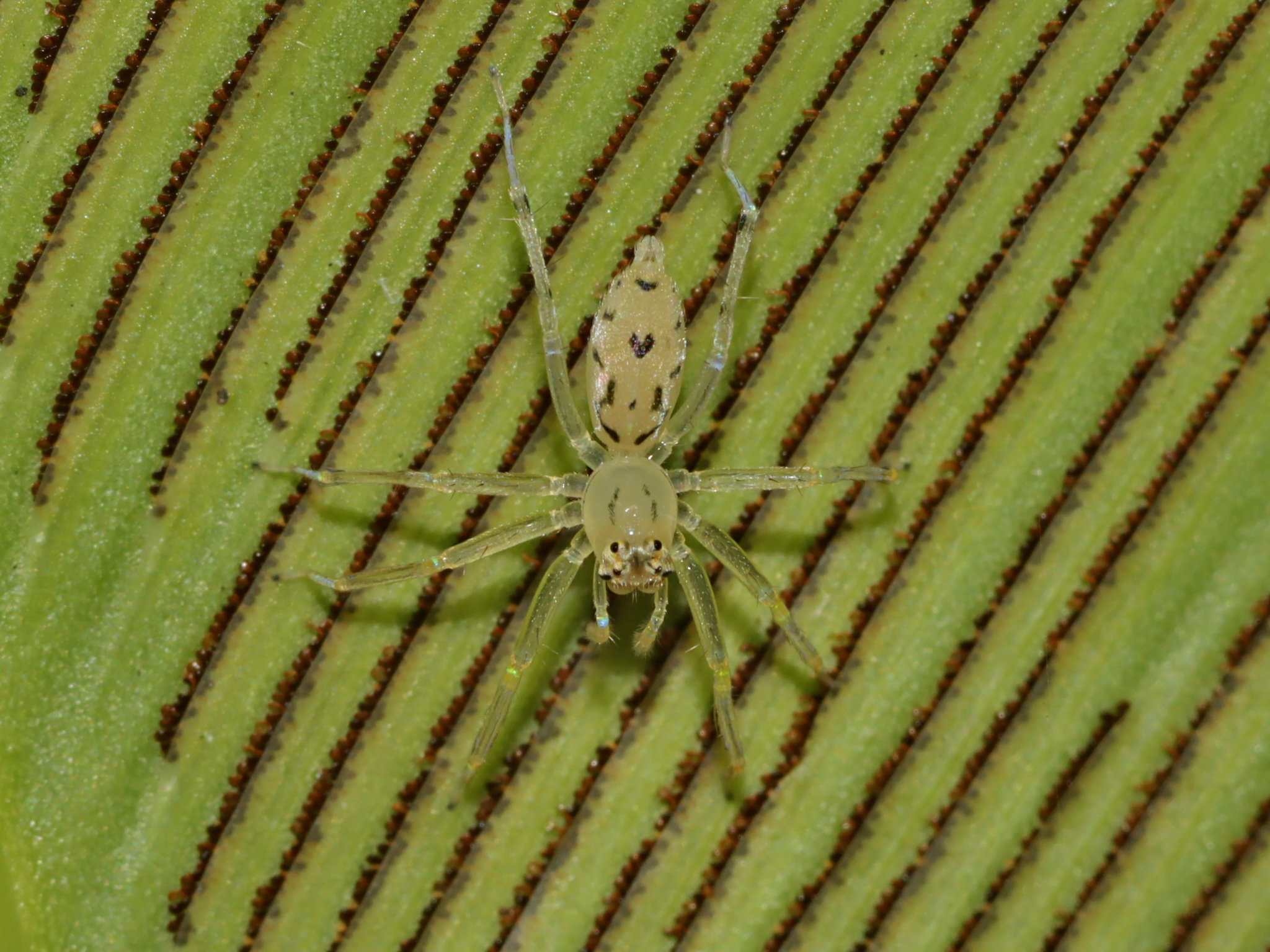
female A. cristata

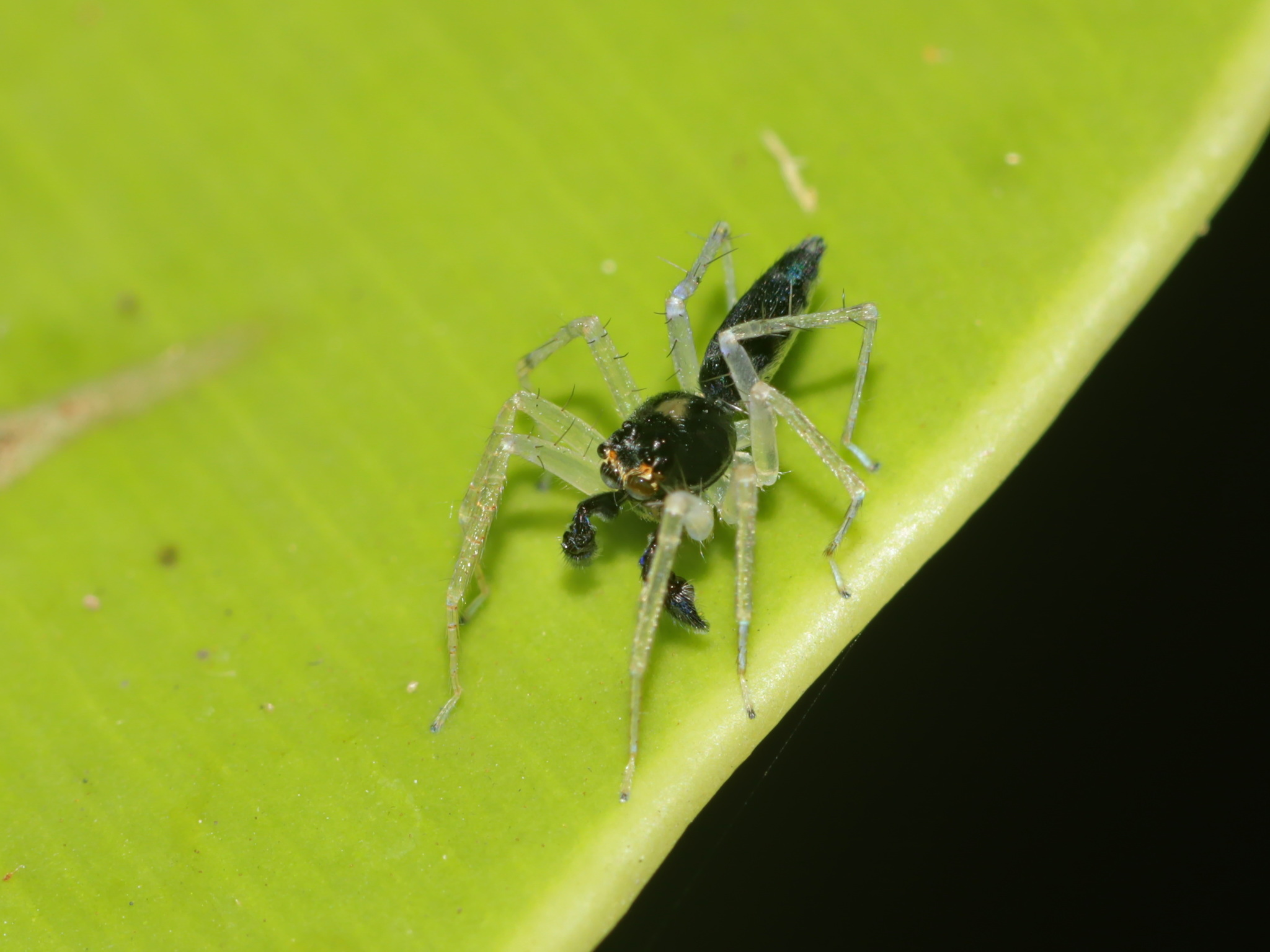
male A. cristata

The abdomen is long and almost cylindrical, with the front truncated and the rear briefly pointed, with amber hairs near the spinnerets and on the front edge of the abdomen. Legs are long and slender, usually pale yellow or green, with blackish lateral streaks or spots and numerous long, moderately robust spines.

Some species have a black pattern on both the carapace and abdomen.

== Life style ==
Spiders in this genus are often found on large green leaves in forests and gardens.

Females, tending their eggs or young, are often found on the underside of green leaves under a sheet of silk so thin that an observer can see inside the cell without difficulty.

== Species ==
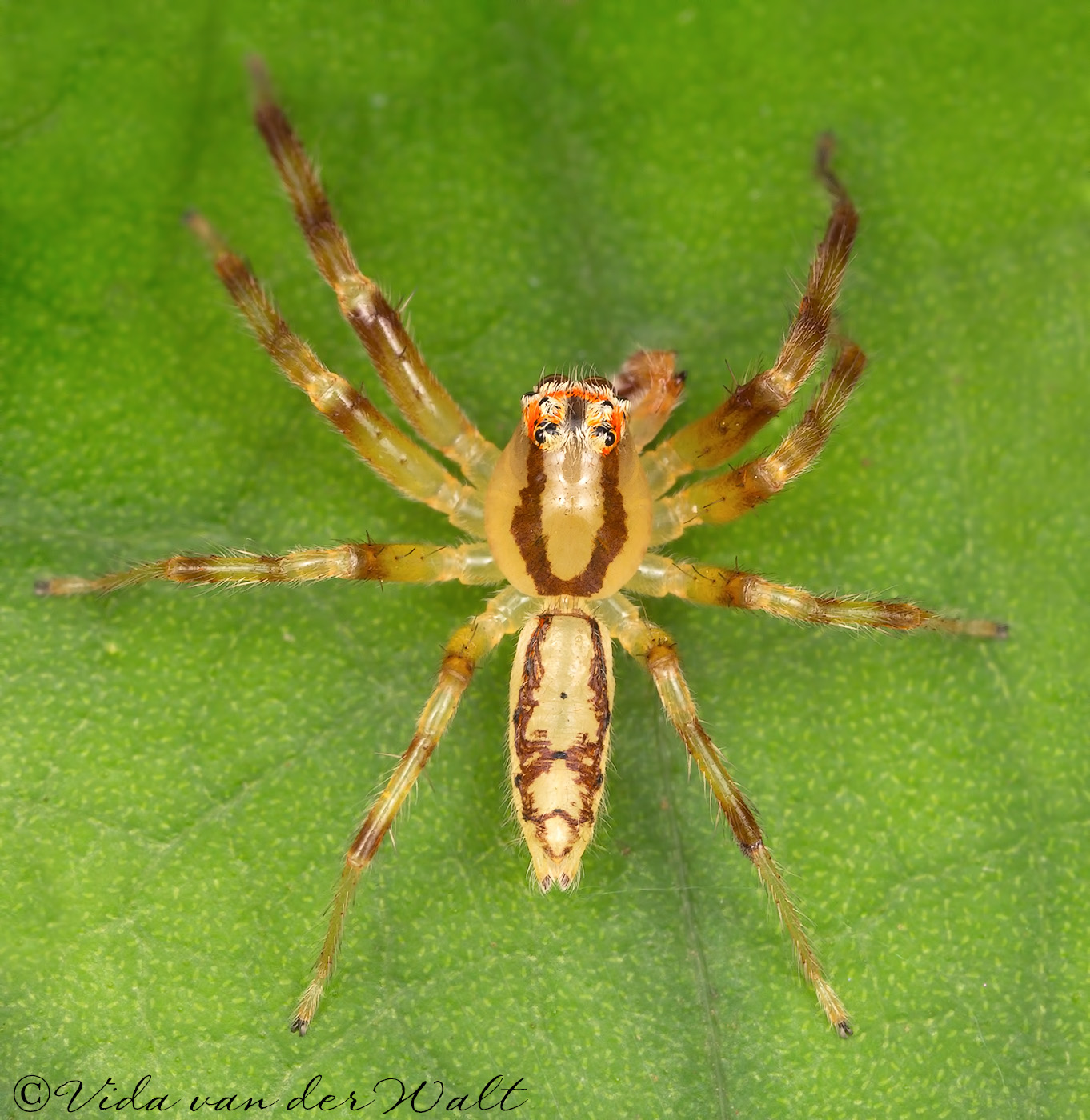
male A. amatola

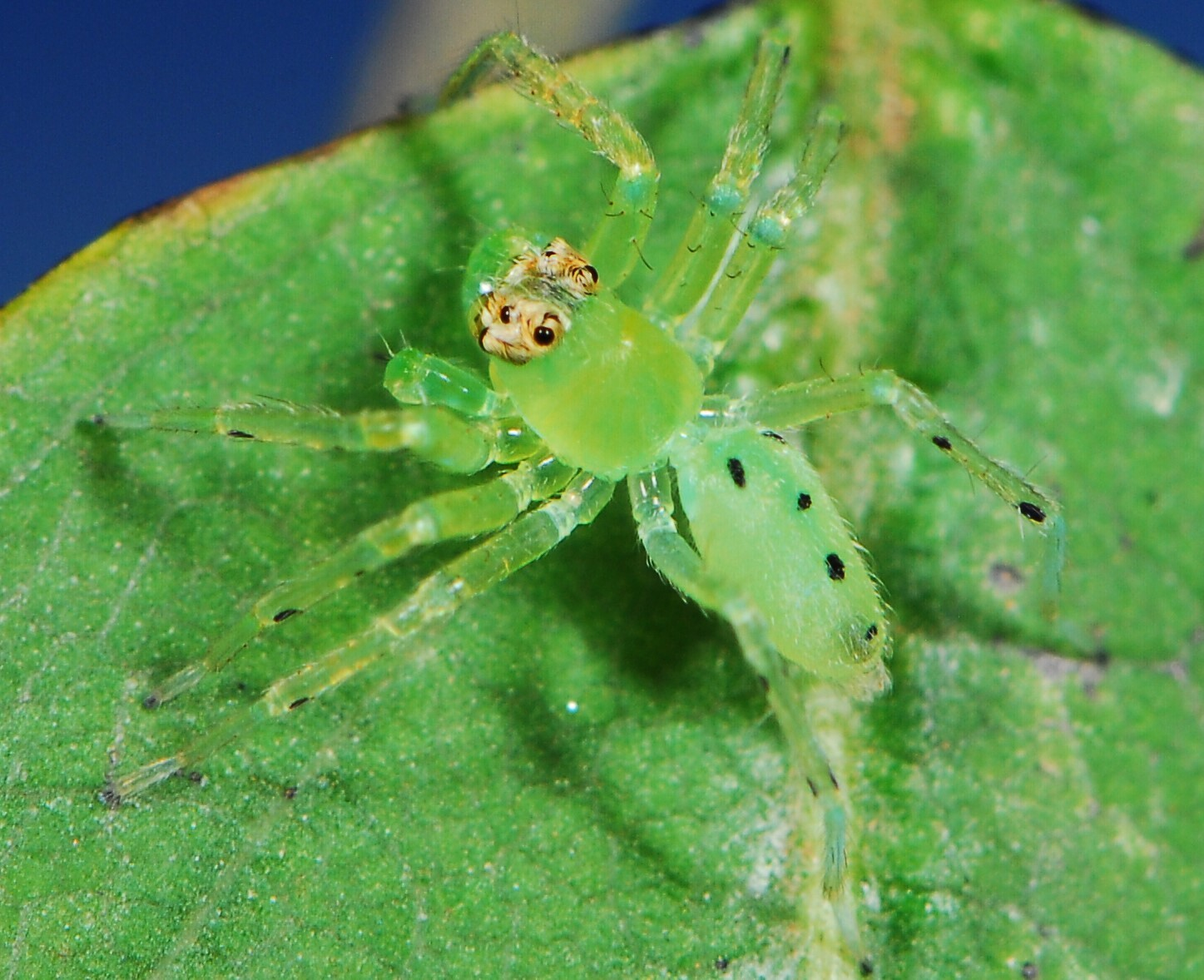
female A. clara

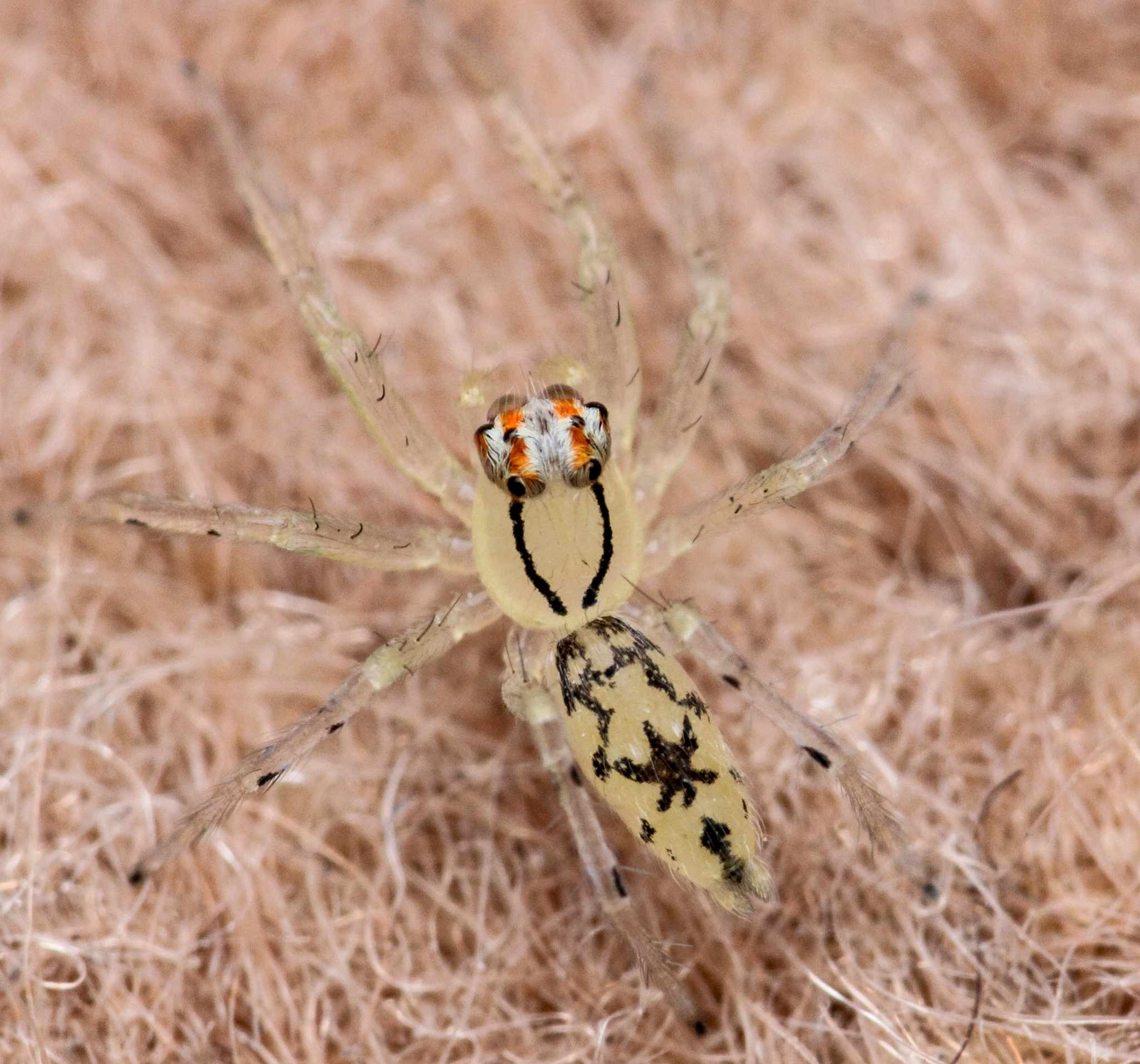
female A. stella

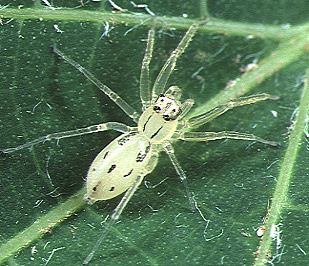
female A. tanikawai

As of October 2025, this genus included 26 species:

- Asemonea amatola Wesołowska & Haddad, 2013 – South Africa
- Asemonea bimaculata Dierkens, 2014 – Comoros, Mayotte
- Asemonea clara Wesołowska & Haddad, 2013 – Mozambique, South Africa
- Asemonea crinita Wanless, 1980 – Ivory Coast
- Asemonea cristata Thorell, 1895 – India, Myanmar
- Asemonea cuprea Wesołowska, 2009 – Zambia
- Asemonea fimbriata Wanless, 1980 – Angola
- Asemonea flava Wesołowska, 2001 – Kenya
- Asemonea liberiensis Wanless, 1980 – Liberia
- Asemonea maculata Wanless, 1980 – Ivory Coast
- Asemonea minuta Wanless, 1980 – Angola
- Asemonea mirpurensis Jahan & Biswas, 2021 – Bangladesh
- Asemonea murphyae Wanless, 1980 – Kenya, South Africa
- Asemonea ornatissima G. W. Peckham, E. G. Peckham & Wheeler, 1889 – Madagascar
- Asemonea pallida Wesołowska, 2001 – Kenya
- Asemonea pinangensis Wanless, 1980 – Malaysia
- Asemonea pulchra Berland & Millot, 1941 – West, Central Africa
- Asemonea pusilla Wesołowska & Russell-Smith, 2022 – Ivory Coast
- Asemonea serrata Wesołowska, 2001 – Kenya
- Asemonea sichuanensis Song & Chai, 1992 – China
- Asemonea stella Wanless, 1980 – Kenya, Tanzania, South Africa. Introduced to Australia (Queensland)
- Asemonea tanikawai Ikeda, 1996 – Japan (Okinawa)
- Asemonea tenuipes (O. Pickard-Cambridge, 1869) – India, Sri Lanka, Nepal, Myanmar, Thailand, Vietnam, Singapore (type species)
- Asemonea trispila Tang, Yin & Peng, 2006 – China
- Asemonea virgea Wesołowska & Szűts, 2003 – Guinea, DR Congo
- Asemonea wagneri Wiśniewski & Wesołowska, 2024 – Uganda
