= Pandisus =

Scientific classification
- Kingdom: Animalia
- Phylum: Arthropoda
- Subphylum: Chelicerata
- Class: Arachnida
- Order: Araneae
- Infraorder: Araneomorphae
- Family: Salticidae
- Subfamily: Asemoneinae
- Genus: Pandisus; Simon, 1900

Type species
- P. scalaris Simon, 1900

Species
- 6, see text

Genus of spiders

Pandisus is a genus of jumping spiders that was first described by Eugène Louis Simon in 1900.

== Species ==
As of August 2019 it contains six species, endemic to Madagascar, except for one, which is found only in India:

- Pandisus decorus Wanless, 1980 – Madagascar
- Pandisus indicus Prószyński, 1992 – India
- Pandisus modestus (Peckham, Peckham & Wheeler, 1889) – Madagascar
- Pandisus parvulus Wanless, 1980 – Madagascar
- Pandisus sarae Wanless, 1980 – Madagascar
- Pandisus scalaris Simon, 1900 (type) – Madagascar
