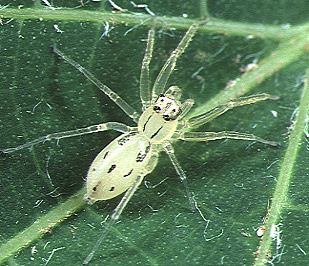
- Female Asemonea tanikawai
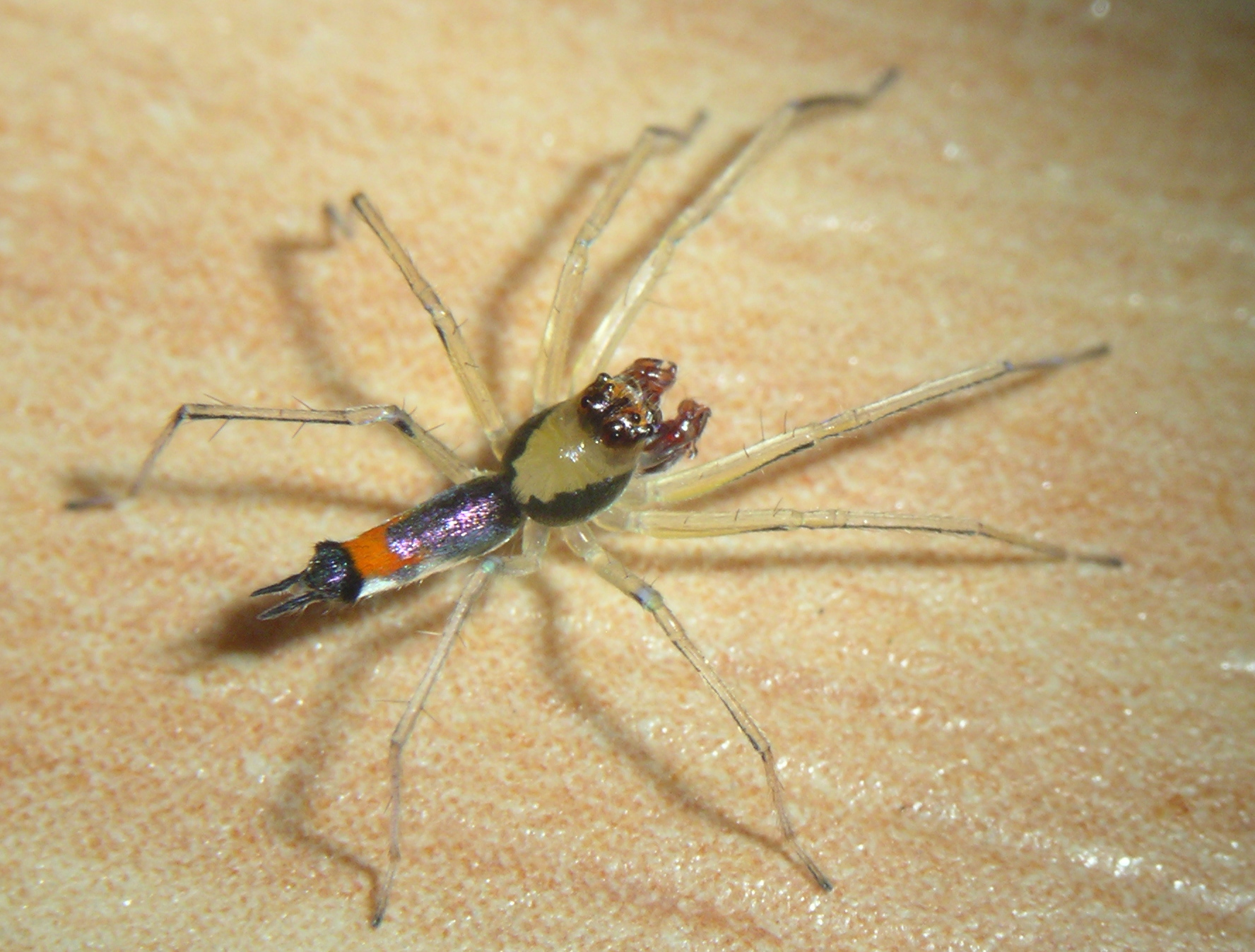
- Male Asemonea tenuipes

Scientific classification
- Kingdom: Animalia
- Phylum: Arthropoda
- Subphylum: Chelicerata
- Class: Arachnida
- Order: Araneae
- Infraorder: Araneomorphae
- Family: Salticidae
- Subfamily: Asemoneinae; Maddison, 2015

Genera
- See text.

= Asemoneinae =

Subfamily of spiders

Asemoneinae is a subfamily of jumping spiders (family Salticidae). It was created in 2015 by Wayne Maddison. Most species are found in Africa or Asia. The subfamily initially had five genera, but Hindumanes was later transferred to the subfamily Lyssomaninae.

== Description ==
Members of the subfamily Asemoneinae are translucent and long-legged relative to most other salticids. They resemble members of the subfamilies Onomastinae and Lyssomaninae sensu Madison, 2015. The posterior median eyes are unusually central for salticids, being distinctly closer to the midline than is the inner edge of the anterior lateral eyes.

== Taxonomy ==
In 2015, Wayne Maddison divided the subfamily Lyssomaninae, as circumscribed in 1980 by Wanless, into three subfamilies, Onomastinae, Asemoneinae and Lyssomaninae s.s. Maddison included five genera. Molecular data united the three sampled genera, Asemonea, Goleba and Pandisus. Two genera, Hindumanes and Macopaeus, were included based on previous classifications. In 2017, Hindumanes, whose type species was originally placed in Lyssomanes, was moved to Lyssomaninae s.s., on the basis of the similarity of the male palpal bulb.

=== Genera ===
As of August 2020, four genera were placed in the subfamily:

- Asemonea O. P.-Cambridge, 1869
- Goleba Wanless, 1980
- Macopaeus Simon, 1900
- Pandisus Simon, 1900
