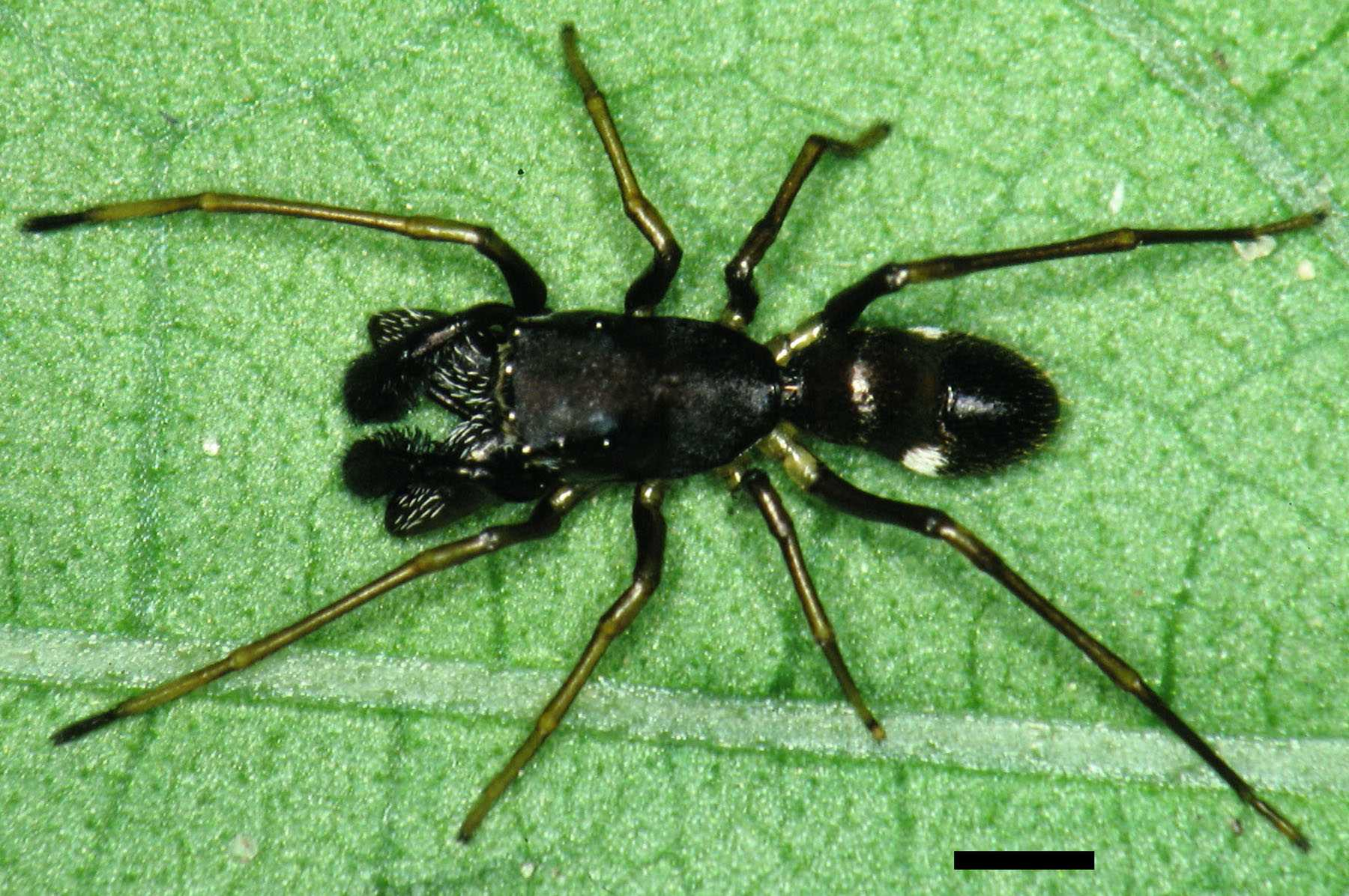
- Female Synemosyna petrunkevitchi

Scientific classification
- Kingdom: Animalia
- Phylum: Arthropoda
- Subphylum: Chelicerata
- Class: Arachnida
- Order: Araneae
- Infraorder: Araneomorphae
- Family: Salticidae
- Clade: Amycoida
- Tribe: Simonellini; Peckham, Peckham & Wheeler, 1889

Type genus
- Simonella Peckham & Peckham, 1885

= Simonellini =

Subfamily of arachnids

Simonellini is a tribe of spiders belonging to the Amycoida clade of the subfamily Salticinae of the family Salticidae. The group has been treated at a variety of formal and informal ranks, with different circumscriptions, including as the subfamilies Synemosyninae and Simonellinae. Its species mimic ants and beetles.

== Description ==
The tribe contains three genera of ant mimics, including the genus Synemosyna, whose species mimic the ant Pseudomyrmex. It also contains the genus Cylistella, whose species mimic beetles. The monophyly of the tribe has been demonstrated in molecular phylogenetic studies, but morphological synapomorphies have not been identified.

== Taxonomy ==
The group was first named by Peckham, Peckham & Wheeler in 1889. It was one of three groups they placed within the subfamily now called Lyssomaninae and then only included the genus Simonella, now recognized as a junior synonym of Synemosyna. At various times it was elevated to a subfamily, either as Synemosyninae or Simonellinae. In Maddison's 2015 classification of the Salticidae, it is treated as tribe.

=== Genera ===
The tribe includes four genera:

- Cylistella Simon, 1901
- Erica Peckham & Peckham, 1892
- Fluda Peckham & Peckham, 1892
- Synemosyna Hentz, 1846
