= Flurica =

Scientific classification
- Kingdom: Animalia
- Phylum: Arthropoda
- Subphylum: Chelicerata
- Class: Arachnida
- Order: Araneae
- Infraorder: Araneomorphae
- Family: Salticidae
- Genus: Flurica; Perger & Rubio, 2022

Type species
- F. sikimira Perger & Rubio, 2022

Species
- 2, see text

Genus of spiders

Flurica is a genus of ant-mimicking spiders in the family Salticidae (jumping spiders).

== Distribution ==
Flurica is endemic to Bolivia.

== Etymology ==
The genus name is a combination of the closely related genera Fluda and Erica.

== Species ==
As of January 2026, this genus includes two species:

- Flurica amazonica Perger, Metzner, Höfer & Rubio, 2023 – Bolivia
- Flurica sikimira Perger & Rubio, 2022 – Bolivia
