= Parafluda =

Scientific classification
- Kingdom: Animalia
- Phylum: Arthropoda
- Subphylum: Chelicerata
- Class: Arachnida
- Order: Araneae
- Infraorder: Araneomorphae
- Family: Salticidae
- Genus: Parafluda; Chickering, 1946
- Species: P. banksi

Binomial name
- Parafluda banksi Chickering, 1946

Genus of spiders

Parafluda is a monotypic genus of jumping spiders containing the single species, Parafluda banksi. It was first described by Arthur Merton Chickering in 1946, and is only found in Argentina and Panama. The name is a combination of the Ancient Greek "para" (παρά), meaning "alongside", and the salticid genus Fluda. The species is named in honor of Nathan Banks.

== See also ==
- Fluda
- Pseudofluda
