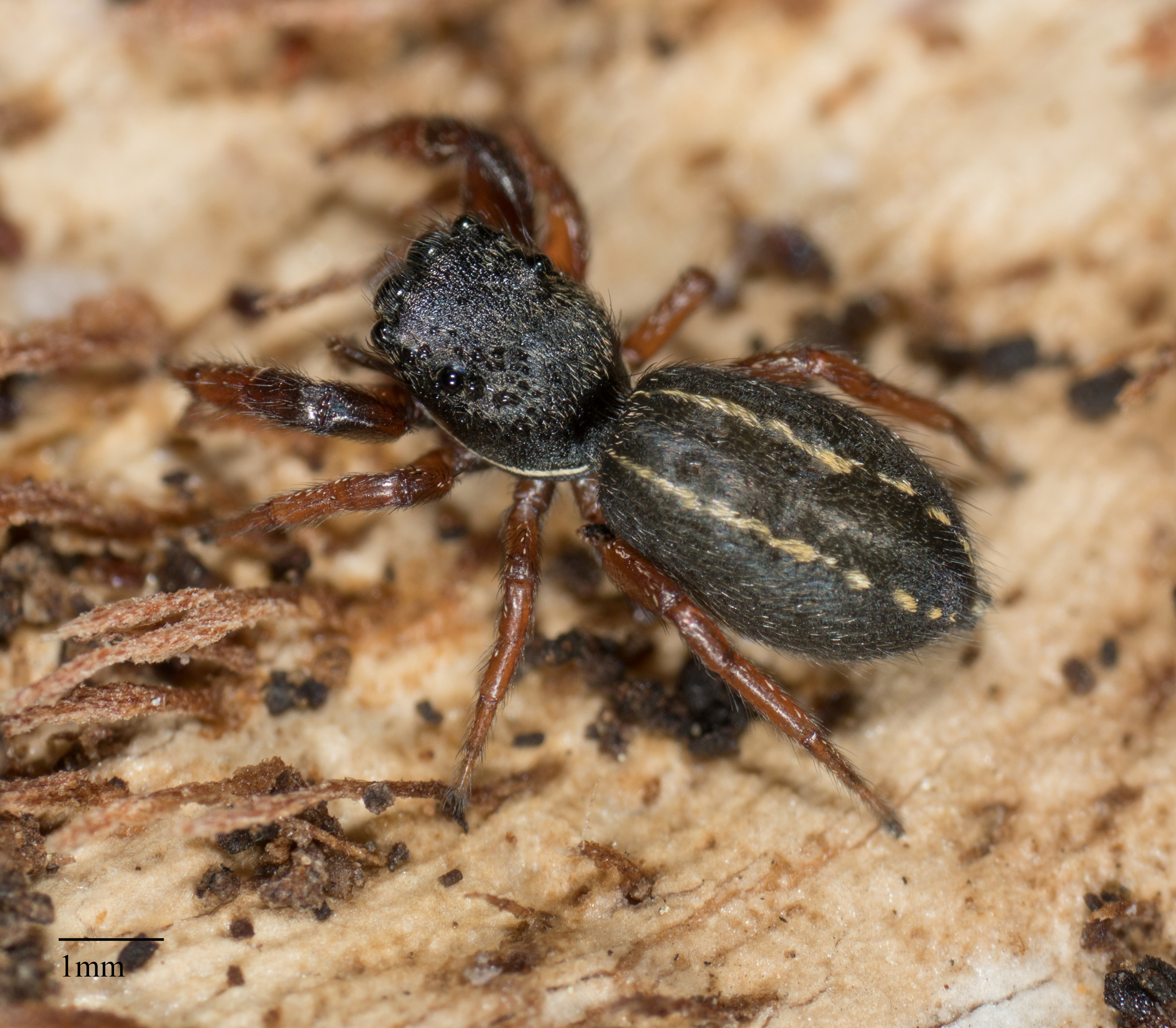
- Metacyrba taeniola similis

Scientific classification
- Kingdom: Animalia
- Phylum: Arthropoda
- Subphylum: Chelicerata
- Class: Arachnida
- Order: Araneae
- Infraorder: Araneomorphae
- Family: Salticidae
- Genus: Metacyrba
- Species: M. taeniola

Binomial name
- Metacyrba taeniola (Hentz, 1846)

Synonyms
- Attus taeniola Hentz, 1846; Cyrba taeniola (Hentz, 1846); Metacyrba similis Banks, 1904

= Metacyrba taeniola =

Species of spider

Metacyrba taeniola, or the ribbon jumping spider, is a species of spider in the family Salticidae, the jumping spiders. Males grow to a length of 4.4–6.0 millimeters (0.17–0.24 in), while females reach 5.0–7.2 mm (0.20–0.28 in). M. taeniola differs from related species such as Metacyrba floridana and M. punctata by its greater overall size, and by the relative broadness of its carapace, which is around 70% of its length.

== Subspecies ==
- Metacyrba taeniola taeniola (Hentz, 1846) – eastern USA to midwestern USA, northwestern Mexico
- Metacyrba taeniola similis Banks, 1904 – western USA, northeastern Mexico
