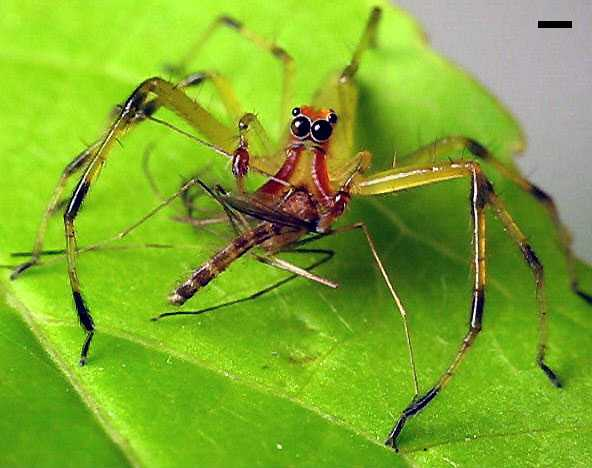
- male Lyssomanes viridis eating a nematoceran (scale = 1 mm)

Scientific classification
- Kingdom: Animalia
- Phylum: Arthropoda
- Subphylum: Chelicerata
- Class: Arachnida
- Order: Araneae
- Infraorder: Araneomorphae
- Family: Salticidae
- Subfamily: Lyssomaninae
- Genus: Lyssomanes; Hentz, 1845

Type species
- Attus viridis Walckenaer, 1837

Species
- See text.

Diversity
- 93 species

= Lyssomanes =

Lyssomanes Temporal range: Neogene–present

Genus of spiders

Lyssomanes is a spider genus of the family Salticidae (jumping spiders), ranging from South and Central America, up to the southern United States.

There have been described 93 extant and two fossil species from the Neotropical Region. The genera Lyssomanes, Chinoscopus, Hindumanes, and Sumakuru make up the Lyssomaninae, which is one of the six deeply-diverging subfamilies of jumping spiders.

They are long-legged, with translucent bodies frequently green or yellow. They resemble lynx spiders, except that they have large anterior median eyes.

== Habitat ==
Lyssomanes are typically found in foliage in mesic habitats.

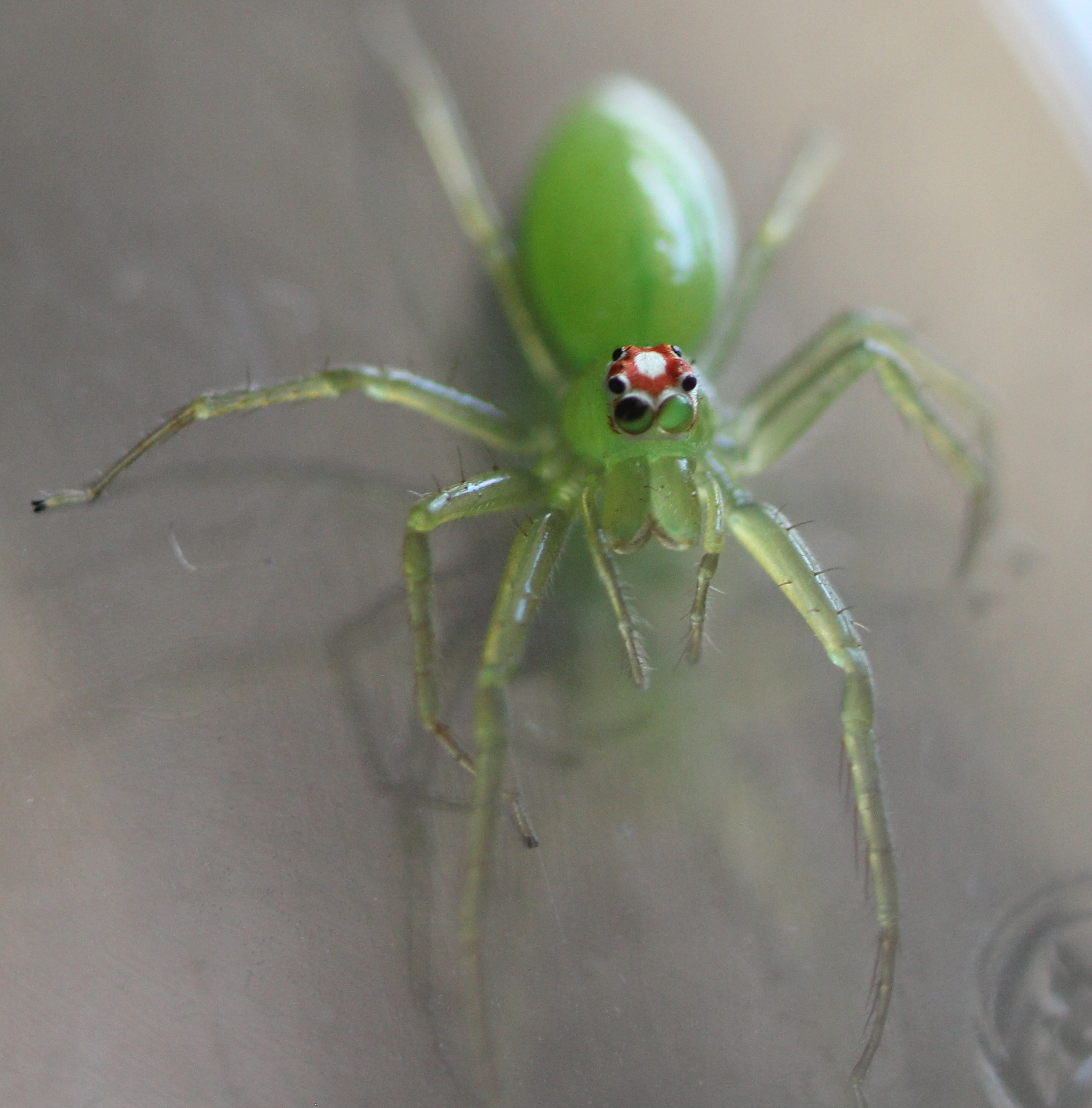
female L. viridis from Florida

== Species ==
As of August 2025, the World Spider Catalog accepted the following species:

- Lyssomanes adisi Logunov, 2002 – Brazil
- Lyssomanes amazonicus Peckham, Peckham & Wheeler, 1889 – Colombia, Ecuador, Bolivia, Brazil, Guyana
- Lyssomanes anchicaya Galiano, 1984 – Costa Rica, Panama, Colombia
- Lyssomanes antillanus Peckham, Peckham & Wheeler, 1889 – Cuba, Jamaica, Hispaniola, Saba
- Lyssomanes austerus Peckham, Peckham & Wheeler, 1889 – Brazil, Argentina
- Lyssomanes aya Logunov, 2015 – French Guiana
- Lyssomanes belgranoi Galiano, 1984 – Argentina
- Lyssomanes benderi Logunov, 2002 – Brazil, Ecuador, French Guiana
- Lyssomanes bitaeniatus Peckham, Peckham & Wheeler, 1889 – El Salvador to Venezuela
- Lyssomanes blandus Peckham, Peckham & Wheeler, 1889 – Guatemala
- Lyssomanes boraceia Galiano, 1984 – Brazil
- Lyssomanes bryantae Chickering, 1946 – Panama
- Lyssomanes burrera Jiménez & Tejas, 1993 – Mexico
- Lyssomanes camacanensis Galiano, 1980 – Brazil
- Lyssomanes ceplaci Galiano, 1980 – Brazil
- Lyssomanes consimilis Banks, 1929 – Panama
- Lyssomanes convexus Banks, 1909 – Costa Rica
- Lyssomanes courtiali Logunov, 2015 – French Guiana
- Lyssomanes deinognathus F. O. Pickard-Cambridge, 1900 – Mexico to Honduras
- Lyssomanes devotoi Mello-Leitão, 1917 – Brazil
- Lyssomanes dissimilis Banks, 1929 – Panama
- Lyssomanes diversus Galiano, 1980 – Mexico
- Lyssomanes eatoni Chickering, 1946 – Panama
- Lyssomanes ecuadoricus Logunov & Marusik, 2003 – Ecuador
- Lyssomanes elegans F. O. Pickard-Cambridge, 1900 – Mexico to Brazil
- Lyssomanes elongatus Galiano, 1980 – Brazil
- Lyssomanes euriensis Logunov, 2000 – Peru
- Lyssomanes flagellum Kraus, 1955 – El Salvador
- Lyssomanes florenciae Bedoya-Róqueme, 2022 – Brazil
- Lyssomanes fossor Galiano, 1996 – Brazil
- Lyssomanes franckei Galvis, 2020 – Mexico
- Lyssomanes hieroglyphicus Mello-Leitão, 1944 – Argentina
- Lyssomanes ipanemae Galiano, 1980 – Brazil, French Guiana
- Lyssomanes janauari Logunov & Marusik, 2003 – Brazil
- Lyssomanes jemineus Peckham, Peckham & Wheeler, 1889 – Mexico to Guyana
- Lyssomanes jucari Galiano, 1984 – Brazil
- Lyssomanes lampeli Logunov, 2014 – Guyana
- Lyssomanes lancetillae Galiano, 1980 – Honduras, Nicaragua
- Lyssomanes lehtineni Logunov, 2000 – Peru
- Lyssomanes leucomelas Mello-Leitão, 1917 – Mexico, Brazil, Argentina
- Lyssomanes limpidus Galiano, 1980 – Colombia
- Lyssomanes longipes (Taczanowski, 1871) – Brazil, French Guiana, Guyana
- Lyssomanes maddisoni Logunov, 2014 – Mexico
- Lyssomanes malinche Galiano, 1980 – Mexico
- Lyssomanes manausensis Logunov, 2014 – Brazil
- Lyssomanes mandibulatus F. O. Pickard-Cambridge, 1900 – Mexico to Panama
- Lyssomanes matoensis Logunov, 2014 – Brazil
- Lyssomanes mexicanus Logunov, 2014 – Mexico
- Lyssomanes michae Brignoli, 1984 – West Indies
- Lyssomanes miniaceus Peckham, Peckham & Wheeler, 1889 – Brazil, Argentina
- Lyssomanes minor Schenkel, 1953 – Venezuela
- Lyssomanes nigrofimbriatus Mello-Leitão, 1941 – Brazil, Argentina
- Lyssomanes nigropictus Peckham, Peckham & Wheeler, 1889 – Brazil, Guyana, Suriname, French Guiana, Ecuador
- Lyssomanes onkonensis Logunov & Marusik, 2003 – Ecuador
- Lyssomanes parallelus Peckham, Peckham & Wheeler, 1889 – Brazil
- Lyssomanes paravelox Logunov, 2002 – Brazil
- Lyssomanes parki Chickering, 1946 – Panama
- Lyssomanes patens Peckham & Peckham, 1896 – Honduras to Panama
- Lyssomanes pauper Mello-Leitão, 1945 – Brazil, Argentina
- Lyssomanes penicillatus Mello-Leitão, 1927 – Brazil, Argentina
- Lyssomanes perafani Galvis, 2017 – Colombia
- Lyssomanes peruensis Logunov, 2000 – Peru
- Lyssomanes pescadero Jiménez & Tejas, 1993 – Mexico
- Lyssomanes pichilingue Galiano, 1984 – Ecuador
- Lyssomanes placidus Peckham, Peckham & Wheeler, 1889 – Mexico
- Lyssomanes portoricensis Petrunkevitch, 1930 – Puerto Rico to Martinique
- †Lyssomanes pristinus Wunderlich, 1986 – Dominican Republic
- Lyssomanes protarsalis F. O. Pickard-Cambridge, 1900 – Guatemala
- †Lyssomanes pulcher Wunderlich, 1988 – Dominican Republic
- Lyssomanes quadrinotatus Simon, 1900 – Venezuela
- Lyssomanes reductus Peckham & Peckham, 1896 – Mexico to Panama
- Lyssomanes remotus Peckham & Peckham, 1896 – Panama to Brazil
- Lyssomanes robustus (Taczanowski, 1878) – Peru, Brazil
- Lyssomanes romani Logunov, 2000 – Brazil, Ecuador
- Lyssomanes rudis Logunov, 2015 – French Guiana
- Lyssomanes santarem Galiano, 1984 – Brazil
- Lyssomanes silvestris Logunov, 2014 – Brazil
- Lyssomanes similis Logunov, 2014 – Brazil
- Lyssomanes spiralis F. O. Pickard-Cambridge, 1900 – Mexico to Nicaragua
- Lyssomanes sylvicola Galiano, 1980 – Brazil
- Lyssomanes taczanowskii Galiano, 1980 – Trinidad to Peru, Ecuador
- Lyssomanes tapirapensis Galiano, 1996 – Venezuela, French Guiana, Brazil
- Lyssomanes tapuiramae Galiano, 1980 – Brazil
- Lyssomanes tarmae Galiano, 1980 – Peru
- Lyssomanes temperatus Galiano, 1980 – Mexico
- Lyssomanes tenuis Peckham, Peckham & Wheeler, 1889 – Colombia, Ecuador, Brazil, Guyana
- Lyssomanes trinidadus Logunov & Marusik, 2003 – Trinidad
- Lyssomanes tristis Peckham, Peckham & Wheeler, 1889 – Brazil, Argentina
- Lyssomanes unicolor (Taczanowski, 1871) – Mexico to Peru, Ecuador, Brazil
- Lyssomanes velox Peckham, Peckham & Wheeler, 1889 – Brazil, Ecuador
- Lyssomanes vinocurae Galiano, 1996 – Brazil
- Lyssomanes viridis (Walckenaer, 1837) (type species) – USA
- Lyssomanes waorani Logunov & Marusik, 2003 – Ecuador
- Lyssomanes wiwa Galvis, 2017 – Colombia
- Lyssomanes yacui Galiano, 1984 – Argentina, Paraguay, Brazil
