= Banksetosa =

Scientific classification
- Kingdom: Animalia
- Phylum: Arthropoda
- Subphylum: Chelicerata
- Class: Arachnida
- Order: Araneae
- Infraorder: Araneomorphae
- Family: Salticidae
- Subfamily: Salticinae
- Genus: Banksetosa; Chickering, 1946

Type species
- B. dubia Chickering, 1946

Species
- B. dubia Chickering, 1946 – Panama; B. notata Chickering, 1946 – Panama

Genus of spiders

Banksetosa is a genus of Panamanian jumping spiders that was first described by Arthur Merton Chickering in 1946. As of June 2019 it contains only two species, found only in Panama: B. dubia and B. notata. It is named in honor of Nathan Banks.
