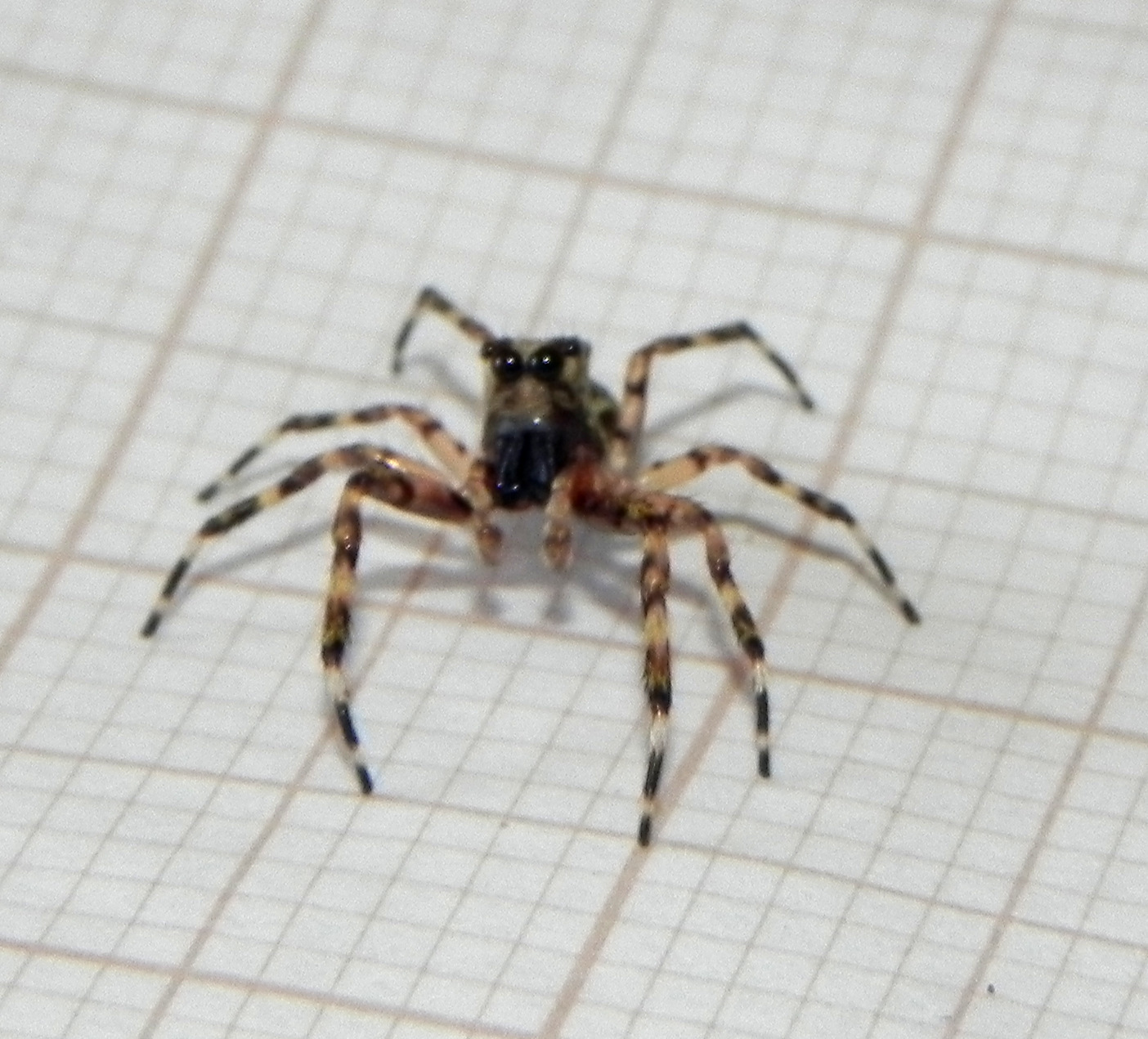
- Titanattus euryphaessa, Brazil

Scientific classification
- Kingdom: Animalia
- Phylum: Arthropoda
- Subphylum: Chelicerata
- Class: Arachnida
- Order: Araneae
- Infraorder: Araneomorphae
- Family: Salticidae
- Subfamily: Salticinae
- Genus: Titanattus; Peckham & Peckham, 1885

Type species
- T. saevus Peckham & Peckham, 1885

Species
- See text

Synonyms
- Agelista Simon, 1900

= Titanattus =

Genus of spiders

Titanattus is a genus of jumping spiders that was first described by George and Elizabeth Peckham in 1885. The name is a combination of "Titan" and the common salticid suffix -attus. The genus Agelista was accepted as a synonym of Titanattus in 2017.

== Species ==
As of 2021 it contains eleven species, found in Central America, Venezuela, Ecuador, Argentina, Paraguay, and Brazil:

- Titanattus andinus (Simon, 1900) – Brazil, Paraguay, Argentina
- Titanattus cordia Edwards & Baert, 2018 – Ecuador (Galapagos Is.)
- Titanattus cretatus Chickering, 1946 – Panama
- Titanattus euryphaessa Bustamante & Ruiz, 2017 – Brazil, Ecuador
- Titanattus notabilis (Mello-Leitão, 1943) – Brazil, Argentina
- Titanattus novarai Caporiacco, 1955 – Venezuela
- Titanattus paganus Chickering, 1946 – Panama
- Titanattus pallidus Mello-Leitão, 1943 – Brazil
- Titanattus parvus (Mello-Leitão, 1945) – Argentina
- Titanattus pegaseus Simon, 1900 – Brazil
- Titanattus saevus Peckham & Peckham, 1885 (type) – Guatemala, Mexico
