= Simprulla =

Scientific classification
- Kingdom: Animalia
- Phylum: Arthropoda
- Subphylum: Chelicerata
- Class: Arachnida
- Order: Araneae
- Infraorder: Araneomorphae
- Family: Salticidae
- Subfamily: Salticinae
- Genus: Simprulla; Simon, 1901

Type species
- S. nigricolor Simon, 1901

Species
- S. argentina Mello-Leitão, 1940 – Argentina; S. nigricolor Simon, 1901 – Panama to Brazil

Synonyms
- Donatinus Chickering, 1946

Genus of spiders

Simprulla is a genus of jumping spiders that was first described by Eugène Louis Simon in 1901. As of August 2019 it contains only two species, found only in Brazil, Argentina, and Panama: S. argentina and S. nigricolor.
