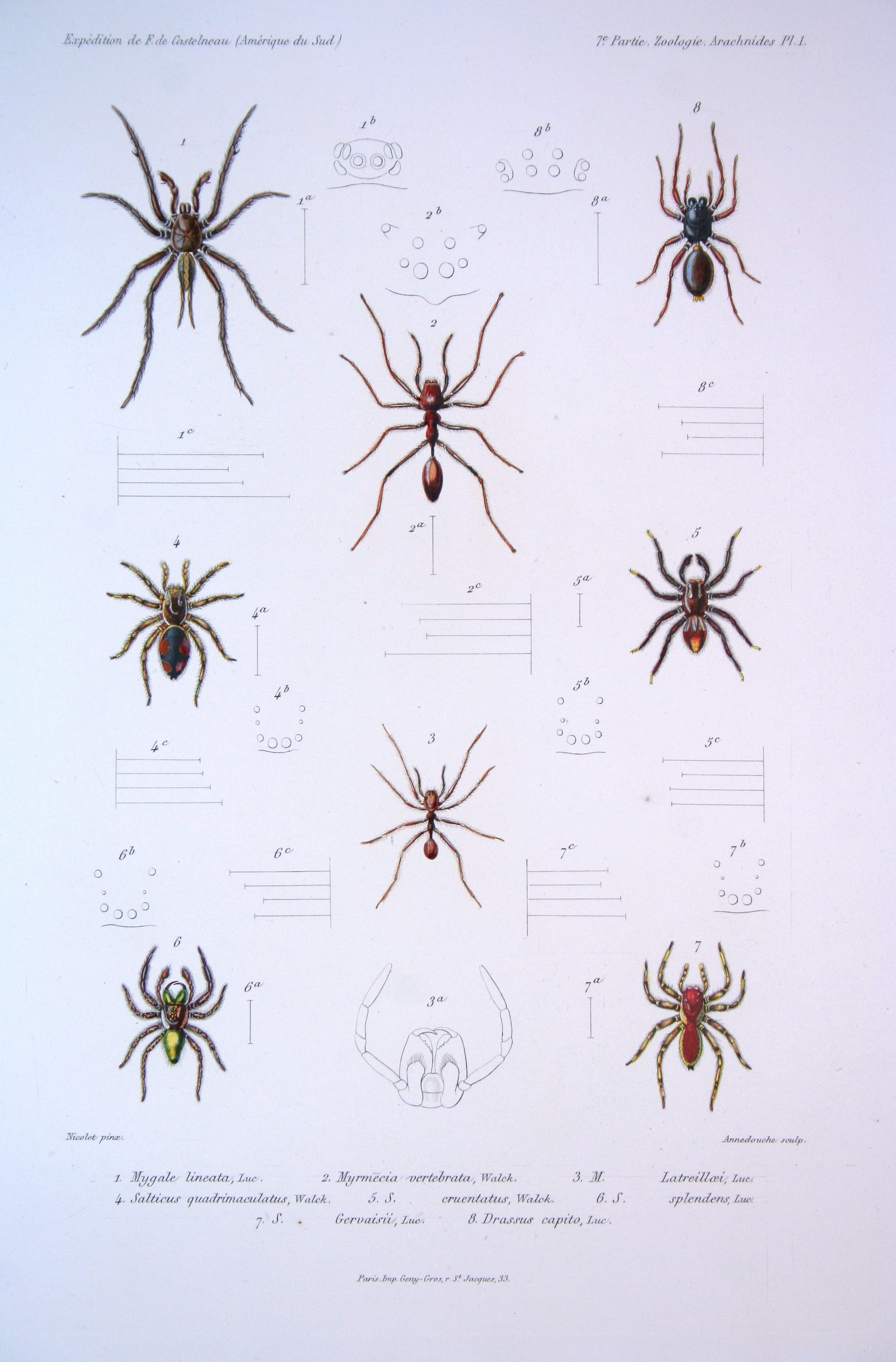

Scientific classification
- Kingdom: Animalia
- Phylum: Arthropoda
- Subphylum: Chelicerata
- Class: Arachnida
- Order: Araneae
- Infraorder: Araneomorphae
- Family: Corinnidae
- Genus: Myrmecium; Latreille, 1824

Type species
- M. rufum Latreille, 1824

Species
- 39, see text

= Myrmecium (spider) =

Genus of spiders

Myrmecium is a genus of ant-mimicking corinnid sac spiders first described by Pierre André Latreille in 1824. The unrelated jumping spider species Synemosyna formica has been mistaken for a member of this genus twice, once by Eugène Simon in 1897 (Myrmecium lunatum) and once by Cândido Firmino de Mello-Leitão in 1932 (Myrmecium rubrum).

== Species ==
As of April 2019 it contains thirty-nine species in South America and the Caribbean:

- Myrmecium amphora Candiani & Bonaldo, 2017 – Venezuela
- Myrmecium bifasciatum Taczanowski, 1874 – Bolivia, Trinidad, Guyana, Suriname, French Guiana, Brazil
- Myrmecium bolivari Candiani & Bonaldo, 2017 – Venezuela, Colombia
- Myrmecium bonaerense Holmberg, 1881 – Argentina
- Myrmecium camponotoides Mello-Leitão, 1932 – Brazil
- Myrmecium carajas Candiani & Bonaldo, 2017 – Brazil
- Myrmecium carvalhoi Candiani & Bonaldo, 2017 – Brazil
- Myrmecium catuxy Candiani & Bonaldo, 2017 – Colombia, Brazil
- Myrmecium chikish Candiani & Bonaldo, 2017 – Peru
- Myrmecium cizauskasi Candiani & Bonaldo, 2017 – Brazil
- Myrmecium dacetoniforme Mello-Leitão, 1932 – Brazil
- Myrmecium deladanta Candiani & Bonaldo, 2017 – Ecuador
- Myrmecium diasi Candiani & Bonaldo, 2017 – Brazil
- Myrmecium erici Candiani & Bonaldo, 2017 – Guyana
- Myrmecium ferro Candiani & Bonaldo, 2017 – Brazil
- Myrmecium fuscum Dahl, 1907 – Peru, Bolivia, Brazil
- Myrmecium indicattii Candiani & Bonaldo, 2017 – Brazil
- Myrmecium latreillei (Lucas, 1857) – Brazil
- Myrmecium lomanhungae Candiani & Bonaldo, 2017 – Brazil
- Myrmecium luepa Candiani & Bonaldo, 2017 – Venezuela
- Myrmecium machetero Candiani & Bonaldo, 2017 – Bolivia, Peru
- Myrmecium malleum Candiani & Bonaldo, 2017 – Venezuela, Colombia
- Myrmecium monacanthum Simon, 1897 – Colombia
- Myrmecium nogueirai Candiani & Bonaldo, 2017 – Peru, Brazil
- Myrmecium oliveirai Candiani & Bonaldo, 2017 – Brazil
- Myrmecium oompaloompa Candiani & Bonaldo, 2017 – Brazil, Guyana
- Myrmecium otti Candiani & Bonaldo, 2017 – Peru, Brazil
- Myrmecium pakpaka Candiani & Bonaldo, 2017 – Peru
- Myrmecium raveni Candiani & Bonaldo, 2017 – Brazil
- Myrmecium reticulatum Dahl, 1907 – Peru
- Myrmecium ricettii Candiani & Bonaldo, 2017 – Colombia, Brazil
- Myrmecium rufum Latreille, 1824 (type) – Brazil
- Myrmecium souzai Candiani & Bonaldo, 2017 – Brazil
- Myrmecium tanguro Candiani & Bonaldo, 2017 – Brazil
- Myrmecium tikuna Candiani & Bonaldo, 2017 – Brazil
- Myrmecium trifasciatum Caporiacco, 1947 – Guyana, Brazil
- Myrmecium urucu Candiani & Bonaldo, 2017 – Brazil
- Myrmecium viehmeyeri Dahl, 1907 – Peru, Bolivia, Brazil
- Myrmecium yamamotoi Candiani & Bonaldo, 2017 – Suriname, Brazil
