= Hindumanes =

Scientific classification
- Kingdom: Animalia
- Phylum: Arthropoda
- Subphylum: Chelicerata
- Class: Arachnida
- Order: Araneae
- Infraorder: Araneomorphae
- Family: Salticidae
- Subfamily: Lyssomaninae
- Genus: Hindumanes; Logunov, 2004

Species
- See text.

Genus of spiders

Hindumanes is a genus of jumping spiders (family Salticidae) found in India. It was first described by Dmitri Logunov in 2004. The name Hindumanes is a portmanteau of "Hinduism", the dominant religion of India, and Lyssomanes, the genus H. karnatakaensis was initially assigned to. As of May 2024, two species have been described:

- Hindumanes karnatakaensis (Tikader & Biswas, 1978)
- Hindumanes wayanadensis (Sudhin, Nafin & Sudhikumar, 2017)

== Taxonomy ==
The exact taxonomy of this genus may not be fully settled as multiple changes have been made in recent years and a genetic analysis has yet to be published.

The first discovered species of this genus, H. karnatakaensis, was initially placed in the Lyssomanes genus. Due to several distinguishing characteristics of this species, it was later removed from Lyssomanes, and the genus Hindumanes was created to accommodate it.

The genus Hindumanes was temporarily moved to the subfamily Asemoneinae in 2015 alongside Pandisus as the two were thought to be close relatives. This change was reversed in 2017, when a male H. karnatakaensis was first described in 2017, and Hindumanes was returned to Lyssomaninae due to similarities of the male palpal bulb.

== Identification ==
Females are green and somewhat translucent. Males of H. wayanadensis have not been described, but H. karnatakaensis males are orangish-yellow, with some lateral red-brown markings, a pair of longitudinal black stripes down the sides of their abdomen, and a pair of extended front legs.

Distinct from other members of the Lyssomaninae subfamily, Hindumanes species are characterized by a high and oval carapace, relatively narrower eye field width, and front facing main eyes with anterior lateral eyes (ALE) positioned directly behind them.

Species within the genus Hindumanes bear considerable similarity to species within the genus Lyssomanes found in the New World, whereas Hindumanes species are found in India. These two genera can also be distinguished by the distinct eye pattern of narrower eye fields and ALE directly behind their front facing main eyes present in Hindumanes. Additionally, species within the genus Lyssomanes have lateral and dorsal spines on their patellae, which the two Hindumanes species lack.

Differences in reproductive organs of the female are also notable, as Hindumanes lack glandular ducts of the spermathecae, which are present across species in Lyssomanes.

== Brood Care ==
A H. karnatakaensis female has been observed guarding a brood nest on the underside of a Colocasia esculenta leaf. The nest consists for a number of eggs covered in a thin covering of silk securing loosely packed eggs to the underside of a leaf.

Both the nest and the guarding behaviour are reminiscent of Lyssomanes, particularly L. viridis. This similarity could indicate that these genera are closely related.

Because L. viridis has a strong chemical preference for Liquidambar styraciflua as a substrate, it has been suggested that it is immunologically dependent on plants that contain antimicrobial compounds. Given the other shared nesting characteristics, this could potentially be the case for H. karnatakaensis as well, as C. esculenta has also been found to be high in broad spectrum antimicrobial compounds.
