= Pseudofluda =

Scientific classification
- Kingdom: Animalia
- Phylum: Arthropoda
- Subphylum: Chelicerata
- Class: Arachnida
- Order: Araneae
- Infraorder: Araneomorphae
- Family: Salticidae
- Subfamily: Salticinae
- Genus: Pseudofluda; Mello-Leitão, 1928

Type species
- P. pulcherrima Mello-Leitão, 1928

Species
- P. capandegui Nadal & Rubio, 2019 – Argentina; P. pergeri Nadal & Rubio, 2019 – Argentina; P. pulcherrima Mello-Leitão, 1928 – Brazil, Argentina

Genus of spiders

Pseudofluda is a genus of South American jumping spiders that was first described by Cândido Firmino de Mello-Leitão in 1928. As of August 2019 it contains only three species, found only in Brazil and Argentina: P. capandegui, P. pergeri, and P. pulcherrima. The name is a combination of the Ancient Greek "pseudo-" (ψευδής), meaning "false", and the salticid genus name Fluda.

The male of this species is 2.5 millimetres (1/10 in) long. The cephalothorax is chestnut-colored to black, with a chestnut colored spot on the posterior region. A white line goes along the length of the cephalothorax. The back of the abdomen is tawny with violet and green metallic scales. The species was first found in Petropolis, Brazil.

== See also ==
- Fluda
- Parafluda
