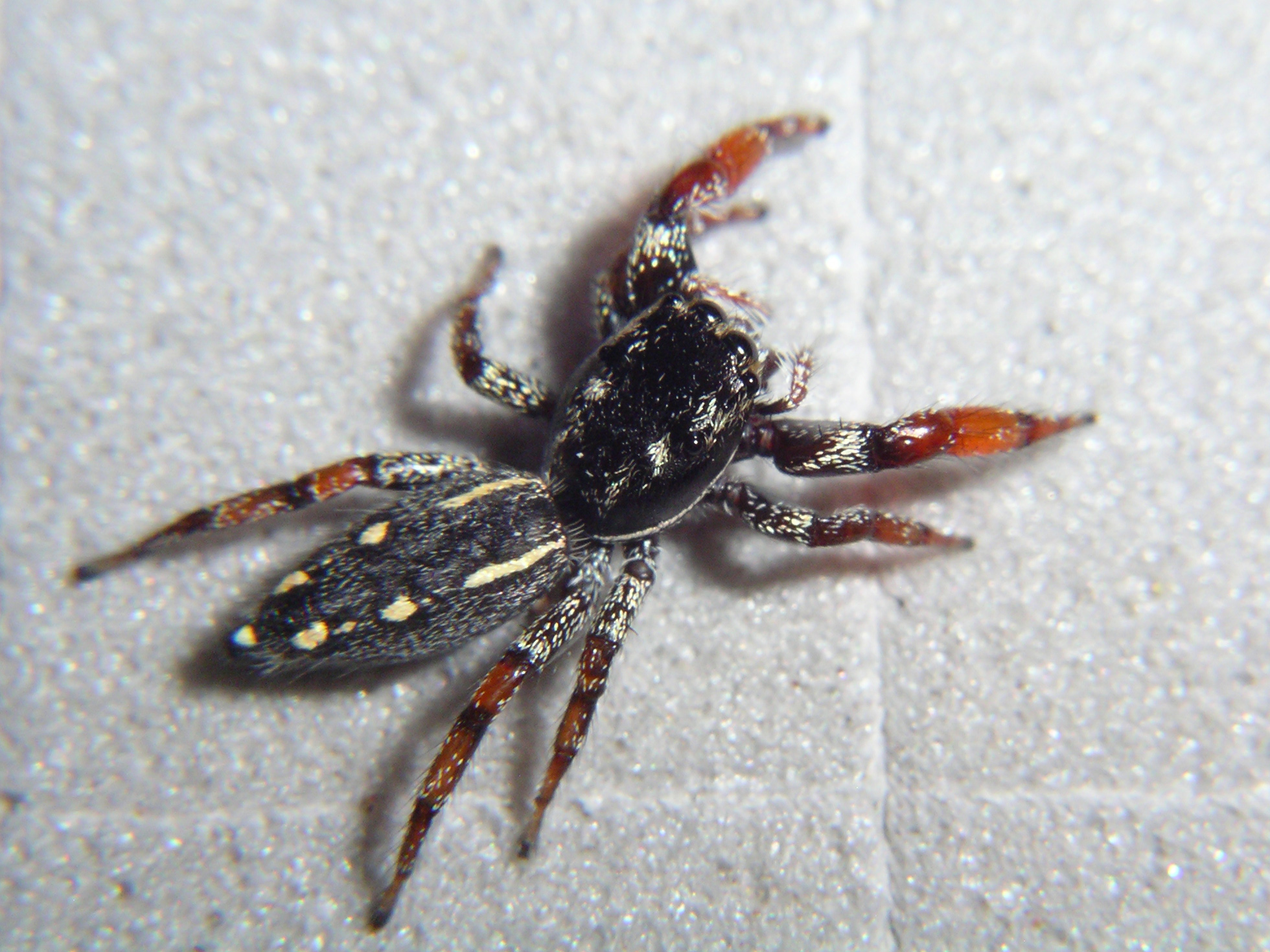
- Female Metacyrba from the Dominican Republic

Scientific classification
- Kingdom: Animalia
- Phylum: Arthropoda
- Subphylum: Chelicerata
- Class: Arachnida
- Order: Araneae
- Infraorder: Araneomorphae
- Family: Salticidae
- Subfamily: Salticinae
- Genus: Metacyrba; F. O. Pickard-Cambridge, 1901

Type species
- M. taeniola (Hentz, 1846)

Species
- 7, see text

Synonyms
- Parkella Chickering, 1946

= Metacyrba =

Genus of spiders

Metacyrba is a genus of jumping spiders that was first described by Frederick Octavius Pickard-Cambridge in 1901. The name is combined from Ancient Greek μετά "after, beside" and the salticid genus Cyrba.

== Species ==
As of June 2019, it contains seven species and one subspecies, found in South America, Mexico, the United States, Cuba, and on the Greater Antilles:

- Metacyrba alberti Cala-Riquelme, 2017 – Cuba
- Metacyrba floridana Gertsch, 1934 – USA
- Metacyrba insularis (Banks, 1902) – Ecuador (Galapagos Is.)
- Metacyrba pictipes Banks, 1903 – Hispaniola
- Metacyrba punctata (Peckham & Peckham, 1894) – USA to Ecuador
- Metacyrba taeniola (Hentz, 1846) (type) – USA, Mexico
  - Metacyrba t. similis Banks, 1904 – USA, Mexico
- Metacyrba venusta (Chickering, 1946) – Mexico to Venezuela
