= Toloella =

Scientific classification
- Kingdom: Animalia
- Phylum: Arthropoda
- Subphylum: Chelicerata
- Class: Arachnida
- Order: Araneae
- Infraorder: Araneomorphae
- Family: Salticidae
- Genus: Toloella; Chickering, 1946
- Species: T. eximia

Binomial name
- Toloella eximia Chickering, 1946

Genus of spiders

Toloella is a monotypic genus of Panamanian jumping spiders containing the single species, Toloella eximia. It was first described by Arthur Merton Chickering in 1946, and is found only in Panama.
