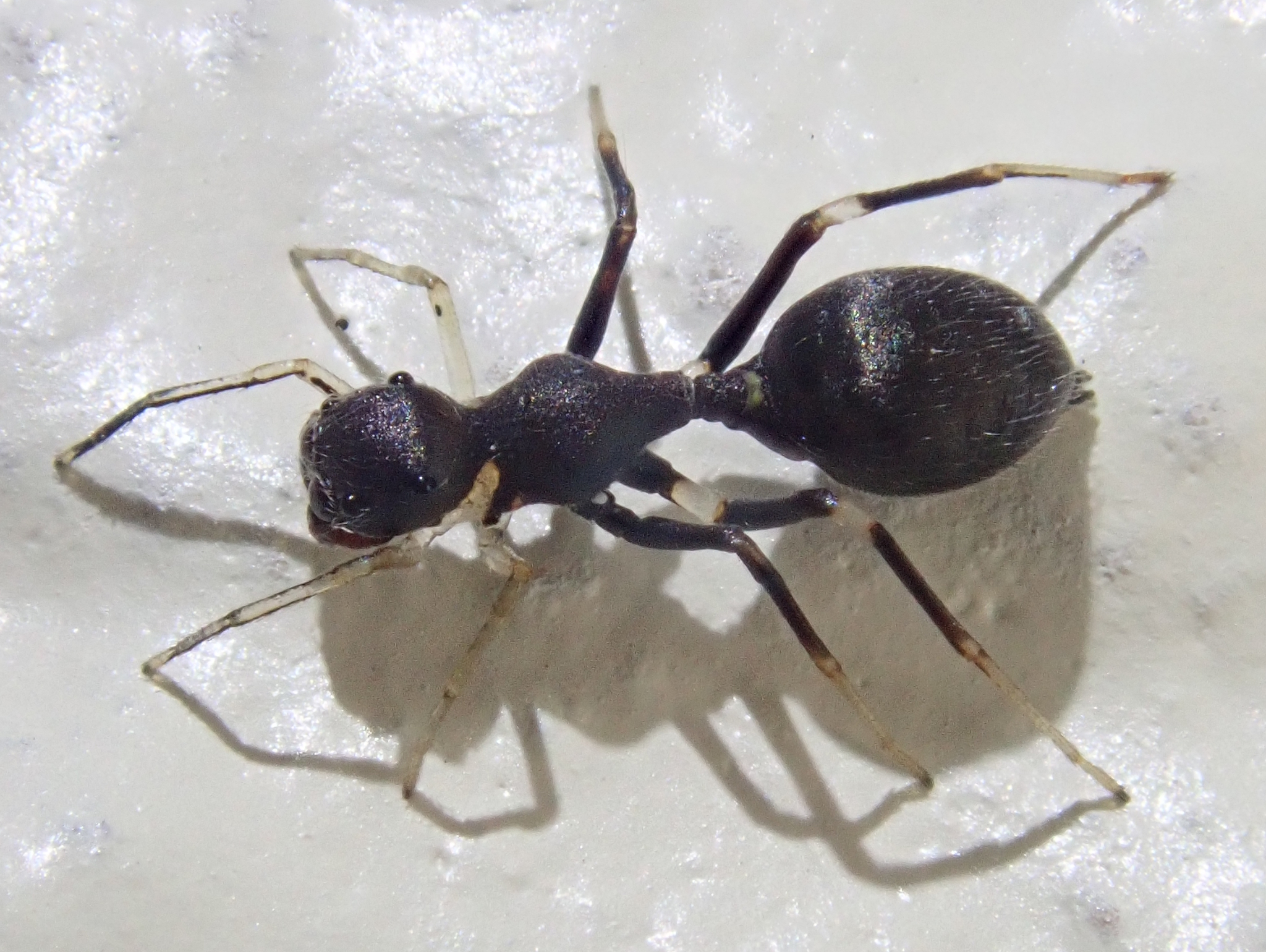
- S. lauretta in Brazil

Scientific classification
- Kingdom: Animalia
- Phylum: Arthropoda
- Subphylum: Chelicerata
- Class: Arachnida
- Order: Araneae
- Infraorder: Araneomorphae
- Family: Salticidae
- Tribe: Simonellini
- Genus: Sympolymnia; Perger & Rubio, 2020

Type species
- Janus lucasi Taczanowski, 1871

Species
- 5, see text

= Sympolymnia =

Genus of spiders

Sympolymnia is a genus of ant-mimicking spiders in the family Salticidae (jumping spiders).

== Distribution ==
Sympolymnia is found from Mexico to Argentina.

== Etymology ==
The genus name is a combination of Ancient Greek "sym" ("with"), and Polymnia, one of the Greek muses.

S. cutleri honors arachnologist Bruce E. Cutler. "Shinahota" refers to a place with many ants in the local Yuracaré language.

== Species ==
As of January 2026, this genus includes five species:

- Sympolymnia cutleri Perger & Rubio, 2020 – Bolivia
- Sympolymnia edwardsi (Cutler, 1985) – Mexico to Costa Rica
- Sympolymnia lauretta (G. W. Peckham & E. G. Peckham, 1892) – Peru, Bolivia, Brazil, Argentina
- Sympolymnia lucasi (Taczanowski, 1871) – Peru, Colombia, Brazil, French Guiana
- Sympolymnia shinahota Perger & Rubio, 2020 – Bolivia, Brazil

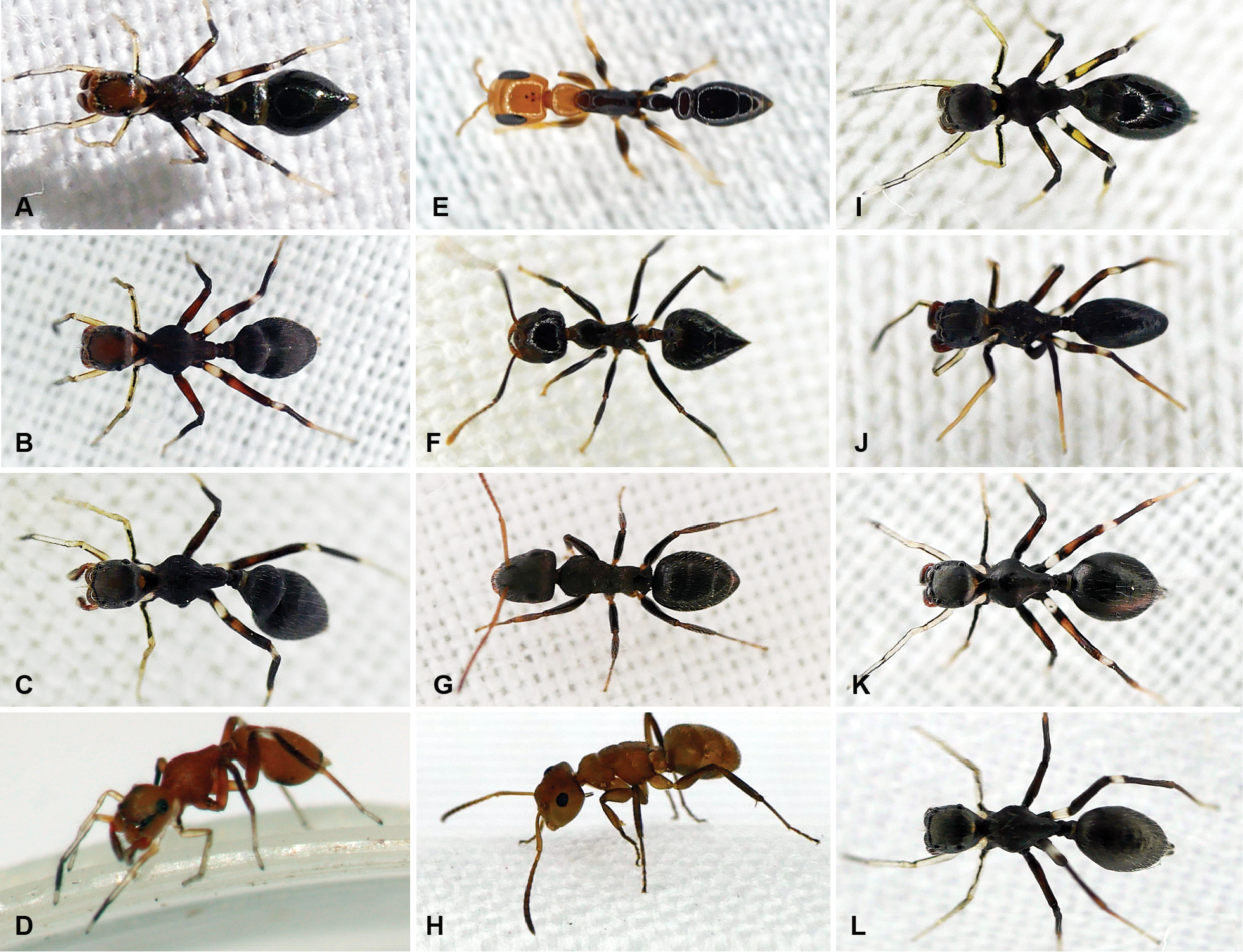
Photos of Sympolymnia species (A-D: S. shinahota, I-L: S. cutleri) and their ant models (E-H)
