= Orvilleus =

Scientific classification
- Kingdom: Animalia
- Phylum: Arthropoda
- Subphylum: Chelicerata
- Class: Arachnida
- Order: Araneae
- Infraorder: Araneomorphae
- Family: Salticidae
- Genus: Orvilleus; Chickering, 1946
- Species: O. crassus

Binomial name
- Orvilleus crassus Chickering, 1946

Genus of spiders

Orvilleus is a monotypic genus of Panamanian jumping spiders containing the single species, Orvilleus crassus. It was first described by Arthur Merton Chickering in 1946, and is only found in Panama.
