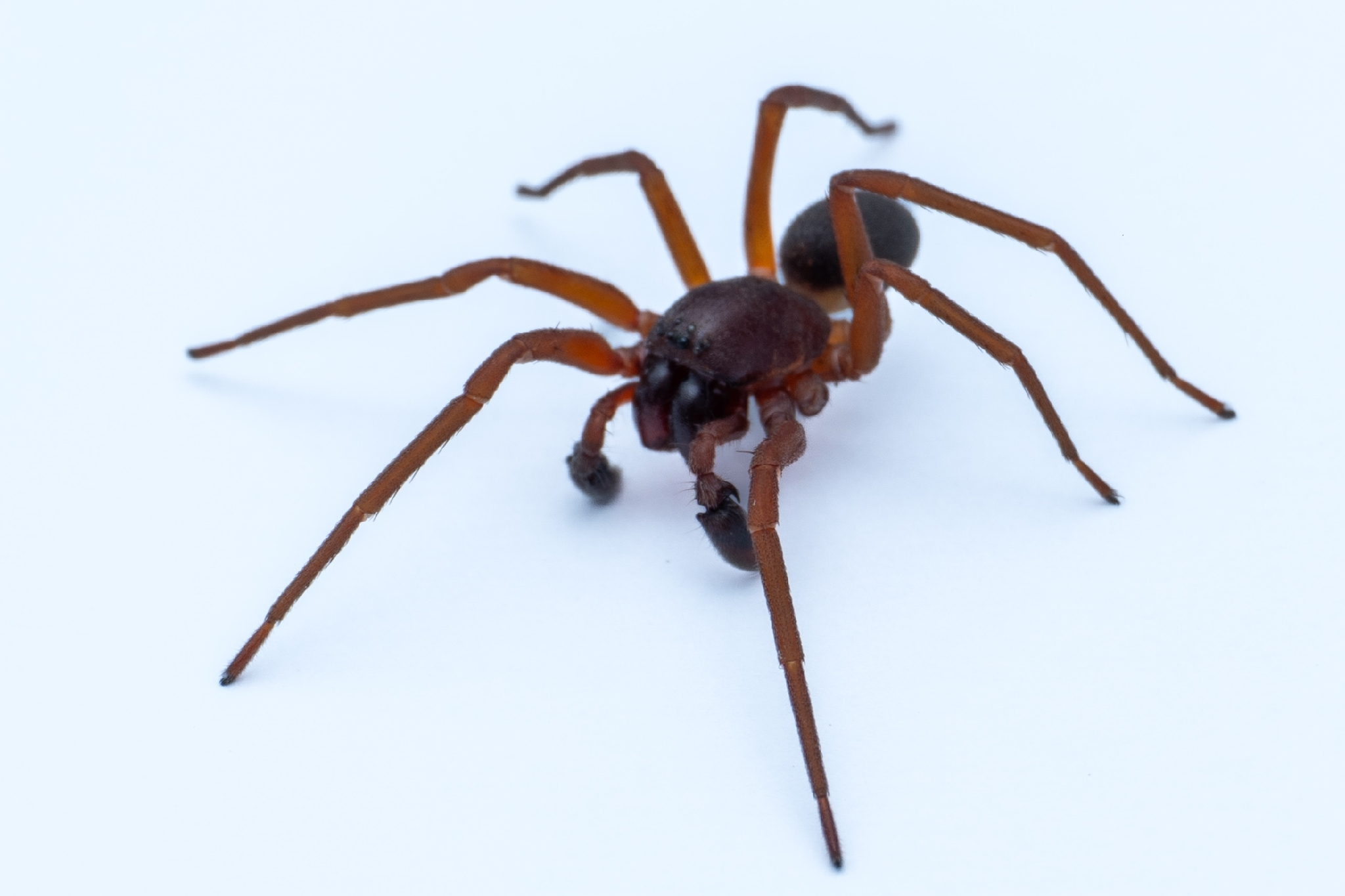
- Abapeba rioclaro

Scientific classification
- Kingdom: Animalia
- Phylum: Arthropoda
- Subphylum: Chelicerata
- Class: Arachnida
- Order: Araneae
- Infraorder: Araneomorphae
- Family: Corinnidae
- Genus: Abapeba; Bonaldo, 2000

Type species
- A. lacertosa (Simon, 1898)

Species
- 20, see text

= Abapeba =

Genus of spiders

Abapeba is a genus of Central and South American corinnid sac spiders first described by A. B. Bonaldo in 2000.

== Species ==
As of April 2019 it contains twenty species from Mexico and the Caribbean south to Brazil:

- Abapeba abalosi (Mello-Leitão, 1942) – Paraguay, Argentina
- Abapeba brevis (Taczanowski, 1874) – French Guiana
- Abapeba cayana (Taczanowski, 1874) – French Guiana
- Abapeba cleonei (Petrunkevitch, 1926) – St. Thomas
- Abapeba echinus (Simon, 1896) – Brazil
- Abapeba grassima (Chickering, 1972) – Panama
- Abapeba guanicae (Petrunkevitch, 1930) – Puerto Rico
- Abapeba hirta (Taczanowski, 1874) – French Guiana
- Abapeba hoeferi Bonaldo, 2000 – Brazil
- Abapeba kochi (Petrunkevitch, 1911) – South America
- Abapeba lacertosa (Simon, 1898) (type) – St. Vincent, Trinidad, northern South America
- Abapeba luctuosa (F. O. Pickard-Cambridge, 1899) – Mexico
- Abapeba lugubris (Schenkel, 1953) – Venezuela
- Abapeba pennata (Caporiacco, 1947) – Guyana
- Abapeba rioclaro Bonaldo, 2000 – Brazil
- Abapeba rufipes (Taczanowski, 1874) – French Guiana
- Abapeba saga (F. O. Pickard-Cambridge, 1899) – Mexico
- Abapeba sicarioides (Mello-Leitão, 1935) – Brazil
- Abapeba taruma Bonaldo, 2000 – Brazil
- Abapeba wheeleri (Petrunkevitch, 1930) – Puerto Rico
