= Carabella =

Scientific classification
- Kingdom: Animalia
- Phylum: Arthropoda
- Subphylum: Chelicerata
- Class: Arachnida
- Order: Araneae
- Infraorder: Araneomorphae
- Family: Salticidae
- Subfamily: Salticinae
- Genus: Carabella; Chickering, 1946

Type species
- C. banksi Chickering, 1946

Species
- C. banksi Chickering, 1946 – Panama; C. insignis (Banks, 1929) – Panama

Genus of spiders

Carabella is a genus of Panamanian jumping spiders that was first described by Arthur Merton Chickering in 1946. As of June 2019 it contains only two species, found only in Panama: C. banksi and C. insignis.
