= Abapeba cayana =

Scientific classification
- Domain: Eukaryota
- Kingdom: Animalia
- Phylum: Arthropoda
- Subphylum: Chelicerata
- Class: Arachnida
- Order: Araneae
- Infraorder: Araneomorphae
- Family: Corinnidae
- Genus: Abapeba
- Species: A. cayana

Binomial name
- Abapeba cayana (Taczanowski, 1874)

Species of spider

Abapeba cayana is a species of spider belonging to the family Corinnidae.

It is native to French Guiana.
