= Abapeba echinus =

Scientific classification
- Kingdom: Animalia
- Phylum: Arthropoda
- Subphylum: Chelicerata
- Class: Arachnida
- Order: Araneae
- Infraorder: Araneomorphae
- Family: Corinnidae
- Genus: Abapeba
- Species: A. echinus

Binomial name
- Abapeba echinus (Simon, 1896)

Species of spider

Abapeba echinus is a species of spider belonging to the family Corinnidae.

It is native to Brazil.
