= Abapeba cleonei =

Scientific classification
- Domain: Eukaryota
- Kingdom: Animalia
- Phylum: Arthropoda
- Subphylum: Chelicerata
- Class: Arachnida
- Order: Araneae
- Infraorder: Araneomorphae
- Family: Corinnidae
- Genus: Abapeba
- Species: A. cleonei

Binomial name
- Abapeba cleonei (Petrunkevitc, 1926)

Species of spider

Abapeba cleonei is a species of spider belonging to the family Corinnidae.

It is native to St. Thomas.
