= Hindumanes karnatakaensis =

Scientific classification
- Kingdom: Animalia
- Phylum: Arthropoda
- Subphylum: Chelicerata
- Class: Arachnida
- Order: Araneae
- Infraorder: Araneomorphae
- Family: Salticidae
- Genus: Hindumanes
- Species: H. karnatakaensis

Binomial name
- Hindumanes karnatakaensis (Tikader & Biswas, 1978)

Species of spider

Hindumanes karnatakaensis is a species of spider in the family Salticidae, found in India.
