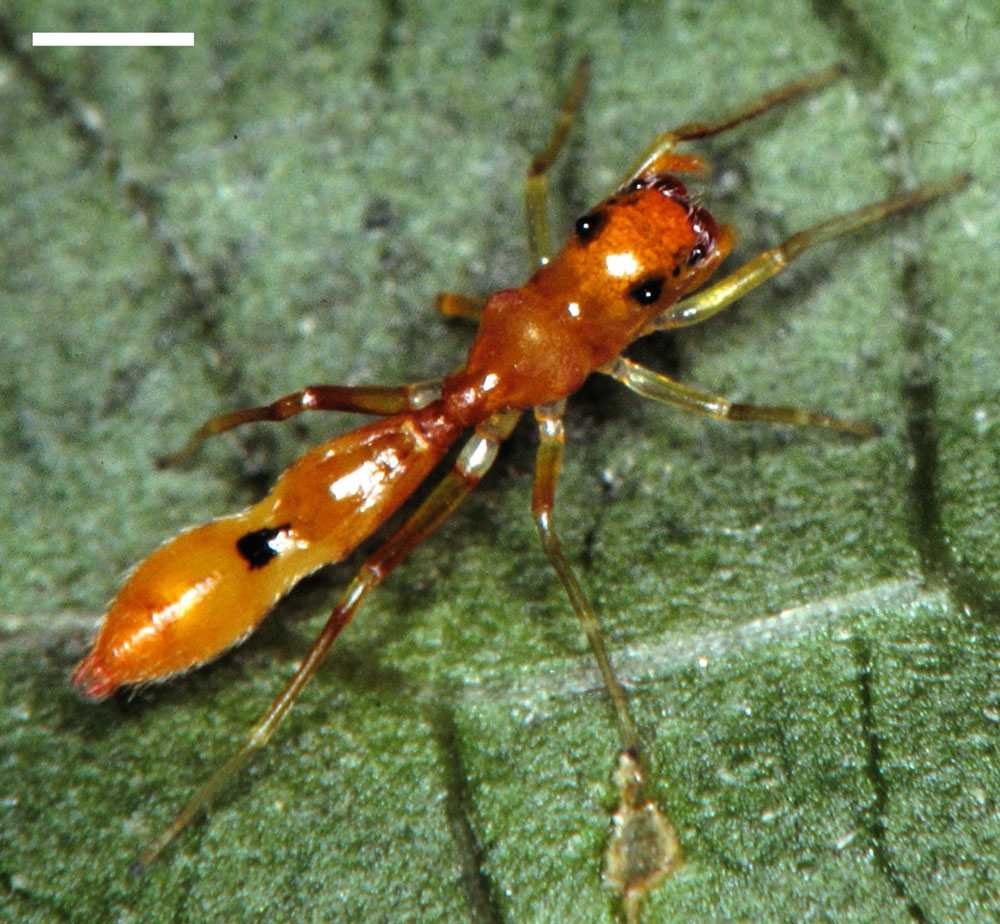

Scientific classification
- Kingdom: Animalia
- Phylum: Arthropoda
- Subphylum: Chelicerata
- Class: Arachnida
- Order: Araneae
- Infraorder: Araneomorphae
- Family: Salticidae
- Genus: Synemosyna
- Species: S. petrunkevitchi

Binomial name
- Synemosyna petrunkevitchi (Chapin, 1922)

= Synemosyna petrunkevitchi =

Species of spider

Synemosyna petrunkevitchi is a spider in the family Salticidae (jumping spiders). The distribution range of Synemosyna petrunkevitchi includes the United States and Cuba.
