= Myrmecium bifasciatum =

Scientific classification
- Kingdom: Animalia
- Phylum: Arthropoda
- Subphylum: Chelicerata
- Class: Arachnida
- Order: Araneae
- Infraorder: Araneomorphae
- Family: Corinnidae
- Genus: Myrmecium
- Species: M. bifasciatum

Binomial name
- Myrmecium bifasciatum Taczanowski, 1874

Species of spider

Myrmecium bifasciatum is an ant-mimicking spider species found in Brazil and French Guiana.
