= Lyssomanes elegans =

Scientific classification
- Kingdom: Animalia
- Phylum: Arthropoda
- Subphylum: Chelicerata
- Class: Arachnida
- Order: Araneae
- Infraorder: Araneomorphae
- Family: Salticidae
- Genus: Lyssomanes
- Species: L. elegans

Binomial name
- Lyssomanes elegans F. O. Pickard-Cambridge, 1900

Species of spider

Lyssomanes elegans is a species of spiders in the jumping spider family, Salticidae. It is found from Mexico to Brazil.
