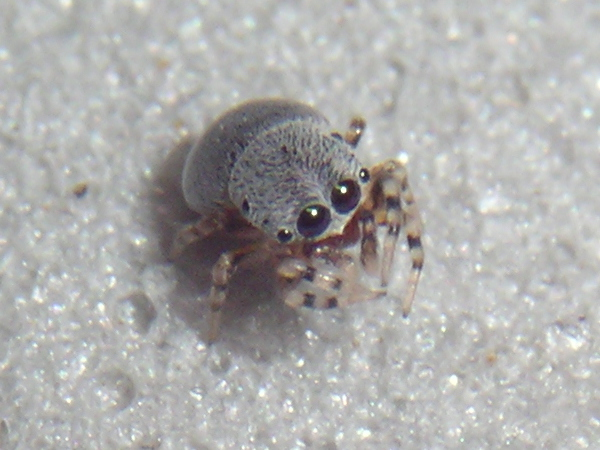
- Female Cylistella from Ecuador

Scientific classification
- Kingdom: Animalia
- Phylum: Arthropoda
- Subphylum: Chelicerata
- Class: Arachnida
- Order: Araneae
- Infraorder: Araneomorphae
- Family: Salticidae
- Subfamily: Salticinae
- Genus: Cylistella; Simon, 1901

Type species
- C. cuprea (Simon, 1864)

Species
- 7, see text

= Cylistella =

Genus of spiders

Cylistella is a genus of jumping spiders that was first described by Eugène Louis Simon in 1901.

== Species ==
As of June 2019 it contains seven species, found in Panama, Costa Rica, Brazil, and Mexico:

- Cylistella adjacens (O. Pickard-Cambridge, 1896) – Mexico, Costa Rica
- Cylistella castanea Petrunkevitch, 1925 – Panama
- Cylistella coccinelloides (O. Pickard-Cambridge, 1869) – Brazil
- Cylistella cuprea (Simon, 1864) (type) – Brazil
- Cylistella fulva Chickering, 1946 – Panama
- Cylistella sanctipauli Soares & Camargo, 1948 – Brazil
- Cylistella scarabaeoides (O. Pickard-Cambridge, 1894) – Mexico, Panama
