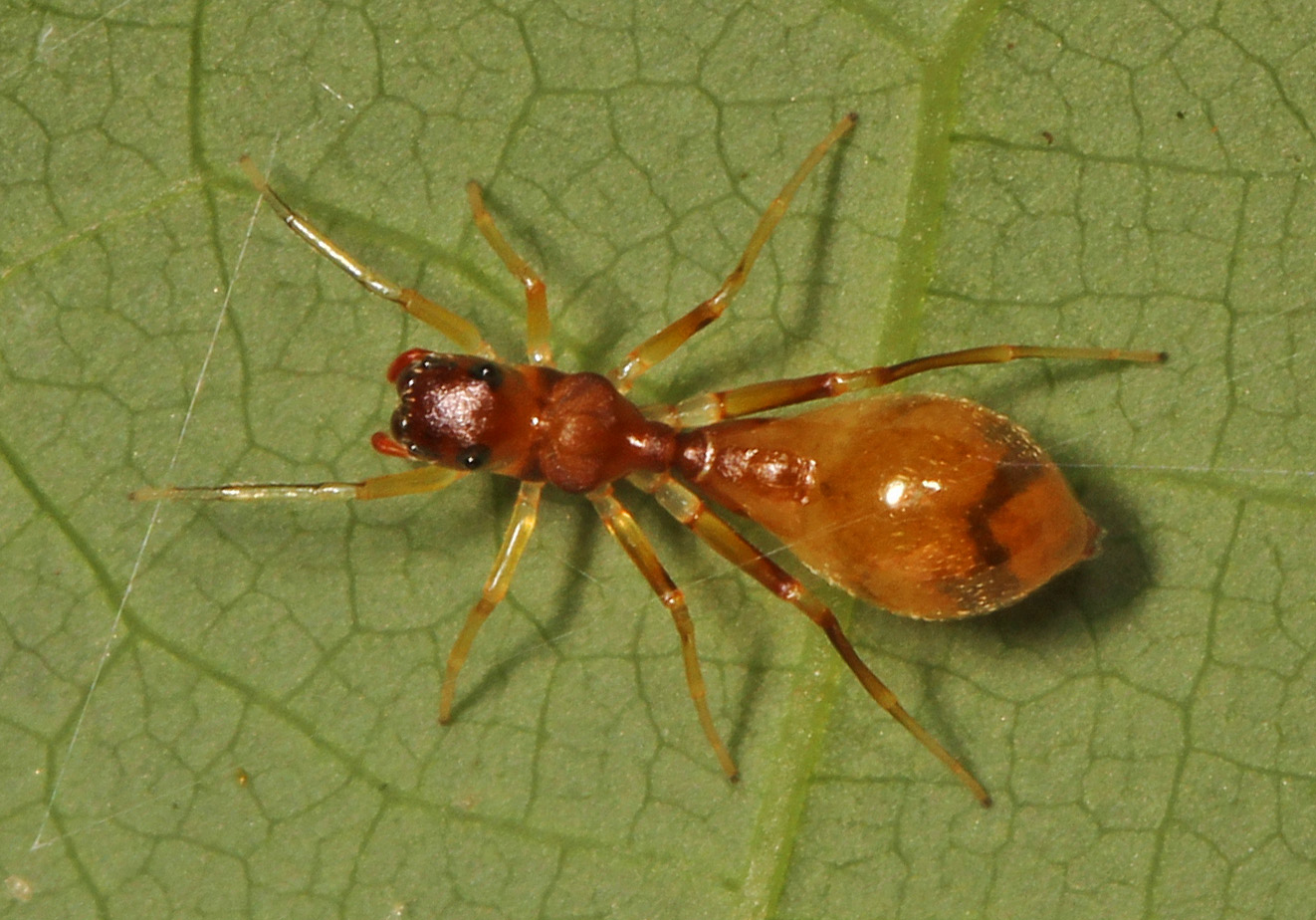
- Synemosyna formica
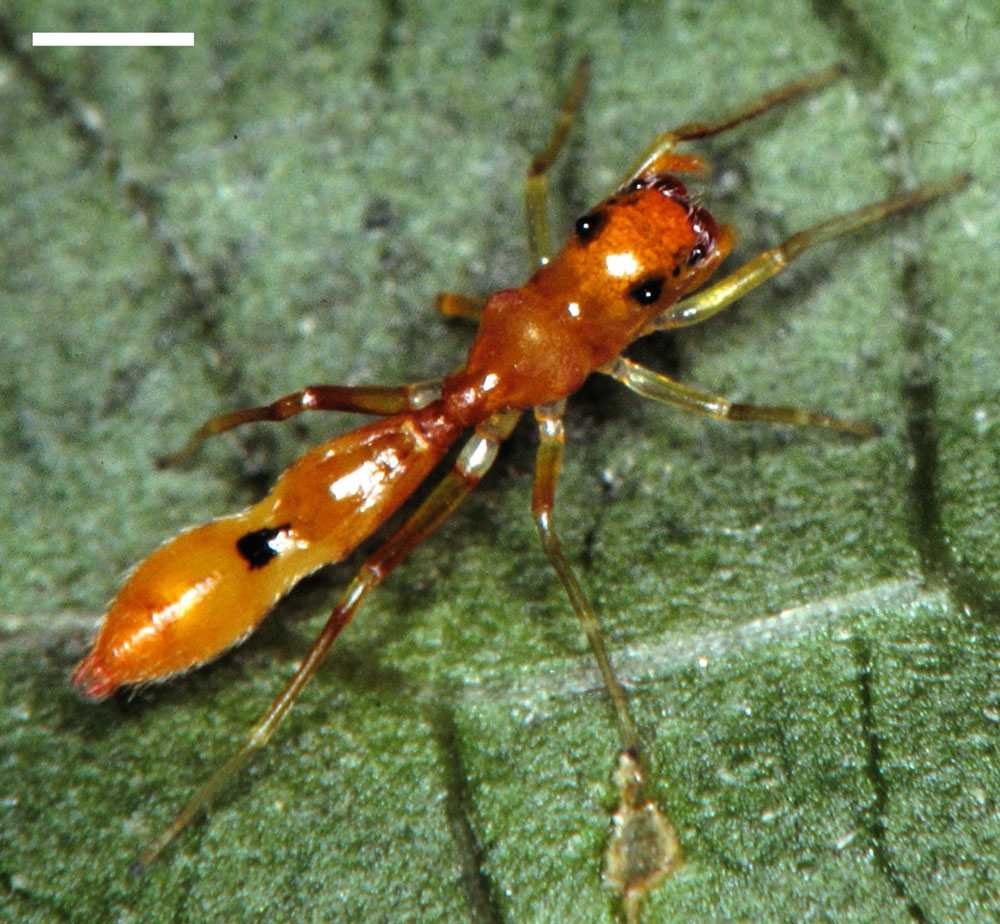
- S. petrunkevitchi

Scientific classification
- Kingdom: Animalia
- Phylum: Arthropoda
- Subphylum: Chelicerata
- Class: Arachnida
- Order: Araneae
- Infraorder: Araneomorphae
- Family: Salticidae
- Subfamily: Salticinae
- Genus: Synemosyna; Hentz, 1846

Type species
- S. formica Hentz, 1846

Species
- 20, see text

Synonyms
- Simonella Peckham & Peckham, 1885

= Synemosyna =

Genus of spiders

Synemosyna is a genus of ant mimicking jumping spiders that was first described by Nicholas Marcellus Hentz in 1846.

== Species ==
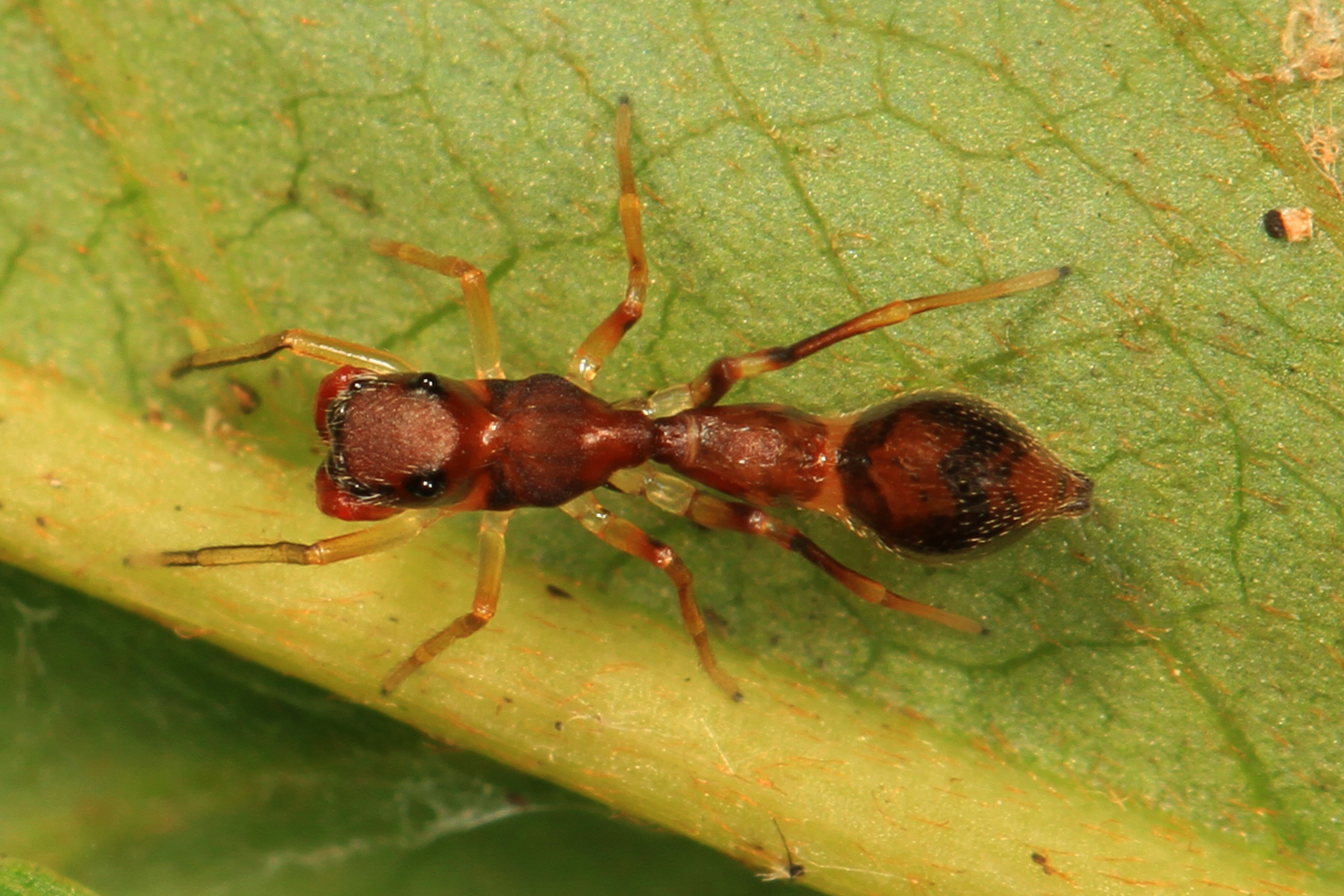
S. formica from Maryland

As of August 2019 it contains twenty species, found in the Caribbean, Central America, South America, the United States, and Mexico:

- Synemosyna americana (Peckham & Peckham, 1885) – Mexico to Venezuela
- Synemosyna ankeli Cutler & Müller, 1991 – Colombia
- Synemosyna aschnae Makhan, 2006 – Suriname
- Synemosyna aurantiaca (Mello-Leitão, 1917) – Colombia, Brazil, Argentina
- Synemosyna decipiens (O. Pickard-Cambridge, 1896) – Mexico, Guatemala
- Synemosyna edwardsi Cutler, 1985 – Mexico to Costa Rica
- Synemosyna formica Hentz, 1846 (type) – USA
- Synemosyna hentzi Peckham & Peckham, 1892 – Brazil
- Synemosyna invemar Cutler & Müller, 1991 – Colombia
- Synemosyna lauretta Peckham & Peckham, 1892 – Brazil, Argentina
- Synemosyna lucasi (Taczanowski, 1871) – Colombia to Peru and Guyana
- Synemosyna maddisoni Cutler, 1985 – Mexico, Guatemala
- Synemosyna myrmeciaeformis (Taczanowski, 1871) – Venezuela, Brazil, French Guiana
- Synemosyna nicaraguaensis Cutler, 1993 – Nicaragua
- Synemosyna paraensis Galiano, 1967 – Brazil, French Guiana
- Synemosyna petrunkevitchi (Chapin, 1922) – USA, Cuba
- Synemosyna scutata (Mello-Leitão, 1943) – Brazil
- Synemosyna smithi Peckham & Peckham, 1894 – Cuba, St. Vincent
- Synemosyna taperae (Mello-Leitão, 1933) – Brazil
- Synemosyna ubicki Cutler, 1988 – Costa Rica
