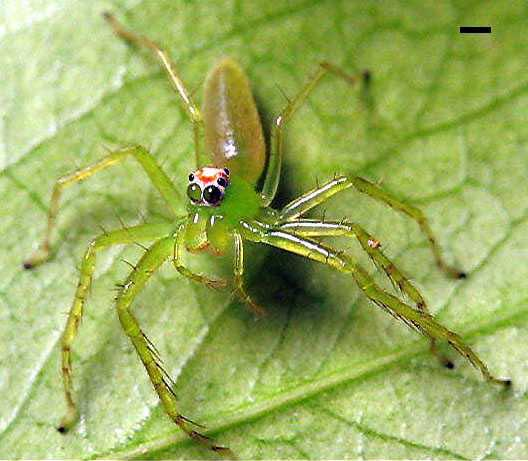
- female Lyssomanes viridis (scale = 1 mm)

Scientific classification
- Kingdom: Animalia
- Phylum: Arthropoda
- Subphylum: Chelicerata
- Class: Arachnida
- Order: Araneae
- Infraorder: Araneomorphae
- Family: Salticidae
- Subfamily: Lyssomaninae; Blackwall, 1877

Genera
- See text.

= Lyssomaninae =

Subfamily of spiders

Lyssomaninae is a subfamily of jumping spiders. It includes four genera, three from the New World.

== Description ==
Members of the subfamily Lyssomaninae are mostly green or yellow, and have long legs compared to other salticids. The anterior lateral eyes form a second row behind the anterior median eyes. The male palpal bulb has a membraneous conductor.

== Taxonomy ==
The subfamily Lyssomaninae, as described in 1976 by María Elena Galiano and in 1980 by Wanless, was agreed by both authors not to be monophyletic, and to consist of three groups. It was formally divided into three subfamilies, Onomastinae, Asemoneinae and Lyssomaninae s.s., by Wayne Maddison in 2015. He included only two genera, Chinoscopus and Lyssomanes, although noting that Lyssomanes might be paraphyletic. Molecular data strongly supported the monophyly of the group defined in this way. In 2016, Maddison described a new genus, Sumakuru, which he placed in Lyssomaninae. Maddison originally kept the genus Hindumanes in the subfamily Asemoneinae, where it had been placed previously; it had not been included in molecular phylogenetic studies. In 2017, Hindumanes, whose type species was originally placed in Lyssomanes, was moved to Lyssomaninae, on the basis of the similarity of the male palpal bulb.

=== Genera ===
As of August 2020, four genera have been placed in the subfamily Lyssomaninae:

- Chinoscopus Simon, 1901 — South America
- Hindumanes Logunov, 2004 — India
- Lyssomanes Hentz, 1845 — Florida to South America
- Sumakuru Maddison, 2016 — Colombia, Ecuador
