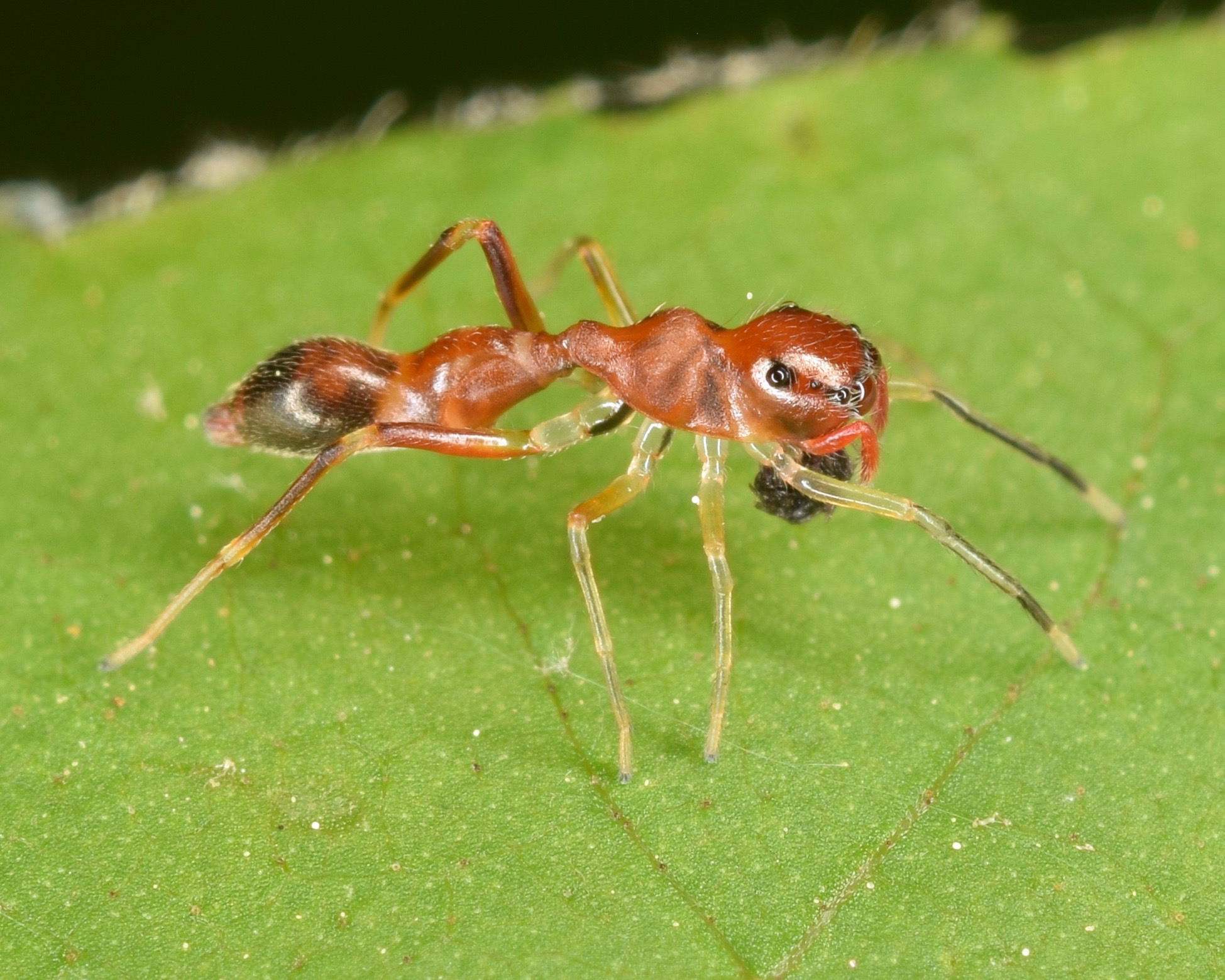

Scientific classification
- Kingdom: Animalia
- Phylum: Arthropoda
- Subphylum: Chelicerata
- Class: Arachnida
- Order: Araneae
- Infraorder: Araneomorphae
- Family: Salticidae
- Genus: Synemosyna
- Species: S. formica

Binomial name
- Synemosyna formica Hentz, 1846

Synonyms
- Janus gibberosus C. L. Koch, 1846; Myrmecium lunatum Simon, 1897; Myrmecium rubrum Mello-Leitão, 1932; Synemosyna lunata (Simon, 1897)

= Synemosyna formica =

Species of spider

Synemosyna formica is a species of ant-mimicking jumping spider. It is found in the eastern United States and parts of Canada. The first pair of legs are elevated to imitate ant antennae, unlike other ant mimics such as the genus Synageles which use their second pair of legs.

Drawing of female by CL Koch (1846)

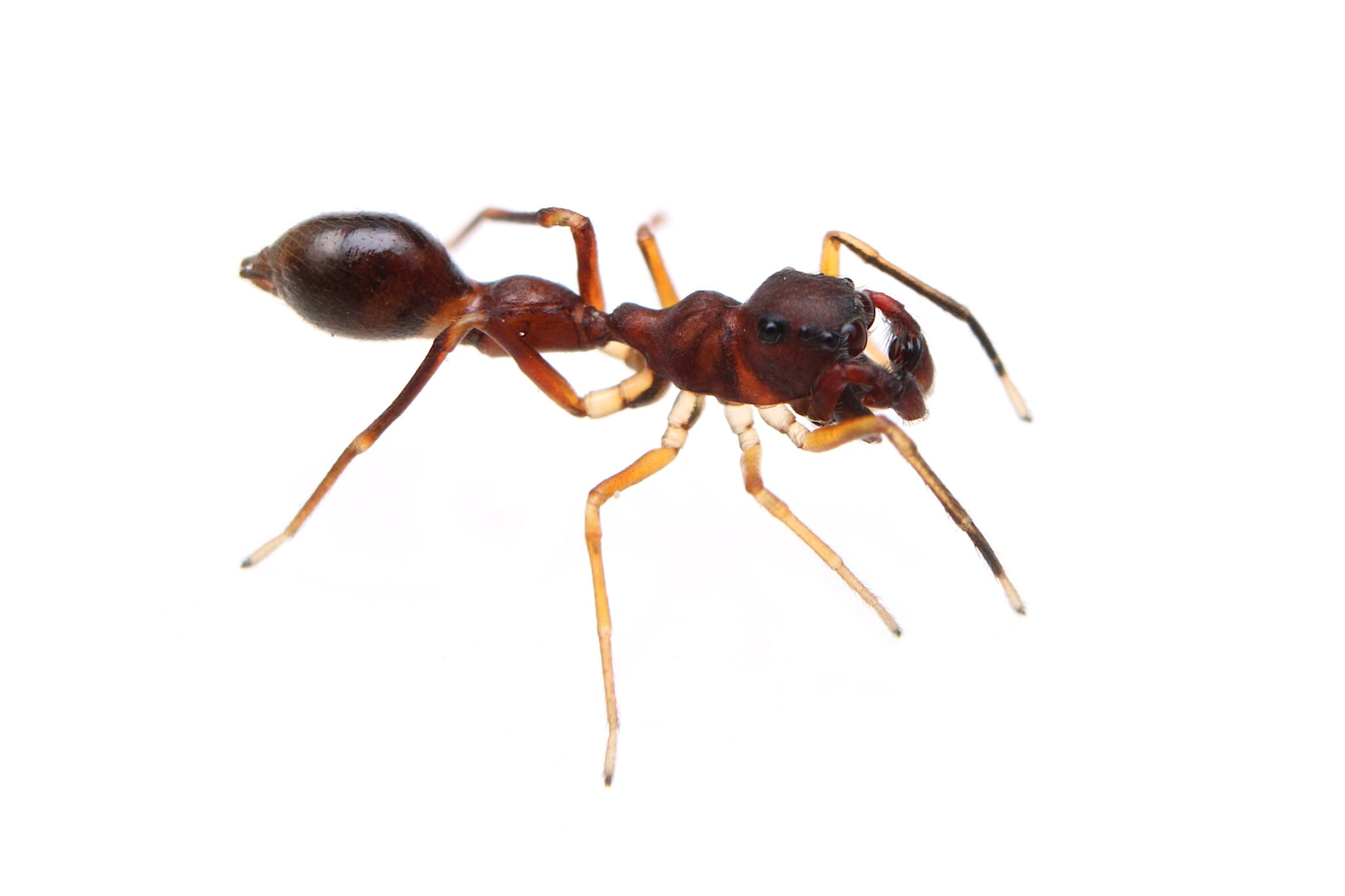

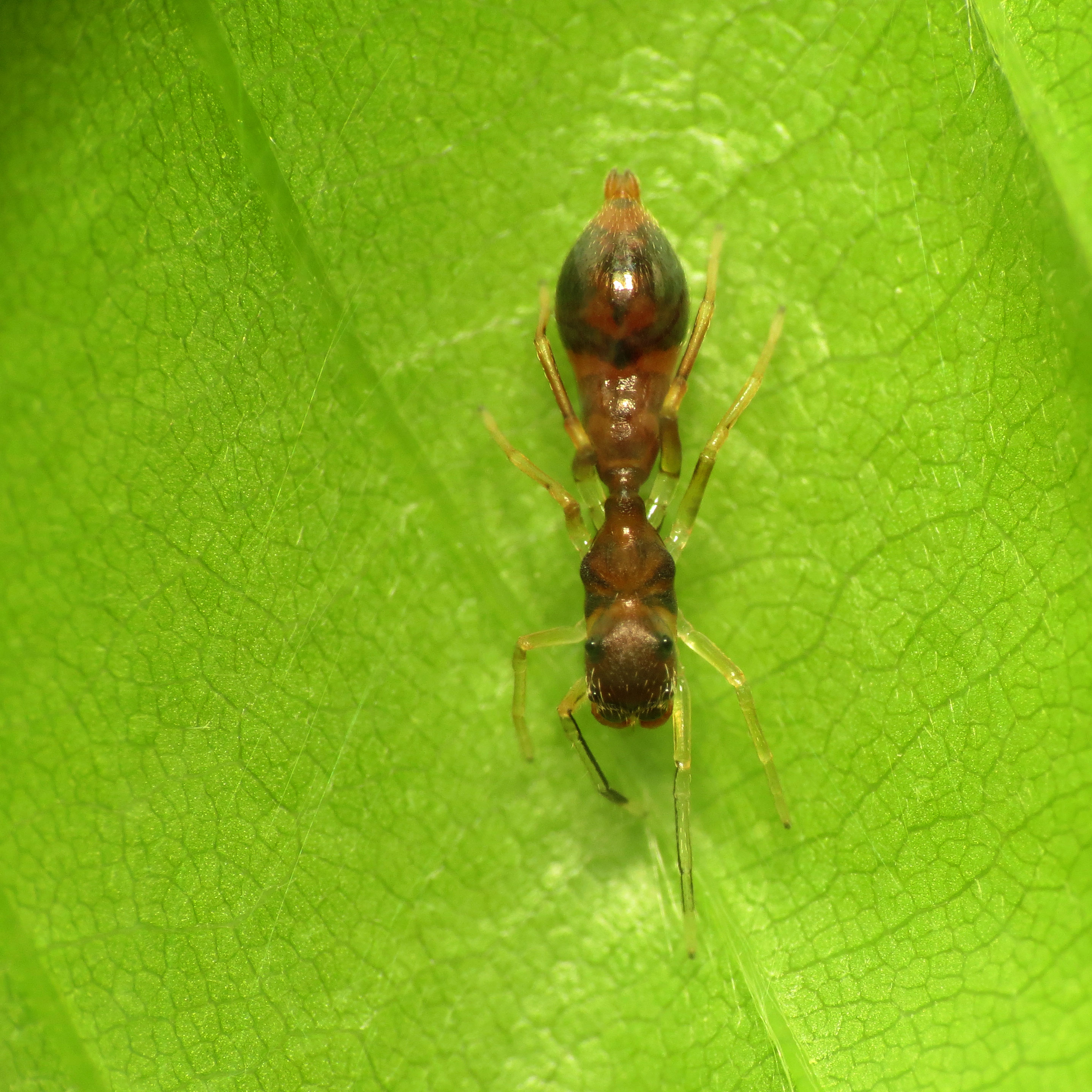
