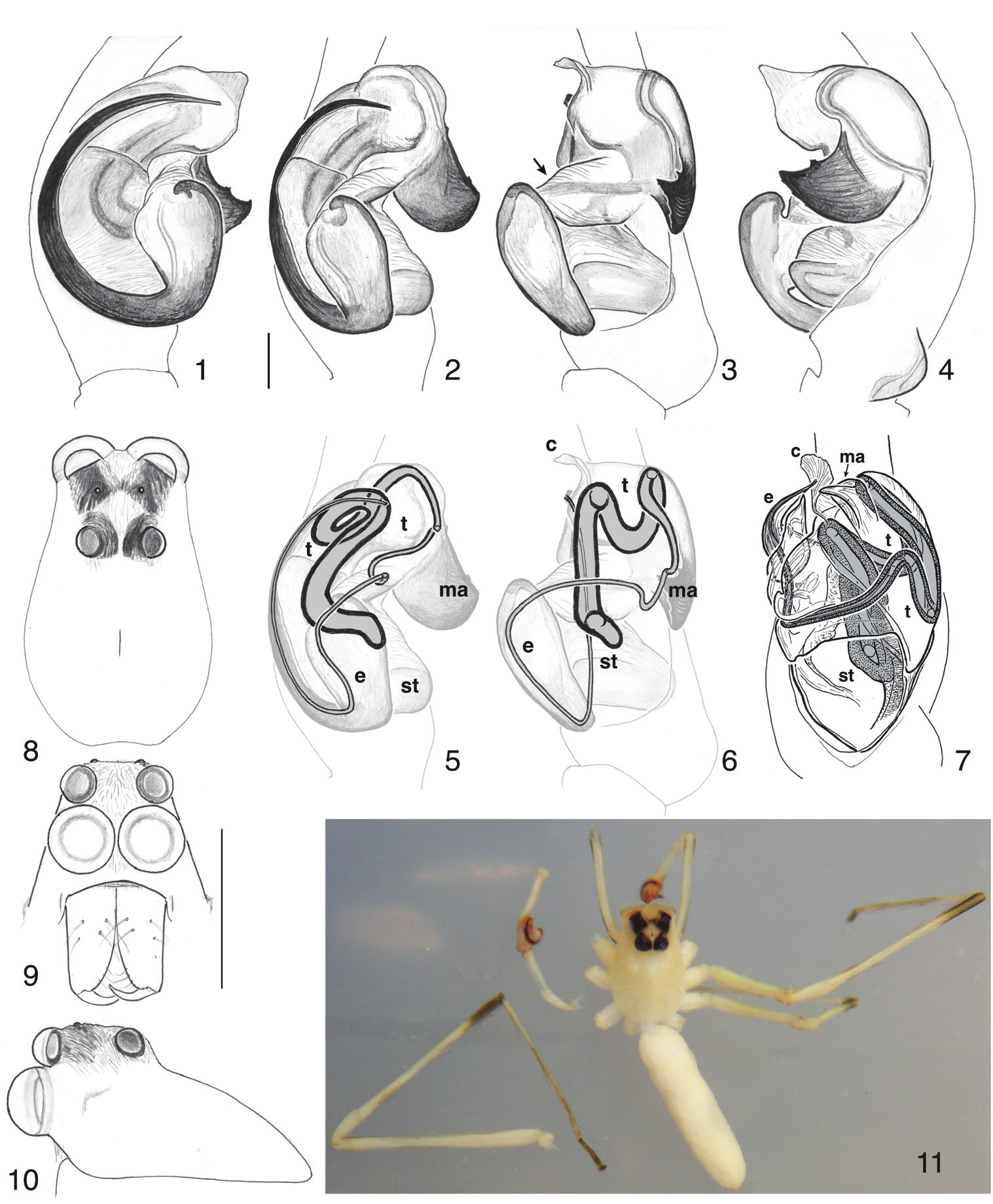
- Holotype of Sumakuru bigal

Scientific classification
- Kingdom: Animalia
- Phylum: Arthropoda
- Subphylum: Chelicerata
- Class: Arachnida
- Order: Araneae
- Infraorder: Araneomorphae
- Family: Salticidae
- Subfamily: Lyssomaninae
- Genus: Sumakuru; Maddison, 2016

Species
- See text.

= Sumakuru =

Genus of spiders

Sumakuru is a genus of jumping spiders in the subfamily Lyssomaninae. It was first described in 2016 by Wayne Maddison. Both males and females are very small compared with other species in Lyssomaninae. As of 2017, it contains two species:

- Sumakuru bigal Maddison, 2016 – Ecuador
- Sumakuru felca Galvis, 2017 – Colombia
