= Chinoscopus =

Scientific classification
- Kingdom: Animalia
- Phylum: Arthropoda
- Subphylum: Chelicerata
- Class: Arachnida
- Order: Araneae
- Infraorder: Araneomorphae
- Family: Salticidae
- Subfamily: Lyssomaninae
- Genus: Chinoscopus; Simon, 1901

Type species
- C. gracilis (Taczanowski, 1872)

Species
- 4, see text

Genus of spiders

Chinoscopus is a genus of jumping spiders that was first described by Eugène Louis Simon in 1901.

== Species ==
As of June 2019 it contains four species, found only in South America, Panama, and on Trinidad:

- Chinoscopus ernsti (Simon, 1900) – Venezuela
- Chinoscopus flavus (Peckham, Peckham & Wheeler, 1889) – Panama, Colombia
- Chinoscopus gracilis (Taczanowski, 1872) (type) – Ecuador, Brazil, French Guiana
- Chinoscopus maculipes Crane, 1943 – Trinidad, Venezuela, Brazil, Guyana, French Guiana, Ecuador
