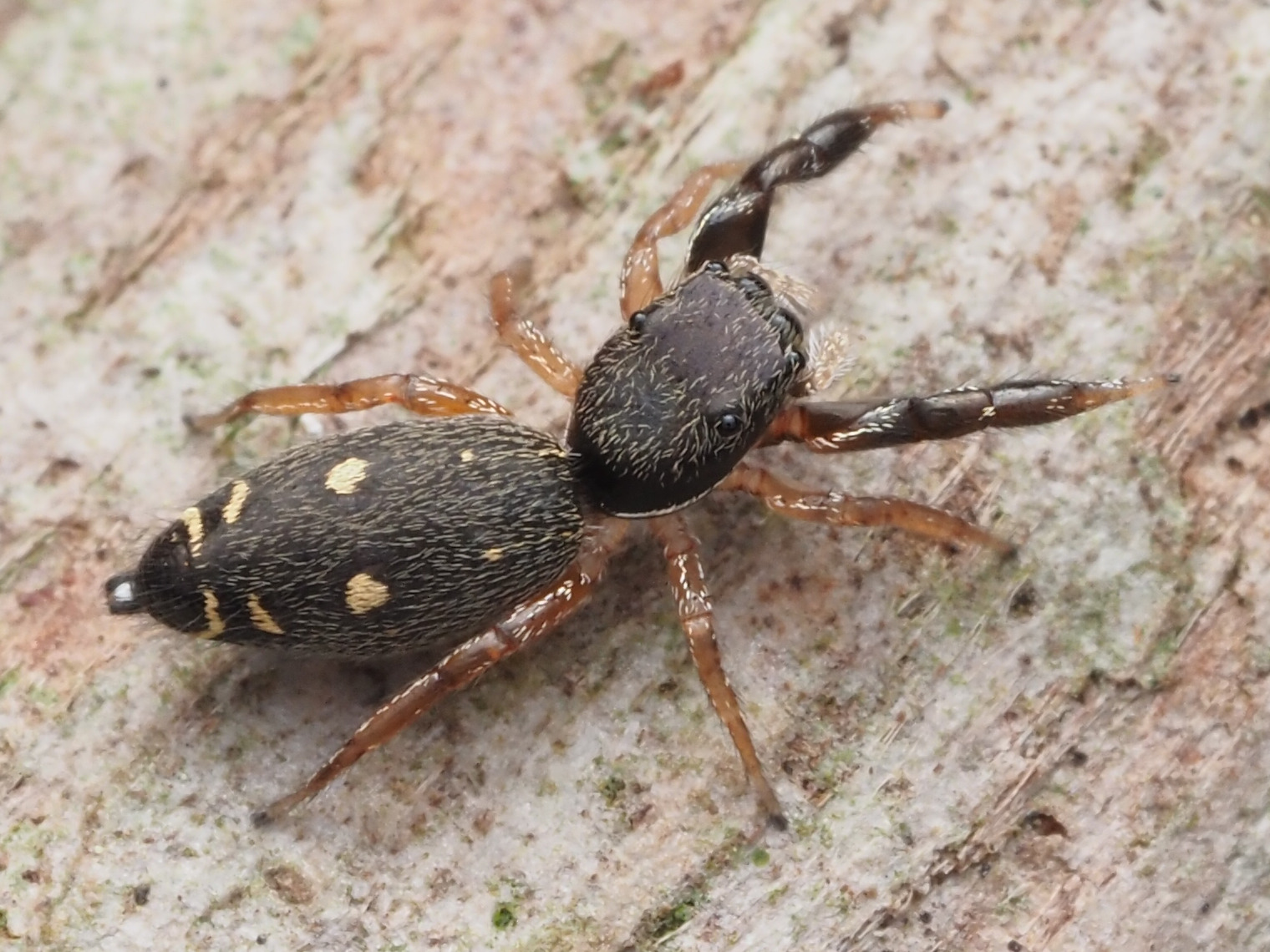
- Female Metacyrba punctata in Florida
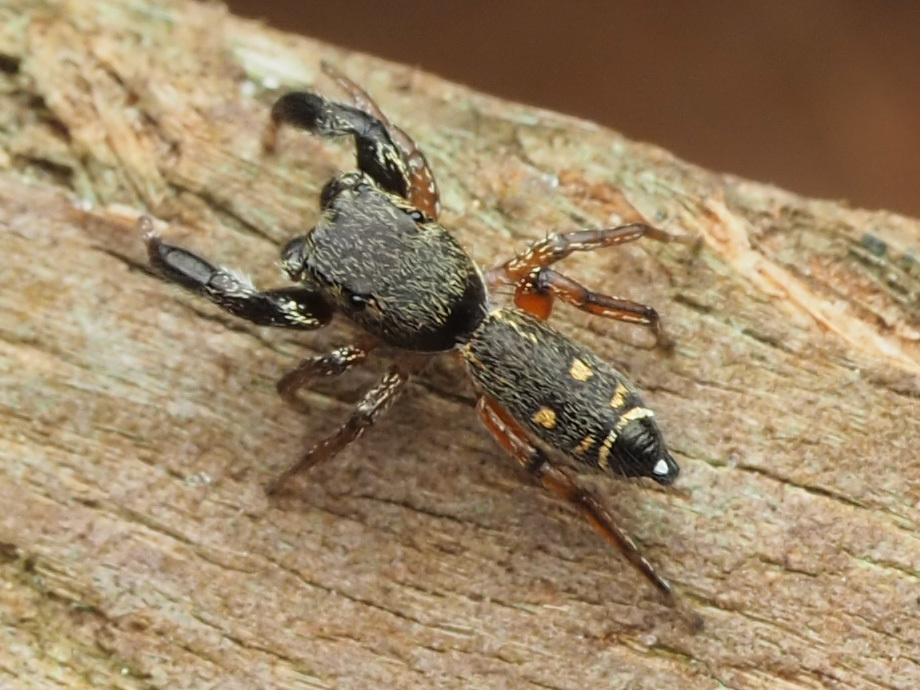
- Male Metacyrba punctata in Florida

Scientific classification
- Kingdom: Animalia
- Phylum: Arthropoda
- Subphylum: Chelicerata
- Class: Arachnida
- Order: Araneae
- Infraorder: Araneomorphae
- Family: Salticidae
- Genus: Metacyrba
- Species: M. punctata

Binomial name
- Metacyrba punctata (Peckham & Peckham, 1894)

= Metacyrba punctata =

Species of spider

Metacyrba punctata is a species of jumping spider. It is found from the southern United States to Ecuador.
