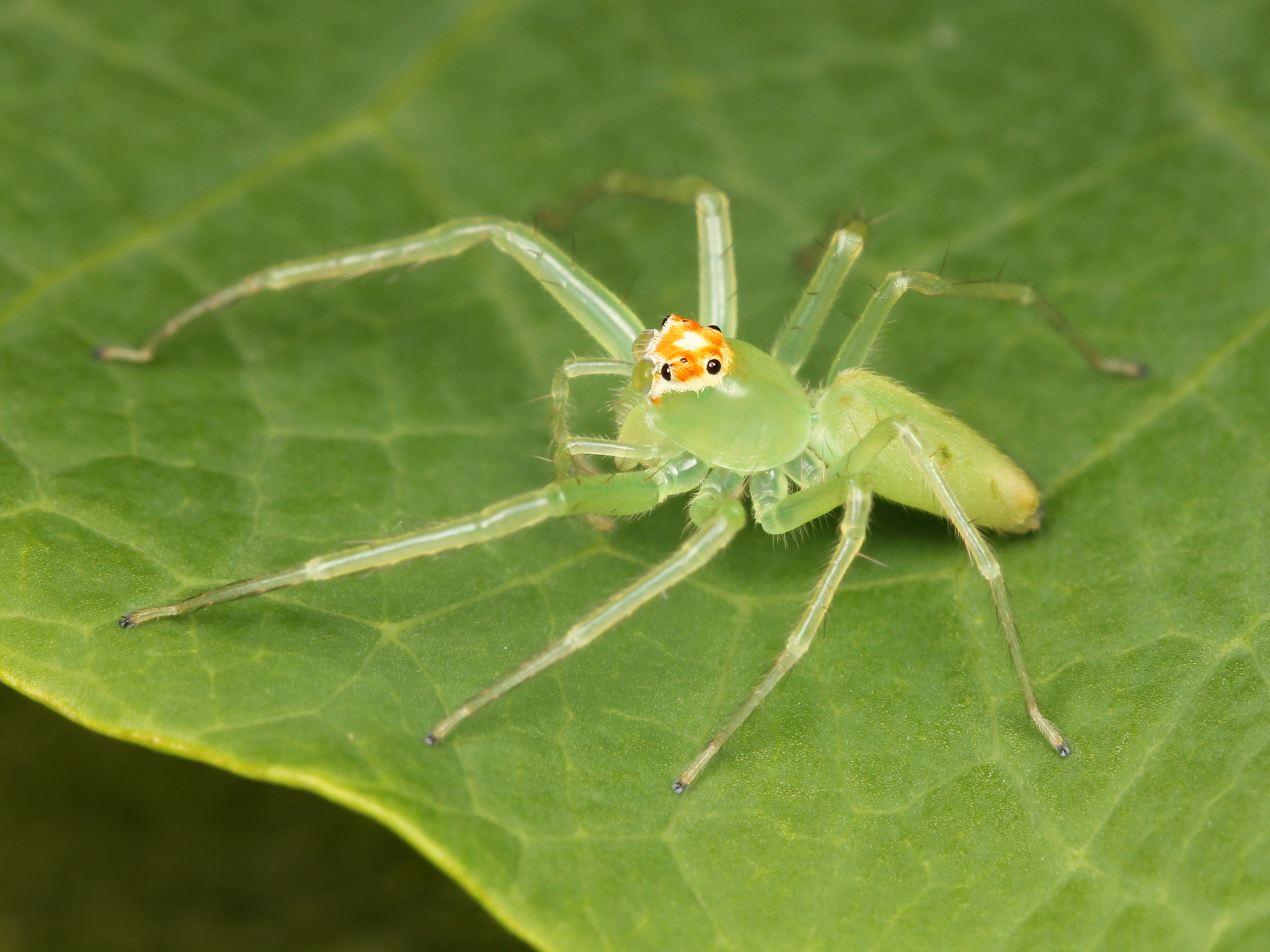
- A mature female Lyssomanes viridis at rest on a leaf

Scientific classification
- Kingdom: Animalia
- Phylum: Arthropoda
- Subphylum: Chelicerata
- Class: Arachnida
- Order: Araneae
- Infraorder: Araneomorphae
- Family: Salticidae
- Genus: Lyssomanes
- Species: L. viridis

Binomial name
- Lyssomanes viridis (Walckenaer, 1837)

Synonyms
- Attus viridis Walckenaer, 1837; Tetragnatha lutea Walckenaer, 1841

= Lyssomanes viridis =

Species of spider

Lyssomanes viridis, commonly known as the magnolia green jumper, is a species of jumping spider of the genus Lyssomanes, for which it is the type species. The species' native range extends through much of the United States.

== Taxonomy ==
L. viridis is the type species of the genus Lyssomanes, which is thought to be one of the earliest-to-evolve genera of jumping spiders, representing a link between the anatomical morphologies and behaviors of more primitive spiders and the family Salticidae.

== Physiology and morphology ==
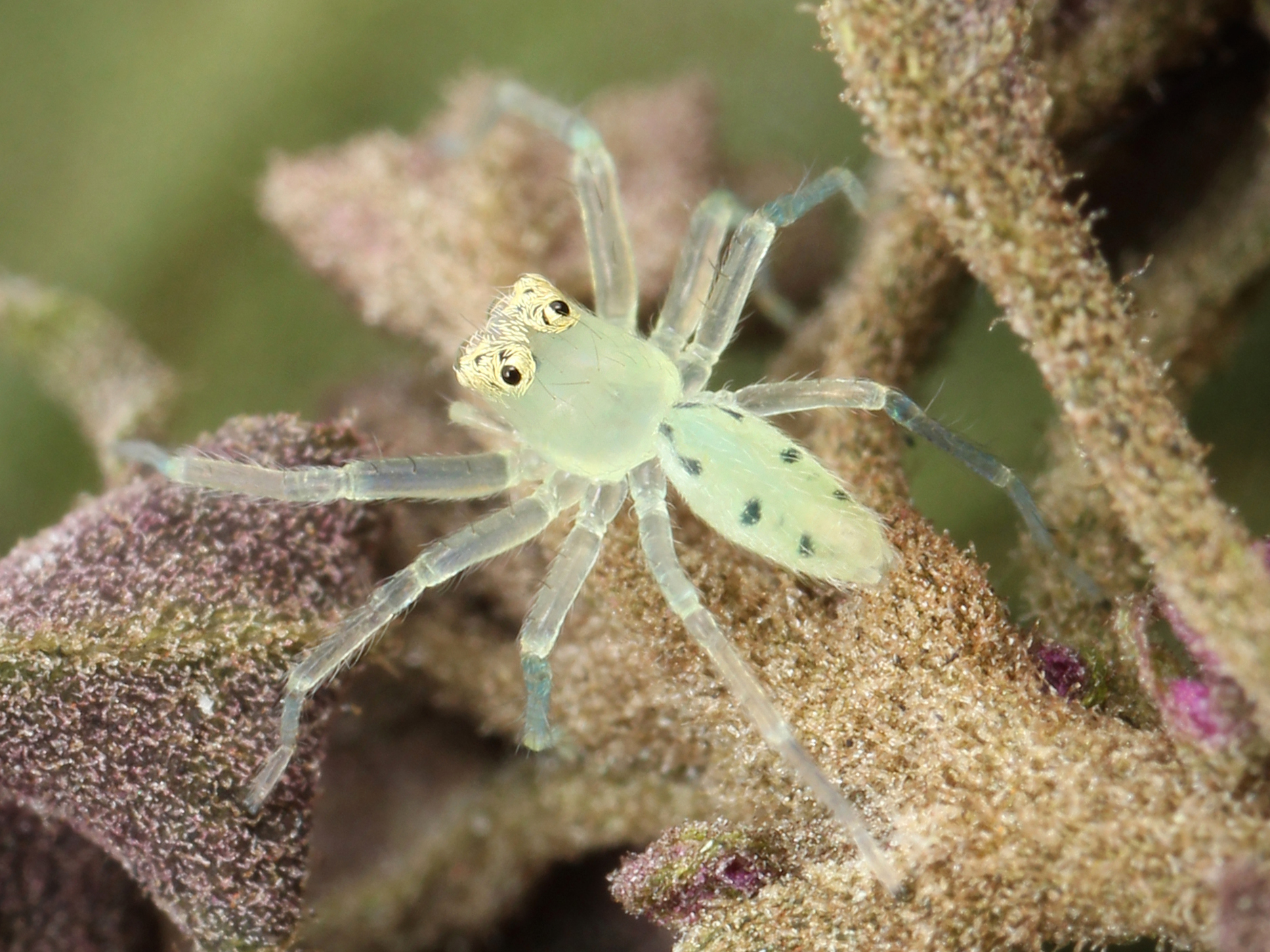
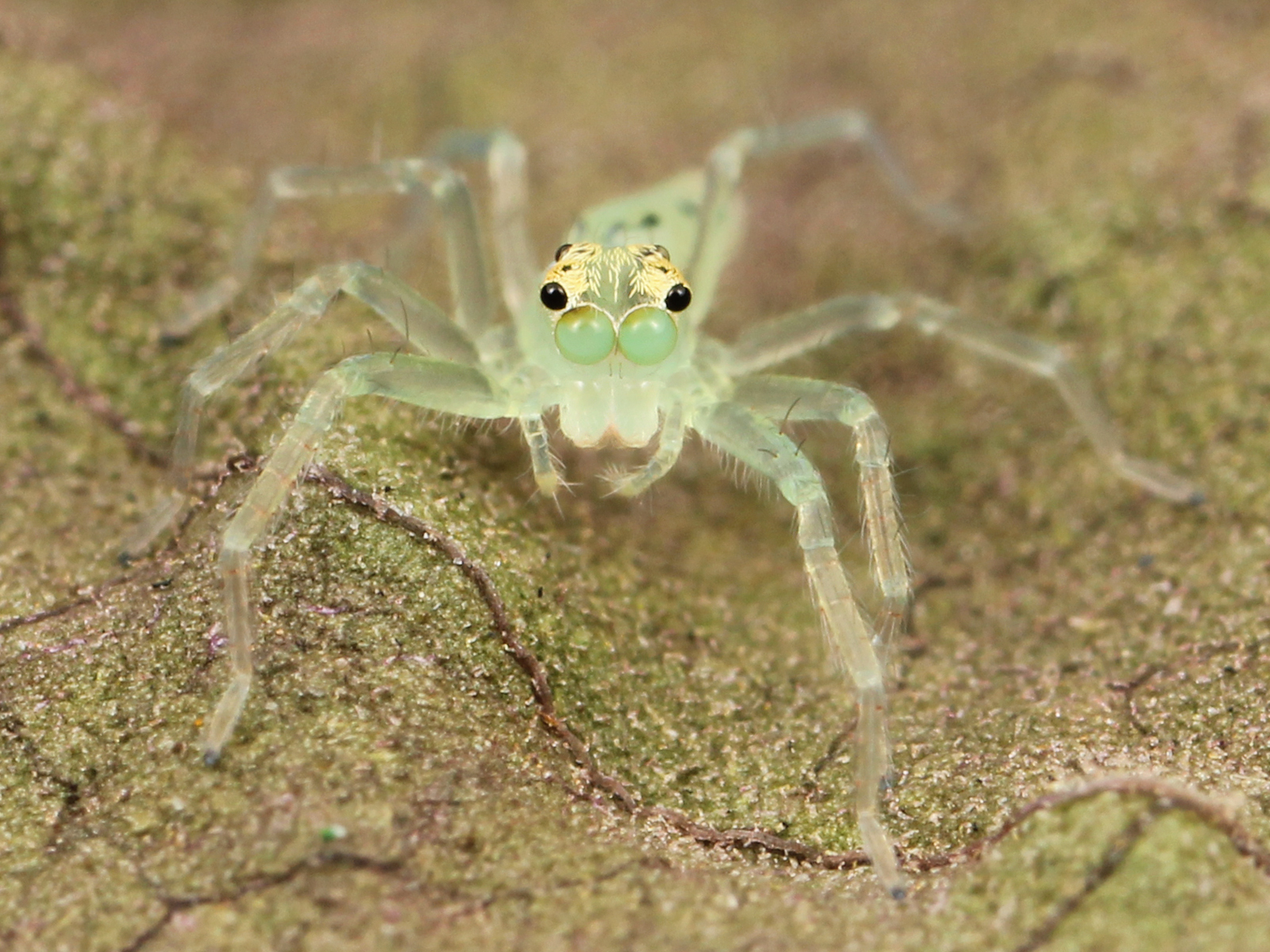
An immature female specimen

The magnolia green jumper is small for a jumping spider, with adult females measuring 7-8mm and adult males 5-6mm. Most specimens appear as a pale, partially translucent green (from which they derive a part of their taxonomic and common names) with a small fringe of scales which may appear red, orange, yellow or white on the crown of the head, framing the eyes. L. viridis has longer legs, relative to the body, than most jumping spiders, with a smaller leap size (approximately three to four times their body length). However, L. viridis is similar to most other salticids in having highly complex eyes and well-developed vision that is amongst the most acute of all arthropods, as well as complex visual cognition behaviors; the anterior median eyes have the telephoto quality for which jumping spiders are known, but also share features with the eyes of species that evolved earlier than salticids.

As with many other Salticidae, male L. viridis have brightly-colored and large chelicerae which are used as weapons in contests, and similarly colored forelegs that are waved during visual agonistic displays. The corresponding appendages of females have more muted colors and have significantly lower allometric slopes than those of males. When males encounter each other, they will wave their forelegs and often approach one another until one of them retreats, with a physical fight resulting if neither retreats. During fights, males press their chelicerae and forelegs against each other and push until one tires and retreats.

Courtship and mating behaviors require complex visual and tactile signals.

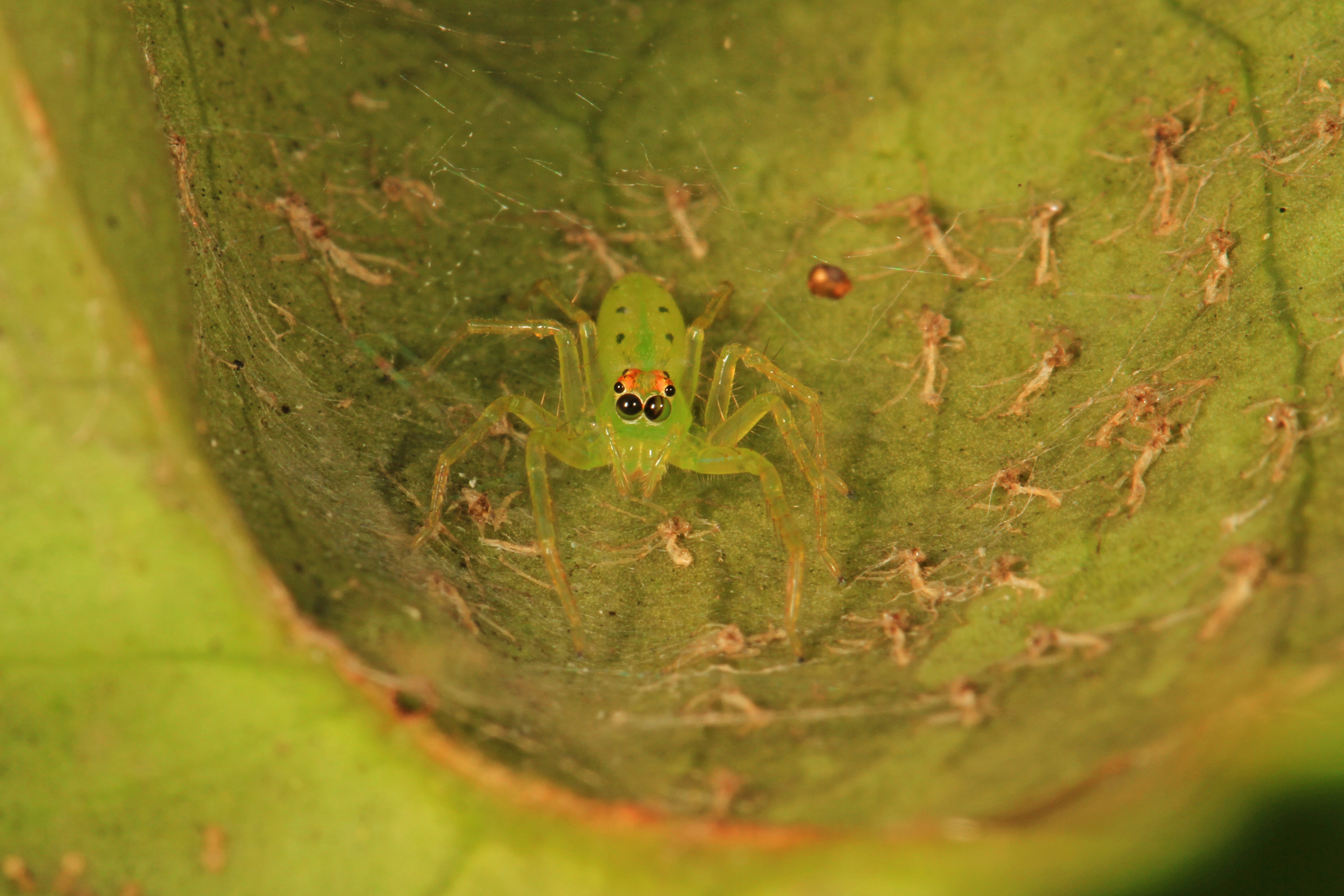
An adult female residing in a nest within the fold of a leaf

== Ecology ==
True to its common name, the species often prefers the broad leaves of magnolia trees, particularly in warm, humid forests, but can also be found in dryer climates on oak, maple, pine, and other trees, as well as on bushes lower to the ground. Matings occur in spring months, particularly in May, after which females lay eggs (typically pale green and numbering between 25-70 per clutch) as late as July on the underside of leaves and then guard them until they hatch, with the mothers then dying in August. Sub-adults overwinter on trees and then finish developing in the early spring. Both females and males use both visual and vibratory signals in identifying and communicating with one-another, both in challenges and during mating behavior. Pheromones also play a role in identification.

L. viridis subsists primarily on other species inhabiting plants, including mites, aphids, ants, and occasionally other spiders. Because of its relatively short jump distance, compared to other salticids, L. viridis often ambushes its prey, lunging from short distances. Also atypical of salticids, the nests of females are broad and sheetlike and may assist in predation by temporarily immobilizing prey.

== Range ==
Specimens of L. viridis have been commonly observed in most Southeastern states of the U.S., including Texas, Louisiana, Alabama, Mississippi, Tennessee, Arkansas, Florida, Georgia, South Carolina, North Carolina, Virginia, Maryland and the District of Columbia. Rarer sightings have been made as far west as Colorado. The species is particularly populous in Florida, where they are often observed in citrus orchards.

== Gallery ==
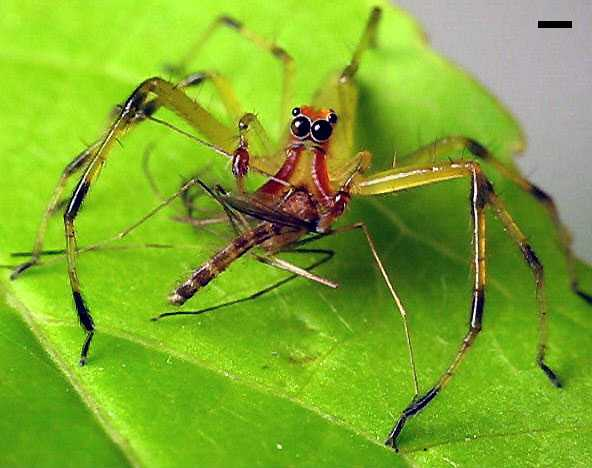
Mature male feeding on a nematoceran

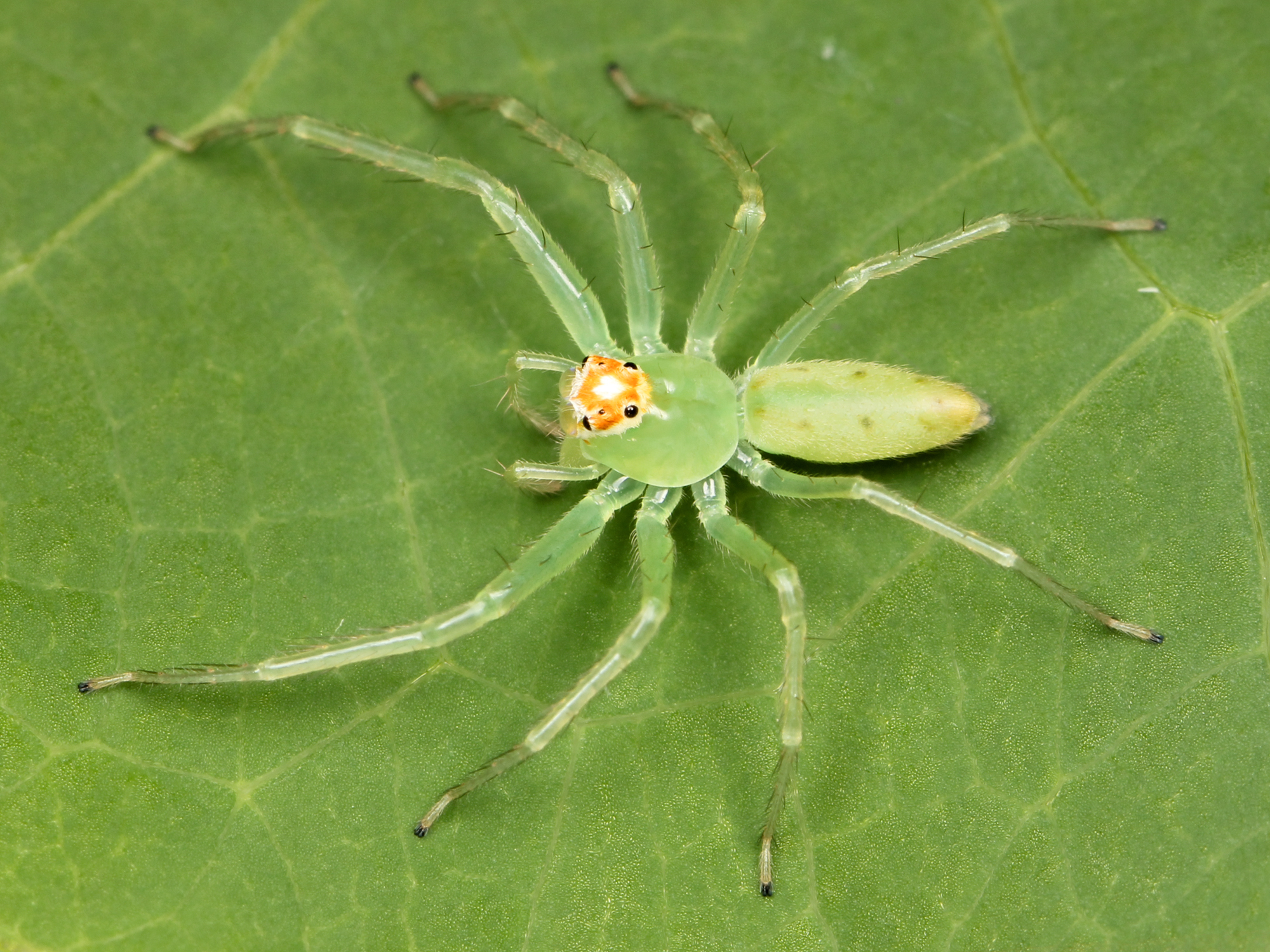
Mature female specimen, pictured in Greenville County, South Carolina

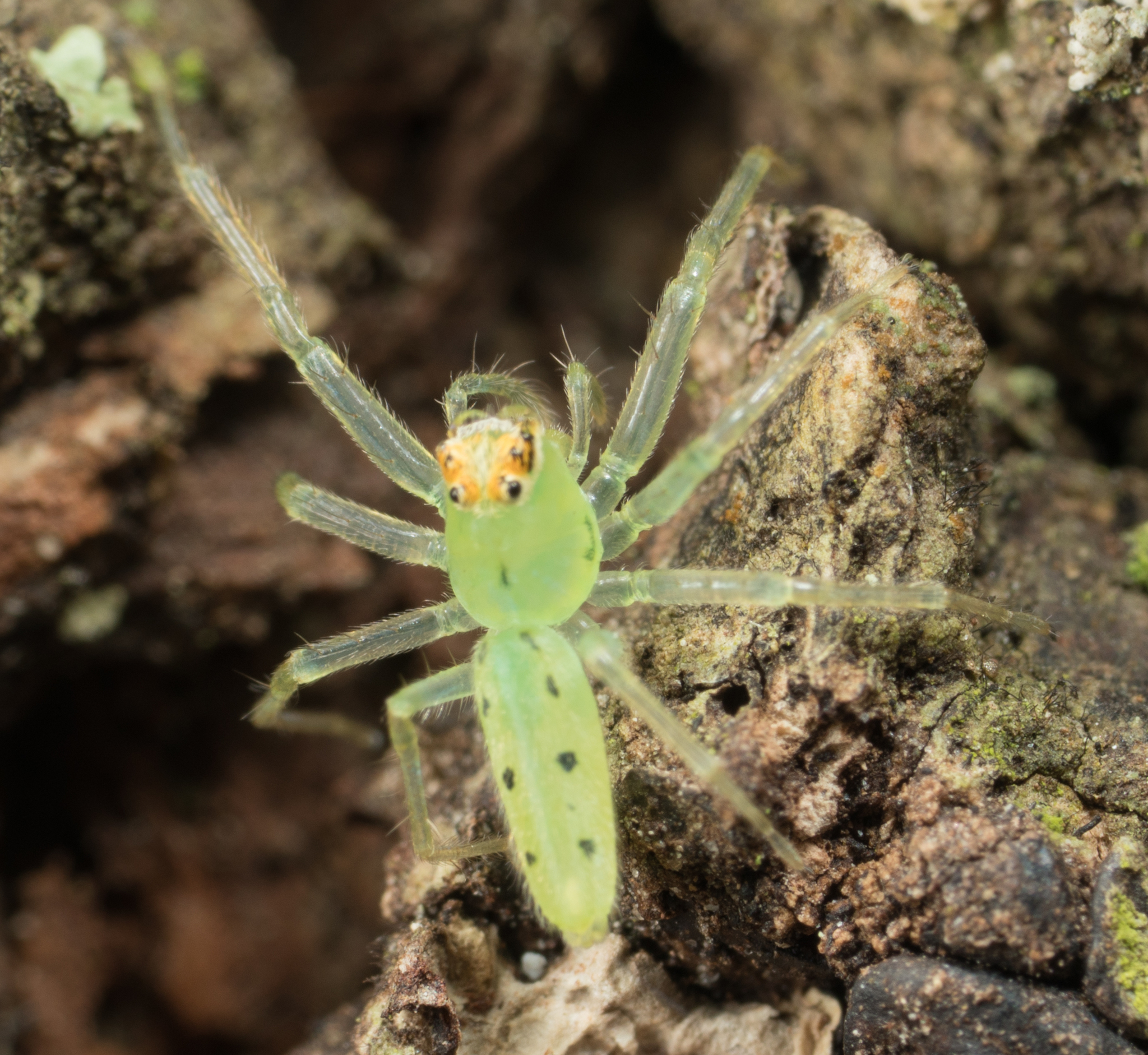
An immature specimen
