= Erica eugenia =

Scientific classification
- Kingdom: Animalia
- Phylum: Arthropoda
- Subphylum: Chelicerata
- Class: Arachnida
- Order: Araneae
- Infraorder: Araneomorphae
- Family: Salticidae
- Subfamily: Salticinae
- Genus: Erica; Peckham & Peckham, 1892
- Species: E. eugenia

Binomial name
- Erica eugenia Peckham & Peckham, 1892

Synonyms
- Apatita Mello-Leitão, 1933

Genus of spiders

Erica eugenia is a species of jumping spider. It is the only species in the monotypic genus Erica. It was first described by George and Elizabeth Peckham in 1892,.

E. eugenia resembles the related genus Fluda, with which its range overlaps in Panama and Brazil, but can be distinguished by its higher cephalothorax with the cephalic region slightly inclined forward. It is a myrmecomorph, mimicking the ant genus Crematogaster and residing near their nests.

== Distribution ==
This species has been found in Panama, Peru, Bolivia, Brazil, and Argentina.
