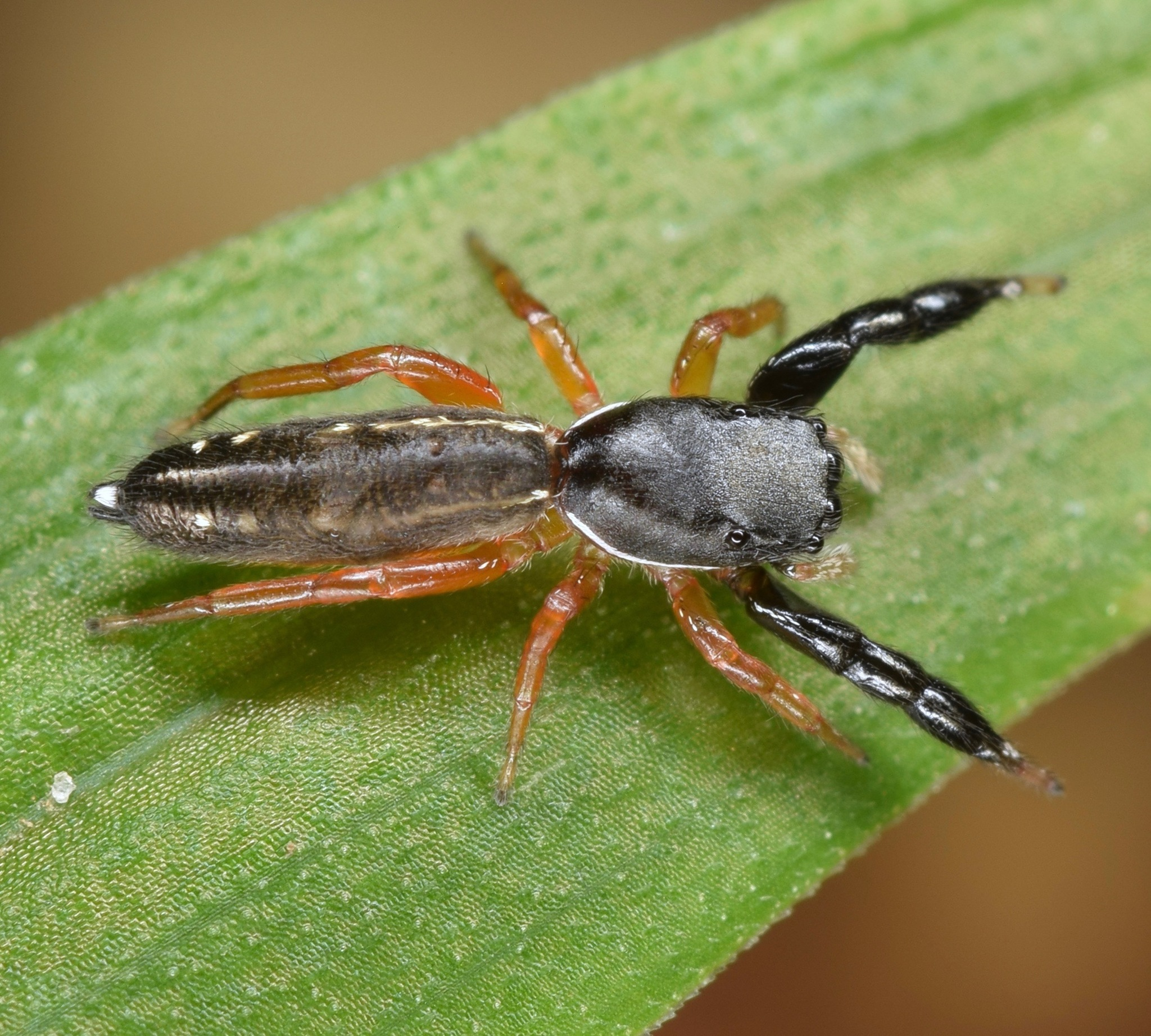
- Metacyrba floridana in Canton, Georgia

Scientific classification
- Kingdom: Animalia
- Phylum: Arthropoda
- Subphylum: Chelicerata
- Class: Arachnida
- Order: Araneae
- Infraorder: Araneomorphae
- Family: Salticidae
- Genus: Metacyrba
- Species: M. floridana

Binomial name
- Metacyrba floridana Gertsch, 1934

= Metacyrba floridana =

Species of spider

Metacyrba floridana is a species of spider in the family Salticidae, the jumping spiders. It is native to the United States and has been reported from the following states: Arizona, Arkansas, Florida, Georgia, Louisiana, Mississippi, and Texas.
