= Fluda =

Scientific classification
- Kingdom: Animalia
- Phylum: Arthropoda
- Subphylum: Chelicerata
- Class: Arachnida
- Order: Araneae
- Infraorder: Araneomorphae
- Family: Salticidae
- Subfamily: Salticinae
- Genus: Fluda; Peckham & Peckham, 1892

Type species
- F. narcissa Peckham & Peckham, 1892

Species
- 11, see text

Synonyms
- Keyserlingella Peckham & Peckham, 1892

Genus of spiders

Fluda is a genus of jumping spiders that was first described by George and Elizabeth Peckham in 1892.

== Species ==
As of June 2019 it contains eleven species, found only in South America, Panama, and on Trinidad:

- Fluda angulosa Simon, 1900 – Venezuela
- Fluda araguae Galiano, 1971 – Venezuela
- Fluda elata Galiano, 1986 – Ecuador
- Fluda goianiae Soares & Camargo, 1948 – Brazil
- Fluda inpae Galiano, 1971 – Brazil
- Fluda narcissa Peckham & Peckham, 1892 (type) – Brazil
- Fluda nigritarsis Simon, 1900 – Venezuela
- Fluda opica (Peckham & Peckham, 1892) – Brazil
- Fluda perdita (Peckham & Peckham, 1892) – Colombia, Trinidad, Guyana
- Fluda princeps Banks, 1929 – Panama
- Fluda ruficeps (Taczanowski, 1878) – Peru
