= Arthur M. Chickering =

American arachnologist (1887–1974)

Arthur Merton Chickering (March 23, 1887 - May 24, 1974) was an American arachnologist.

== Biography ==
He was born on March 23, 1887, in North Danville, Vermont.

He studied in Yale University under Alexander Petrunkevitch until 1913. In 1916 he earned a Master of Science degree in cytology and in 1927 a Ph.D. for cytological studies on the spermatogenesis of insects. He taught at Beloit College from 1913 to 1918 and at Albion College from 1918 to 1957. From 1953 to 1971 he was Research Associate in Arachnology at the Museum of Comparative Zoology at Harvard.

He went on numerous field trips to Central America from 1928 to 1964. His favorite collecting method was sifting plant litter. Because R. V. Chamberlin did not return some of his collections in 1928 but instead published on them, Chickering preferred to work on his collections himself later on.

He died on May 24, 1974, in Keene, New Hampshire.

== Legacy ==
From 1937 to 1972 he described 14 genera and 342 species, almost all of them from Central America, including the West Indies.
