= Goleba jocquei =

Scientific classification
- Kingdom: Animalia
- Phylum: Arthropoda
- Subphylum: Chelicerata
- Class: Arachnida
- Order: Araneae
- Infraorder: Araneomorphae
- Family: Salticidae
- Subfamily: Asemoneinae
- Genus: Goleba
- Species: G. jocquei

Binomial name
- Goleba jocquei Szűts, 2001

Species of jumping spider

Goleba jocquei is a species of jumping spider in the genus Goleba. The species is endemic to the Republic of the Congo. The female was first described by Tamás Szűts in 2001 and is the first of the pallens group to be found in Africa. It lives in forests, creating nests built of silk on leaves. The spider is medium-sized, typically 3.6 mm (0.14 in) long, and generally pale yellow, although there are two brown bands on its carapace, another brown band on its clypeus, and a dark brown background to the pale yellow pattern on its abdomen. The female has distinctive copulatory organs, including twice as many coils within its copulatory ducts than the related Goleba punctata. The male has not been identified.

== Taxonomy and etymology ==
Goleba jocquei is a species of jumping spider, a member of the family Salticidae, that was first described by Tamás Szűts In 2001. The species was allocated to the genus Goleba, which had been first circumscribed by Fred Wanless in 1980. Molecular analysis demonstrates that the genus is similar to Asemonea and Pandisus. In Wayne Maddison's 2015 study of spider phylogenetic classification, the genus was a member of the subfamily Asemoneinae. A year later, in 2016, Jerzy Prószyński placed it in the Asemoneines group of genera, The genus is split into two species groups that can be differentiated by their copulatory organs. Goleba jocquei is a member of the pallens group. Wanless described the genus name as "an arbitrary combination of letters". The specific name recalls Rudy Jocqué, curator of the Royal Central Africa Museum in Tervuren.

== Description ==
Goleba spiders are medium-sized, with males and females similar in size. Goleba jocquei has a typical total length of 3.6 mm (0.14 in). Its carapace, the upper side of its forward section, is typically 1.5 mm (0.059 in) long, 1.1 mm (0.043 in) wide and 0.8 mm (0.031 in) high. It is generally pale yellow with black edges and two brown bands on the back. The underside, or sternum is plain pale yellow. Its eyes are surrounded by black or white markings. Its clypeus has a dark rim and brown band, but is otherwise pale yellow. The mouthparts, including the chelicerae, labium and maxillae, are also pale yellow. There are seven teeth at the rear and three to the front.

While the spider's rear section, or abdomen, is pale yellow underneath, in comparison, the topside is dark brown, although it too is marked with a pale yellow pattern. The pattern consists of a central marking and another shaped like a crown to the rear. It is typically 1.8 mm (0.071 in) long. The spider's legs are also pale yellow with black sections. The spider's copulatory organs are distinctive. The female's epigyne, the visible external part of its copulatory organs, has large globular spermathecae located near the edges at the back. It's copulatory ducts that are tightly coiled and shaped like a corkscrew. There are twice as many coils as the related Goleba punctata. Although the male has not been identified, it is expected to have a long whip-like embolus.

== Behaviour ==
Like other jumping spiders, member of the Goleba genus are diurnal hunters, using their powerful eyes to catch their prey. They hunt prey by lunging and will eat a wide range of different insects. They lay their egg sacs in nests made of silk webs that are typically ten times the length of the spider. The female will often stay near the eggs until they hatch.

== Distribution and habitat ==
The first species in the pallens group of Goleba spiders were found in Seychelles and Madagascar. Goleba jocquei is the first to be found on the African continent. It's holotype was discovered in the forests of Republic of the Congo in 1963. Other examples have also been found in the local area. The species in endemic to the country. Goleba spiders live on leaves, to which they attach webs that are used to catch insects as well as hold their eggs.
