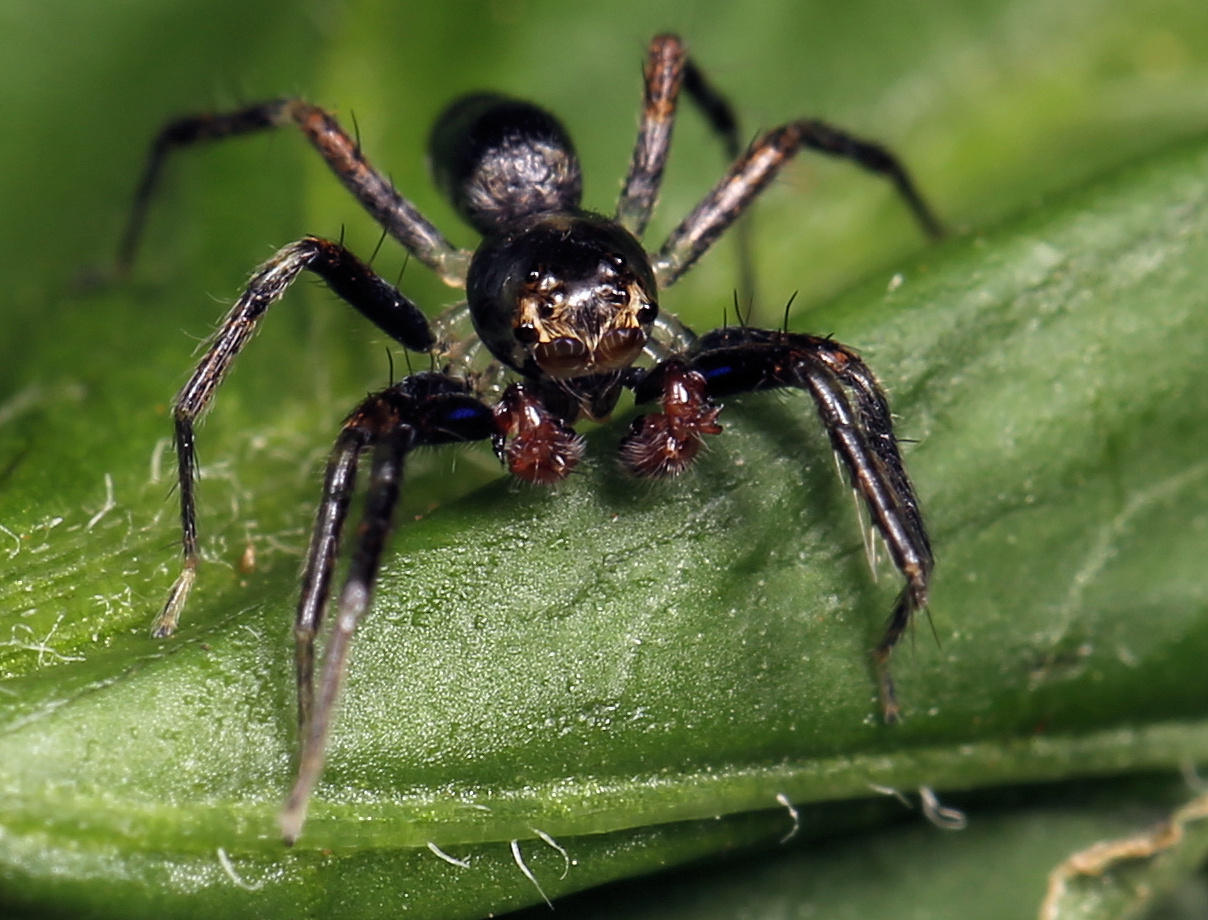
- A spider of the Asemonea genus

Scientific classification
- Kingdom: Animalia
- Phylum: Arthropoda
- Subphylum: Chelicerata
- Class: Arachnida
- Order: Araneae
- Infraorder: Araneomorphae
- Family: Salticidae
- Subfamily: Asemoneinae
- Genus: Asemonea
- Species: A. pinangensis

Binomial name
- Asemonea pinangensis Wanless, 1980

= Asemonea pinangensis =

Species of spider

Asemonea pinangensis is a species of jumping spider in the genus Asemonea that is endemic to Malaysia. The spider was first defined in 1980 by Fred Wanless. It is a small spider, with a carapace that is typically 1.16 mm (0.046 in) long and an abdomen typically 1.2 mm (0.047 in) long. The carapace is whitish-yellow with black markings and the abdomen black with whitish-yellow markings. The coloration, as well as the lip on its dorsal tibial apophysis, help distinguish the species from the otherwise similar Asemonea maculata, Asemonea minuta and Asemonea tanikawai. The female has not been described.

== Taxonomy ==
Asemonea pinangensis is a jumping spider that was first described by Fred Wanless in 1980. The species was allocated to the genus Asemonea, first raised by Octavius Pickard-Cambridge in 1869. It is related to Lyssomanes. Molecular analysis demonstrates that the genus is similar to Goleba and Pandisus. In Wayne Maddison's 2015 study of spider phylogenetic classification, the genus Asemonea was the type genus for the subfamily Asemoneinae, split from Lyssomaninae. A year later, in 2016, Jerzy Prószyński named it as the type genus for the Asemoneines group of genera, which was also named after the genus.

== Description ==
The spider is small, with a typical total length of 2.36 mm (0.093 in). The male has a carapace that is typically 1.16 mm (0.046 in) long and 0.92 mm (0.036 in) wide. It is generally whitish-yellow with heavy black markings but appears iridescent green when lit. The eye field is black, as is the clypeus, but this has a yellow band. The chelicerae is a shiny whitish yellow with light bluish-grey markings. The labium and sternum are also shiny whitish yellow. The abdomen is black and covered with grey-black hairs, typically 1.2 mm (0.047 in) long. It has a pattern on its back consisting of whitish-yellow patches. The spinnerets are also black with grey-black hairs. The spider has long thin pale yellow legs that also have blackish markings. The legs have pale spines. The pedipalp is also pale yellow with black markings and a distinctive apophysis, or appendage, on its femur. The dorsal tibial apophysis also has a characteristic lip. The female has not been described.

The species is similar to Asemonea minuta but can be distinguished by its coloration, the shape of the appendage on its palpal femora and the lip on its dorsal tibial apophysis. The spider resembles both Asemonea maculata and Asemonea tanikawai but likewise differs in the form of its dorsal tibial apophysis and femoral apophysis.

== Behaviour ==
Asemonea spiders rarely jump. Instead, they generally walk and run. They spin sheet webs on the underside of leaves, where they also lay their eggs. Although predominantly a diurnal hunter, the spider is also likely to eat nectar.

== Distribution and habitat ==
Asemonea pinangensis is endemic to Malaysia. The holotype was found in Pinang Island in 1979 in vegetation along the road near Teluk Bahang.
