= Goleba lyra =

Scientific classification
- Kingdom: Animalia
- Phylum: Arthropoda
- Subphylum: Chelicerata
- Class: Arachnida
- Order: Araneae
- Infraorder: Araneomorphae
- Family: Salticidae
- Subfamily: Asemoneinae
- Genus: Goleba
- Species: G. lyra

Binomial name
- Goleba lyra Maddison & Zhang, 2006

Species of jumping spider

Goleba lyra, is a jumping spider that lives in the dry forest of Madagascar. The spider is medium-sized with a total body that measures between 5.3 and 6.4 mm (0.21 and 0.25 in) in length. As well as being generally larger than the males, the females are paler. The spider is mainly pale yellow with the male having a marking of yellow-brown bands on the back of its carapace, the upper side of its forward section. Its legs are amber. The spider has distinctive copulatory organs that help distinguish the species from others in the genus. The female has long copulatory ducts, longer than others in the genus, that lead to multi-chambered spermathecae, or receptacles. The spider is most easily distinguished from others in the genus by the male's appendage on its palpal tibia, or tibial apophysis. This is curved and contains a set of thin hairs or setae. This combination looks like a harp or lyre. It is this feature that gives the spider its name.

== Taxonomy and etymology ==
Goleba lyra is a species of jumping spider, a member of the family Salticidae, that was first described by the arachnologists Wayne Maddison and Jiu Xia Zhang in 2006. They assigned it to the genus Goleba, which had been first circumscribed by Fred Wanless in 1980. The genus was a member of the subfamily Lyssomaninae. Molecular analysis demonstrates that the genus is similar to Asemonea and Pandisus. In Maddison's 2015 study of spider phylogenetic classification, the genus was a member of the subfamily Asemoneinae. A year later, in 2016, Jerzy Prószyński placed the genus Goleba in the Asemoneines group of genera.

Wanless described the genus name as "an arbitrary combination of letters". Maddison and Zhang named the species after the shape of the male spider's appendage on its palpal tibia, or tibial apophysis, which is curved and contains a set of thin hairs or setae. This combination looks like a harp or lyre.

== Description ==
Goleba spiders are medium-sized, with males and females similar in size. The male Goleba lyra has a typical total length of between 5.3 and 5.6 mm (0.21 and 0.22 in). Its carapace, the upper side of its forward section, of the holotype is 2.3 mm (0.091 in) long and 1.7 mm (0.067 in) wide. It is pale yellow and marked with two yellow-brown bands on its back. Some of its eyes have black markings around them. There are orange scales on its edges and on the part of its frontal section known as its clypeus. The underside of its carapace, or sternum, is plain yellow, as are its chelicerae, which have three teeth to the front and the back. The remaining mouthparts, the labium and maxillae, are also pale yellow.

The rear section, or abdomen, of the male Goleba lyra is typically 3 mm (0.12 in) long and 1 mm (0.039 in) wide. It is a long oval that is pale yellow with a few orange scales visible on its back and long brown setae on its front edge. The spider's legs are amber. The spider's copulatory organs are distinctive. As well as its harp-like tibial apophysis, it has a curved cymbium that has a concave side that faces the palpal bulb. The bulbs is complex, with a bulgy tegulum and a relatively long thin embolus that projects from the side of its tegulum and forms a whip-like path towards the top of the bulb. The shape of the embolus helps distinguish the spider from the related Goleba puella, although the shape of the tibial apophysis and the way that the embolus arises from the middle of the tegulum are the easiest way to tell the species from others in the genus.

The female is larger than the male with a typical total length of between 6 and 6.4 mm (0.24 and 0.25 in). Its carapace is typically 2.3 mm (0.091 in) long, 1.9 mm (0.075 in) wide and 1.1 mm (0.043 in) high. It is paler than the male's and lacks both the orange scales and the orange-brown band of the other sex. There are white and orange scales on its eye field and white scales on its clypeus. Its abdomen is typically 3.7 mm (0.15 in) long and 2.1 mm (0.083 in) wide. Otherwise it is similar to the male.

The female's epigyne, the visible external part of its copulatory organs, is rounded with two copulatory openings near the edge of a septum that is found in its middle. There are two round sacs near the top of the openings. The openings lead via long insemination ducts to complex spermathecae, or receptacles. The first chamber of the spermathecae are kidney-shaped, the second more bulbous. Unlike others in the genus, this spider does not have gland-like tubules. It is the length of its copulatory ducts that most clearly distinguishes the spider from others in the genus.

== Distribution and habitat ==
Goleba spiders are found across Africa Goleba lyra lives in Madagascar. It was first found near Ranohira. It lives on sandy soil that is found underneath dry forests. Like other jumping spiders, member of the Goleba genus are diurnal hunters, using their powerful eyes to catch their prey. They hunt by lunging rather than jumping, although they will also eat nectar and flowers.
