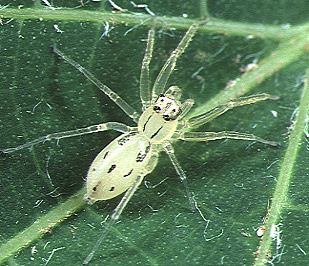
- A spider of the Asemonea genus

Scientific classification
- Kingdom: Animalia
- Phylum: Arthropoda
- Subphylum: Chelicerata
- Class: Arachnida
- Order: Araneae
- Infraorder: Araneomorphae
- Family: Salticidae
- Subfamily: Asemoneinae
- Genus: Asemonea
- Species: A. maculata

Binomial name
- Asemonea maculata Wanless, 1980

= Asemonea maculata =

Species of spider

Asemonea maculata is a species of jumping spider in the genus Asemonea that is endemic to Ivory Coast. The spider was first defined in 1980 by Fred Wanless. It is a small spider, with a carapace that is between 2.08 and 2.10 mm (1/16 and 1/16 in) long and an abdomen typically 2.4 mm (1/8 in) long. The carapace is amber to whitish-yellow and the abdomen whitish-yellow, both with black markings. It is similar to the related species Asemonea pinangensis and Asemonea tanikawai, but can be distinguished by the tibia on the male pedipalp. The female has not been described.

== Taxonomy ==
Asemonea maculata is a jumping spider that was first described by Fred Wanless in 1980. He allocated the species to the genus Asemonea, first raised by Octavius Pickard-Cambridge in 1869. The genus is related to Lyssomanes. Molecular analysis demonstrates that the genus is similar to Goleba and Pandisus. In Wayne Maddison's 2015 study of spider phylogenetic classification, the genus Asemonea was the type genus for the subfamily Asemoneinae, split from Lyssomaninae. A year later, in 2016, Jerzy Prószyński named it as the type genus for the Asemoneines group of genera, which was also named after the genus.

== Description ==
The spider is small, with a typical total length of between 4.56 and 4.7 mm (3/16 and 3/16 in). The male has a carapace that is between 2.08 and 2.10 mm (1/16 and 1/16 in) long and typically 1.8 mm (1/16 in) wide. It is generally pale amber in colour, tending towards a more whitish-yellow in the eye field. The majority of the eyes are surrounded by black markings. The clypeus is pale yellow with a dark band across it and a thin covering of white hairs. The chelicerae, labium and the remainder of the mouthparts are pale yellow. The sternum is a shiny whitish-yellow. The abdomen is whitish-yellow with black spots and slightly iridescent. It is typically 2.4 mm (1/8 in) long. The spinnerets are whitish-yellow, as are the legs, although these have black stripes and other dark markings. The pedipalp is distinctive, particularly the enlarged tibia. The female has not been described.

The species is similar in colour to Asemonea murphyi, particularly in the spots and bars on its abdomen. The spider also resembles both Asemonea pinangensis and Asemonea tanikawai but differs in the form of its pedipalp.

== Behaviour ==
Asemonea spiders rarely jump. Instead, they generally walk and run. They spin sheet webs on the underside of leaves, where they also lay their eggs. Although predominantly a diurnal hunter, the spider is also likely to eat nectar if it is available.

== Distribution and habitat ==
Asemonea maculata is endemic to Ivory Coast. The holotype was found near the Bandama River in vegetation.
