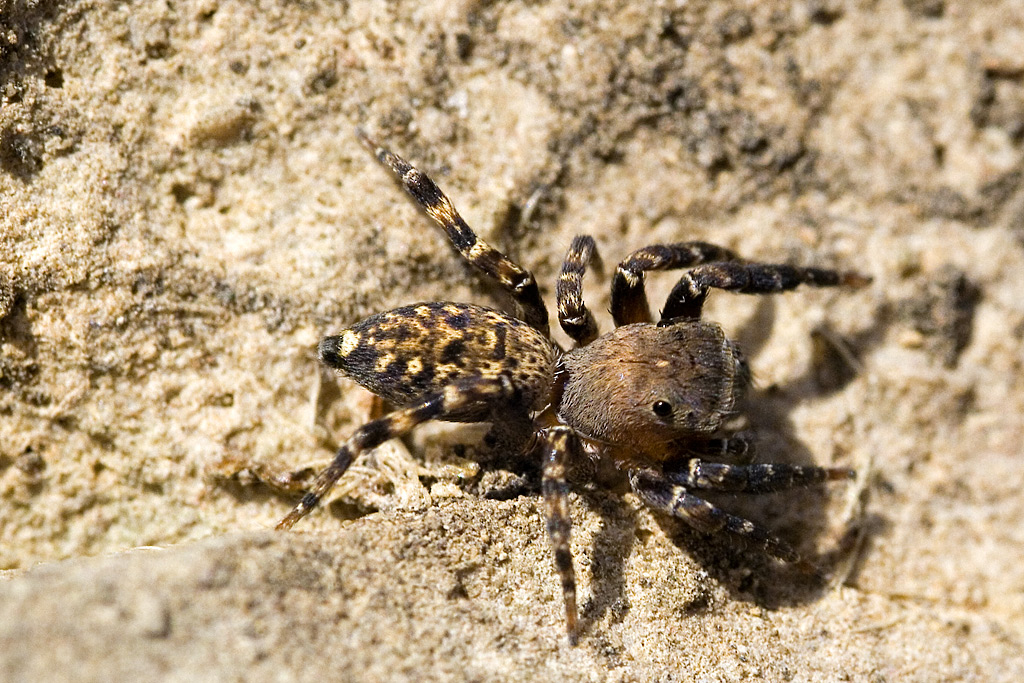
- Cyrba algerina
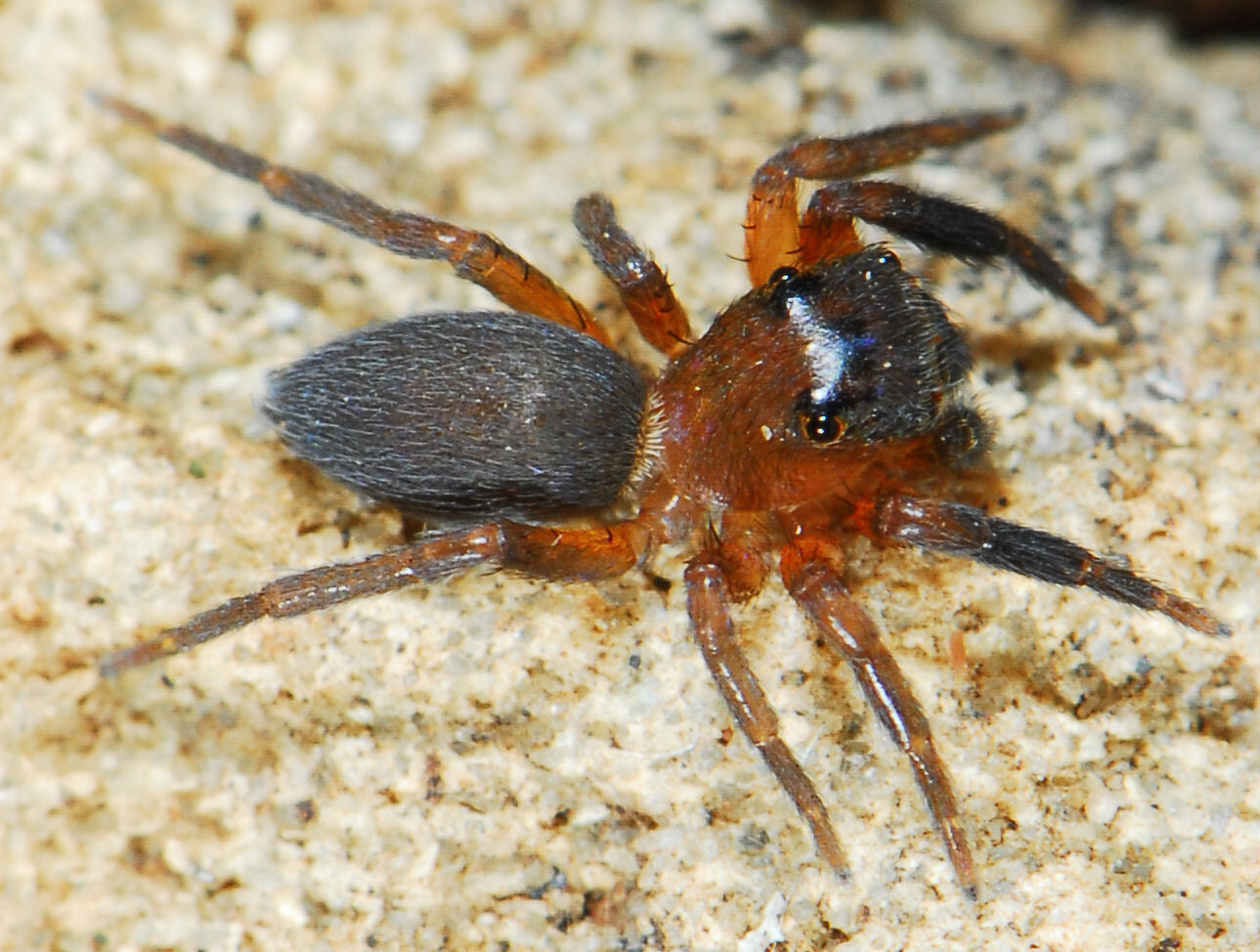
- C. nigrimana

Scientific classification
- Kingdom: Animalia
- Phylum: Arthropoda
- Subphylum: Chelicerata
- Class: Arachnida
- Order: Araneae
- Infraorder: Araneomorphae
- Family: Salticidae
- Subfamily: Spartaeinae
- Genus: Cyrba; Simon, 1876

Type species
- Salticus algerinus Lucas, 1846

Species
- See text.

= Cyrba =

Genus of spiders

Cyrba is a genus of spiders in the family Salticidae (jumping spiders). The genus was erected by Hippolyte Lucas in 1846.

== Description ==
Cyrba spiders are small to medium size spiders that are usually brightly colored. Their cephalothorax is long and moderately high. The eyes are lateral. The abdomen is long with bright colorful patterns. Their legs are thin and slender. The genus has been described as primitive because of their pervasive use of webs, large posterior median eyes, and the secretory organs on the femora of males. These characteristics were lost by advanced salticids. The genus are also almost wholly dependent on their vision. The primary mating season for the spider C. algerina is May. Juveniles emerge in July, grow to about half the adult size by winter, and then grow to adult size in the spring of the following year. The genus is commonly found on very rocky ground under rocks, or less often walking around on the ground or on the tops of rocks.

== Silk and eggs ==
The spider spins silk on which to moult. Cyrba makes an egg sac by spinning a thick silk sheet on the side of a rock, and then ovipositing the eggs in the center, covering them with another layer of silk. The egg sacs have clusters of white spots. Cyrba spiders generally stay with their eggs until they hatch. In a laboratory, they do not spin silk for moulting or resting.

== Diet ==
Spiders in this genus feed on other spiders, and prefer them to insects. They also feed on any insect that is caught in their silk. In a laboratory test to see if Cyrba spiders would attack other salticids, they did not. The spider C. algerina is the only spider in the genus that is known to hunt at night.

== Species ==
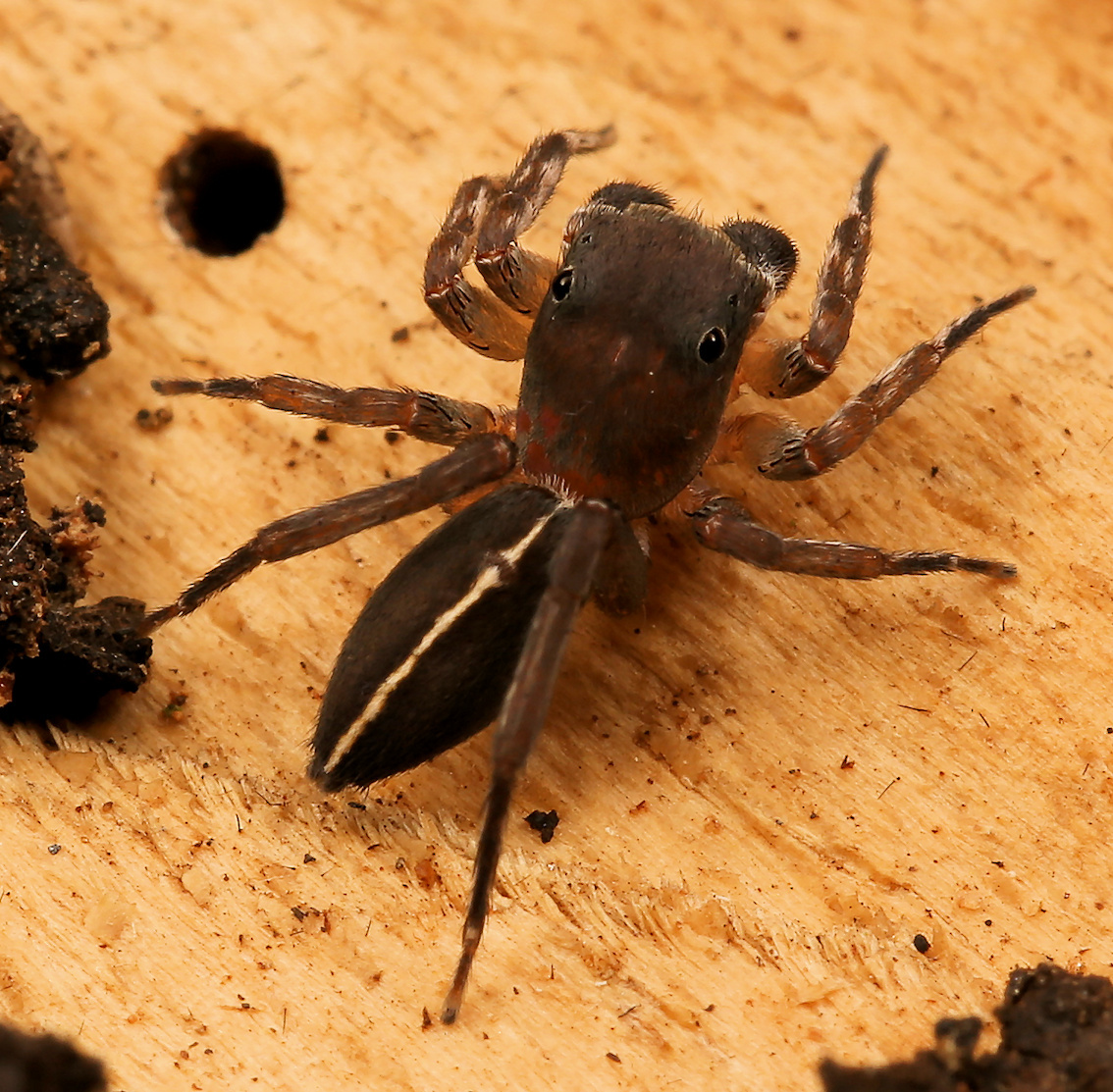
C. lineata

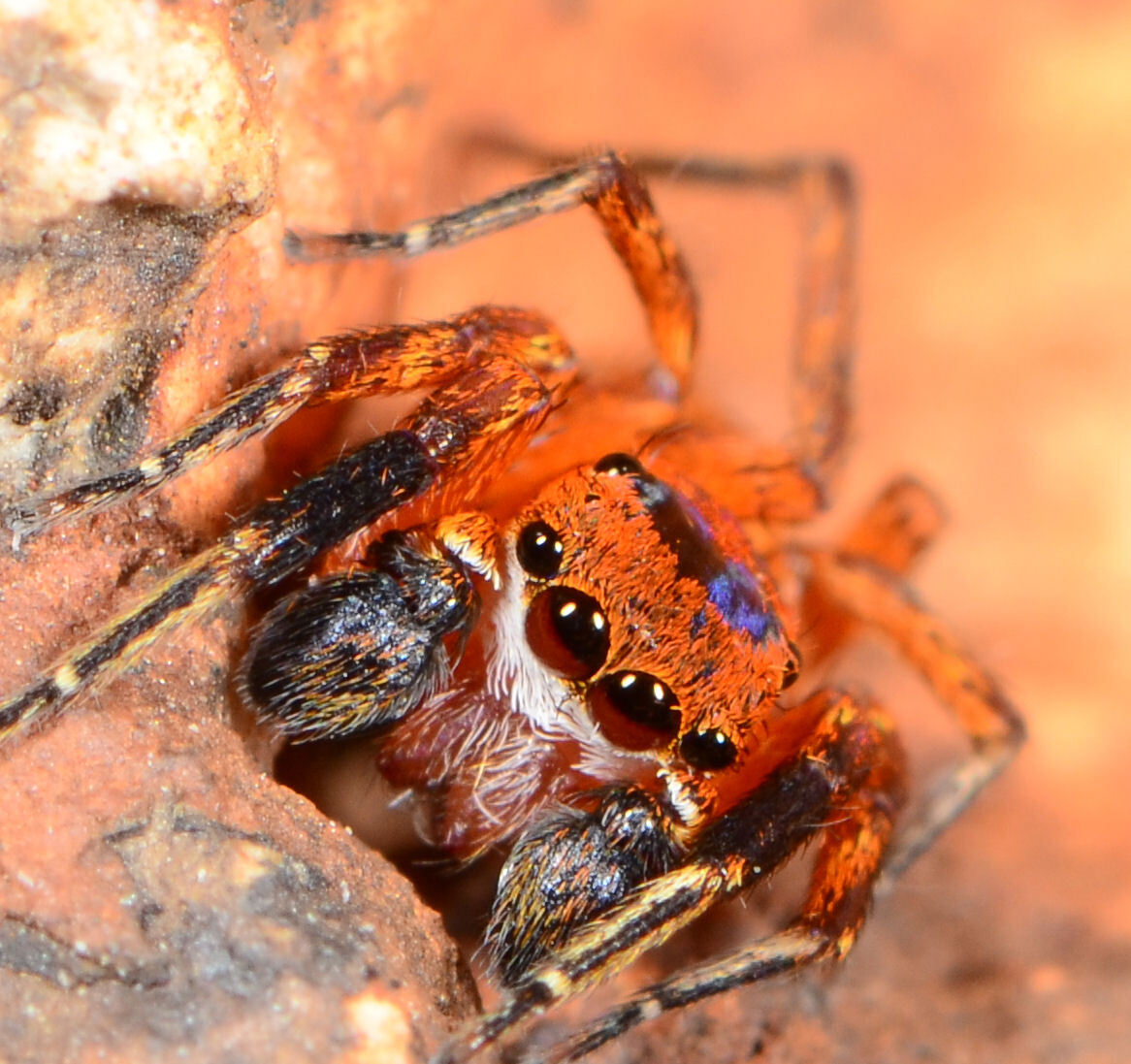
C. boveyi

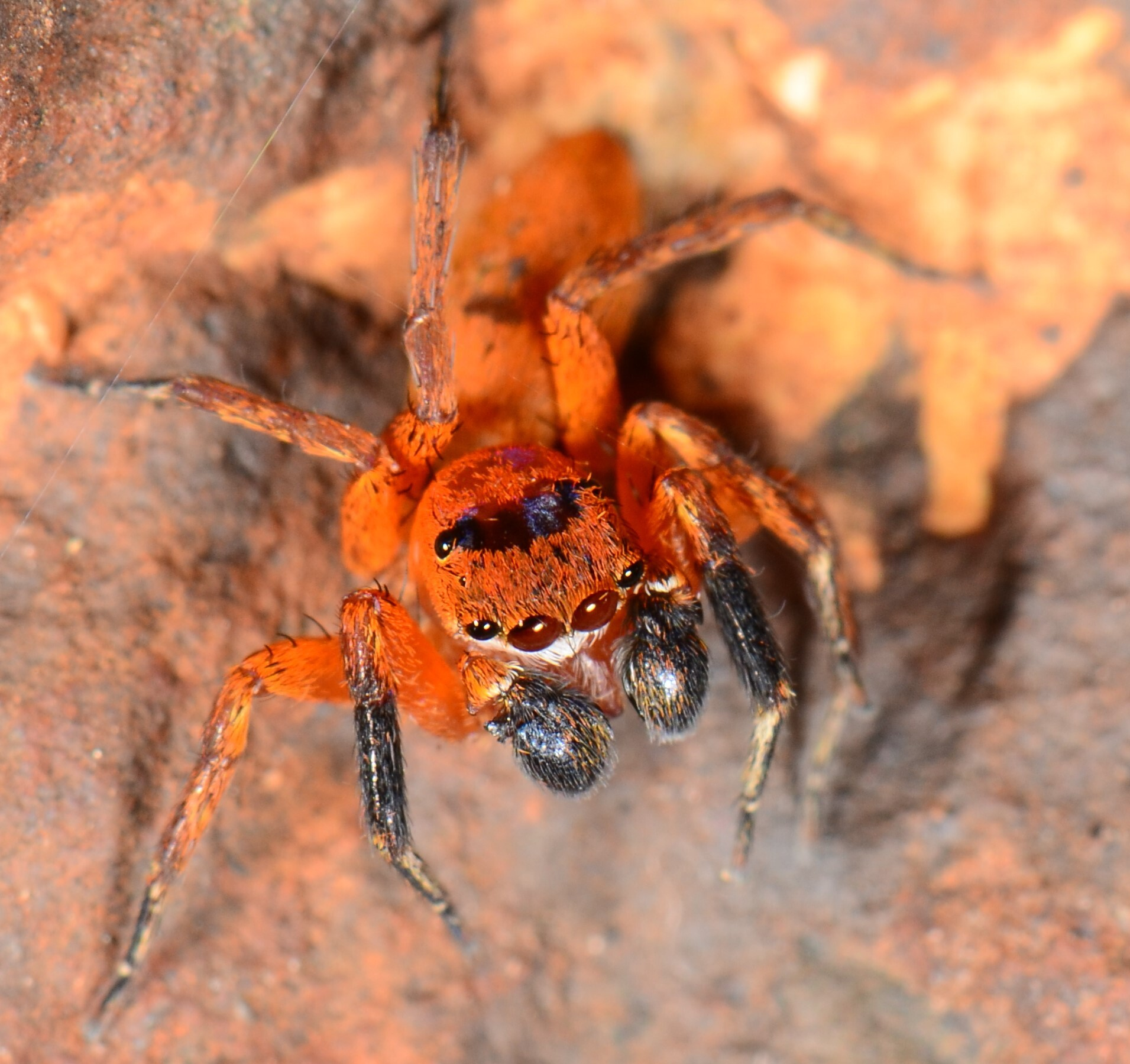
C. nigrimana

As of October 2025, this genus includes nine species:

- Cyrba algerina (Lucas, 1846) – Canary Is. to Central Asia (type species)
- Cyrba boveyi Lessert, 1933 – Kenya, Angola, Namibia, Mozambique, South Africa
- Cyrba dotata G. W. Peckham & E. G. Peckham, 1903 – South Africa
- Cyrba legendrei Wanless, 1984 – Madagascar, Comoros, Mayotte
- Cyrba lineata Wanless, 1984 – South Africa, Eswatini
- Cyrba nigrimana Simon, 1900 – Tanzania, Mozambique, South Africa
- Cyrba ocellata (Kroneberg, 1875) – Eastern Africa to India and Indonesia, Caucasus to Central Asia and China. Introduced to Australia (Queensland)
- Cyrba simoni Wijesinghe, 1993 – Nigeria, Cameroon, DR Congo, Uganda, Kenya, Burundi, Angola
- Cyrba szechenyii Karsch, 1898 – China
