= Jacksonoides jacksoni =

Scientific classification
- Kingdom: Animalia
- Phylum: Arthropoda
- Subphylum: Chelicerata
- Class: Arachnida
- Order: Araneae
- Infraorder: Araneomorphae
- Family: Salticidae
- Genus: Jacksonoides
- Species: J. jacksoni

Binomial name
- Jacksonoides jacksoni Żabka & Patoleta, 2011

Species of jumping spider

Jacksonoides jacksoni is a jumping spider species that lives in Queensland, Australia. A member of the genus Jacksonoides, the spider has a typical body length of between 5.32 and 6.49 mm (0.21 and 0.26 in), the male being generally larger than the female. The top of its front section, or cephalothorax, has a white stripe running down it but is otherwise generally brown while its abdomen, which can be found behind its cephalothorax, is generally grey, although it is marked by a pattern of lighter patches. The spider's underside is generally lighter than its topsides and it has prominent fangs, as well as one spur and two teeth, visible on the front of its chelicerae. The male has longer and more delicate legs than the female. The spider's copulatory organs distinguish it from others in the genus, particularly the female's wavy insemination ducts and the presence of two spikes, or apophyses, on the male's palpal tibia.

== Etymology and taxonomy ==
Jacksonoides jacksoni is a species of jumping spider, a member of the family Salticidae, that was first described by the arachnologists Marek Michał Żabka and Barbara Maria Patoleta in 2016. They allocated it to the genus Jacksonoides, which had been first cicumscribed by Fred Wanless in 1988. Both the genus and the species are named after Robert R. Jackson.

In 2015, in the phylogenetic classification study undertaken by the evolutionary biologist Wayne Maddison, the genus was identified as a member of the tribe Astiini. The tribe is very similar to one previously named Astieae by Wanless. It is a member of the clade Astioida in the clade Salticoida. Astioida is primarily found in Australasia. In 2017, the arachnologist Jerzy Prószyński added the genus to a group of genera named Astiaines. The holotype is stored in the Australian Museum in Sydney.

== Description ==
Jacksonoides jacksoni is a spider that has distinctive characteristics with a body that is divided into two main parts: a round forward section, known as its cephalothorax, and, behind that, a long thinner abdomen. The male has a cephalothorax that is typically 3.14 mm (0.12 in) long, 2.62 mm (0.10 in) wide, 2.03 mm (0.08 in) high and covered in whitish hairs. Its thorax is generally brown apart from a yellow stripe running down the middle. Jacksonoides spiders have a marked depression, or fovea in the middle of their cephalothorax. The spider's eye field is dark brown, with darker areas around its rearmost rows of eyes. The eyes in its front row are surrounded by light scales. There are also dark bristles that project over these eyes from its dark brown face, or clypeus, which is itself covered in short light hairs. The part of the underside of its cephalothorax known as is sternum is a dirty-brown. Its dark brown chelicerae, or jaws, are marked by their very long fangs and that there is one spur and two teeth visible on their front margin. At the rear, there are another nine teeth. The remainder of its mouthparts, Its labium and maxillae are also dark brown.

The male's abdomen measures typically 3.35 mm (0.13 in) long and 2.01 mm (0.08 in) wide. On top, it is grey with markings that consists of two irregular patches in the middle in a line that continues with three chevrons behind, which is accompanied with symmetrical pattern of three similar patches on each side. Underneath, it is grey in the middle with rows of lighter spots visible towards its sides. The spider has yellow spinnerets that are used to spin webs and long generally pale brown legs. Its front pair of legs are darker than the others and less delicate. It has similar leg spines to other spiders in the genus.

The male's spider's copulatory organs are at the end of its pedipalp. Its palpal tibia has a small curved spike that projects to the side, called a dorsal tibial apophysis, and another larger one nearer the end, called a retrolateral tibial apophysis. Attached to the top of the palpal tibia is the spider's cymbium, which is hairy and enfolds a smaller rounded palpal bulb that consists of a nearly-spherical tegulum and a relatively thin embolus, which is longer than that on the related Jacksonoides queenslandicus, Jacksonoides kochi and Jacksonoides subtilis, that projects from the top. The presence of two apophyses on the palpal tibia is also distinctive and helps to differentiate the species from others in the genus.

The female looks very similar to the male. It is slightly smaller, with a cephalothorax that is typically 2.3 mm (0.09 in) long, 1.99 mm (0.08 in) wide, 1.55 mm (0.06 in) high and an abdomen that is typically 3.02 mm (0.12 in) long and 1.74 mm (0.07 in) wide. It differs slightly in having more patches on the sides of its cephalothorax and a different pattern on its abdomen, which lacks the patches on the sides. Underneath, its sternum is paler and has narrow brownish edges and the underside of its abdomen is lighter towards the front and darker to the rear, with a marking of dark stripes running down its from the front to bak and rows of light spots situated toward the sides. Like the male, there are two teeth and one spur at the front of the spider's chelicerae but it differs in having eight teeth to the rear. Its legs are generally brownish with some segments darker than others. They are generally shorter and less delicate but its leg spines are similar to the male.

The female's epigyne, the external visible part of its copulatory organs, is long and has a central membranous region that is fringed by edges that shows mild levels of sclerotization. There is more evidence of sclerotization in its copulatory openings, which are located towards the front of its epigyne. The openings lead, via long wavy insemination ducts, to pear-shaped spermathecae, or receptacles, to which are attached the spider's accessory glands. It is the length and morphology of the spider's insemination ducts that most clearly differentiates the species from others in the genus.

== Distribution ==
Jacksonoides spiders are most commonly reported in the rainforests of coastal Queensland, Australia, with them being most commonly seen between Cooktown and on the Atherton Tableland. Jacksonoides jacksoni was first seen in a caravan park near Cooktown.
