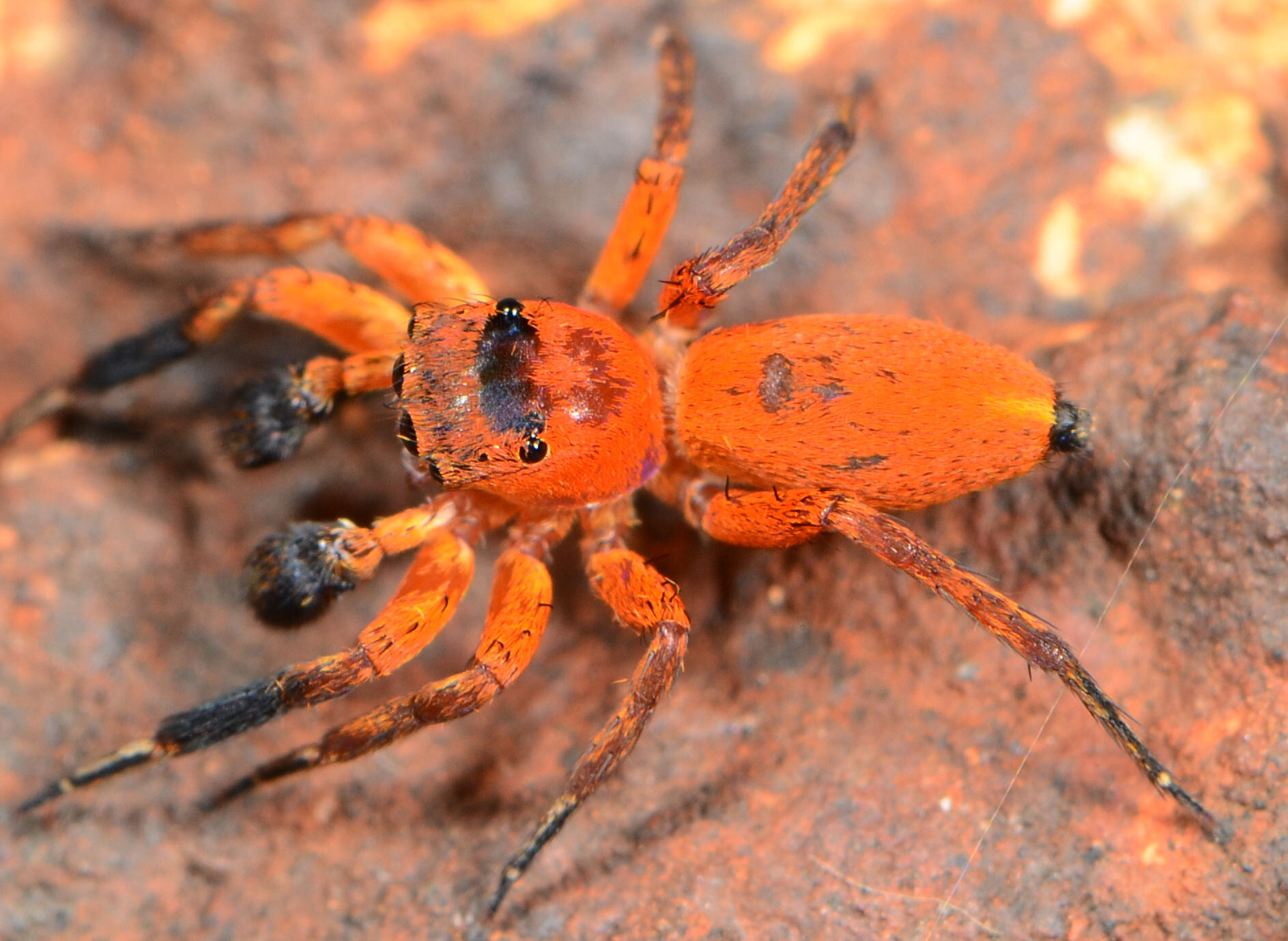
- male
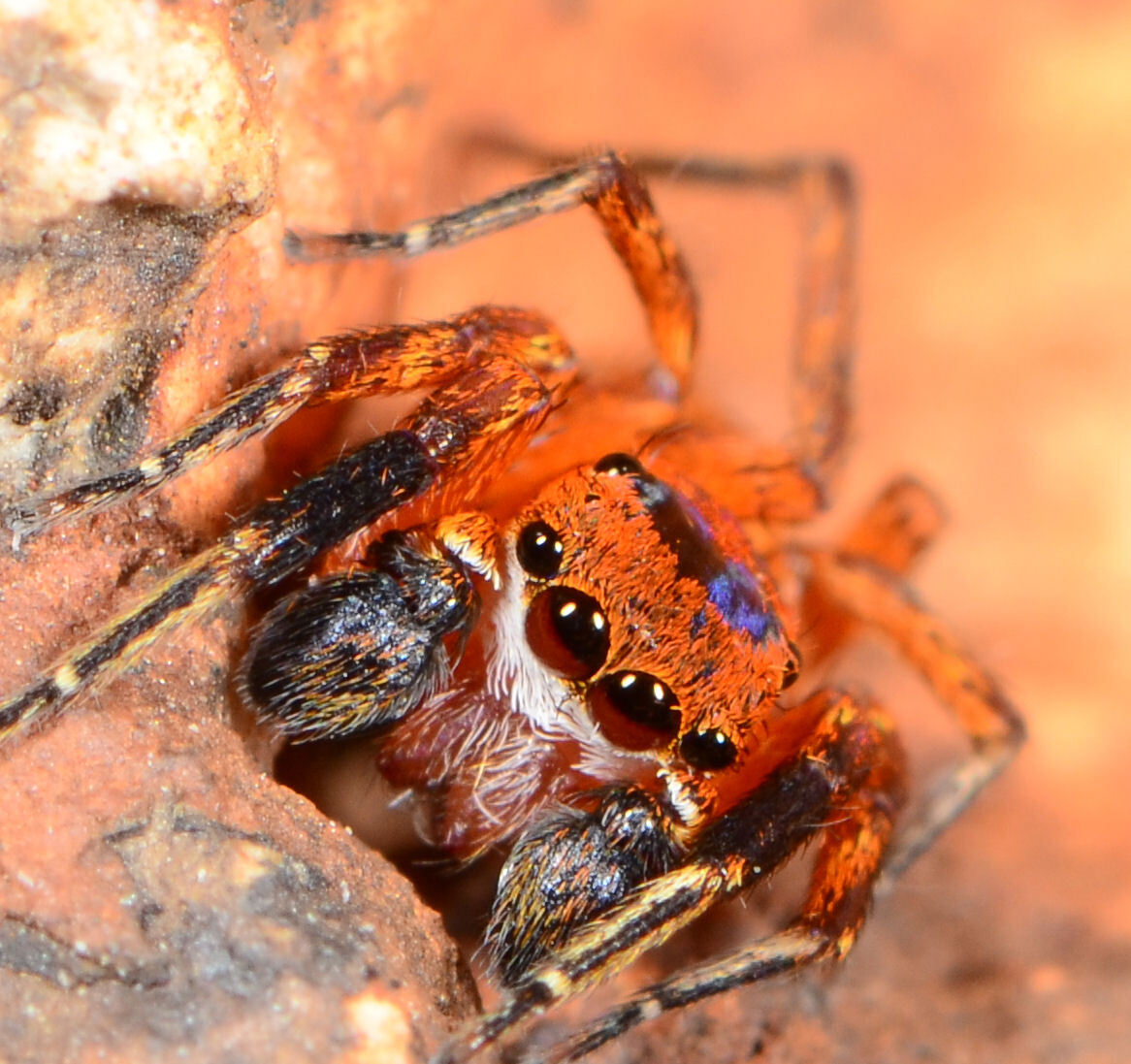
- male

Scientific classification
- Kingdom: Animalia
- Phylum: Arthropoda
- Subphylum: Chelicerata
- Class: Arachnida
- Order: Araneae
- Infraorder: Araneomorphae
- Family: Salticidae
- Genus: Cyrba
- Species: C. boveyi

Binomial name
- Cyrba boveyi Lessert, 1933

= Cyrba boveyi =

Bovey's Cyrba Jumping Spider

Species of spider

Cyrba boveyi is a species of spider in the family Salticidae. It is found in Africa and is commonly known as Bovey's Cyrba jumping spider.

== Distribution ==
Cyrba boveyi is found in Angola, Kenya, Mozambique, Namibia and South Africa.

In South Africa, it has been recorded from Free State Province, KwaZulu-Natal Province, Limpopo Province, Mpumalanga Province and North West Province.

== Habitat and ecology ==
This common ground-dwelling salticid is regularly found in silk retreats beneath logs and rocks, particularly in sunny areas. It is frequently found in the vicinity of colonies of large ants such as Camponotus and Streblognatha. Immature specimens were collected from the bark of Vachellia xanthophloea. Sampled from the Grassland and Savanna Biomes, at altitudes ranging from 47 to 1,558 m.

== Description ==
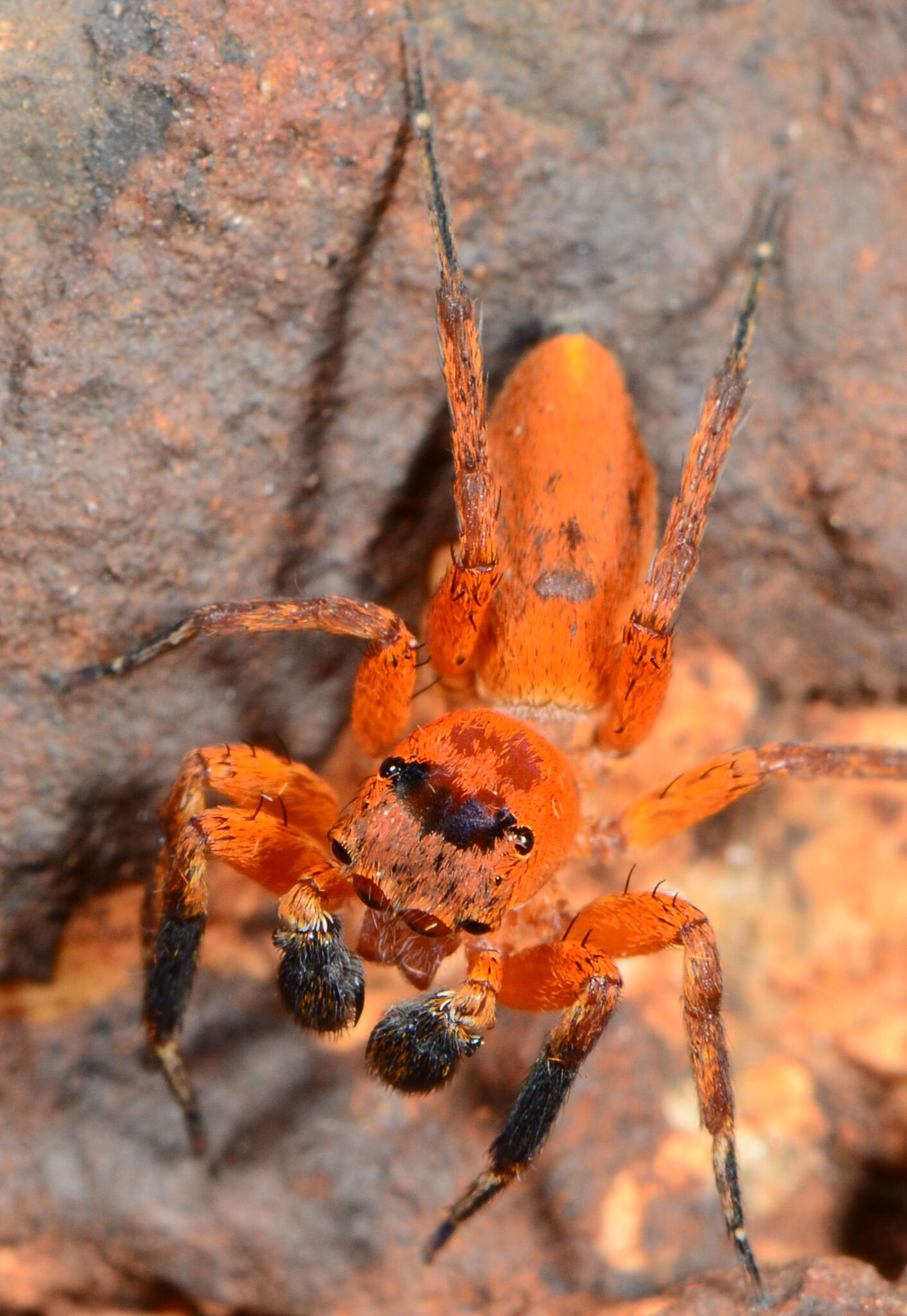
male

== Taxonomy ==
Cyrba boveyi was redescribed by Wanless in 1984 and by Wesołowska & Haddad in 2009.

== Conservation ==
Cyrba boveyi is listed as Least Concern due to its wide geographical range. In South Africa, it is protected in five protected areas including Kalkfontein Dam Nature Reserve, Ndumo Game Reserve, Tembe Elephant Park, Kruger National Park and Malebogo Nature Reserve. There are no known threats to the species.
