= Goleba pallens =

Scientific classification
- Kingdom: Animalia
- Phylum: Arthropoda
- Subphylum: Chelicerata
- Class: Arachnida
- Order: Araneae
- Infraorder: Araneomorphae
- Family: Salticidae
- Subfamily: Asemoneinae
- Genus: Goleba
- Species: G. pallens

Binomial name
- Goleba pallens (Blackwall, 1877)

Species of jumping spider

Goleba pallens is a species of jumping spiders that is endemic to the Seychelles. A member of the genus Goleba, Goleba pallens is a medium-sized spider that measures between 4.4 and 4.76 mm (0.173 and 0.187 in) in total length. It is generally whitish-yellow with a pale amber thorax. The male has an indistinct pattern of reddish-brown bands but otherwise the spider is generally patternless. The female's legs are simple and pale yellow while, in contrast, the male has legs that fade from light yellow to pale amber and have dark amber stripes on the front two pairs. They have many strong leg spines. The female's copulatory organs are distinctive, particularly its copulatory openings near the rear of its epigyne, the visible external part of its copulatory organs. The male has an embolus that is accompanied along much of its length by another appendage that shows clear signs of sclerotization. The spider was first described 1877. Initially placed in the genus Lyssomanes, the genus was moved to Asamonea by Eugène Simon in 1885 and was then to Goleba in 1980 by Fred Wanless.

== Taxonomy and etymology ==
Goleba pallens is a species of jumping spider, a member of the family Salticidae, that was first described by the arachnologist John Blackwall in 1877. He allocated it to the genus Lyssomanes, which had been first circumscribed by Nicholas Marcellus Hentz in 1845. In 1885, Eugène Simon moved the species to Asemonea, first circumscribed by Octavius Pickard-Cambridge in 1869, with the name Asemonea pallens.

When Fred Wanless circumscribed Goleba in 1980, he transferred the species to the new genus. Wanless described the generic name as "an arbitrary combination of letters". He allocated the species to the group pallens, which are distinguished by their copulatory organs. Molecular analysis demonstrates that the genus is similar to Asemonea and Pandisus. In Wayne Maddison's 2015 study of spider phylogenetic classification, the genus was a member of the subfamily Asemoneinae. A year later, in 2016, Jerzy Prószyński placed it in the Asemoneines group of genera,

== Description ==
Goleba spiders are medium-sized, with males and females similar in size. Goleba pallens has a typical total length of between 4.4 and 4.76 mm (0.173 and 0.187 in), the female being generally slightly longer than the male. Its pear-shaped and shiny carapace, the upper side of its forward section, is between 1.8 and 1.92 mm (0.071 and 0.076 in) long, between 1.4 and 1.48 mm (0.055 and 0.058 in) wide and 0.8 and 0.84 mm (0.031 and 0.033 in) high. It has a generally pale amber thorax, lighter to the front and whitish-yellow around the spider's eyes. Many of its eyes are surrounded by a black ring and have a fringe of silky white hairs. Similar hairs clothe the female's clypeus. The male's clypeus has a band of orange hairs on it. The underside, or sternum, of both is whitish-yellow. Its mouthparts, its chelicerae, labium and maxillae, are all pale yellow.

The spider's rear section, or abdomen, is lighter and narrower than its carapace, with the male shorter than the female, at typically 2.56 mm (0.101 in) compared to a typical length of 2.72 mm (0.107 in). The male is marked with faint reddish-brown bands across it that the female lacks. Otherwise, its abdomen is whitish-yellow. Both have pale yellow spinnerets, the outermost ones being longer the others. The female's legs are also pale yellow. In contrast, the male has legs that fade from light yellow to pale amber and have dark amber stripes on the front two pairs. They have many strong leg spines.

The spider's copulatory organs are distinctive. The female's epigyne, the visible external part of its copulatory organs, is rounded with two broad copulatory openings leading via winding insemination ducts to rounded spermathecae, or receptacles, and narrow accessory glands. The fact that the openings are towards the rear of the spider's epigyne distinguish the species from the otherwise similar Goleba punctata.

The male has a palpal tibia divides into two, with a wide blunt projection, or tibial apophysis, projecting upwards. There is another more pointed apophysis that projects into a valley in the spider's cymbium. The cymbium is rounded and finishes in a narrow point. Attached is the spider's palpal bulb. Its tegulum is complex and finishes in an embolus that projects from near the top of the palpal bulb and curves up, over and back down. Its embolus is accompanied along much of its length by another appendage that shows clear signs of sclerotization.

== Distribution ==
Goleba spiders are found across Africa. Goleba pallens is endemic to the Seychelles.
