= T. lepidus =

T. lepidus may refer to:

- Tauala lepidus, a spider species in the genus Tauala
- Timon lepidus, a lizard species
- Tinodon lepidus, an extinct mammal species in the genus Tinodon from the Late Jurassic
- Trachycephalus lepidus, a frog species

== See also ==
- Lepidus (disambiguation)
