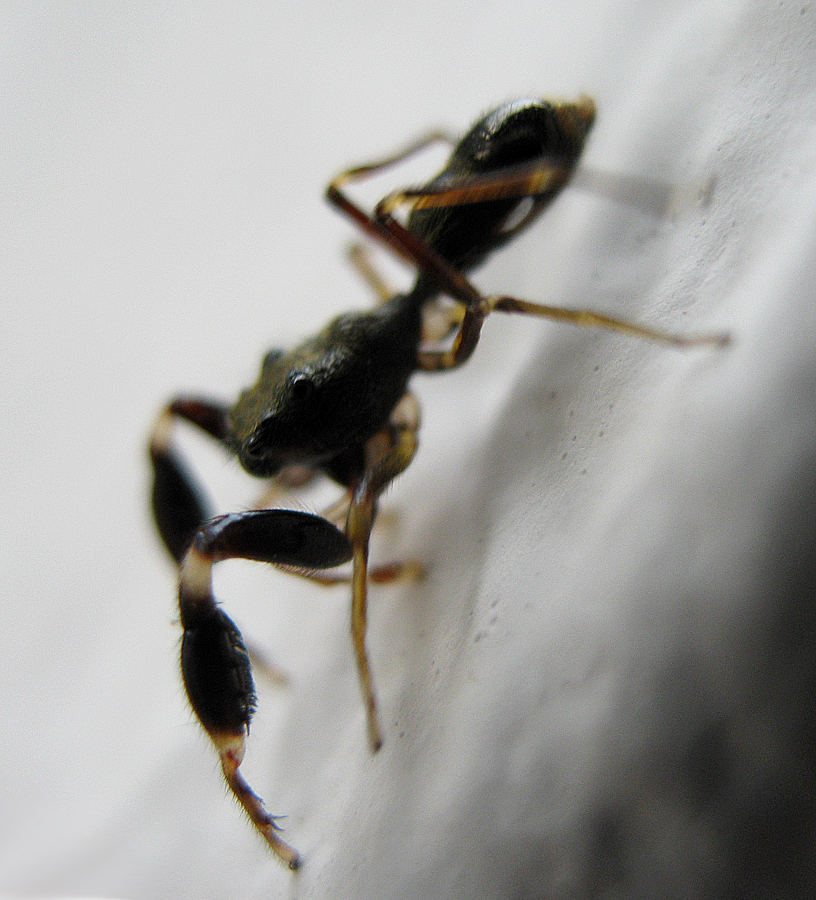

Scientific classification
- Kingdom: Animalia
- Phylum: Arthropoda
- Subphylum: Chelicerata
- Class: Arachnida
- Order: Araneae
- Infraorder: Araneomorphae
- Family: Salticidae
- Subfamily: Salticinae
- Genus: Leikung; Benjamin, 2004

Type species
- Marengo porosa Wanless, 1978

Species
- See text.

= Leikung =

Genus of spiders

Leikung is a spider genus of the jumping spider family, Salticidae.

== Species ==
- Leikung kinabaluensis Benjamin, 2004 – Malaysia, Borneo
- Leikung porosa (Wanless, 1978) – Malaysia, Sumatra
