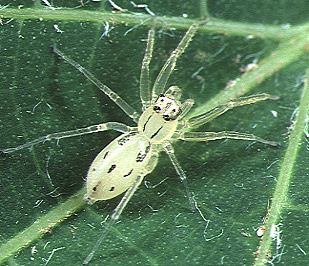
- Female Asemonea tanikawai from Okinawa
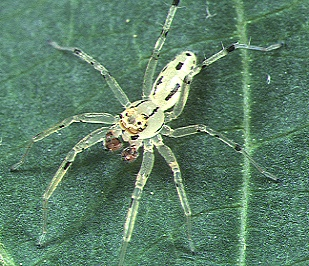
- Male Asemonea tanikawai from Okinawa

Scientific classification
- Kingdom: Animalia
- Phylum: Arthropoda
- Subphylum: Chelicerata
- Class: Arachnida
- Order: Araneae
- Infraorder: Araneomorphae
- Family: Salticidae
- Subfamily: Asemoneinae
- Genus: Asemonea
- Species: A. tanikawai

Binomial name
- Asemonea tanikawai Ikeda, 1996

= Asemonea tanikawai =

Species of spider

Asemonea tanikawai is a small species of jumping spider in the genus Asemonea that is endemic to Japan. It lives in trees in mountain ranges. The spider was first described in 1996 by Hiroyoshi Ikeda. It is whitish-yellow with a pattern of two brown stripes down the back of the carapace and nine black dots on the back of the abdomen. The spider has been found throughout Okinawa and the other Ryukyu Islands.

== Taxonomy ==
Asemonea tanikawai is a jumping spider that was first described by Hiroyoshi Ikeda in 1996. The species was allocated to the genus Asemonea, first raised by Octavius Pickard-Cambridge in 1869. The genus is related to Lyssomanes.

Molecular analysis demonstrates that the genus is similar to Goleba and Pandisus. In Wayne Maddison's 2015 study of spider phylogenetic classification, the genus Asemonea was the type genus for the subfamily Asemoneinae. A year later, in 2016, Jerzy Prószyński named it as the type genus for the Asemoneines group of genera, which was also named after the genus. The species is named in honour of Akio Tanikawa, who collected the first examples of the species to be identified.

== Description ==
The spider is small, with a body length that can vary between 2.8 and 4.8 mm (0.11 and 0.19 in). It has a [prosoma that varies in length between 1.31 and 1.60 mm (0.052 and 0.063 in) and in width between 0.99 and 1.28 mm (0.039 and 0.050 in).

The abdomen is between 1.84 and 2.24 mm (0.072 and 0.088 in) long and between 0.80 and 1.12 mm (0.031 and 0.044 in) wide. The spider is generally whitish-yellow. The carapace is covered in white hairs and marked with two brown stripes that stretch from the front to back. The sternum is similarly covered with white hairs. The eye field is black with an edge of white hairs. The clypeus is marked with black spots. The chelicerae, maxillae and remaining mouthparts are white.

The male has a distinctive pedipalp with a complex tibial apophysis and a furrow alongside the femoral apophysis, which distinguishes it from the otherwise similar Asemonea maculata and Asemonea pinangensis. The female is also similar, with its copulatory openings hidden in its epigyne.

The top of the male's abdomen has nine black spots and a covering of brown hairs, the underside a layer of white hairs. The male has whitish-yellow legs with black spots. It has a pedipalp with a complex apophysis, or appendage, on the tibia and a furrow alongside the apophysis on the femur. The embolus is long, curved and attached to the ovoid tegulum.

The female is similar in the size and colouring to the male. It differs in having white legs and a brown edge to the abdomen. The epigyne has hidden copulatory openings. The species resembles both Asemonea maculata and Asemonea pinangensis, particularly the female. The shape of apophyses on the dorsal tibia and femur on the male enable the species to be differentiated. It can also be distinguished from the similar Asemonea minuta by its coloration.

== Behaviour ==
Asemonea spiders rarely jump. Instead, they generally walk and run. They spin sheet webs on the underside of leaves, where they also lay their eggs. Although predominantly a diurnal hunter, the spider is also likely to eat nectar if it is available.

== Distribution ==
Asemonea tanikawai is endemic to Japan. The holotype was discovered in the south of Iriomote Island in 1986. The spider has been also seen on Okinawa Island. It has a range that extends across the entire Ryukyu Islands.
