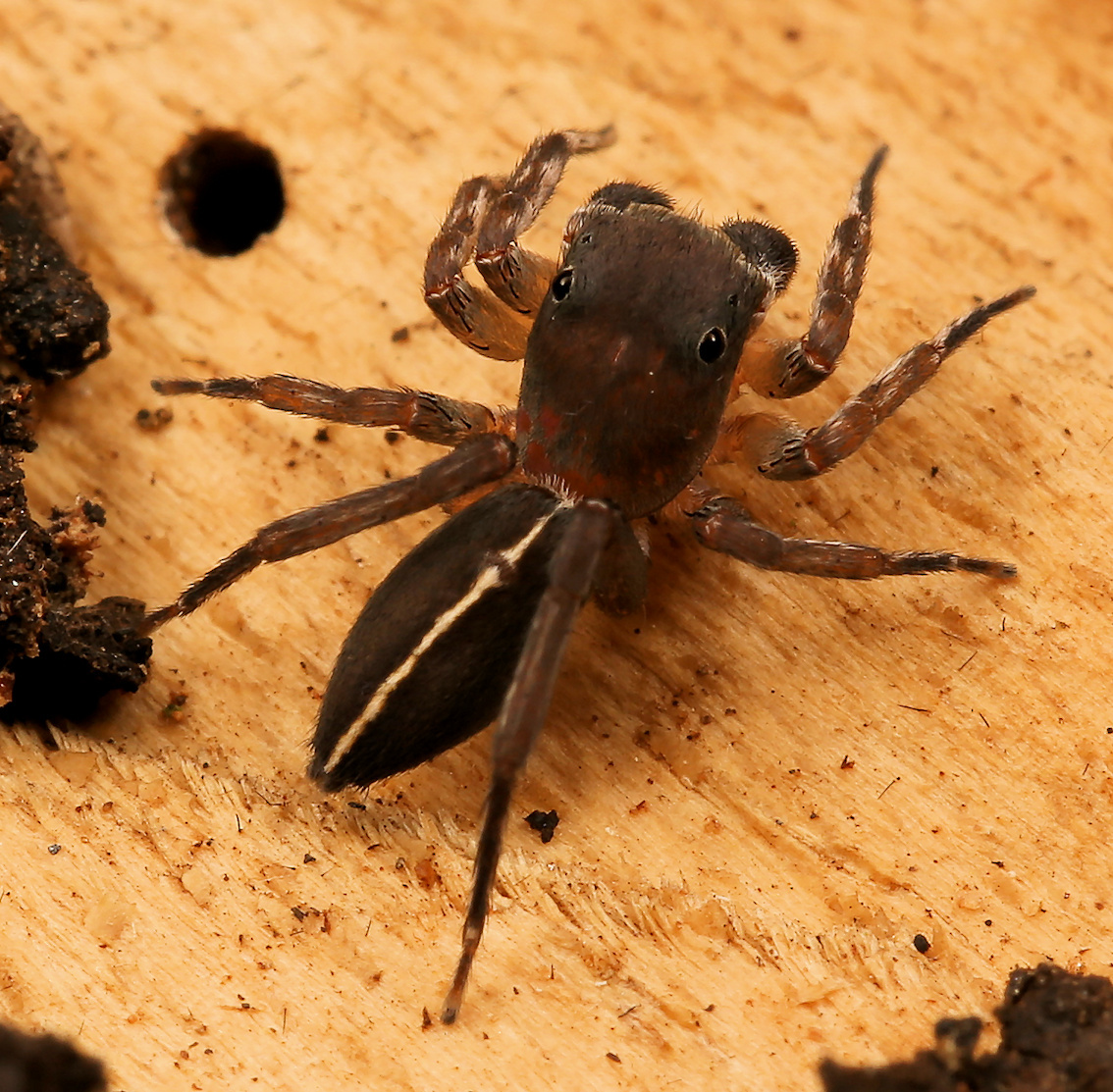
- male
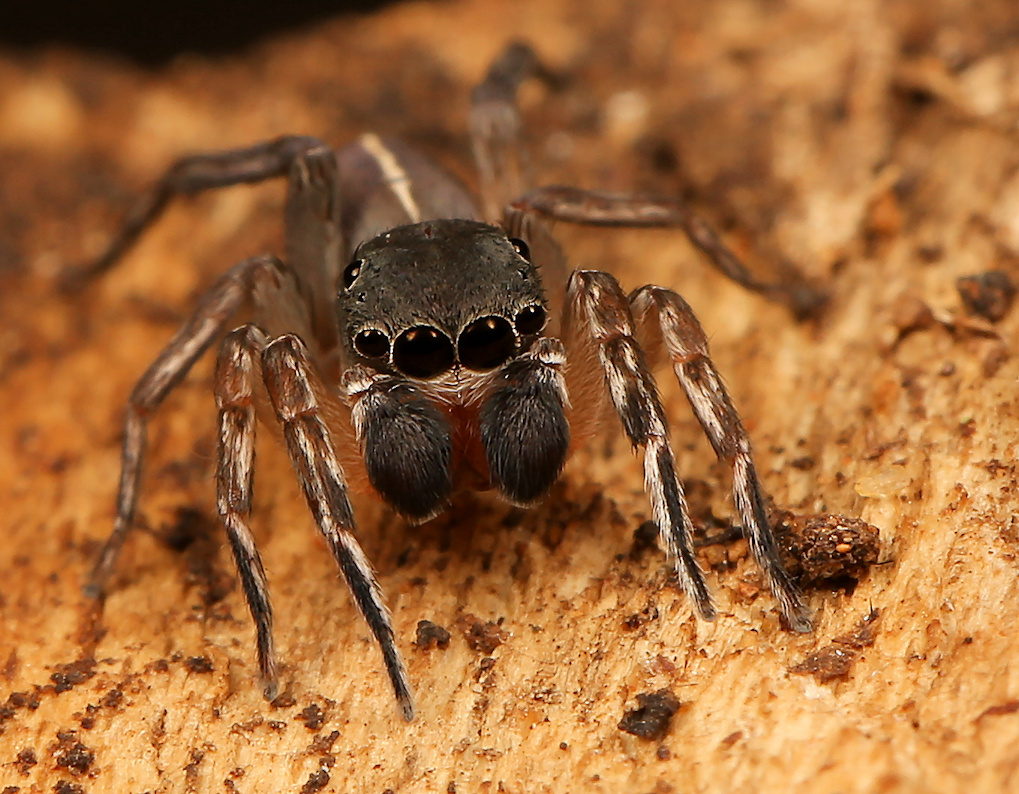
- male

Scientific classification
- Kingdom: Animalia
- Phylum: Arthropoda
- Subphylum: Chelicerata
- Class: Arachnida
- Order: Araneae
- Infraorder: Araneomorphae
- Family: Salticidae
- Genus: Cyrba
- Species: C. lineata

Binomial name
- Cyrba lineata Wanless, 1984

Synonyms
- Cyrba armata Wesołowska, 2006

= Cyrba lineata =

Striped Cyrba Jumping Spider

Species of spider

Cyrba lineata is a species of spider in the family Salticidae. It is found in southern Africa and is commonly known as the striped Cyrba jumping spider.

== Distribution ==
Cyrba lineata is found in South Africa and Eswatini. In South Africa, the species has been recorded from KwaZulu-Natal Province, Limpopo Province and Mpumalanga Province.

== Habitat and ecology ==
This is a ground-dwelling salticid at altitudes ranging from 5 to 1,146 m. It is commonly found under logs and rocks and in leaf litter. The species was sampled from the Forest, Grassland and Savanna Biomes.

== Description ==
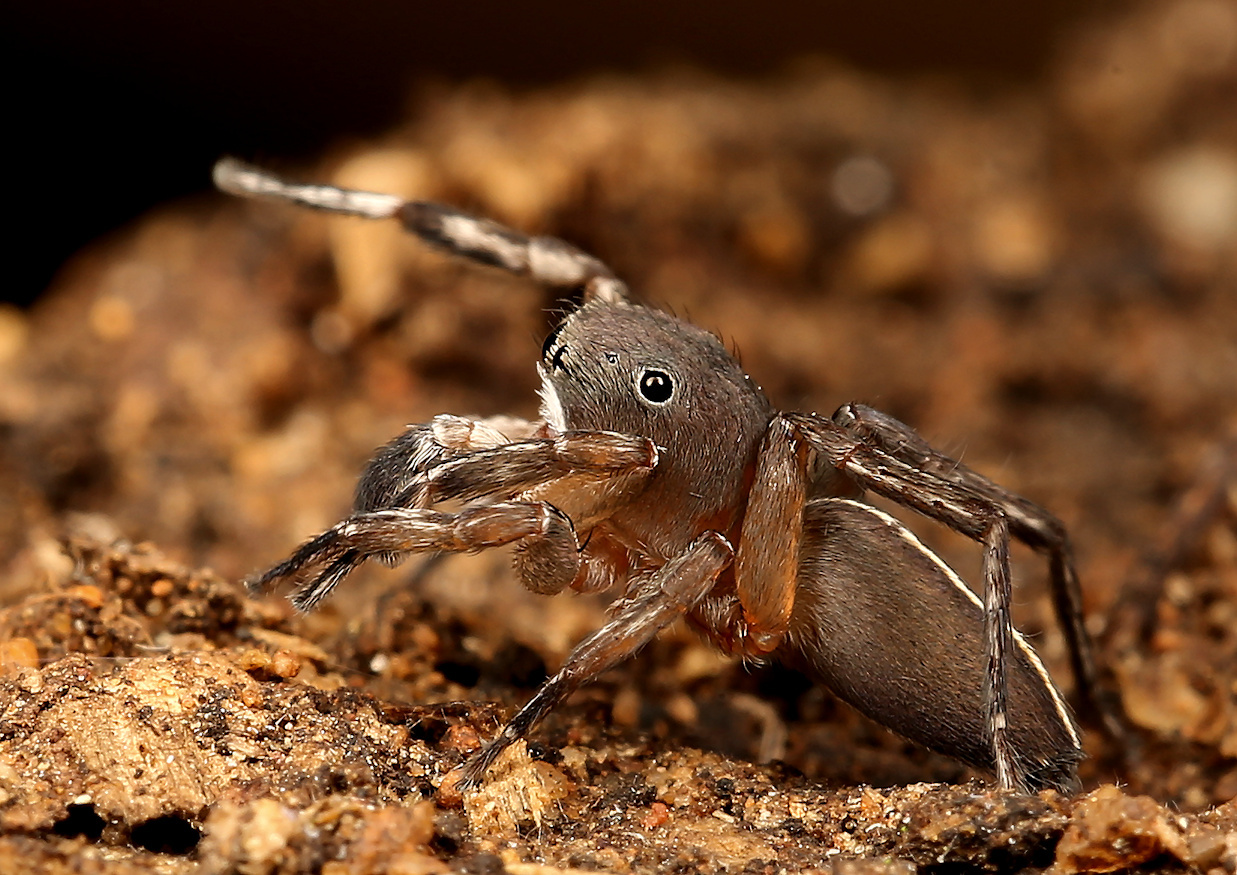

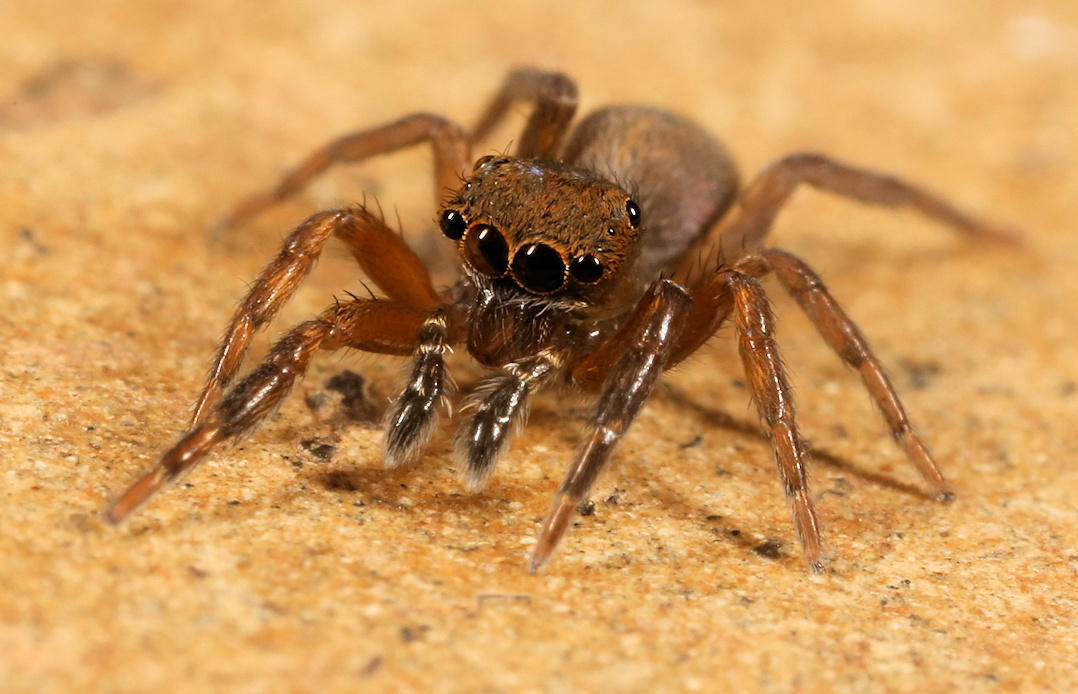
juvenile male

== Taxonomy ==
Cyrba armata, described by Wesołowska in 2006, was synonymized with Cyrba lineata by Wesołowska & Haddad in 2009.

== Conservation ==
Cyrba lineata is listed as Least Concern due to its wide geographical range. In South Africa, it is protected in eight protected areas including iSimangaliso Wetland Park, Ithala Game Reserve, Mbuluzi Game Reserve, Ndumo Game Reserve, Tembe Elephant Park, Blouberg Nature Reserve, Kruger National Park and Blyde River Canyon Nature Reserve. There are no significant threats to the species.
