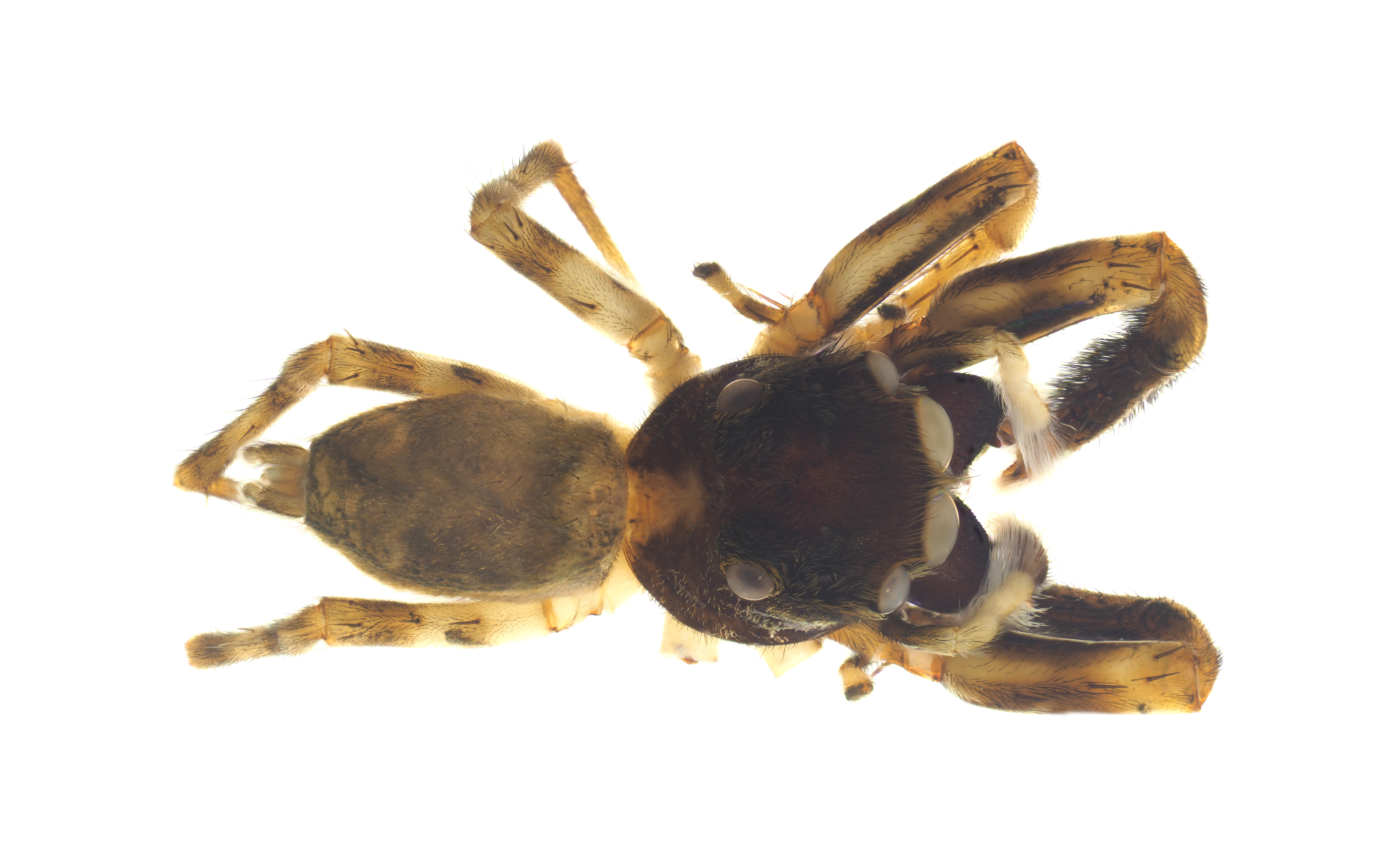
- Jacksonoides kochi

Scientific classification
- Kingdom: Animalia
- Phylum: Arthropoda
- Subphylum: Chelicerata
- Class: Arachnida
- Order: Araneae
- Infraorder: Araneomorphae
- Family: Salticidae
- Subfamily: Salticinae
- Genus: Jacksonoides; Wanless, 1988

Type species
- Jacksonoides queenslandicus Wanless, 1988

Species
- See text.

= Jacksonoides =

Genus of spiders

Jacksonoides is a spider genus of the jumping spider family, Salticidae.

== Species ==
As of June 2017, the World Spider Catalog lists the following species in the genus:

- Jacksonoides atypicus Żabka & Patoleta, 2016 – Queensland
- Jacksonoides blaszaki Żabka & Patoleta, 2016 – Queensland
- Jacksonoides cameronae Żabka & Patoleta, 2016 – Queensland
- Jacksonoides deelemanae Żabka & Patoleta, 2016 – Queensland
- Jacksonoides distinctus Wanless, 1988 – Queensland
- Jacksonoides dziabaszewskii Żabka & Patoleta, 2016 – Queensland
- Jacksonoides eileenae Wanless, 1988 – Queensland
- Jacksonoides jacksoni Żabka & Patoleta, 2016 – Queensland
- Jacksonoides kochi (Simon, 1900) – Queensland
- Jacksonoides lucynae Żabka & Patoleta, 2016 – Queensland
- Jacksonoides nubilis Wanless, 1988 – Queensland
- Jacksonoides queenslandicus Wanless, 1988 – Queensland
- Jacksonoides simplexipalpis Wanless, 1988 – Queensland
- Jacksonoides subtilis Wanless, 1988 – Queensland
- Jacksonoides venustus Żabka & Patoleta, 2016 – Queensland
- Jacksonoides voyteki Żabka & Patoleta, 2016 – Queensland
