= Goleba punctata =

Scientific classification
- Kingdom: Animalia
- Phylum: Arthropoda
- Subphylum: Chelicerata
- Class: Arachnida
- Order: Araneae
- Infraorder: Araneomorphae
- Family: Salticidae
- Subfamily: Asemoneinae
- Genus: Goleba
- Species: G. punctata

Binomial name
- Goleba punctata (G. W. Peckham, E. G. Peckham & Wheeler, 1889)

Species of jumping spider

Goleba punctata is a species of jumping spider in the genus Goleba. The species has been identified in Madagascar. The female was first described by George Peckham, Elizabeth Peckham and W.H. Wheeler in 1889. Initially placed in the genus Asemonea, the species was moved to Goleba in 1980 by Fred Wanless. The spider is medium-sized, between 6.6 and 6.9 mm (0.26 and 0.27 in) in total length. Its carapace, the upper side of its forward section, is yellow-brown with a pattern of broken dark reddish-brown bands. Its rear section, or abdomen, is whitish-yellow with a pattern of purple-black stripes and spots. Its pale yellow legs have many spines. Its epigyne, the visible external part of its copulatory organs, has openings in the middle, which helps to distinguish the spider from the otherwise similar Goleba pallens.

== Taxonomy ==
Goleba punctata is a species of jumping spider, a member of the family Salticidae, that was first described by the arachnologists George Peckham, Elizabeth Peckham and William H. Wheeler in 1889. They assigned it to the genus Asemonea, first circumscribed by Octavius Pickard-Cambridge in 1869, with the name Asemonea punctata. They found a juvenile female at the same time as an adult.

When Fred Wanless circumscribed Goleba in 1980, he moved Asemonea punctatato the new genus. Wanless described the genus name as "an arbitrary combination of letters". He allocated the species to the group pallens, which are distinguished from other members of the genus by a study of their copulatory organs. Molecular analysis demonstrates that the genus is similar to Asemonea and Pandisus. In Wayne Maddison's 2015 study of spider phylogenetic classification, the genus was a member of the subfamily Asemoneinae. A year later, in 2016, Jerzy Prószyński placed the genus Goleba in the Asemoneines group of genera.

== Description ==
Goleba spiders are medium-sized, with males and females similar in size. The female has a total length of between 6.6 and 6.9 mm (0.26 and 0.27 in). Its yellow-brown carapace, the upper side of its forward section, ranges from 2.64 to 2.88 mm (0.104 to 0.113 in) in length and is typically 2.28 mm (0.090 in) wide and 1.12 mm (0.044 in) high. It has a pattern of broken dark reddish-brown bands on its back and many of its eyes are surrounded with black patches. Its underside, or sternum, is plain yellow. Its clypeus is covered in fine shiny white hairs. Its chelicerae are yellow-brown and have three teeth at the front and seven behind. The remaining mouthparts, the labium and maxillae, are pale yellow.

The spider's rear section, or abdomen, is longer than its carapace, typically 2.28 mm (0.090 in) in length. Whitish-yellow, it is covered with very fine light yellowish hairs and has a pattern of purple-black stripes visible to the front and spots to the rear. The spider has whitish-yellow spinnerets, the rearmost pair having a long terminal article. The spider's legs are pale yellow and have many spines. Its epigyne, the visible external part of its copulatory organs, is rounded and has distinctive openings in the middle. It's copulatory ducts that are tightly coiled, with half as many coils as the related Goleba punctata. These lead to bean-like spermathecae. The position of the openings help distinguish the spider from the otherwise similar Goleba pallens. The male has not been described.

== Distribution ==
Goleba spiders are found across Africa Goleba puncatata is endemic to Madagascar. The spider has been seen living on the Andringitra Massif at an altitude of 2,100 m (6,900 ft) above sea level.
