= Tauala elongata =

Scientific classification
- Kingdom: Animalia
- Phylum: Arthropoda
- Subphylum: Chelicerata
- Class: Arachnida
- Order: Araneae
- Infraorder: Araneomorphae
- Family: Salticidae
- Genus: Tauala
- Species: T. elongata

Binomial name
- Tauala elongata Peng & Li, 2002

Species of spider

Tauala elongata is a species of jumping spider.

== Appearance ==
The species is similar to T. lepidus.

== Name ==
The specific name is derived from the form of the elongated oval abdomen of the new species.

== Distribution ==
Tauala elongata is only known from Taiwan.
