= Cyrba dotata =

Table Mountain Cyrba Jumping Spider

Scientific classification
- Kingdom: Animalia
- Phylum: Arthropoda
- Subphylum: Chelicerata
- Class: Arachnida
- Order: Araneae
- Infraorder: Araneomorphae
- Family: Salticidae
- Genus: Cyrba
- Species: C. dotata

Binomial name
- Cyrba dotata Peckham & Peckham, 1903

Species of spider

Cyrba dotata is a species of spider in the family Salticidae. It is endemic to South Africa and is commonly known as the Table Mountain Cyrba jumping spider.

== Distribution ==
Cyrba dotata is found only in South Africa. The species is known from several localities around Cape Town in the Western Cape Province.

== Habitat and ecology ==
C. dotata is a ground dweller that has been sampled from the Fynbos Biome at altitudes ranging from 7 to 373 m. It was also sampled from vineyards at Rawsonville.

== Conservation ==
Cyrba dotata is listed as Data Deficient for taxonomic reasons. More sampling is needed to collect the male and determine the species' range. Able to survive in agroecosystems therefore not significantly threatened. Protected in the Table Mountain National Park and Kirstenbosch National Botanical Garden.
