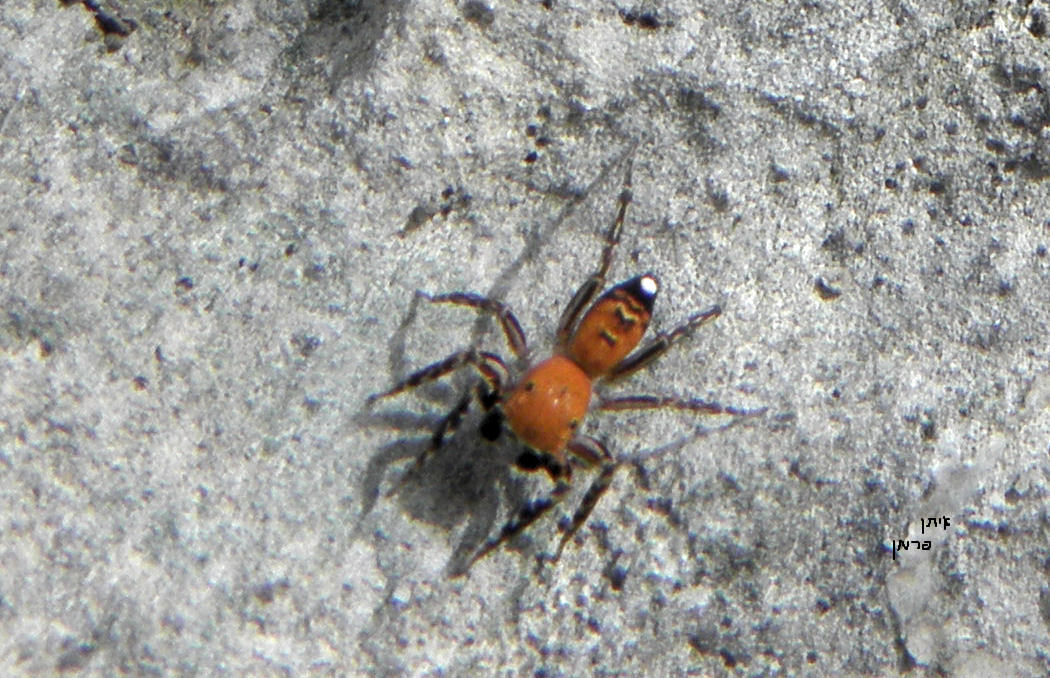

Scientific classification
- Kingdom: Animalia
- Phylum: Arthropoda
- Subphylum: Chelicerata
- Class: Arachnida
- Order: Araneae
- Infraorder: Araneomorphae
- Family: Salticidae
- Genus: Cyrba
- Species: C. algerina

Binomial name
- Cyrba algerina Lucas, 1846

= Cyrba algerina =

Species of spider

Cyrba algerina, the Algerian jumping spider, is a species of jumping spider in the subfamily Spartaeinae. Females grow to 4.2 to 6 millimeters, males 3.5 to 4 millimeters in size. It is the only species of Cyrba found in Europe.

== Ecology ==
Cyrba algerina is araneophagic and feeds on web-building spiders, but given a lengthy enough fasting period it will practice entomophagy. It has also displayed web-invading kleptoparasitism and oophagy.
