= Jacksonoides deelemanae =

Scientific classification
- Kingdom: Animalia
- Phylum: Arthropoda
- Subphylum: Chelicerata
- Class: Arachnida
- Order: Araneae
- Infraorder: Araneomorphae
- Family: Salticidae
- Genus: Jacksonoides
- Species: J. deelemanae

Binomial name
- Jacksonoides deelemanae Żabka & Patoleta, 2016

Species of jumping spider

Jacksonoides deelemanae is a species of jumping spider in the genus Jacksonoides.
