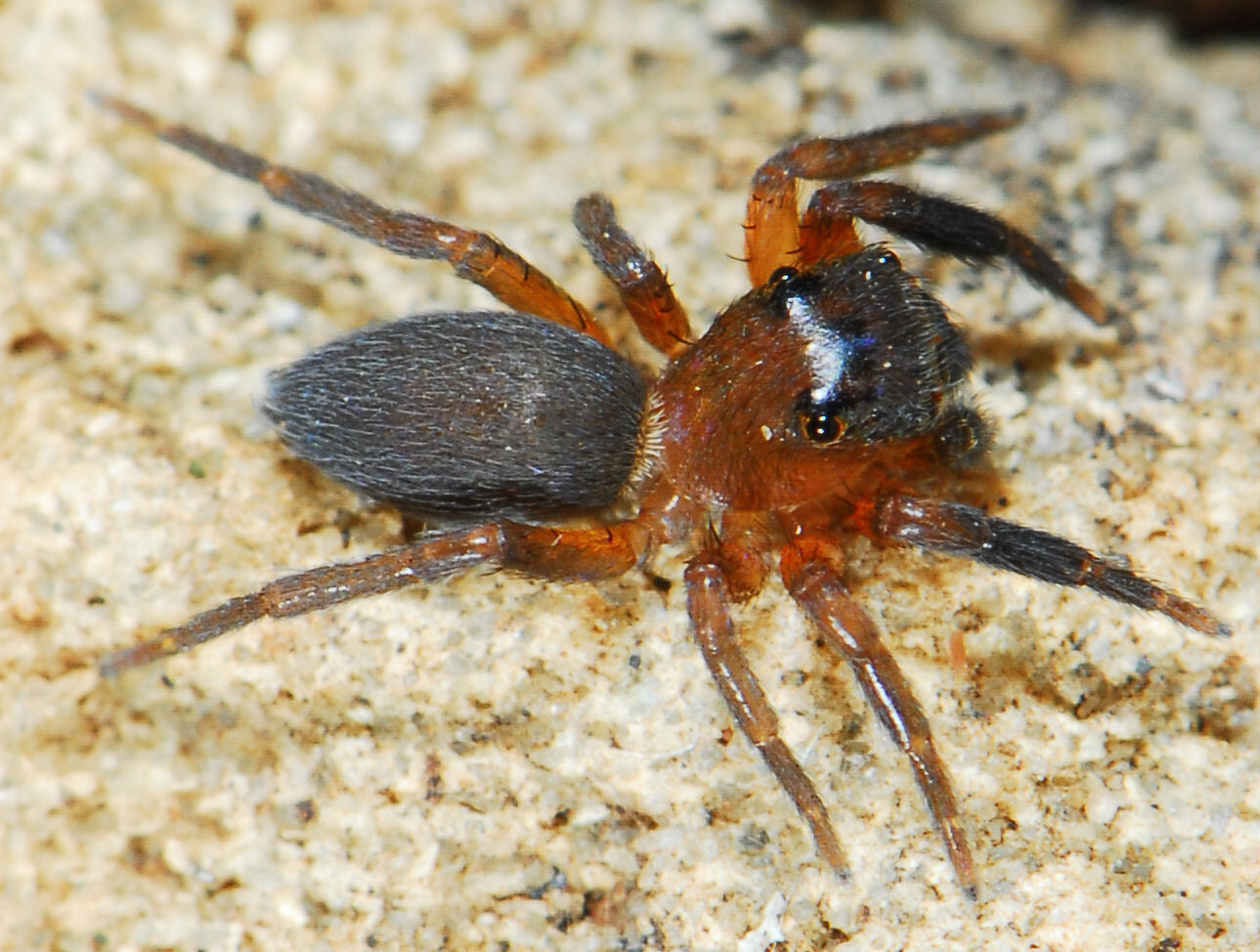
- female
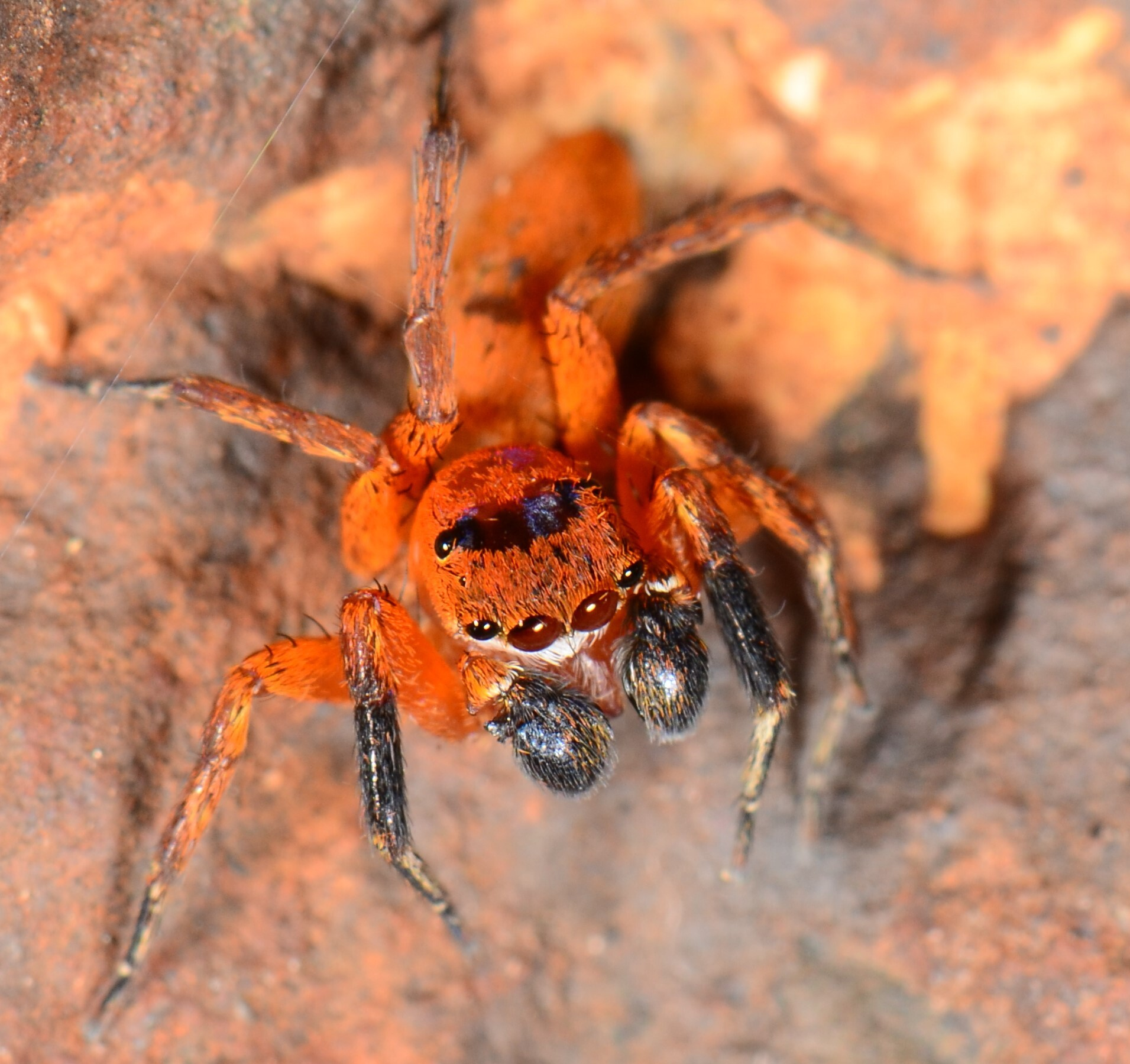
- male

Scientific classification
- Kingdom: Animalia
- Phylum: Arthropoda
- Subphylum: Chelicerata
- Class: Arachnida
- Order: Araneae
- Infraorder: Araneomorphae
- Family: Salticidae
- Genus: Cyrba
- Species: C. nigrimana

Binomial name
- Cyrba nigrimana Simon, 1900

Synonyms
- Cyrba nigrimanus Simon, 1900

= Cyrba nigrimana =

Orange Cyrba Jumping Spider

Species of spider

Cyrba nigrimana is a species of spider in the family Salticidae. It is found in southern Africa and is commonly known as the orange Cyrba jumping spider.

== Distribution ==
Cyrba nigrimana is found in Tanzania, Mozambique and South Africa.

In South Africa, the species is known from Eastern Cape Province, Free State Province, Gauteng Province, KwaZulu-Natal Province, Limpopo Province, Mpumalanga Province and North West Province.

== Habitat and ecology ==
Usually collected from under logs and rocks. It was sampled from pitfall traps and litter sifting from the Fynbos, Grassland, Savanna and Thicket biomes, Ground-dwelling salticid at altitudes ranging from 7 to 1,730 m. Also recorded in maize fields.

== Description ==
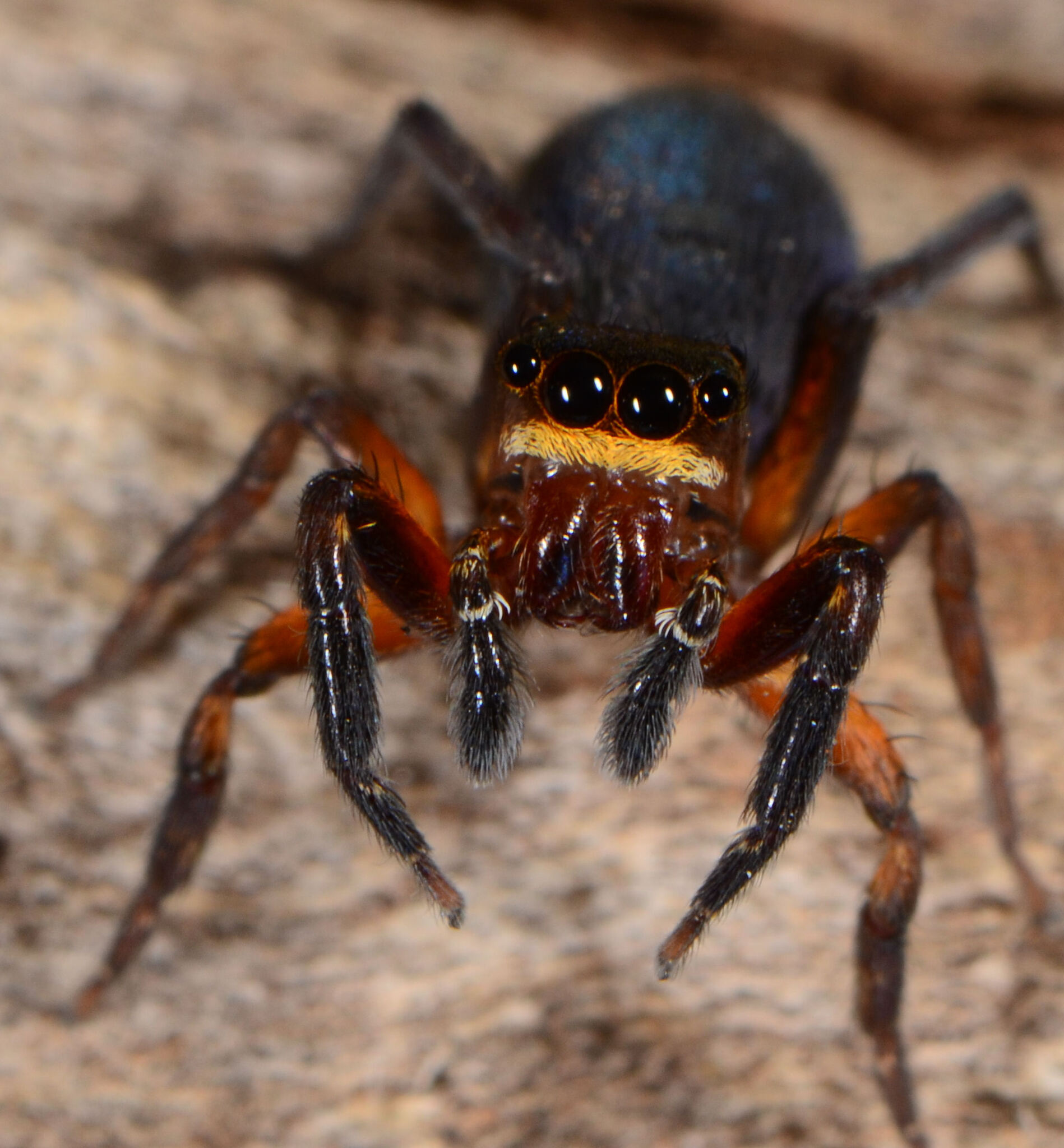
female

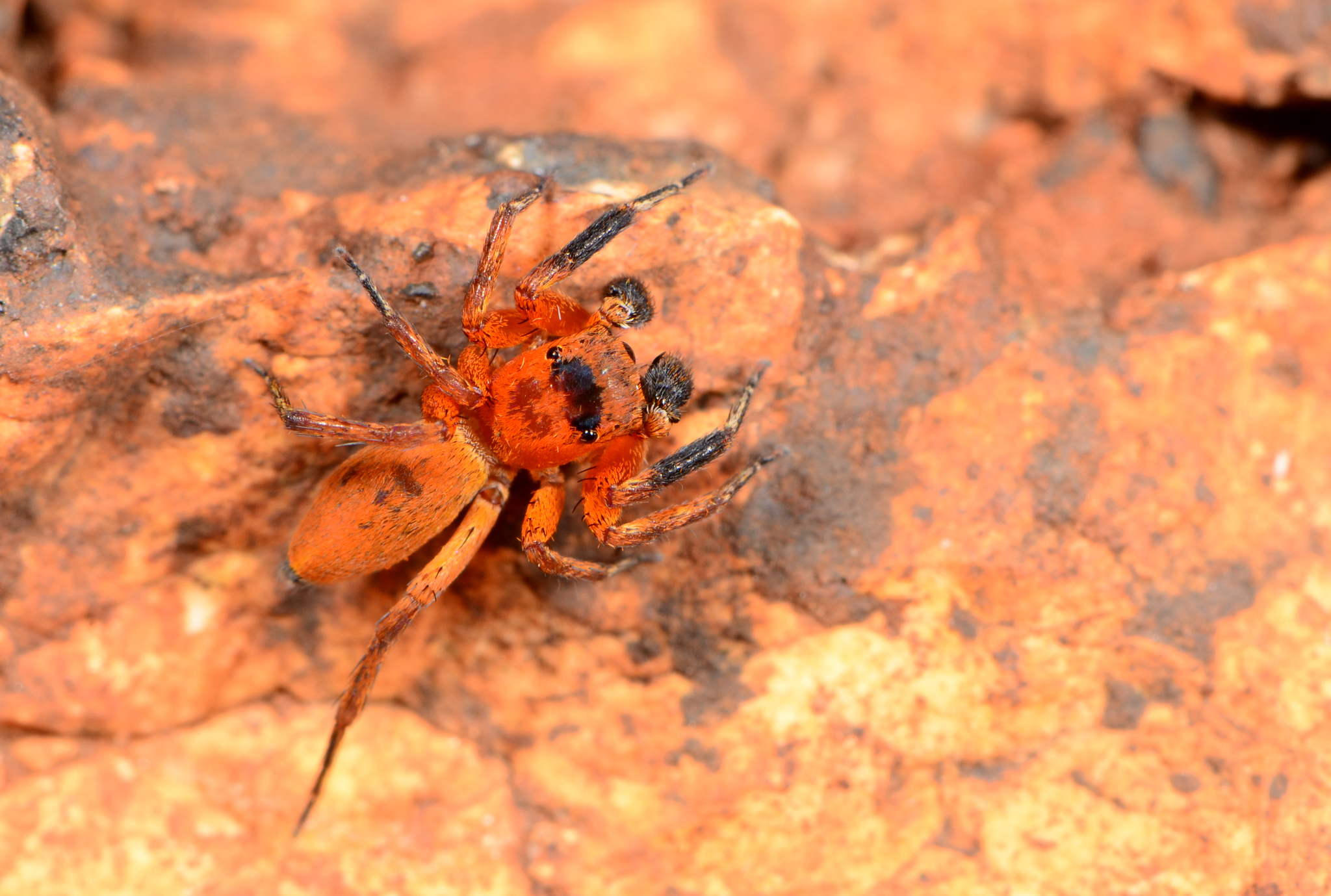
male

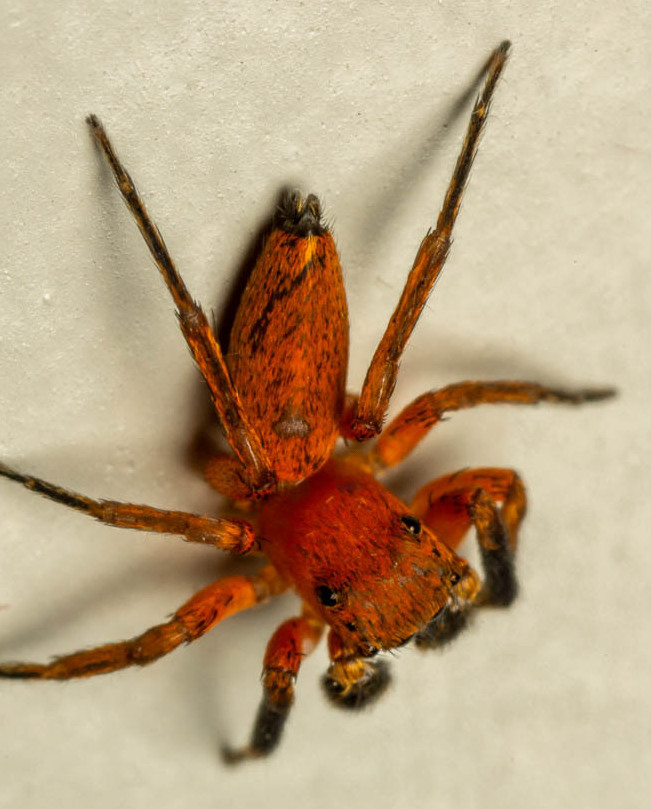
male

== Taxonomy ==
Cyrba nigrimana was redescribed by Azarkina & Logunov in 2010 and by Haddad & Wesołowska in 2011.

== Conservation ==
Cyrba nigrimana is listed as Least Concern due to its wide distribution. In South Africa, it is protected in more than 10 protected areas including Addo Elephant National Park, Ndumo Game Reserve, Blouberg Nature Reserve and Kruger National Park. There are no known threats to the species.
