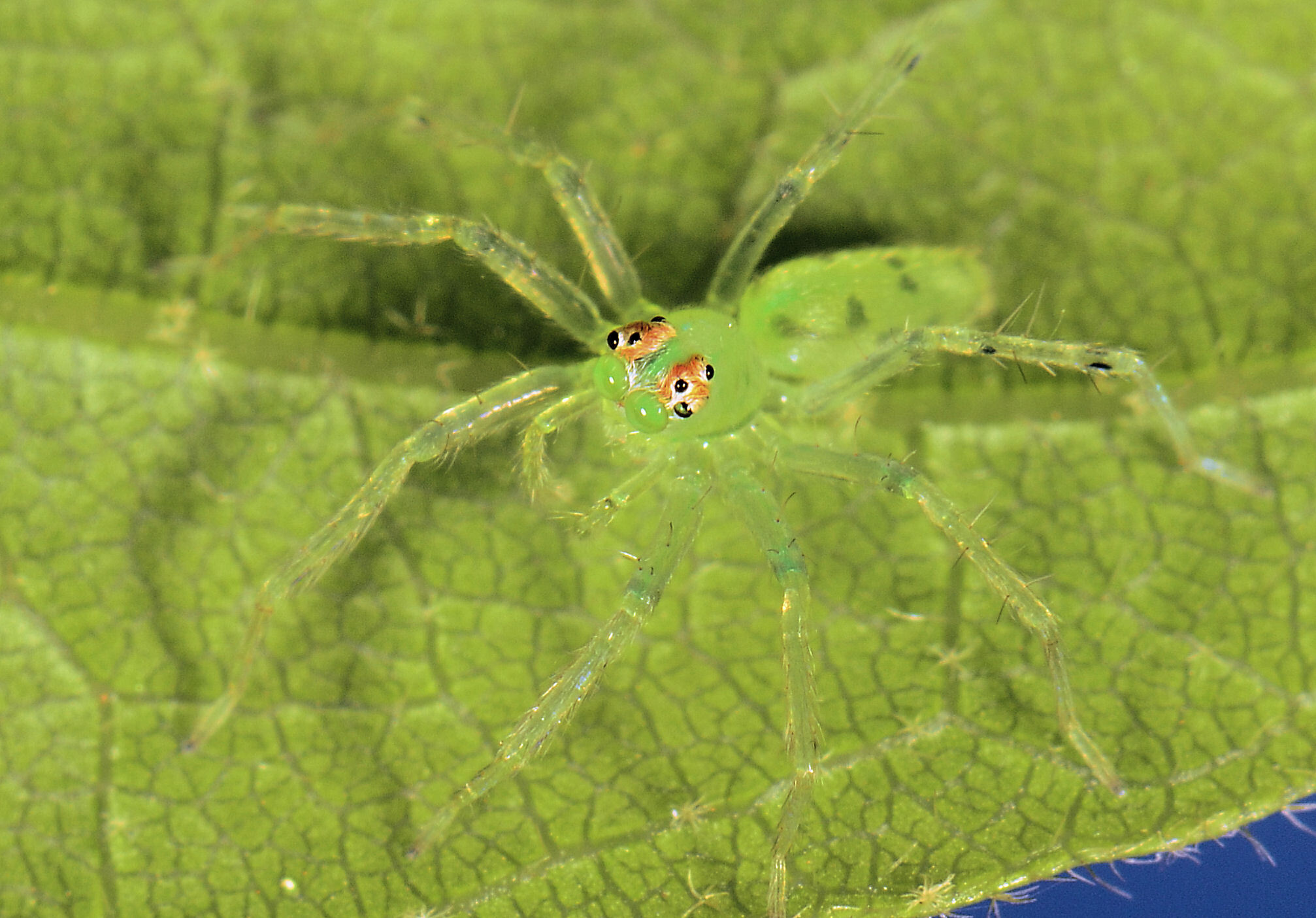
- A juvenile female

Scientific classification
- Kingdom: Animalia
- Phylum: Arthropoda
- Subphylum: Chelicerata
- Class: Arachnida
- Order: Araneae
- Infraorder: Araneomorphae
- Family: Salticidae
- Subfamily: Asemoneinae
- Genus: Goleba
- Species: G. puella

Binomial name
- Goleba puella (Simon, 1885)

= Goleba puella =

Species of jumping spider

Goleba puella, the Goleba jumping spider, is the type species of Goleba, a genus of jumping spiders. Living across Southern Africa, the species has been found in Angola, Democratic Republic of the Congo, Eswatini, Ghana, Kenya, Mozambique and South Africa. A medium-sized spider, Goleba puella measures between 4.88 and 6.04 mm (0.192 and 0.238 in) in total length. It is predominantly green apart from its yellow legs, although some spiders have a faint pattern of brown stripes on their carapace or reddish hairs on their abdomen. The spider has eyes that are mounted on tubercles and surrounded by black rings and a total of nine teeth, four at the front and five at the back. The spider mainly feeds on insects like ants and flies, which is catches by lunging, although it will also eat other food like flowers and nectar particularly when young. They will build nests of silk in which they will lay their egg sacs, the female often staying with the eggs until they hatch. It was first described by Eugène Simon in 1885. Initially placed in the genus Asemonea, the species was moved to Goleba in 1980 by Fred Wanless.

== Taxonomy and etymology ==
Goleba puella, known by the common name Goleba jumping spider, is a species of jumping spider, a member of the family Salticidae, that was first described by the arachnologist Eugène Simon in 1885. He assigned it to the genus Asemonea, first circumscribed by Octavius Pickard-Cambridge in 1869, with the name Asemonea puella.

When Fred Wanless circumscribed Goleba in 1980, he named Asemonea puella as the type species for the new genus. Wanless described the genus name as "an arbitrary combination of letters". He allocated the species to the group puella, which are distinguished from other members of the genus by a study of their copulatory organs. Molecular analysis demonstrates that the genus is similar to Asemonea and Pandisus. In Wayne Maddison's 2015 study of spider phylogenetic classification, the genus was a member of the subfamily Asemoneinae. A year later, in 2016, Jerzy Prószyński placed the genus Goleba in the Asemoneines group of genera.

== Description ==
Goleba spiders are medium-sized, with males and females similar in size. Goleba puella has a typical total length of between 4.88 and 6.04 mm (0.192 and 0.238 in). Its pear-shaped carapace, the upper side of its forward section, is between 2.04 and 2.28 mm (0.080 and 0.090 in) long, between 1.56 and 1.76 mm (0.061 and 0.069 in) wide and 0.92 and 0.96 mm (0.036 and 0.038 in) high.

The spider is almost uniformly green. It has a fovea on its back. Some spiders have a pattern of faint brown stripes barely visible on the top of their carapace. The underside, or sternum, is plain yellow. Its eyes sit on tubercles and are surrounded by black rings. Its clypeus is medium high and marked with a band of reddish hairs that extend onto the carapace. Its chelicerae are marked with a brown band and have four teeth to the front and five to the back. The remaining mouthparts, the labium and maxillae, are yellow. Its labium is wider than it is long and about the length of its maxillae.

The rear section, or abdomen, of Goleba puella is lighter and narrower than its carapace, with the male more slender than the female. The male's abdomen has a faint pattern of reddish hair on the top. They both have yellow spinnerets. The spider's legs are long and thin, with particularly long metatarsal bones. They are mainly yellow with brown stripes and long spines.

The spider's copulatory organs are distinctive. The female's epigyne, the visible external part of its copulatory organs, is rounded with two copulatory openings leading via short insemination ducts to bulbous spermathecae and very long tubular accessory glands. The male has a very narrow cymbium that has a concave side that faces the palpal bulb. Its tegulum is shaped a bit like an axe and has a large bulge near the bottom. The embolus projects from near the base of the palpal bulb and follows the curve of the cymbium so that it is visible at the top of the tegulum. The palpal tibia has a single small curved spike, or tibial apophysis, projecting downwards.

== Behaviour ==
Like other jumping spiders, member of the Goleba genus are diurnal hunters, using their powerful eyes to catch their prey. The spider will hunt prey by lunging and will eat a wide range of different insects. Unusually for jumping spiders, it shows no preference to eating dead ants or flies. They will also eat nectar. Younger spiders may also complement their diet with flowers.

The male will walk with pedipalps erect, which is unusual amongst jumping spiders. They frequently display when they see a female, although less frequently when near to a nest. While males will display before other females, the female is much less likely to display than other species when approached by another female. Displays can range from posturing to abdomen twitching. Sometimes, particularly when displaying before a female, the male will perform a zig-zag dance. While the male may use it sense of smell to identify males, female spiders do not have the same discernment.

The female will lay her egg sacs in nests made of silk webs that are typically ten times the length of the spider. The male and female will copulate both inside and outside the nests. The female will often stay near the eggs until they hatch.

== Distribution and habitat ==
Goleba spiders are found across Africa Goleba puella lives in Angola, Democratic Republic of the Congo, eSwatini, Ghana, Kenya, Mozambique and South Africa. Some of the most studied specimen came from Angola. In Kenya, the species has been found in Kilifi. It lives in forests that are near rivers, broadleaf woodland and subtropical bush. The species lives on leaves, to which the spiders attach webs that are used to catch insects as well as hold their eggs.
