= Sadies =

Scientific classification
- Kingdom: Animalia
- Phylum: Arthropoda
- Subphylum: Chelicerata
- Class: Arachnida
- Order: Araneae
- Infraorder: Araneomorphae
- Family: Salticidae
- Subfamily: Salticinae
- Genus: Sadies; Wanless, 1984

Type species
- S. fulgida Wanless, 1984

Species
- 5, see text

Genus of spiders

Sadies is a genus of African jumping spiders that was first described by F. R. Wanless in 1984.

== Species ==
As of August 2019 it contains five species, found only in Africa:

- Sadies castanea Ledoux, 2007 – Réunion
- Sadies fulgida Wanless, 1984 (type) – Seychelles
- Sadies gibbosa Wanless, 1984 – Seychelles
- Sadies seychellensis Wanless, 1984 – Seychelles
- Sadies trifasciata Wanless, 1984 – Seychelles
