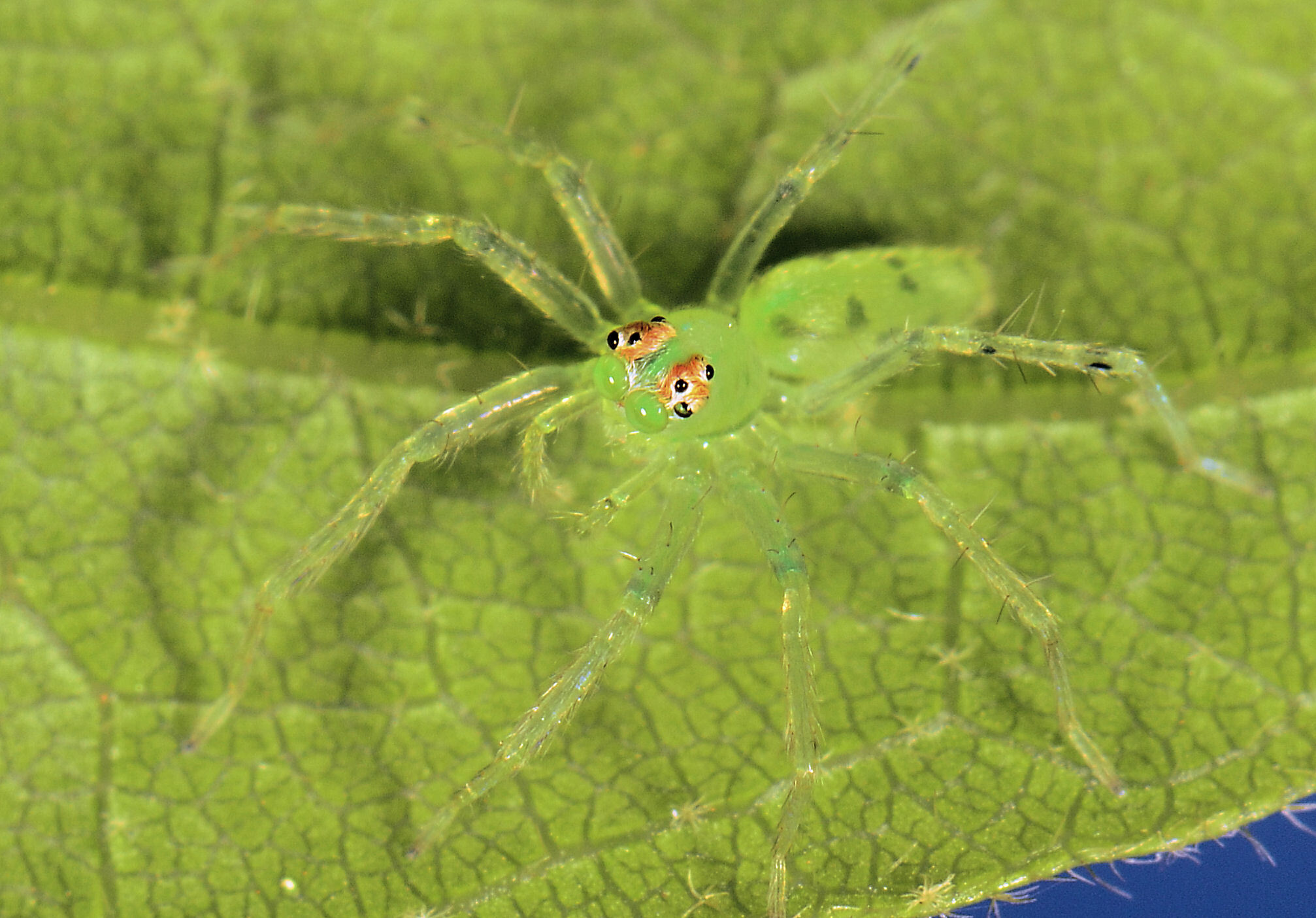
- juvenile female G. puella
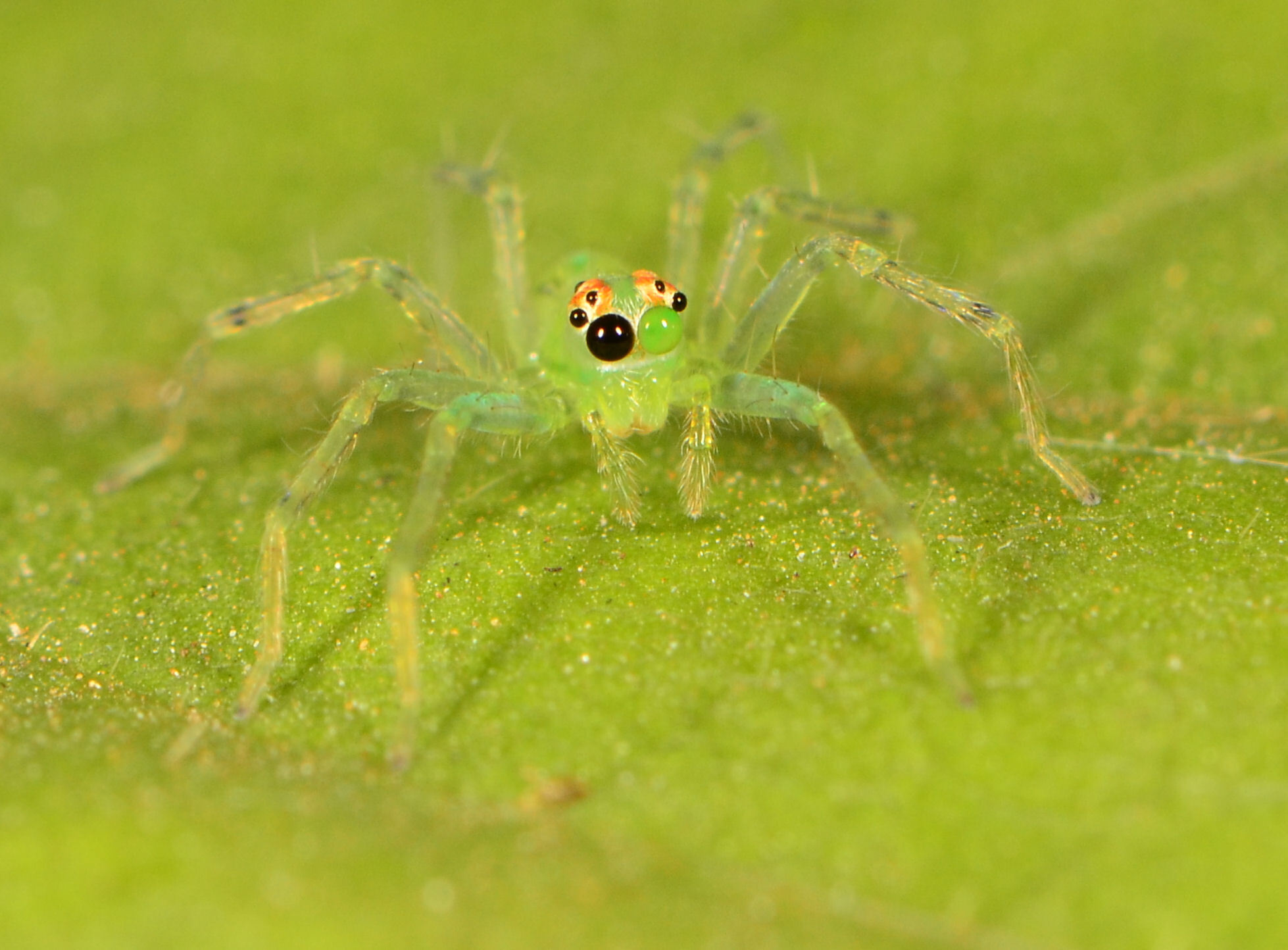
- juvenile female G. puella

Scientific classification
- Kingdom: Animalia
- Phylum: Arthropoda
- Subphylum: Chelicerata
- Class: Arachnida
- Order: Araneae
- Infraorder: Araneomorphae
- Family: Salticidae
- Subfamily: Asemoneinae
- Genus: Goleba; Wanless, 1980

Type species
- G. puella (Simon, 1885)

Species
- 5, see text

= Goleba =

Genus of spiders

Goleba is a genus of African jumping spiders that was first described by F. R. Wanless in 1980.

== Species ==
As of October 2025, this genus includes five species:

- Goleba jocquei Szűts, 2001 – Rep. Congo
- Goleba lyra Maddison & Zhang, 2006 – Madagascar
- Goleba pallens (Blackwall, 1877) – Seychelles
- Goleba puella (Simon, 1885) – Ghana, DR Congo, Kenya, Angola, Mozambique, South Africa (type species)
- Goleba punctata (G. W. Peckham, E. G. Peckham & Wheeler, 1889) – Madagascar
