= Tauala =

Scientific classification
- Kingdom: Animalia
- Phylum: Arthropoda
- Subphylum: Chelicerata
- Class: Arachnida
- Order: Araneae
- Infraorder: Araneomorphae
- Family: Salticidae
- Subfamily: Salticinae
- Genus: Tauala; Wanless, 1988

Type species
- T. lepidus Wanless, 1988

Species
- 13, see text

Genus of spiders

Tauala is a genus of jumping spiders that was first described by F. R. Wanless in 1988. The name "Tauala" is an arbitrary combination of letters.

== Species ==
As of August 2019 it contains thirteen species, found only in Taiwan and Queensland:

- Tauala alveolatus Wanless, 1988 – Australia (Queensland)
- Tauala athertonensis Gardzinska, 1996 – Australia (Queensland)
- Tauala australiensis Wanless, 1988 – Australia (Queensland)
- Tauala bilobatus Żabka & Patoleta, 2015 – Australia (Queensland)
- Tauala daviesae Wanless, 1988 – Australia (Queensland)
- Tauala elongata Peng & Li, 2002 – Taiwan (=Tauala elongatus as corrected formation of suffix inflection for gender agreement).
- Tauala lepidus Wanless, 1988 (type) – Australia (Queensland)
- Tauala minutus Wanless, 1988 – Australia (Queensland)
- Tauala ottoi Żabka & Patoleta, 2015 – Australia (Queensland)
- Tauala palumaensis Żabka & Patoleta, 2015 – Australia (Queensland)
- Tauala setosus Żabka & Patoleta, 2015 – Australia (Queensland)
- Tauala splendidus Wanless, 1988 – Australia (Queensland)
- Tauala zborowskii Żabka & Patoleta, 2015 – Australia (Queensland)
