= Fred Wanless =

British arachnologist (1940–2017)

- Born: 1940
- Died: 15 December 2017 (aged 76–77)
- Scientific career
- Fields: Arachnology
- Workplaces: Natural History Museum, London; Australian Museum

Fred R. Wanless (1940 – 15 December 2017) was a British arachnologist. Active in the field especially in the 1970s and 1980s, he described several dozen taxa, in particular among the spiders of the Salticidae family. Wanless played a significant role in the British Arachnological Society being its member in 1969–1973, 1974–1976 and 1986–1989, and Meetings Secretary in 1973–1978. From 1973 to 1988 he described 137 new species and 13 new genera.

== Career ==
He worked at the Natural History Museum in London, dealing with the arachnid collections and at the Australian Museum in Brisbane. At the Museum Wanless developed interest in African jumping spiders while editing Doug Clark's notes and later working on their collaborative paper. During his work at the Museum he published a number of academic papers and supervised the studies of post-graduate students.

Wanless played a significant role in the British Arachnological Society being its member in 1969–1973, 1974–1976 and 1986–1989, and Meetings Secretary in 1973–1978. From 1973 to 1988 Wanless described 137 new species and 13 new genera. Among them only nine species (7%) have been later synonymized, while all his genera and the subfamily Spartaeinae remain valid.

Wanless travelled extensively as part of his research working notably in Borneo and Botswana. In 1977, he joined the Royal Geographical Society's expedition to Gunung Mulu National Park in Sarawak where he collected and described local species. Wanless retired from the National History Museum in 2003, however he continued studying grasses and sedges publishing a guide on them in 2013. Upon retirement, Wanless became increasingly involved in the work of the Wren Group and the Lakehouse Lake project being a member of its committee.

Fred R. Wanless died on 15 December 2017.

== Taxa described ==
- Spartaeinae Wanless, 1984, spider subfamily (Salticidae)
- Jacksonoides Wanless, 1988, spider (Salticidae)
- Sadies Wanless, 1984, spider (Salticidae)
- Sondra Wanless, 1988, spider (Salticidae)
- Tauala Wanless, 1988, spider (Salticidae)

== Named in his honour ==
- Wanlessia Wijesinghe, 1992, ragno (Salticidae)
- Myrmarachne wanlessi Edmunds & Prószynski, 2003, ragno (Salticidae)
- Paculla wanlessi Bourne, 1981, ragno (Tetrablemmidae)
- Paracyrba wanlessi Zabka & Kovac, 1996, ragno (Salticidae)
- Yaginumanis wanlessi Zhang & Li, 2005, ragno (Salticidae)

== Studies and research on Salticidae ==
- Wanless F.R. 1973 - vedi: Cutler B., Wanless F.R. 1973. A review of the genus Mantisatta (Araneae: Salticidae). Bulletin of the British Arachnological Society, Londra, 2(9): 184-189, f 1-9.
- Wanless F.R. 1975. Spiders of the family Salticidae from the upper slopes of Everest and Makalu. Bull. Br. Arachnol. Soc., 3(5): 132-136.
- Wanless F.R. 1978a. A revision of the spider genera Belippo and Myrmarachne (Araneae, Salticidae) in the Ethiopian region. Bulletin of the British Museum (Natural History) (Zoology), Londra, 33(1): 1-139, t 1-84, photos 1-6.
- Wanless F.R. 1978b. A revision of the spider genus Bocus Simon (Araneae: Salticidae). Bull. Br. Mus. Nat. (Zool.) 33(4): 239-244.
- Wanless F.R. 1978c. A revision of the spider genus Sobasina (Araneae, Salticidae). Bull. Br. Mus. Nat. (Zool.), London, 33(4): 245-257, t 1-8, phot 1.
- Wanless F.R. 1978d. A revision of the spider genus Marengo (Araneae: Salticidae). Bull. Br. Mus. Nat. (Zool.), London, 33(4): 259-278, t 1-10, photos 1-3.
- Wanless F.R. 1978e. On the identity of the spider Emertonius exasperans Peckham and Peckham (Araneae, Salticidae). Bull. Br. Mus. Nat. (Zool.), London, 33(4): 235-238, t 1-2.
- Wanless F.R. 1978f. A revision of the spider genus Portia (Araneae, Salticidae). Bull. Br. Mus. Nat. (Zool.), London, 34(3): 83-124, t 1-13, phots 1-5.
- Wanless F.R. 1979a. On the spider genus Cynapes (Araneae, Salticidae). Bull. Br. Mus. Nat. (Zool.), London, 37(1): 67-72, t 1-2.
- Wanless F.R. 1979b. A revision of the spider genus Brettus (Araneae, Salticidae). Bull. Br. Mus. Nat. (Zool.), London, 35(2): 127-200, t 1-4.
- Wanless F.R. 1980a. A revision of the spider genus Macopaeus (Araneae, Salticidae). Bull. Br. Mus. Nat. (Zool.), London, 38 (4): 219-223, t 1-3.
- Wanless F.R. 1980b. A revision of the spider genus Orthrus (Araneae, Salticidae). Bull. Br. Mus. Nat. (Zool.), London, 38 (4): 225-232, t 1-4.
- Wanless F.R. 1980c. A revision of the spider genus Onomastus (Araneae, Salticidae). Bull. Br. Mus. Nat. (Zool.), London, 39(3): 179-188, t 1-4.
- Wanless F.R. 1980d. A revision of the spider genera Asemonea and Pandisus (Araneae: Salticidae) Bull. Br. Mus. Nat. (Zool.) London, 39(4): 213-257, t 1-29.
- Wanless F.R. 1981a. A revision of the spider genus Hispo (Araneae, Salticidae). Bull. Br. Mus. Nat. (Zool.), London, 41(4): 179-198, t 19.
- Wanless F.R. 1981b. A revision of the spider genus Phaeacius (Araneae, Salticidae). Bull. Br. Mus. Nat. (Zool.), London, 41(4): 199-219, t 1-9.
- Wanless F.R. 1981c. A revision of the spider genus Cocalus (Araneae, Salticidae). Bull. Br. Mus. Nat. (Zool.), London, 41(5): 253-261, t 1-5.
- Wanless F.R. 1982. A revision of the spider genus Cocalodes with a description of a new related genus (Araneae, Salticidae). Bull. Br. Mus. Nat. (Zool.), London, 42(4): 263-298, t 1-21.
- Wanless F.R. 1983 [1984c]. Araneae-Salticidae. Contributions a l'etude de la faune terrestre des iles granitiques de l'archipel des Sechelles. Annales Musee Royal Afrique Centrale, serie in 8. Tervuren, 241: 1-84, t 1-26.
- Wanless F.R. 1984a. A review of the spider subfamily Spartaeinae nom. n. (Araneae: Salticidae) with description of six new genera. Bull. Br. Mus. Nat. (Zool.), London, 46(2): 135-198, t 1-29.
- Wanless F.R. 1984b. A revision of the spider genus Cyrba (Araneae:Salticidae) with the description of a new presumptive pheromon dispersing organ. Bull. Br. Mus. Nat. (Zool.), London, 47(7): 445-481, t 1-22
- Wanless F.R. 1985. A revision of the spider genera Holcolaetis and Sonoita (Araneae: Salticidae). Bull. Br. Mus. Nat. (Zool.), London, 48(4): 249-278, t 1-19.
- Wanless F.R. 1986. A revision of the spider genus Phyaces (Araneae: Salticidae). Bull. Br. Mus. Nat. (Zool.) 50: 103-108.
- Wanless F.R. 1987. Notes on spiders of the family Salticidae. 1. The genera Spartaeus, Mintonia and Taraxella. Bull. Br. Mus. Nat. (Zool.), London, 52(3): 107-137, t 1-20.
- Wanless F.R. 1988. A revision of the spider group Astieae (Araneae: Salticidae) in the Australasian Region. New Zealand journal of zoology, 15: 81-172, t 1-44.
- Wanless F.R., Clark D. J. 1975. On a collection of spiders of the family Salticidae from the Ivory Coast. Revue Zool. afr. 89(2): 273-296.
- Wanless F.R., Lubin Y.D. 1986. Diolenius minotaurus sp. nov., a remarkable horned jumping spider from Papua New Guinea (Araneae: Salticidae). J. Nat. Hist. 20: 1211-1220, t 1-6.
