= Sexual selection in spiders =

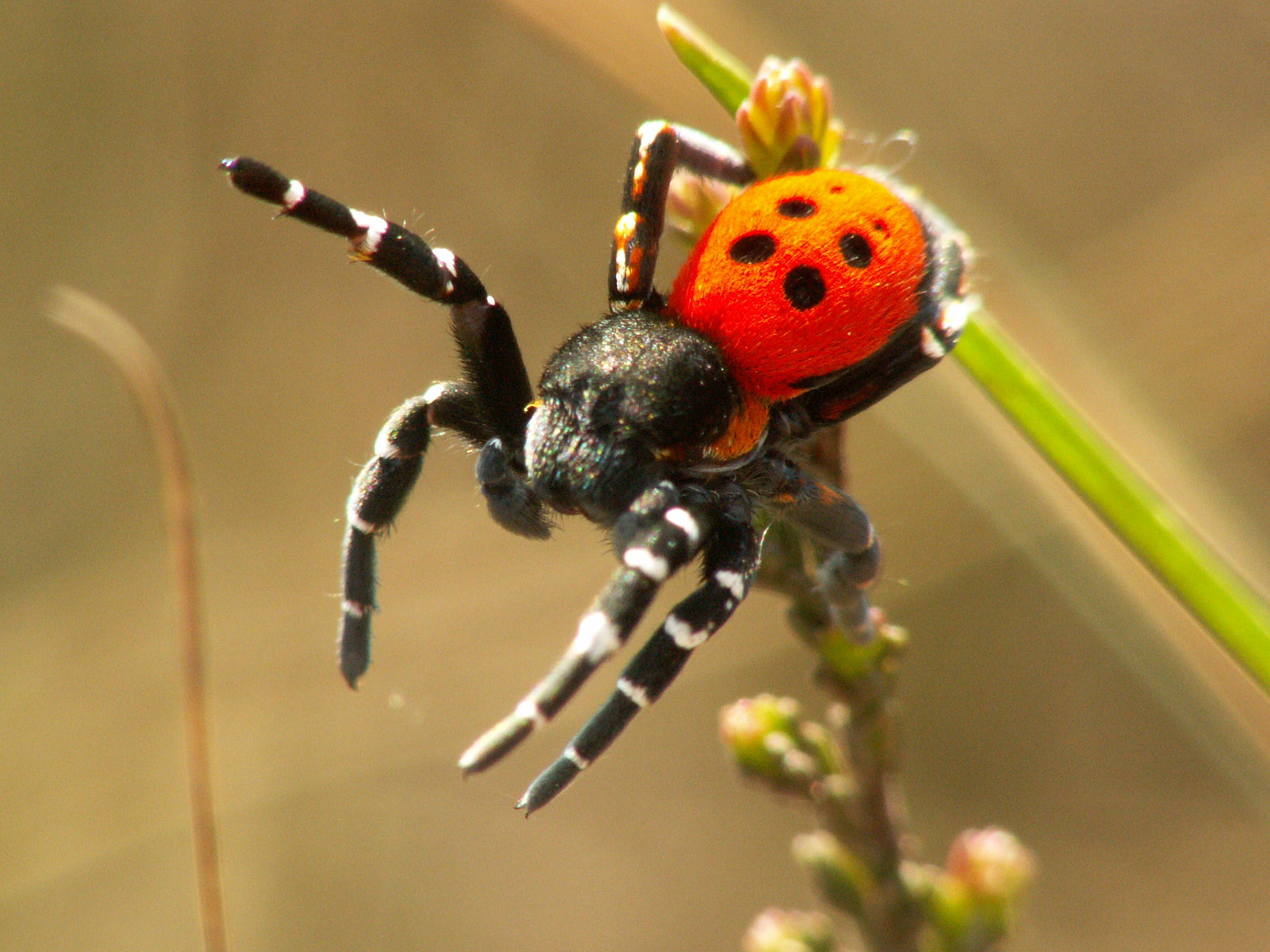
A male Eresus sandaliatus

Sexual selection in spiders shows how sexual selection explains the evolution of phenotypic traits in spiders. Male spiders have many complex courtship rituals and have to avoid being eaten by the females, with the males of most species surviving only a few matings and consequently having short life-spans.

Pre-copulatory mate choice processes have been observed in a wide range of spider species, including Stegodyphus lineatus, Argiope aurantia, Schizocosa floridana, Hygrolycosa rubrofasciata, and Schizocosa stridulans.

Sexual selection occurs after copulation as well as before copulation. Post-copulatory sexual selection involves sperm competition and cryptic female choice. Sperm competition occurs when the sperm of more than one male competes to fertilize the egg of the female. Cryptic female choice involves the expelling of a males sperm during or after copulations.

== Male to male competition ==
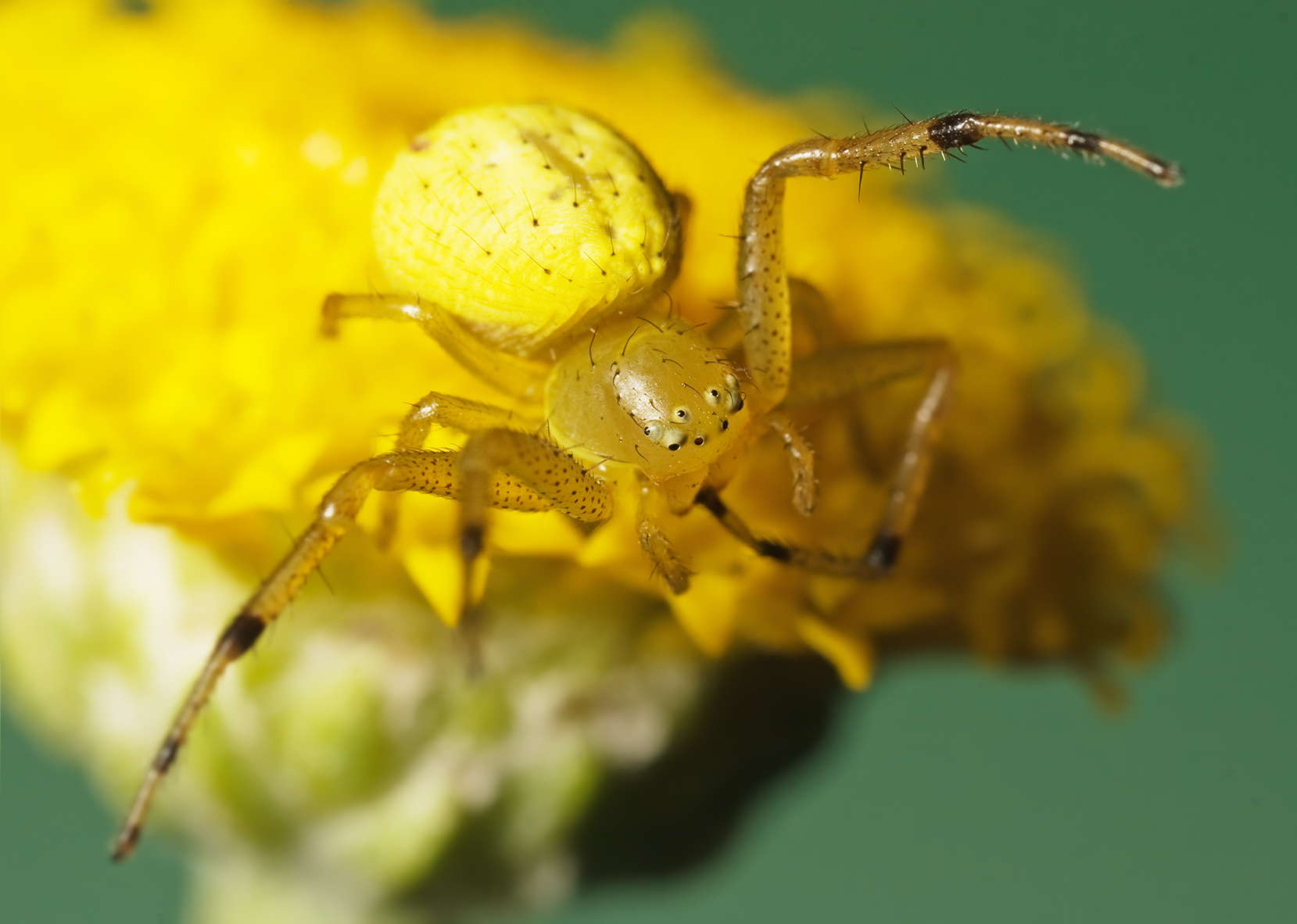
Thomisidae

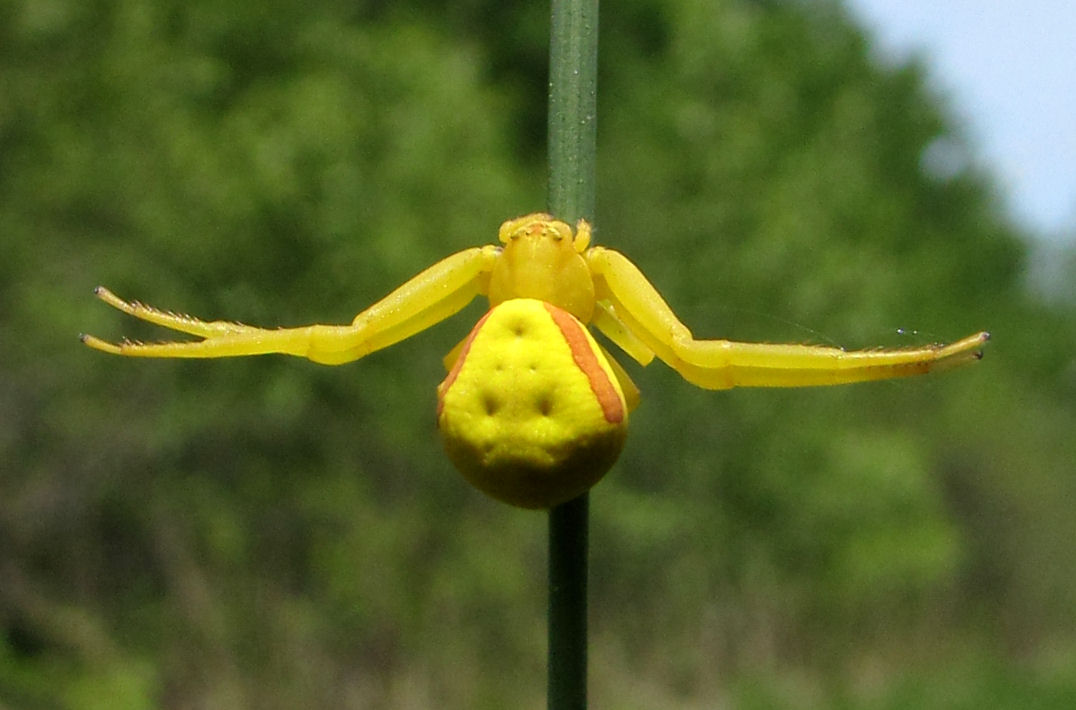
Misumena vatia

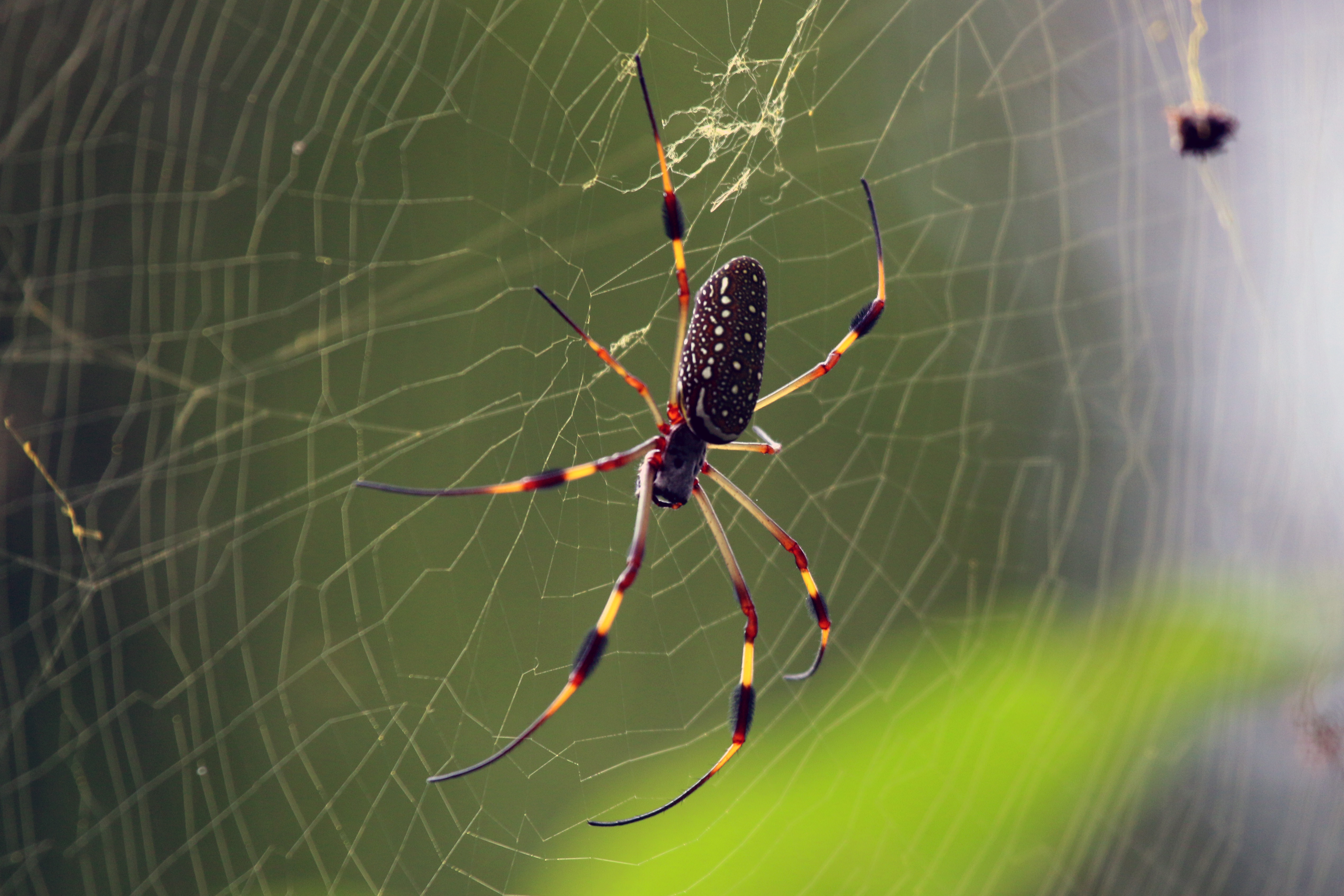
Nephila clavipes

Size is a factor in the reproductive success of males with species such as Stegodyphus lineatus, Argiope aurantia and Argyroneta aquatica showing sexual dimorphism, beneficial for larger males, stronger and more aggressive, who fight off the smaller ones using their large chelicerae and forelegs. This leads to a decrease in the paternal success for smaller males since they are unable to gain access to females. Argiope aurantia males can lose legs in combat, with the loss more prevalent in smaller males, evidence that larger males are favored in male-to-male competition. In the water spider Argyroneta aquatica, where males and females permanently live in the water the males are larger, indicating sexual selective pressures for large body size. The large male water spiders are more mobile, helping them obtain more females.

Sexual selection provides benefits to smaller male spiders under certain conditions, such as Misumena vatia and Nephila clavipes, whose smaller males climb faster to reach their mates: Explained by the gravity hypothesis, outcompeting larger males thus having more reproductive success, especially when females live in high patches of flowers, whereas females live in low-lying areas, larger males are favored.

In spiders like Tetragnathidae, Araneidae, Thomisidae and Pholcidae there is an optimal body size that favors climbing speed. Smaller males will have an advantage over the largest males of the species, however the smallest male will not be the fastest climber. This optimal body size for climbing is observed in different males from the same species express phenotypes, weapons such as chelicerae, teeth or even legs to fight off competition are used to fight off oncoming rivals, with larger bodied spiders contained larger chelicerae. In most cases body size correlated with mating success. This is observed in Lyssomanes viridis, whose males display weapons that are very pronounced in comparison with females and selected to help males fight off competition.

The time it takes to develop is crucial to the overall fitness of a spider. This idea is true, however does not mean that larger males will always have better fitness. In Latrodectus hasselti, larger males outcompete smaller males by getting to the females web first. However, these large male spiders have long development times, meaning that the larger male will need more time before being able to copulate. Smaller males tend to have a quick development time which gives them an advantage in mating with a female. This advantage correlates with high paternal success in the species Latrodectus hasselti. Larger males are able to outcompete smaller males, but not able to mate. Smaller males risk getting outcompeted, but are more likely to have paternal success.

== Sperm competition ==
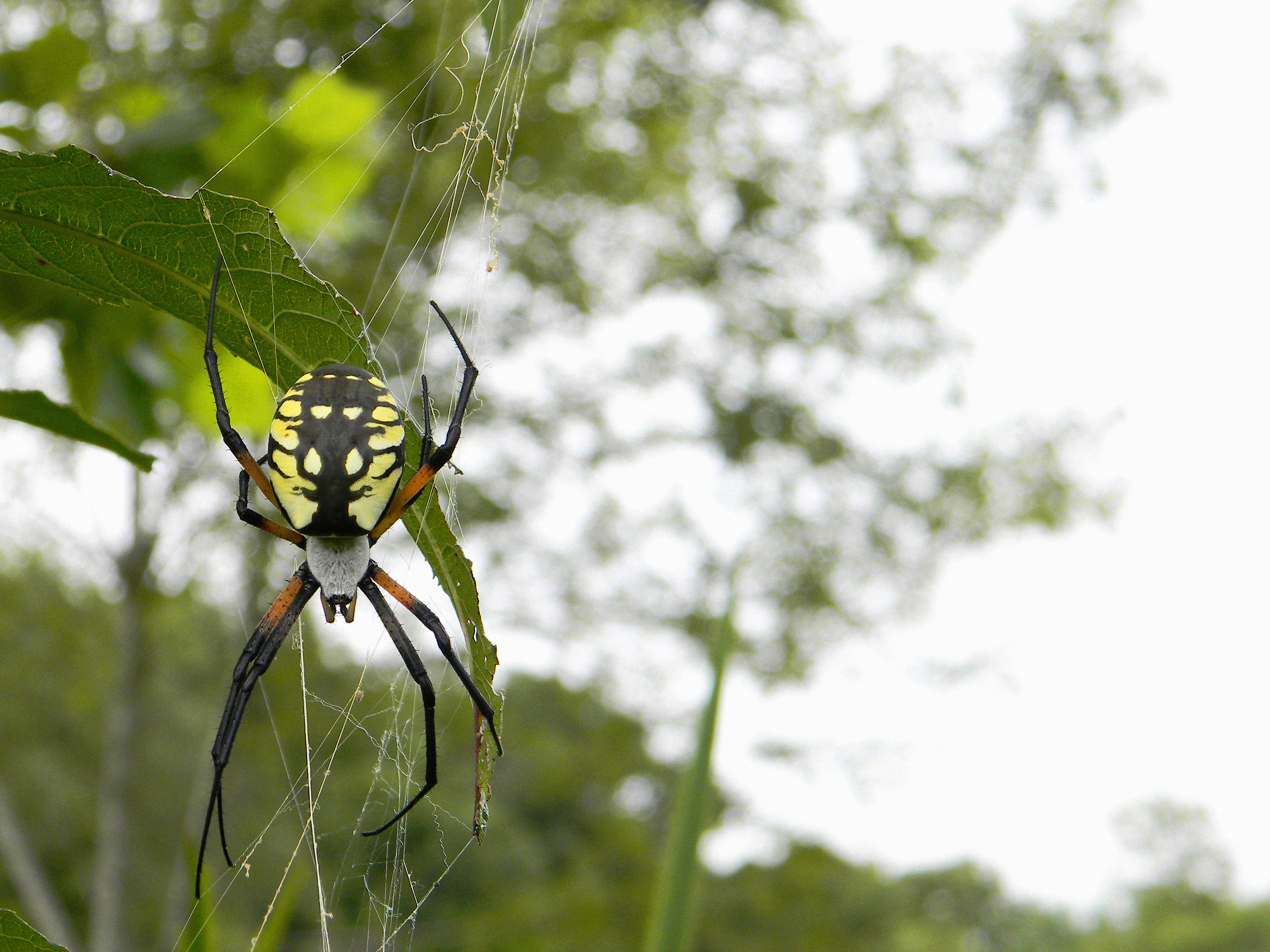
Argiope aurantia

Sperm competition occurs in many species, such as Unicorn catleyi, Nephila Pilipes and Argiope aurantia, with males acting to limit it by guarding the female or inserting parts of the male genitalia into the female's reproductive organs, or using mating plugs which come from the males seminal fluid. This process is observed in the species Unicorn catleyi, for example. In this species, males plug a female's insemination duct with a portion of their palp that contains the ejaculatory duct called the embolus. The embolus that is found in the female's posterior receptaculum suggests that males are trying to limit sperm competition.

In some spider species, such as the Nephila pilipes, multiple males try to mate with only one female. This can be harmful to the female, because it forces her to participate in energy costly matings. In response to this polyandry, the female produces mating plugs of her own to prevent too many males from copulating with her.

The mating plugs transferred to females by the males are believed to be a possible cause of monogyny. For example, in the spider species Argiope aurantia, males will sometimes plug a female with both pedipalps to prevent sperm competition. When this occurs, the male loses his ability to mate with more than one female.

== Mate choice ==
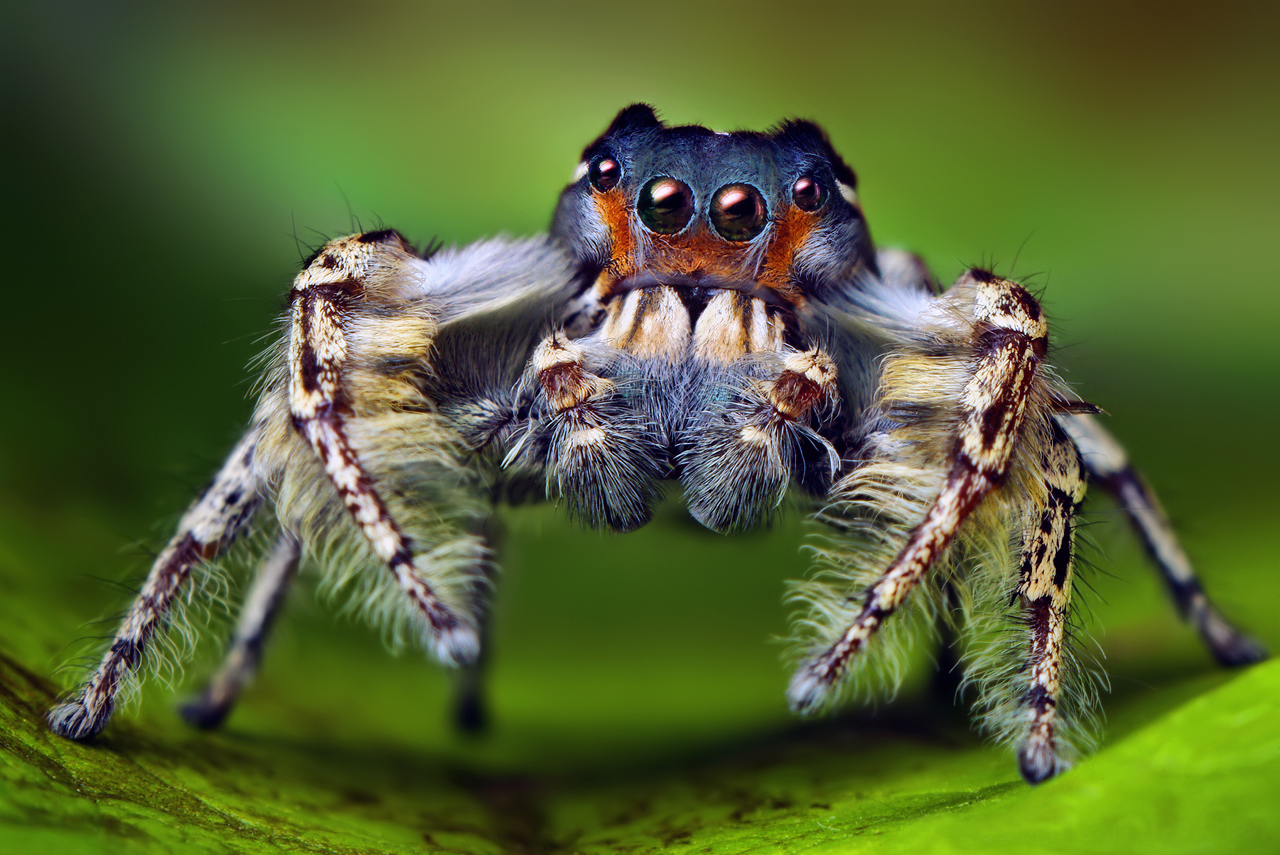
Phidippus putnami male

Mate choice is typically displayed by females, but males can be selective as well. Traits associated with winning competitive bouts are more likely to be chosen by females. As body size effects male-to-male competition, females will choose the male with the more efficient body size. Wolf spider, Schizocosa floridana, females assess males based on their ability to cope with a changing environment, observing the way males adapt to differences in food availabilities at different times. Males who are able to adapt to the changes in food availability are well conditioned and usually show courtship displays such as tapping on their forelegs and waving. females choose the males who express these courtship displays and are larger in size based on predictions of the males foraging past.

Courtship displays, such as degrees of ornamentation, colors, and movements, are commonly expressed in individuals of a species to attract the opposite sex. The male Hygrolycosa rubrofasciata spider displays certain signals, known as drumming, where a male taps his legs on a rough surface such as a leaf to signal he is ready to mate, with its speed influencing female choice towards faster drummers. Once the female chooses the male, her body starts to shake, a signal that she is ready to mate too. Males who exhibit better drumming behavior typically are more viable.

Schizocosa stridulans males have ornamentation traits in their forelegs which affect their mating success. When courtship rates are high, ornamentation does not increase the reproductive rates of males because of the correlation between the aggressiveness of a spider and the degrees of ornamentation. Due to this correlation, it is hypothesized that females choose males without ornamentation to avoid aggression from the males. Females are able to be selective when courtship rates are high, because they do not have to worry about missing out on copulations if there are plenty of male spiders to mate with. When courtship rates are low, males with high degrees of ornamentation are able to get to the female more quickly, thus giving them an advantage over non-ornamented males.

Sometimes facial color or leg brightness can play a role in mate choice. In several species of jumping spiders, including Habronattus pyrrithrix, and Cosmophasis umbratica, males show different brightness and color of body parts prior to copulation. These colors can be used to the males advantage in attracting a mate. In the species Habronattus pyrrithrix, the males who have faces that are red and non bright green legs are more likely to attract a mate than males who do not, indicating that females prefer males with those particular traits.

Although females from the species Hygrolycosa rubrofasciata, Schizocosa floridana and Schizocosa stridulans tend to be the more selective sex, it is not uncommon to observe males from different spider species such as the Zygiella x-notata and Latrodectus hesperus, to be selective as well. In the orb weaving spider Zygiella x-notata, reproduction rates are affected by male choice under different conditions. These external conditions depend on the amount of competition between males of the species. When competition rates are low, males mate opportunistically with as many females as possible. When competition between males is high, larger males choose to mate with a large female as opposed to the smaller males who choose to mate with any female. The belief is that the advantages of larger size in competition, will give the larger males an opportunity to increase their paternal success by allowing them to be more selective of females.

Sometimes males choose females who are large and better conditioned to avoid being eaten. Choosing a malnourished female can result in a male being cannibalized before copulation. Cannibalism by females is often expressed as a way for females to get nutrition from their mates after copulation. This cannibalistic behavior by females makes males more selective with whom to mate. The males from the species Latrodectus hesperus show high mate preference for better conditioned females. By choosing well nourished females, males are able to increase their mating success while limiting their chance of being consumed. This is because well nourished females are less likely to eat their mates than malnourished females.

=== Cryptic female choice ===
Cryptic female choice is a post-copulatory process of mate choice. This process is observed in numerous spider species such as Physocyclus globosus and Argiope bruennichi. For example, in the Argiope bruennichi species, males produce energetic courtship displays prior to copulation. Regardless of the displays, females are observed to mate with multiple males. Once copulation is over, the offspring of the female is more likely to have the courtship display phenotype than not. The females of this species must be cryptically discarding sperm from the non-courtship males while keeping the other males' sperm for copulation. This allows a female to mate with as many males as she wants prior to copulation, while being more selective of males after copulation. Discarding the sperm of a male who does not perform courtship displays indicates that females feel that males who perform courtship displays have the greatest fitness.
