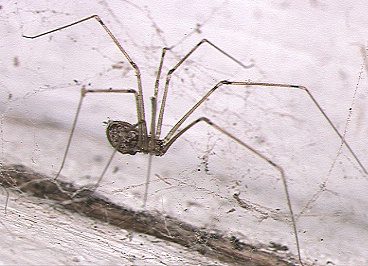
- Female Physocyclus globosus

Scientific classification
- Kingdom: Animalia
- Phylum: Arthropoda
- Subphylum: Chelicerata
- Class: Arachnida
- Order: Araneae
- Infraorder: Araneomorphae
- Family: Pholcidae
- Genus: Physocyclus; Simon, 1893

Type species
- P. globosus (Taczanowski, 1874)

Species
- 38, see text

= Physocyclus =

Genus of spiders

Physocyclus is a genus of cellar spiders that was first described by Eugène Louis Simon in 1893.

== Species ==
As of June 2022 it contains 38 species, found in South America, Asia, Central America, North America, Africa, Australia, Czechia, and on the Pacific Islands:

- Physocyclus bicornis Gertsch, 1971 – Mexico
- Physocyclus brevicornus Valdez-Mondragón, 2010 – Mexico
- Physocyclus californicus Chamberlin & Gertsch, 1929 – US, Mexico
- Physocyclus cornutus Banks, 1898 – Mexico
- Physocyclus darwini Valdez-Mondragón, 2010 – Mexico
- Physocyclus dugesi Simon, 1893 – Mexico to Venezuela
- Physocyclus enaulus Crosby, 1926 – US, Mexico
- Physocyclus franckei Valdez-Mondragón, 2010 – Mexico
- Physocyclus gertschi Valdez-Mondragón, 2010 – Mexico
- Physocyclus globosus (Taczanowski, 1874) (type) – North America. Introduced to Africa, Czechia, Iran, Sri Lanka, China, Japan, Philippines, Indonesia, Australia, Pacific islands
- Physocyclus guanacaste Huber, 1998 – Costa Rica, Honduras
- Physocyclus hoogstraali Gertsch & Davis, 1942 – US, Mexico
- Physocyclus huacana Valdez-Mondragón, 2010 – Mexico
- Physocyclus lautus Gertsch, 1971 – Mexico
- Physocyclus lyncis (Nolasco & Valdez-Mondragón, 2022) – Mexico
- Physocyclus mariachi (Nolasco & Valdez-Mondragón, 2022) – Mexico
- Physocyclus marialuisae Valdez-Mondragón, 2010 – Mexico
- Physocyclus merus Gertsch, 1971 – Mexico
- Physocyclus mexicanus Banks, 1898 – Mexico
- Physocyclus michoacanus Valdez-Mondragón, 2010 – Mexico
- Physocyclus modestus Gertsch, 1971 – Mexico
- Physocyclus montanoi Valdez-Mondragón, 2010 – Mexico
- Physocyclus mysticus Chamberlin, 1924 – Mexico
- Physocyclus palmarus Jiménez & Palacios-Cardiel, 2013 – Mexico
- Physocyclus paredesi Valdez-Mondragón, 2010 – Mexico
- Physocyclus pedregosus Gertsch, 1971 – Mexico
- Physocyclus peribanensis Valdez-Mondragón, 2014 – Mexico
- Physocyclus platnicki Valdez-Mondragón, 2010 – Mexico
- Physocyclus pocamadre (Nolasco & Valdez-Mondragón, 2022) – Mexico
- Physocyclus reddelli Gertsch, 1971 – Mexico
- Physocyclus rothi Valdez-Mondragón, 2010 – Mexico
- Physocyclus sarae Valdez-Mondragón, 2010 – Mexico
- Physocyclus sikuapu (Nolasco & Valdez-Mondragón, 2022) – Mexico
- Physocyclus sprousei Valdez-Mondragón, 2010 – Mexico
- Physocyclus tanneri Chamberlin, 1921 – USA, Mexico
- Physocyclus validus Gertsch, 1971 – Mexico
- Physocyclus viridis Mello-Leitão, 1940 – Brazil
- Physocyclus xerophilus (Nolasco & Valdez-Mondragón, 2020) – Mexico

== See also ==
- List of Pholcidae species
