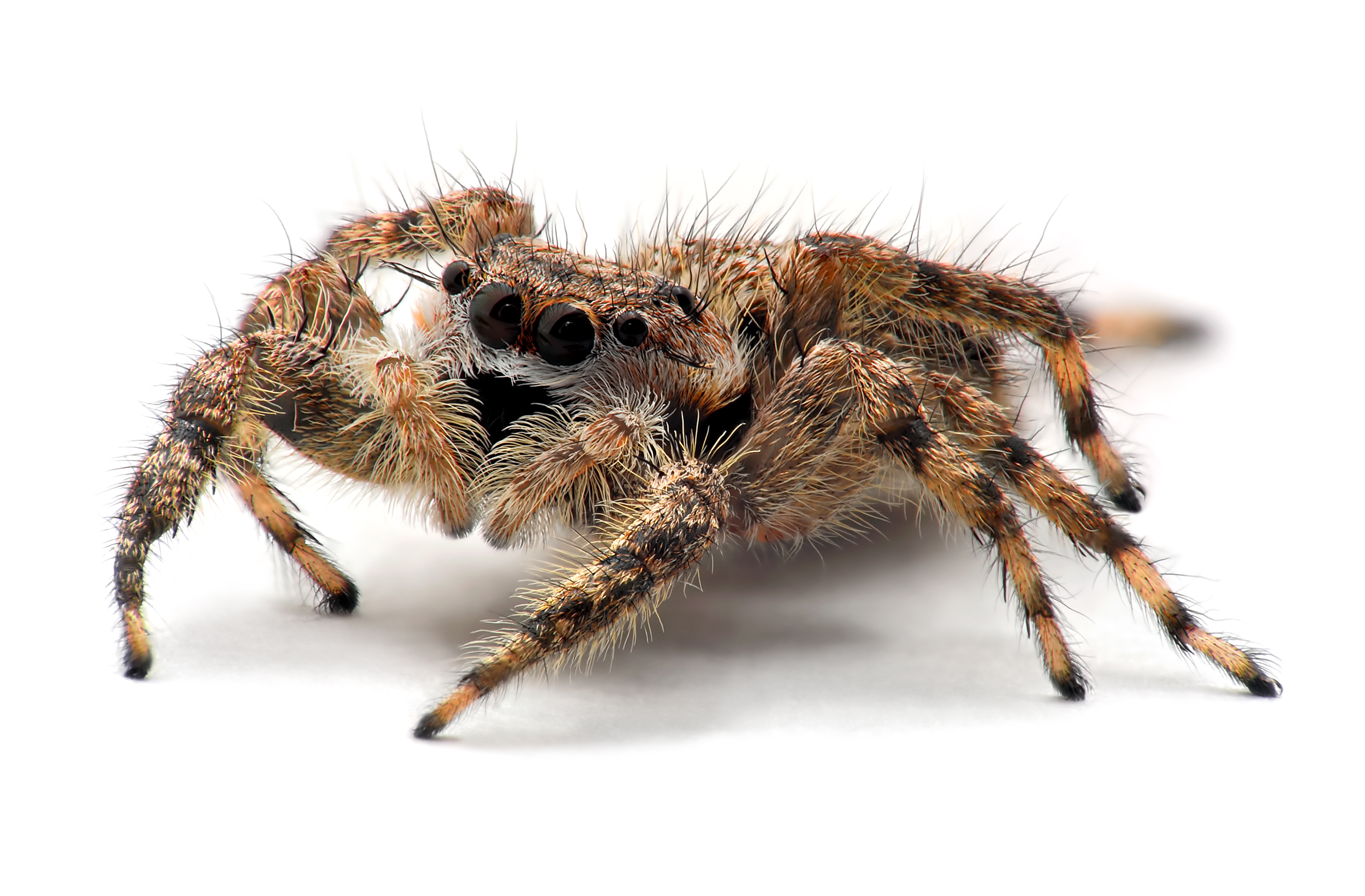
- Adult female Platycryptus undatus

Scientific classification
- Kingdom: Animalia
- Phylum: Arthropoda
- Subphylum: Chelicerata
- Class: Arachnida
- Order: Araneae
- Infraorder: Araneomorphae
- Clade: RTA clade
- Family: Salticidae; Blackwall, 1841

Genera
- See List of Salticidae genera.

Diversity
- 695 genera, 6,950 species
- blue: reported countries (WSC) green: observation hotspots (iNaturalist)

= Jumping spider =

Jumping spiders Temporal range: Eocene to Present, 54–0 Ma Possible Paleocene record

Family of spiders

Jumping spiders are spiders in the family Salticidae, with almost 700 genera and around 7,000 described species, making it the largest family of spiders – comprising 13% of spider species. Jumping spiders have some of the best vision among arthropods – being capable of stereoptic color vision – and use sight in courtship, hunting, and navigation.

Although they normally move unobtrusively and fairly slowly, most species are capable of very agile jumps, notably when hunting, but sometimes in response to sudden threats or crossing long gaps. Both their book lungs and tracheal system are well-developed, and they use both systems (bimodal breathing). Jumping spiders are generally recognized by their eye pattern. All jumping spiders have four pairs of eyes, with the anterior median pair (the two front middle eyes) being particularly large.

== Description ==
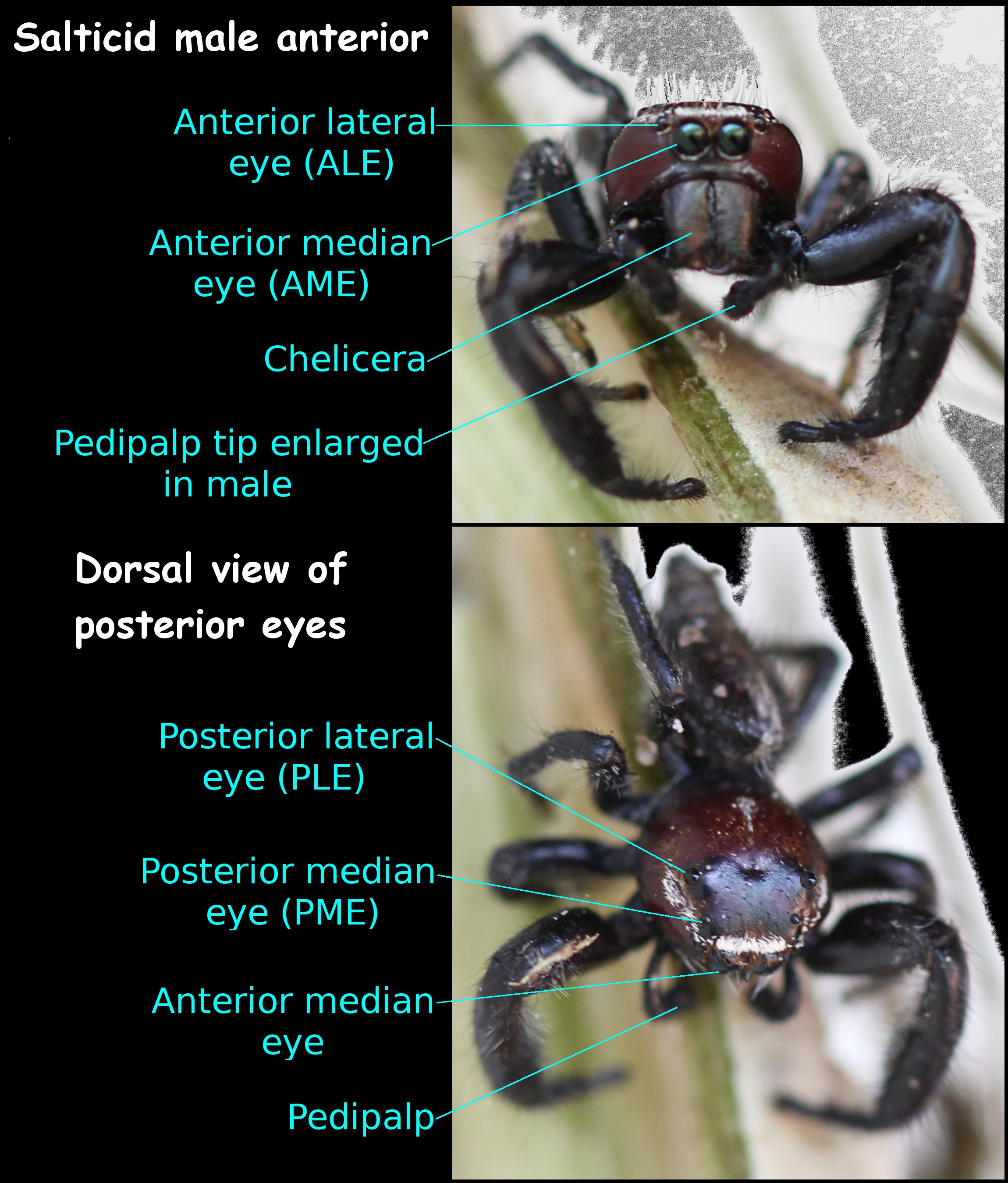
Salticidae male anterior and dorsal aspects, showing positions of eyes

A regal jumper staying near its shelter on a thistle. It attempts to capture a small winged insect.

Jumping spiders are among the easiest to distinguish from similar spider families because of the shape of the cephalothorax and their eye patterns. The families closest to Salticidae in general appearance are the Corinnidae (distinguished also by prominent spines on the back four legs), the Oxyopidae (the lynx spiders, distinguished by very prominent spines on all legs), and the Thomisidae (the crab spiders, distinguished by their front four legs, which are very long and powerful). None of these families, however, have eyes that resemble those of the Salticidae. Conversely, the legs of jumping spiders are not covered with any very prominent spines. Their front four legs generally are larger than the hind four, but not as dramatically so as those of the crab spiders, nor are they held in the outstretched-arms attitude characteristic of the Thomisidae. In spite of the length of their front legs, Salticidae depend on their rear legs for jumping. The generally larger front legs are used partly to assist in grasping prey, and in some species, the front legs and pedipalps are used in species-recognition signaling.

The jumping spiders, unlike the other families, have faces that are roughly rectangular surfaces perpendicular to their direction of motion. In effect this means that their forward-looking, anterior eyes are on "flat faces". Their eye pattern is the clearest single identifying characteristic. They have eight eyes. Most diagnostic are the front row of four eyes, in which the anterior median pair are more dramatically prominent than any other spider eyes apart from the posterior median eyes of the Deinopidae. There is, however, a radical functional difference between the major (anterior median) eyes of Salticidae and the major (posterior median) eyes of the Deinopidae; the large posterior eyes of Deinopidae are adapted mainly to vision in dim light, whereas the large anterior eyes of Salticidae are adapted to detailed, three-dimensional vision for purposes of estimating the range, direction, and nature of potential prey, permitting the spider to direct its attacking leaps with great precision. The anterior lateral eyes, though large, are smaller than the anterior median eyes and provide a wider forward field of vision.

The rear row of four eyes may be described as strongly bent, or as being rearranged into two rows, with two large posterior lateral eyes being the furthest back. They serve for lateral vision. The posterior median eyes also have been shifted out laterally, almost as far as the posterior lateral eyes. They are usually much smaller than the posterior lateral eyes and there is doubt about whether they are at all functional in many species.

The body length of jumping spiders generally ranges from 1 to 25 mm (0.04–0.98 in). The largest is Hyllus giganteus, while other genera with relatively large species include Phidippus, Philaeus and Plexippus.

In addition to using their silk for safety lines while jumping, they also build silken "pup tents", where they take shelter from bad weather and sleep at night. They molt in these shelters, build and store egg cases in them, and also spend the winter in them.

Their body's sensory hairs are able to detect airborne acoustic stimuli up to 3 m away.

== Vision ==
The visual fields of a jumping spider

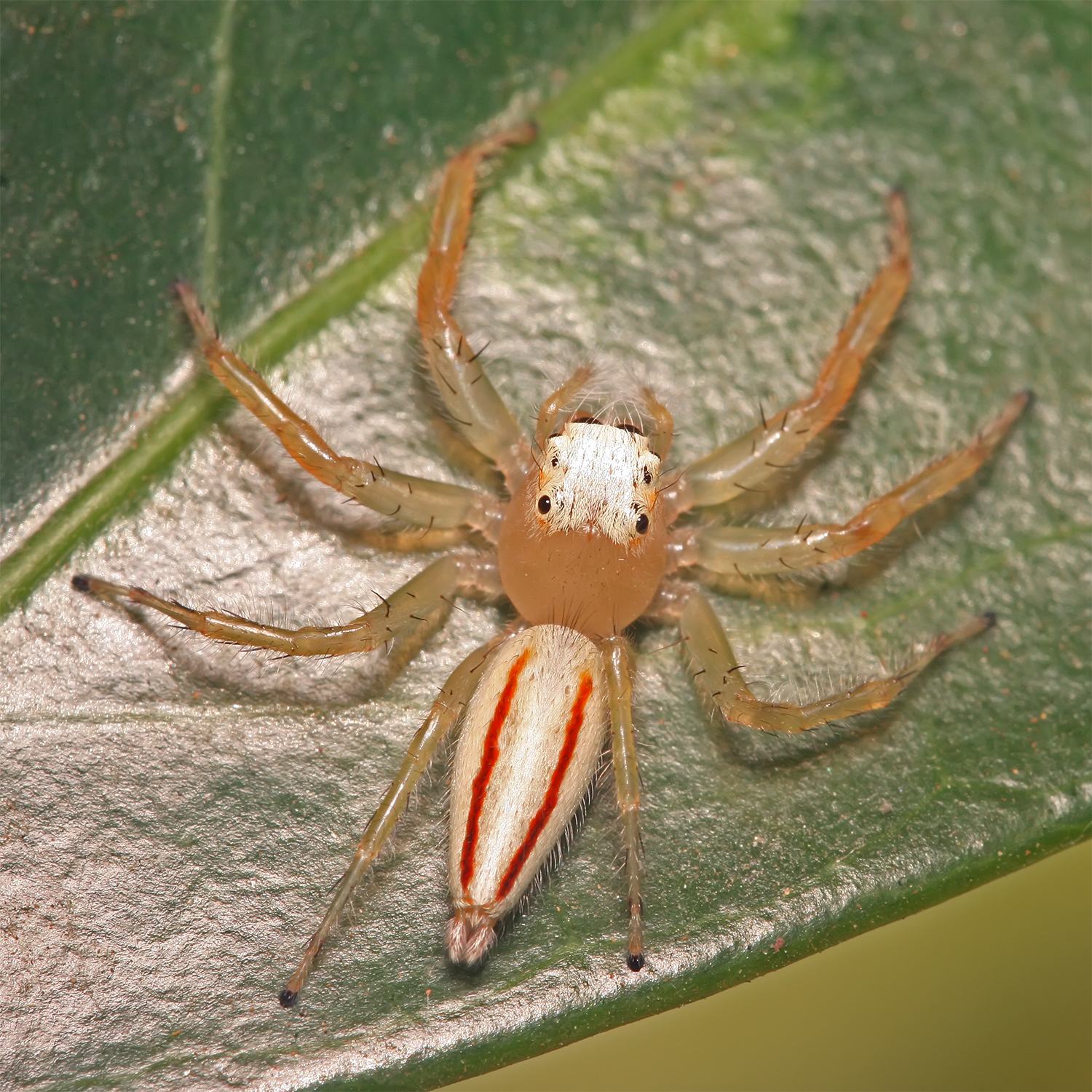
The eight eyes of a Telamonia dimidiata located near the front

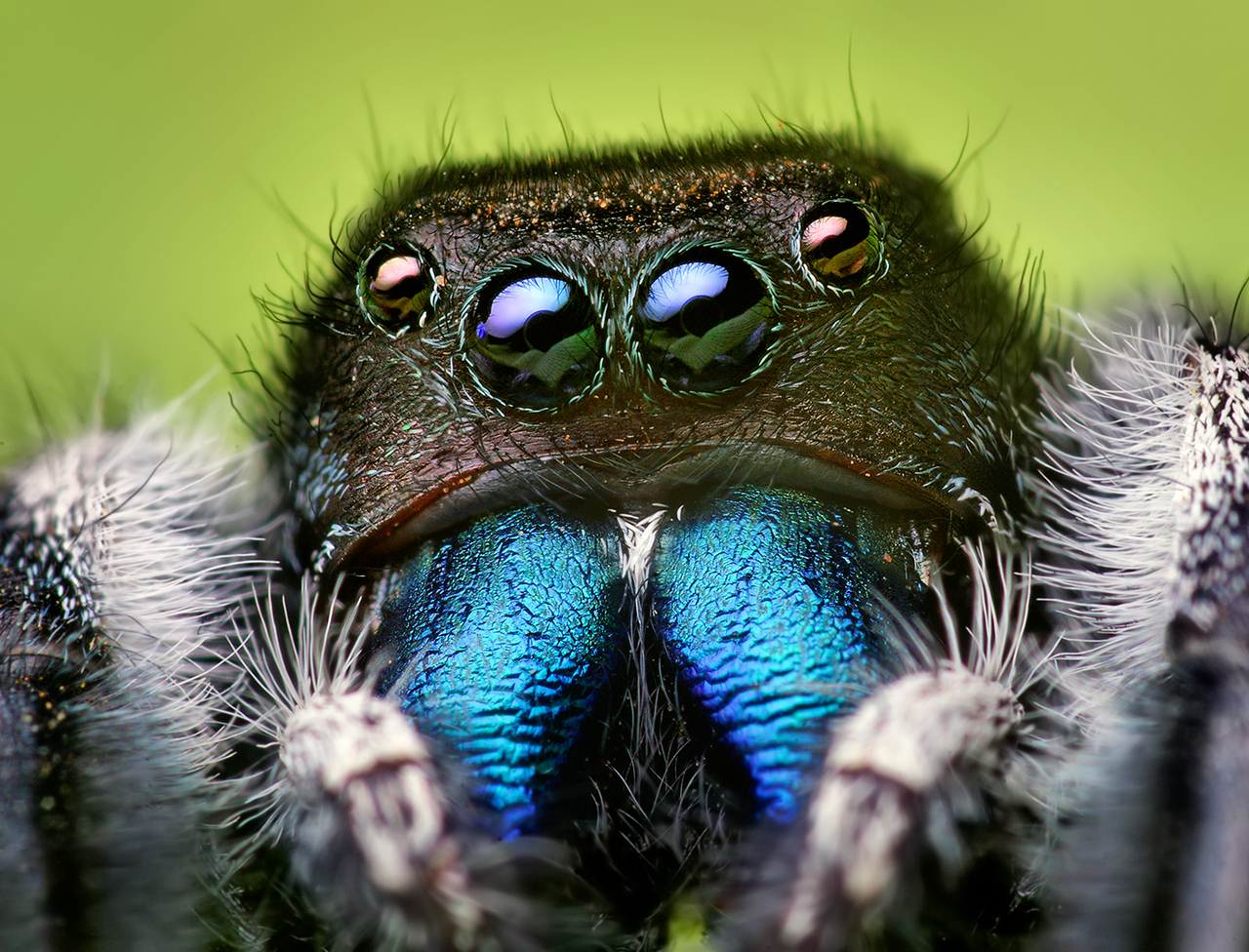
Adult male Phidippus audax

Jumping spiders have four pairs of eyes; three secondary pairs that are fixed and a principal pair that is internally adaptable.

The posterior median eyes are vestigial in many species, but in some primitive subfamilies, they are comparable in size with the other secondary eyes and help to detect motion. While unable to form images, the reduced pair of eyes is thought to have a role similar to that of insect ocelli by receiving light from the sky. The photoreceptors in the other secondary pairs are almost exclusively green-sensitive, but the posterior median eyes have two visual opsins different from those in all the other eyes, sensitive to blue and UV light.

The posterior lateral eyes (PLEs) are wide-angle motion detectors that sense motions from the side and behind. Combined with the other eyes, PLEs give the spider a near 360° view of the world.

The anterior lateral eyes (ALEs) have the best visual acuity of the secondary eyes. They are able to distinguish some details, as well, and without them, no "looming response" (instinctive rapid defensive action) can be triggered by motion. Even with all the other pairs covered, jumping spiders in a study could still detect, stalk, and attack flies, using their ALEs only, which are also sufficiently widely spaced to provide stereoscopic vision.

The anterior median eyes have very good vision. This pair of eyes is built like a telescopic tube with a corneal lens in the front and a second lens in the back that focus images onto a four-layered retina, a narrow, boomerang-shaped strip oriented vertically. Physiological experiments have shown they may have up to four different kinds of receptor cells, with different absorption spectra, giving them the possibility of tetrachromatic color vision, with sensitivity extending into the ultraviolet (UV) range. As the eyes are too close together to allow depth perception, and the animals do not make use of motion parallax, they have instead evolved a method called image defocus. Of the four photoreceptor layers in the retina, the two closest to the surface contain a UV-sensitive opsin (visual pigment), while the two deepest contain a green-sensitive opsin. The incoming green light is only focused on the deepest layer, while the other one receives defocused or fuzzy images. By measuring the amount of defocus from the fuzzy layer, calculating the distance to the objects in front of them is possible. In addition to receptor cells, red filters also have been detected, located in front of the cells that normally register green light. All salticids, regardless of whether they have two, three, or four kinds of color receptors, seemingly are highly sensitive to UV light. Some species (such as Cosmophasis umbratica) are highly dimorphic in the UV spectrum, suggesting a role in sexual signaling. Color discrimination has been demonstrated in behavioral experiments.

The anterior median eyes have high resolution (11 min visual angle), but the field of vision is narrow, from 2 to 5°. The central region of the retina, where acuity is highest, is no more than six or seven receptor rows wide. However, the eye can scan objects off the direct axis of vision. As the lens is attached to the carapace, the eye's scanning movements are restricted to its retina through a complicated pattern of translations and rotations. This dynamic adjustment is a means of compensation for the narrowness of the static field of vision. Movement of the retina in jumping spiders is analogous to the way many vertebrates, such as primates, move their entire eyes to focus images of interest onto their fovea centralis. In jumping spiders with a translucent carapace, such movements within the jumping spider's eyes are visible from outside when the attention of the spider is directed to various targets.

== Behavior ==
=== Jumping ===
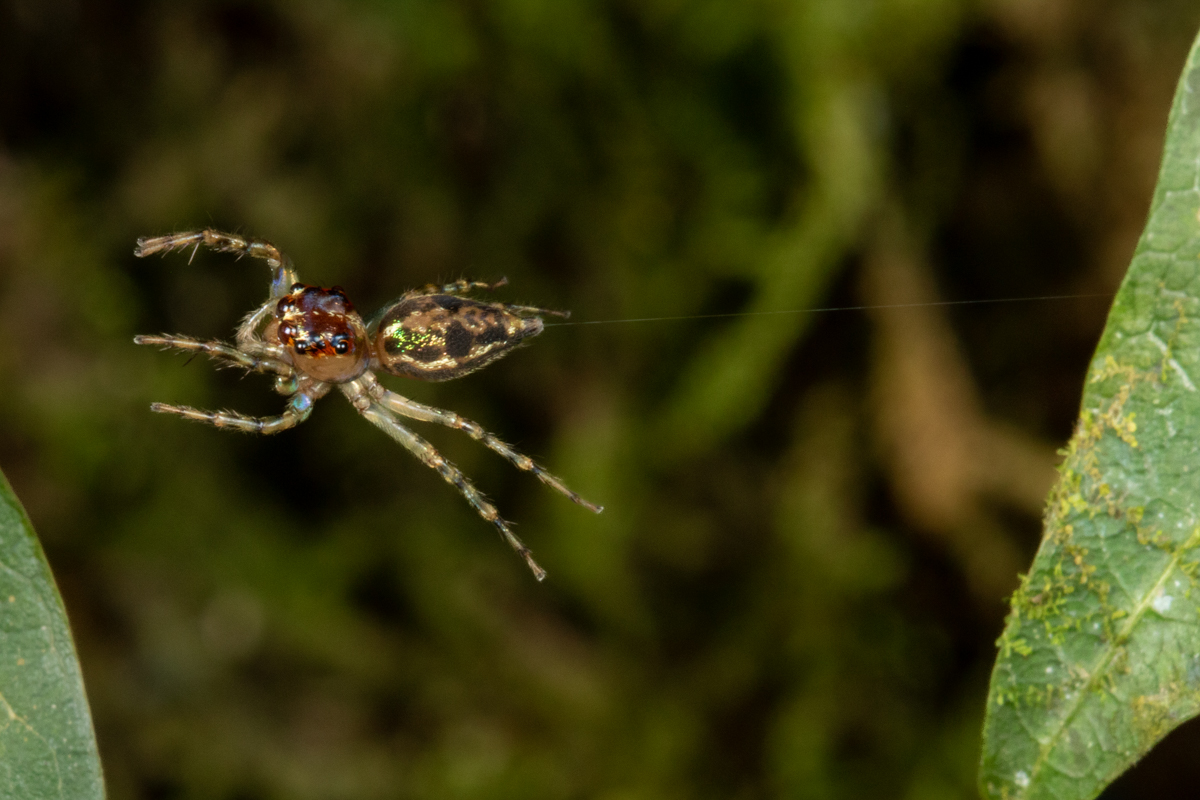
Unidentified salticid jumping with trailing dragline

Many other arthropods are known to jump, including grasshoppers, fleas, leafhoppers, and sand fleas. Jumping spiders are different from these animals because they are able to make accurate, targeted jumps. Jumps are used for navigation, to escape danger, and to catch prey. When jumping, they use mainly their third or fourth pair of legs, or both pairs, depending on species. Jumping spiders' well-developed internal hydraulic system extends their limbs by altering the pressure of their body fluid (hemolymph) within them. This enables the spiders to jump without having large muscular legs like a grasshopper. The maximum horizontal jump distance varies greatly between species, with some capable of jumping two or three body lengths, while the jump of an individual Colonus puerperus was measured at 38 times the body length. The accuracy of their jumps is mediated by their well-developed visual system and the ability to quickly process visual information to tailor each jump. When a jumping spider moves from place to place, and especially just before it jumps, it tethers a filament of silk (or 'dragline') to whatever it is standing on. This dragline provides a mechanical aid to jumping, including braking and stabilization and if the jump should fail, the spider climbs back up the dragline.

=== Hunting ===
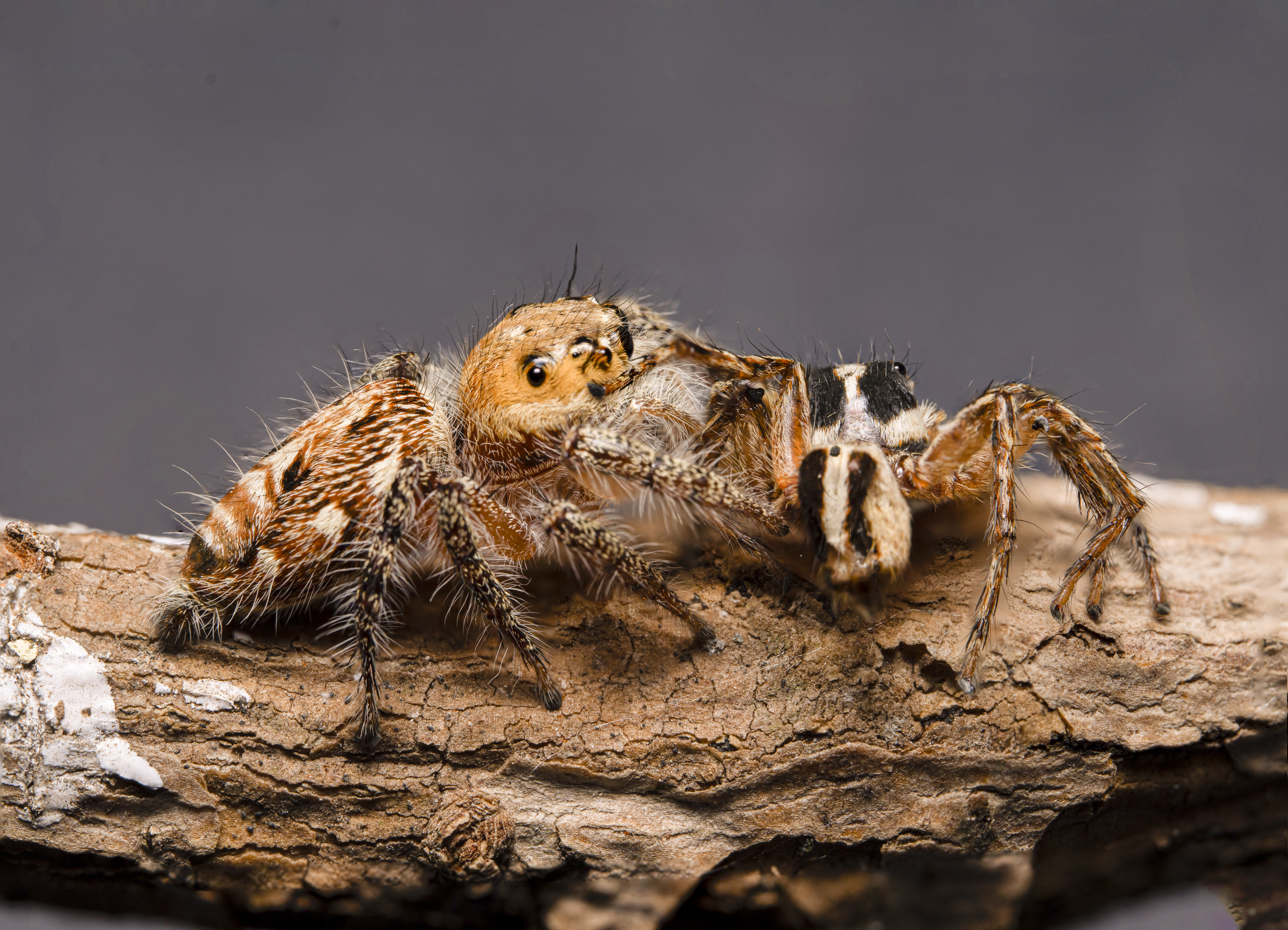
Heavy-bodied jumper eating a Pantropical jumper

The hunting behaviour of the Salticidae is confusingly varied compared to that of most spiders in other families. Salticids hunt diurnally as a rule, which is consistent with their highly developed visual system. When it detects potential prey, a jumping spider typically begins orienting itself by swiveling its cephalothorax to bring the anterior median eyes to bear. It then moves its abdomen in line with its cephalothorax. After that, it might spend some time inspecting the object of its attention and determining whether a camouflaged or doubtful item of prey is promising, before it starts to stalk slowly forward. When close enough, the spider pauses to attach a dragline, then springs onto the prey.

Many variations on the theme and many surprising aspects exist. For one, salticids do not necessarily follow a straight path in approaching prey. They may follow a circuitous course, sometimes even a course that takes the hunter through regions from which the prey is not visible. Such complex adaptive behaviour is hard to reconcile with an organism that has such a tiny brain. Some jumping spiders, in particular some species of Portia, can negotiate long detours from one bush down to the ground, then up the stem of another bush to capture a prey item on a particular leaf. Such behaviour is the subject of research.

Some salticid species are continually on the move, stopping periodically to look around for prey, which they then stalk immediately. Others spend more time scanning their surroundings from one position, actively stalking any prey they detect. Members of the genus Phaeacius take that strategy to extremes; they sit on a tree trunk, facing downwards and rarely do any stalking, but simply lunge down on any prey items that pass close before them.

Some Salticidae specialise in particular classes of prey, such as ants. Most spiders, including most salticids, avoid worker ants, but several species not only eat them as a primary item in their diets, but also employ specialised attack techniques. Anasaitis canosa circles around to the front of the ant and grabs it over the back of its head. Such myrmecophagous species, however, do not necessarily refuse other prey items, and routinely catch flies and similar prey in the usual salticid fashion, without the special precautions they apply in hunting dangerous prey such as ants. Ants offer the advantages of being plentiful prey items for which little competition from other predators occurs, but catching less hazardous prey when it presents itself remains profitable.

Some of the most surprising hunting behaviours occur among the araneophagous Salticidae, and vary greatly in method. Many of the spider-hunting species quite commonly attack other spiders, whether fellow salticids or not, in the same way as any other prey, but some kinds resort to web invasion. Nonspecialists such as Phidippus audax sometimes attack prey ensnared in webs, basically in acts of kleptoparasitism; sometimes they leap onto and eat the web occupant itself, or simply walk over the web for that purpose.

Salticidae in the genera Brettus, Cyrba, Gelotia and Portia display more advanced web-invasion behavior. They slowly advance onto the web and vibrate the silk with their pedipalps and legs. In this respect, their behaviour resembles that of the Mimetidae, probably the most specialised of the araneophagous spider families. If the web occupant approaches in the manner appropriate to dealing with ensnared prey, the predator attacks.

The foregoing examples present the Salticidae as textbook examples of active hunters; they would hardly seem likely to build webs other than those used in reproductive activities, and in fact, most species really do not build webs to catch prey. However, exceptions occur, though even those that do build capture webs generally also go hunting like other salticids. Some Portia species, for example, spin capture webs that are functional, though not as impressive as some orb webs of the Araneidae. Portia webs are of an unusual funnel shape and apparently adapted to the capture of other spiders. Spartaeus species, though, largely capture moths in their webs. In their review of the ethology of the Salticidae, Richman and Jackson speculate on whether such web building is a relic of the evolution of this family from web-building ancestors. Their tendency towards being active hunters poses a risk in relation to spider-pathogenic fungi, especially in the Tropics, Subtropics, and North America. This is because spider-pathogenic fungi tend to infect spiders that move around a lot.

In hunting, the Salticidae also use their silk as a tether to enable them to reach prey that otherwise would be inaccessible. For example, by advancing towards the prey to less than the jumping distance, then retreating and leaping in an arc at the end of the tether line, many species can leap onto prey on vertical or even inverted surfaces, which of course would not be possible without such a tether.

Having made contact with the prey, hunting Salticidae administer a bite to inject rapid-acting venom that gives the victim little time to react. In this respect, they resemble the Mimetidae and Thomisidae, families that ambush prey that often are larger than the predator, and they do so without securing the victim with silk. Consequently they must immobilise it immediately and their venom is adapted accordingly.

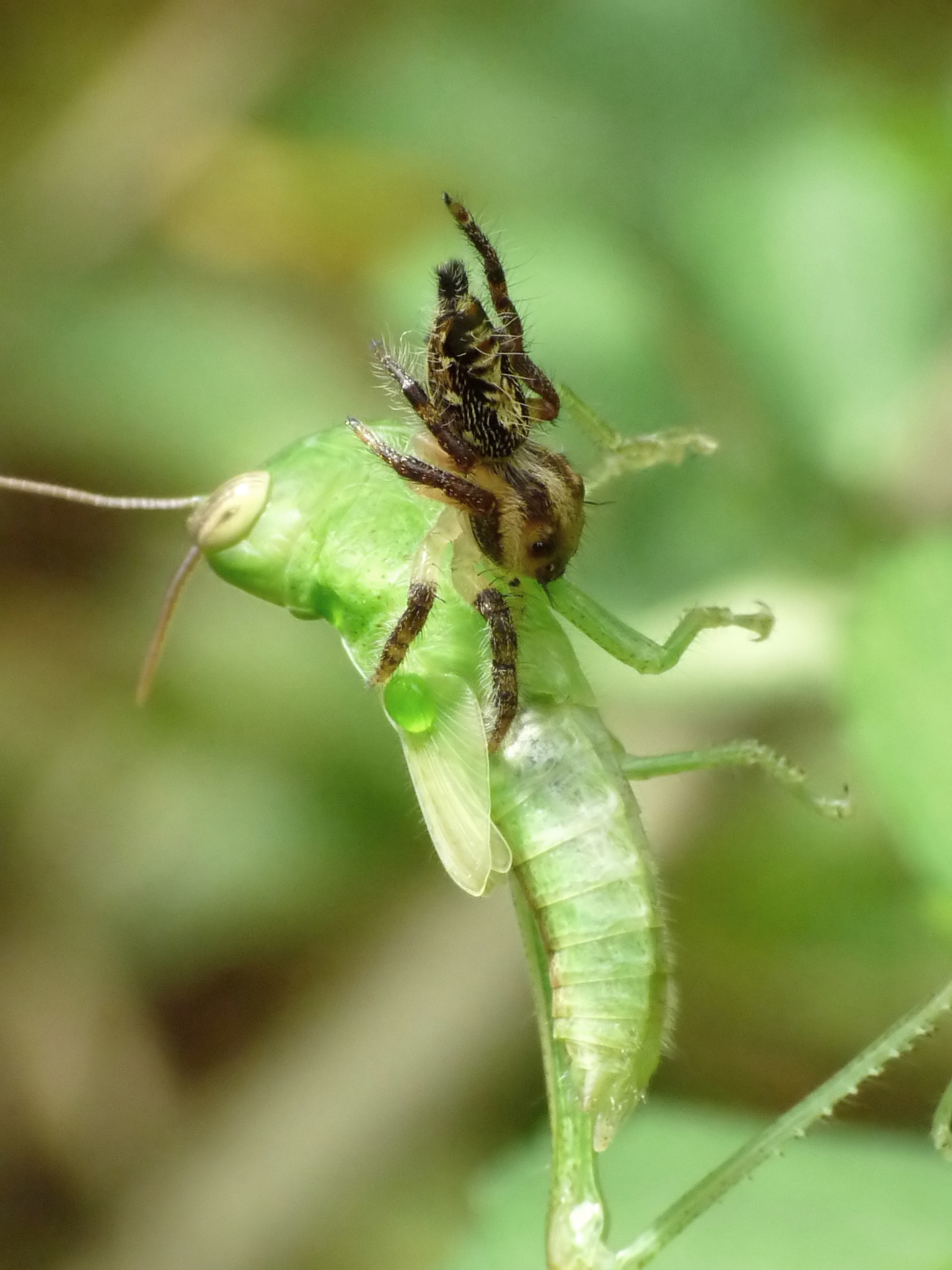
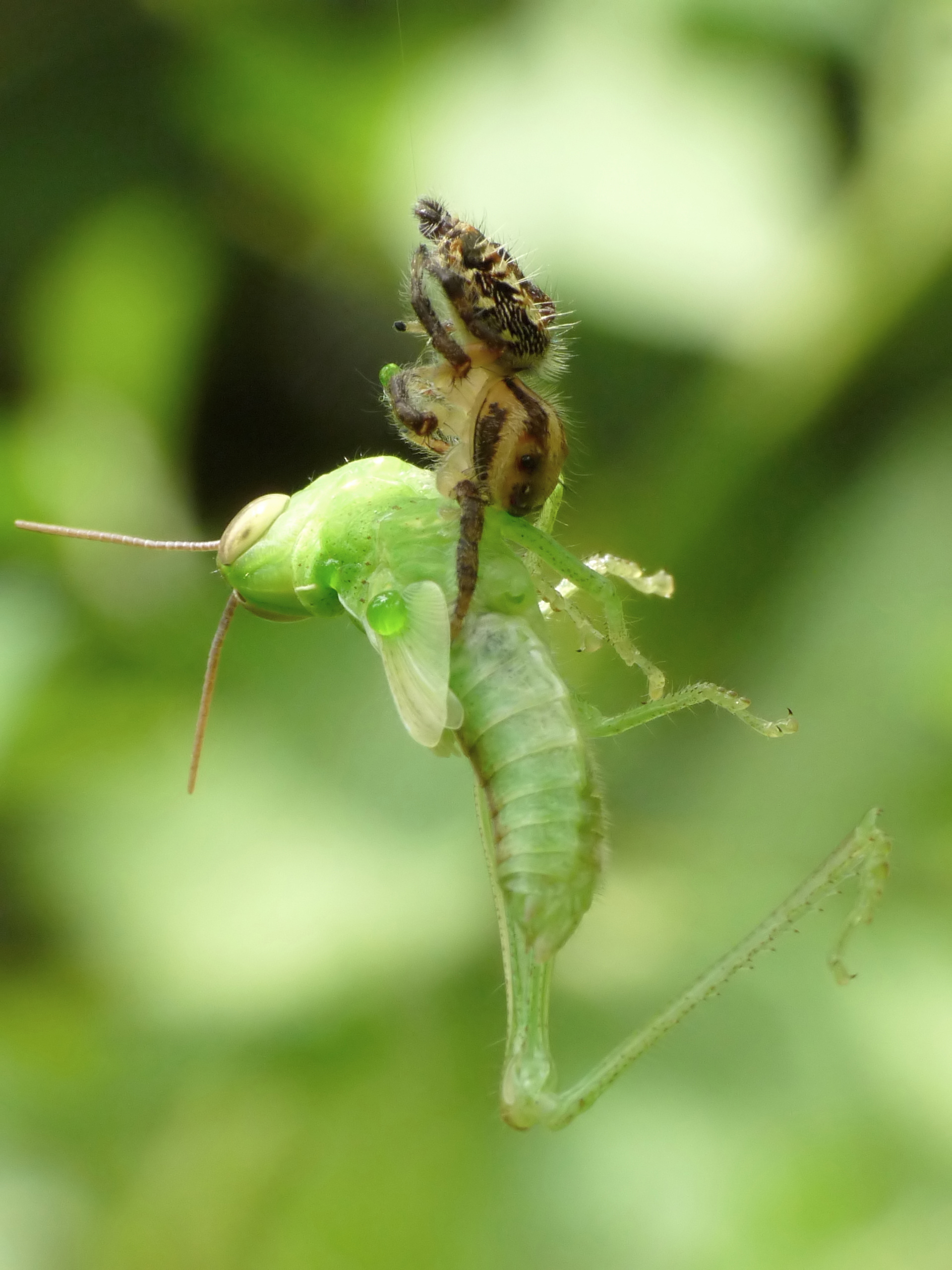
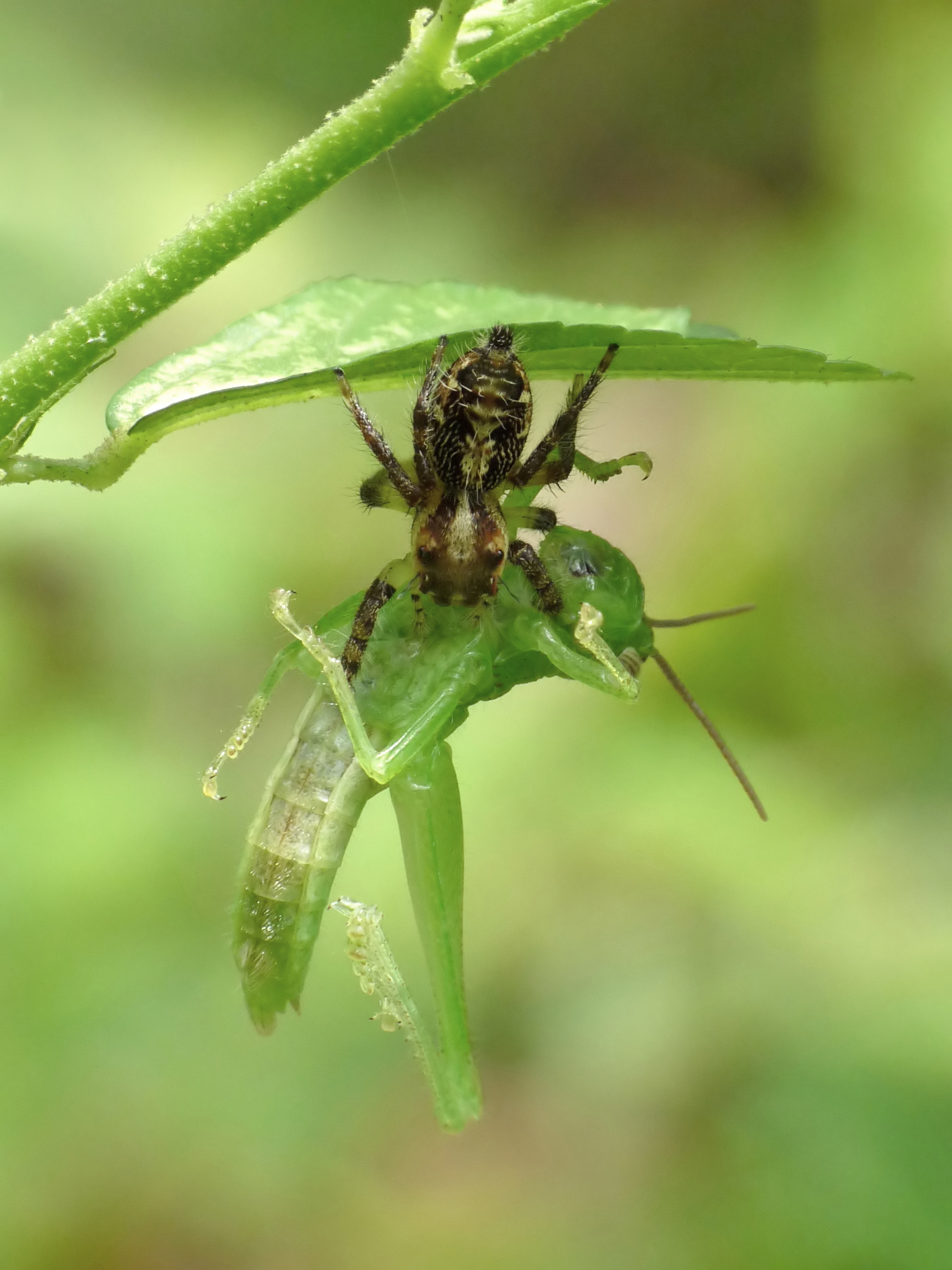
This small female jumping spider (Hyllus semicupreus) successfully captured a grasshopper that is much larger and stronger than she is. The grasshopper tried to escape, but the spider immobilized it using the venom she injected, and the "dragline" helped her hold her position with respect to the prey object.

=== Sleeping ===
While jumping spiders sleep, they experience similar characteristics of REM sleep. Such characteristics are curled legs with occasional twitching and movement of the eyes. Retinal movements often accompanied body movements, such as twitching.

== Diet ==
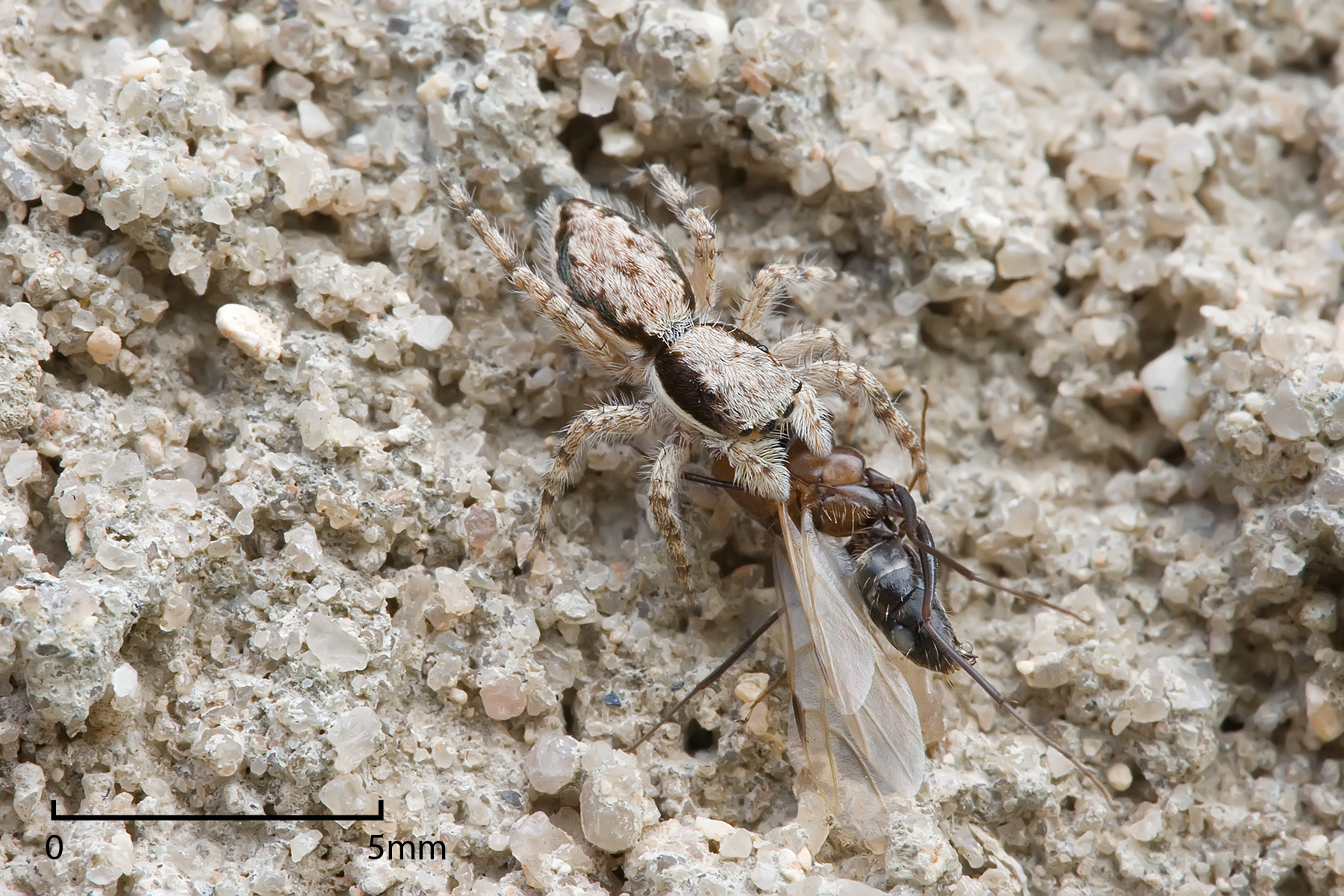
A camouflaged Menemerus bivittatus jumping spider with a captured male ant

Although jumping spiders are generally carnivorous, many species have been known to include nectar in their diets. One species, Bagheera kiplingi, feeds primarily on Beltian bodies, specialized structures rich in fat and protein, found on some acacia (Vachellia) species. None are known to feed on seeds or fruit. Extrafloral nectaries on plants, such as Chamaecrista fasciculata (partridge pea), provide jumping spiders with nectar; the plant benefits accordingly when the spiders prey on whatever pests they find.

The female of the Southeast Asian species Toxeus magnus feeds its offspring with a milky, nutritious fluid for the first 40 days of their lives.

== Reproduction ==
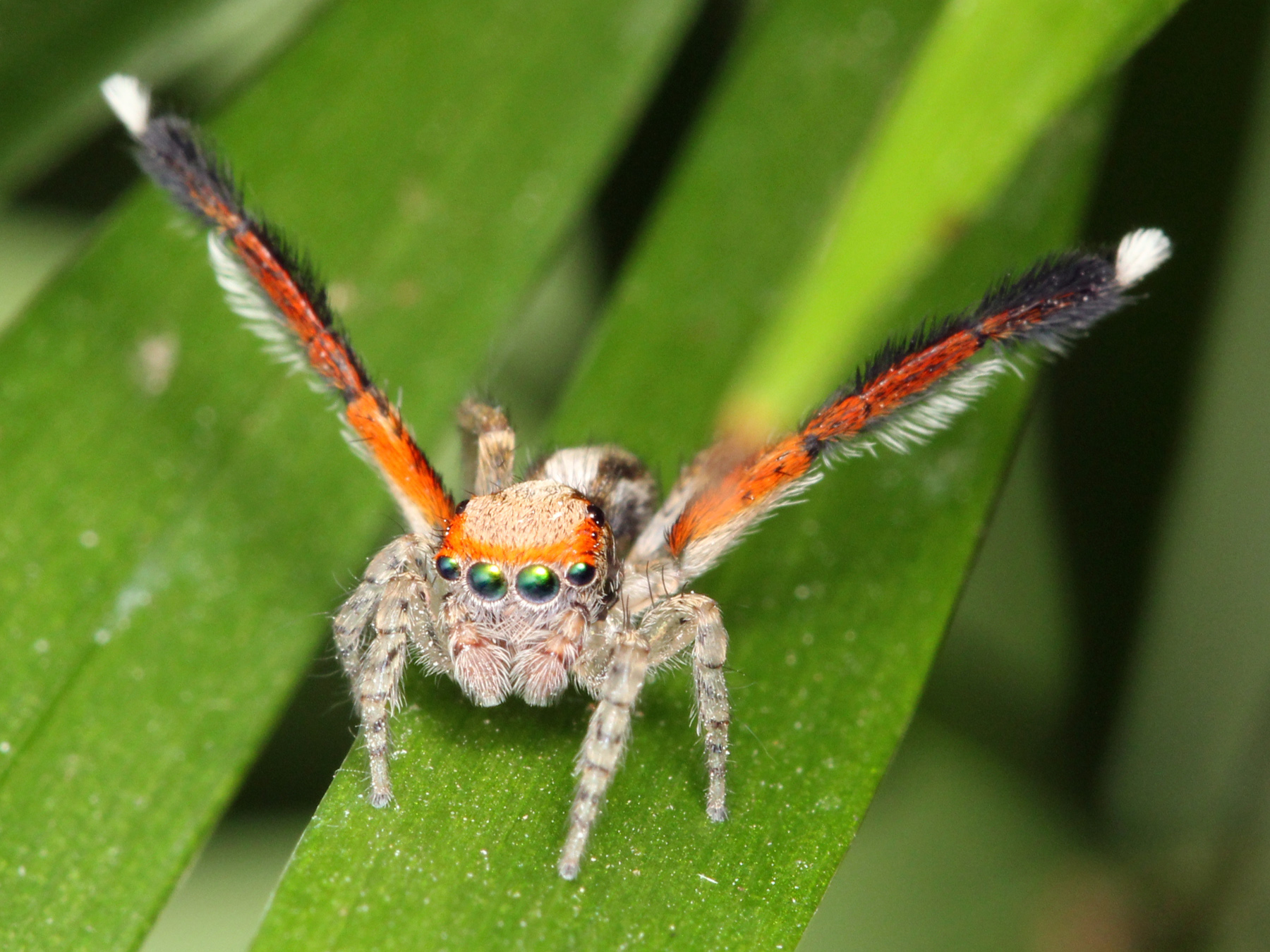
Courtship display of Saitis barbipes jumping spider

=== Courtship and mating behavior ===
Jumping spiders conduct complex, visual courtship displays using movements and physical bodily attributes. A form of sexual dimorphism, the males possess plumose hairs, colored or iridescent hairs (particularly pronounced in the peacock spiders), front leg fringes, structures on other legs, and other, often bizarre, modifications. These characteristics are used in a courtship "dance" in which the colored or iridescent parts of the body are displayed. In addition to displaying colors, jumping spiders perform complex sliding, vibrational, or zigzag movements to attract females. Many males have auditory signals, as well. These amplified sounds presented to the females resemble buzzes or drum rolls. Species vary significantly in visual and vibratory components of courtship. The ability to sense UV light (see Vision section) is used by at least one species, Cosmophasis umbratica, in courtship behavior. Cosmophasis umbratica males have markings that are only visible in UV and the females use the markings for mate choice.

If receptive to the male, the female assumes a passive, crouching position. In some species, the female may vibrate her palps or abdomen. The male then extends his front legs towards the female to touch her. If the female remains receptive, the male climbs on her back and inseminates her with his palps.

=== Consequences of sexual dimorphism ===
Maintaining colorful ornamentation may seem strictly beneficial to sexual selection, yet costs to maintain such distinguishing characteristics occur. While colorful or UV-reflecting individuals may attract more female spiders, it can also increase the risk of predation.

== Taxonomy ==
Classification within the spiders (Araneae)

- - Mygalomorphae
  - Araneomorphae
    - Synspermiata
    - Palpimanoidea
    - Entelegynae
      - Araneoidea
      - Eresidae
      - Titanoecidae
      - RTA clade
        - Zodariidae
        - Sparassidae
        - Lycosidae
        - Dionycha
          - Clubionidae
          - Gnaphosidae
          - Corinnidae
          - Philodromidae
          - Salticidae

The monophyly of the family Salticidae is well established through both phylogenetic and morphological analyses. The sister group to Salticidae is the family Philodromidae. Synapomorphies of the two families include loss of cylindrical gland spigots and loss of tapeta in the indirect eyes.

A 2015 revision of the Salticidae family divided it into seven subfamilies:

- Onomastinae Maddison, 2015 – 1 extant genus
- Asemoneinae Maddison, 2015 – 4 extant genera (Hindumanes, originally placed here, was moved to Lyssomaninae)
- Lyssomaninae Blackwall, 1877 – 4 extant genera (including Hindumanes)
- Spartaeinae Wanless, 1984 – 29 extant genera in 3 tribes
- Eupoinae Maddison, 2015 – 3 extant genera
- Hisponinae Simon, 1901 – 6 extant genera
- Salticinae Blackwall, 1841 – about 540 extant genera in 27 tribes

The relationships between these subfamilies is still up for debate. Below are the results of a 2017 phylogenomic study that attempted to resolve this question. The subfamily Eupoinae was unevaluated and its exact position is unclear.

- Salticidae
  - Eupoinae
  - - Spartaeinae
    - - Asemoneinae
      - Lyssomaninae
  - - Onomastinae
    - - Hisponinae
      - Salticinae

== Habitat ==
Diamorphic jumping spider in family Salticidae on tree trunk.

Jumping spiders live in a variety of habitats. Tropical forests harbor the most species, but they are also found in temperate forests, scrubland, deserts, intertidal zones, and mountainous regions. Euophrys omnisuperstes is the species reported to have been collected at the highest elevation, on the slopes of Mount Everest.

== Models for mimicry ==
Some small insects are thought to have evolved an appearance or behavioural traits that resemble those of jumping spiders and this is suspected to prevent their predation, specifically from jumping spiders. Some examples appear to be provided by patterns on the wings of some tephritid flies, the nymph of a fulgorid and possibly some moths.

== Fossils ==
Very few jumping spider fossils have been found. Of those known, all are from Cenozoic era amber. The oldest fossils are from Baltic amber dating to the Eocene epoch, specifically, 54 to 42 million years ago. Other fossil jumping spiders have been preserved within Chiapas amber and Dominican amber.

== See also ==
- Peckhamia (journal)
- Spider taxonomy
