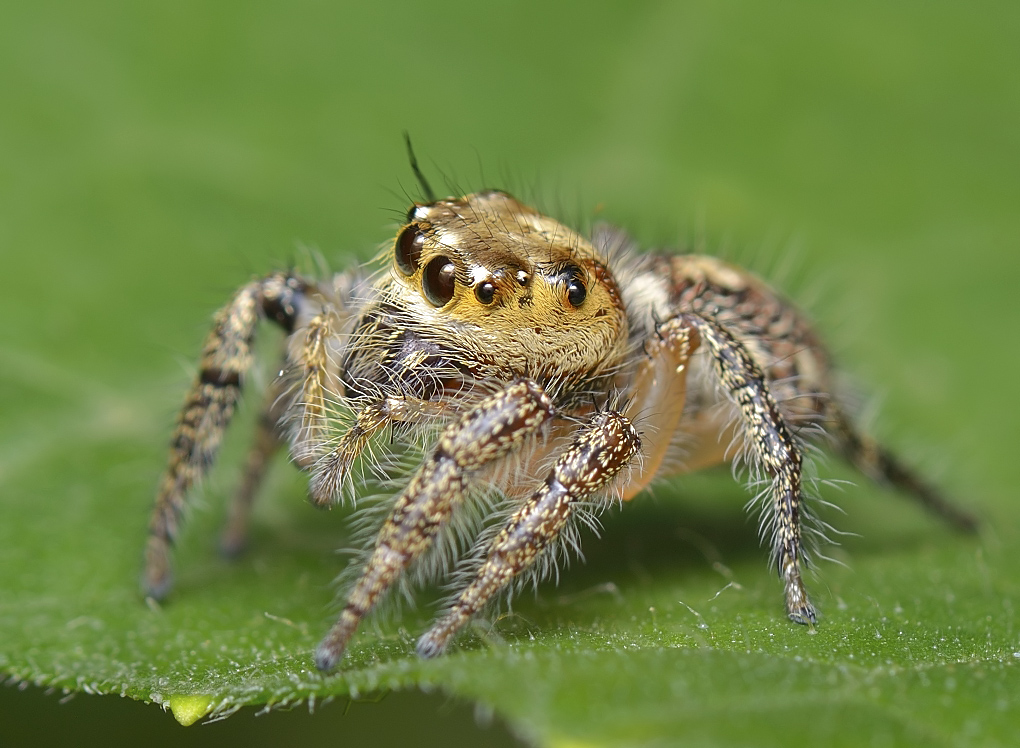
- Female

Scientific classification
- Kingdom: Animalia
- Phylum: Arthropoda
- Subphylum: Chelicerata
- Class: Arachnida
- Order: Araneae
- Infraorder: Araneomorphae
- Family: Salticidae
- Genus: Hyllus
- Species: H. semicupreus

Binomial name
- Hyllus semicupreus (Simon, 1885)

Synonyms
- Thyene semicuprea Simon, 1885; Phidippus indicus Tikader, 1974; Sandalodes semicupreus Simon, 1903; Thyene semicuprea Simon, 1885

= Hyllus semicupreus =

Heavy-bodied jumper

Species of spider

Hyllus semicupreus, the heavy-bodied jumper, also known as the semi-coppered heavy jumper, is a species of spider of the genus Hyllus. It is native to India, Pakistan and Sri Lanka.

== Description ==
As usual in spider morphology, the female is much larger than male, where the female is about 8–9 mm (0.31–0.35 in) in total length and the male is 7–9 mm (0.28–0.35 in) in length.

== Ecology ==
Heavy-bodied jumper spiders can be seen commonly among foliage and within tree trunks. They construct oval, thick silken webs on the undersides of leaves, such as the leaf spikes of coconut trees. During the daytime, the sac is uninhabited, but at night, the male occupies the sac. Sometimes, though, the female also inhabits it.

== Diet ==
The spider is known to eat small insects such as grasshoppers, flies, and bees, and other small spiders.

== Gallery ==
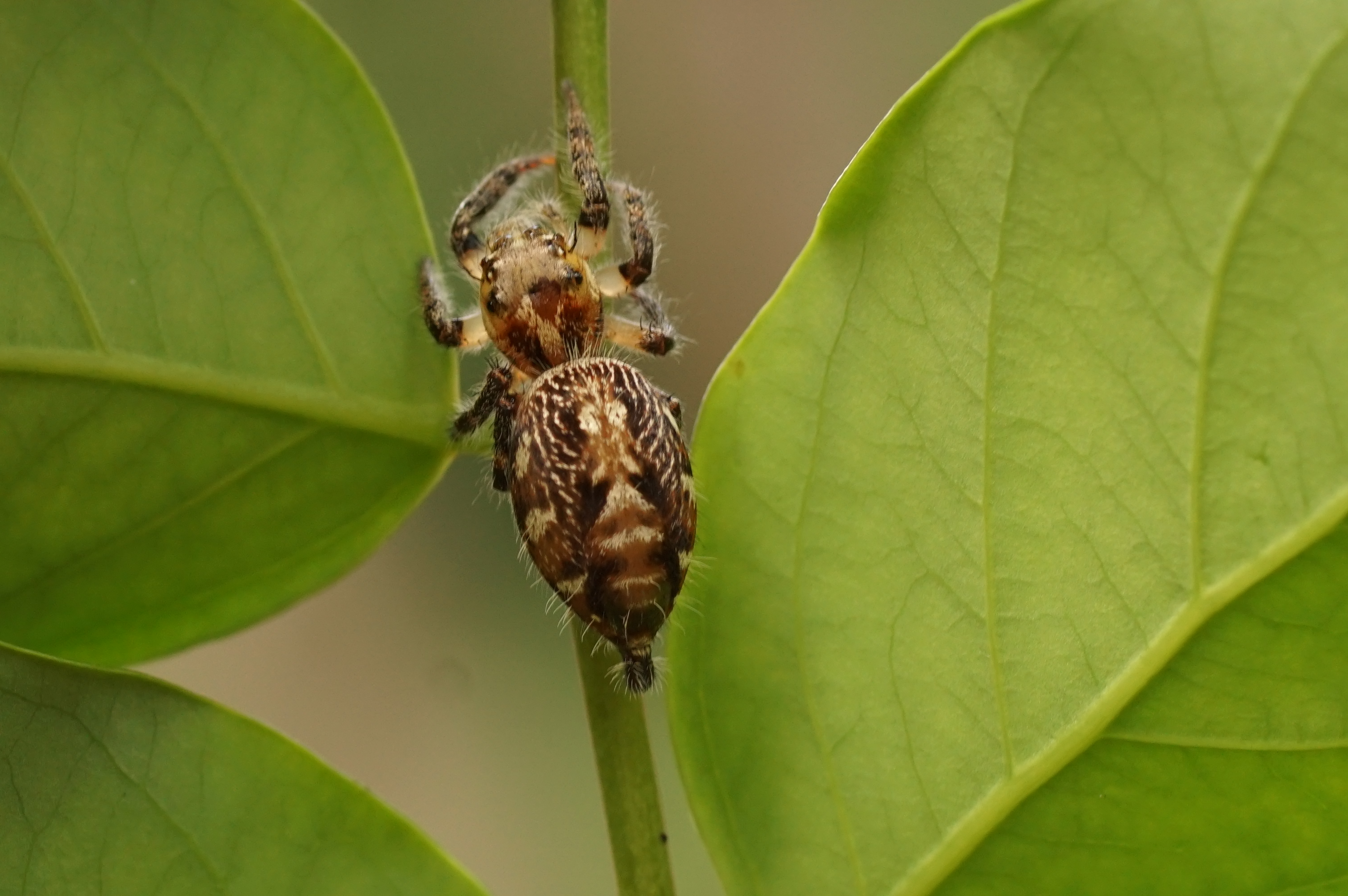
Female

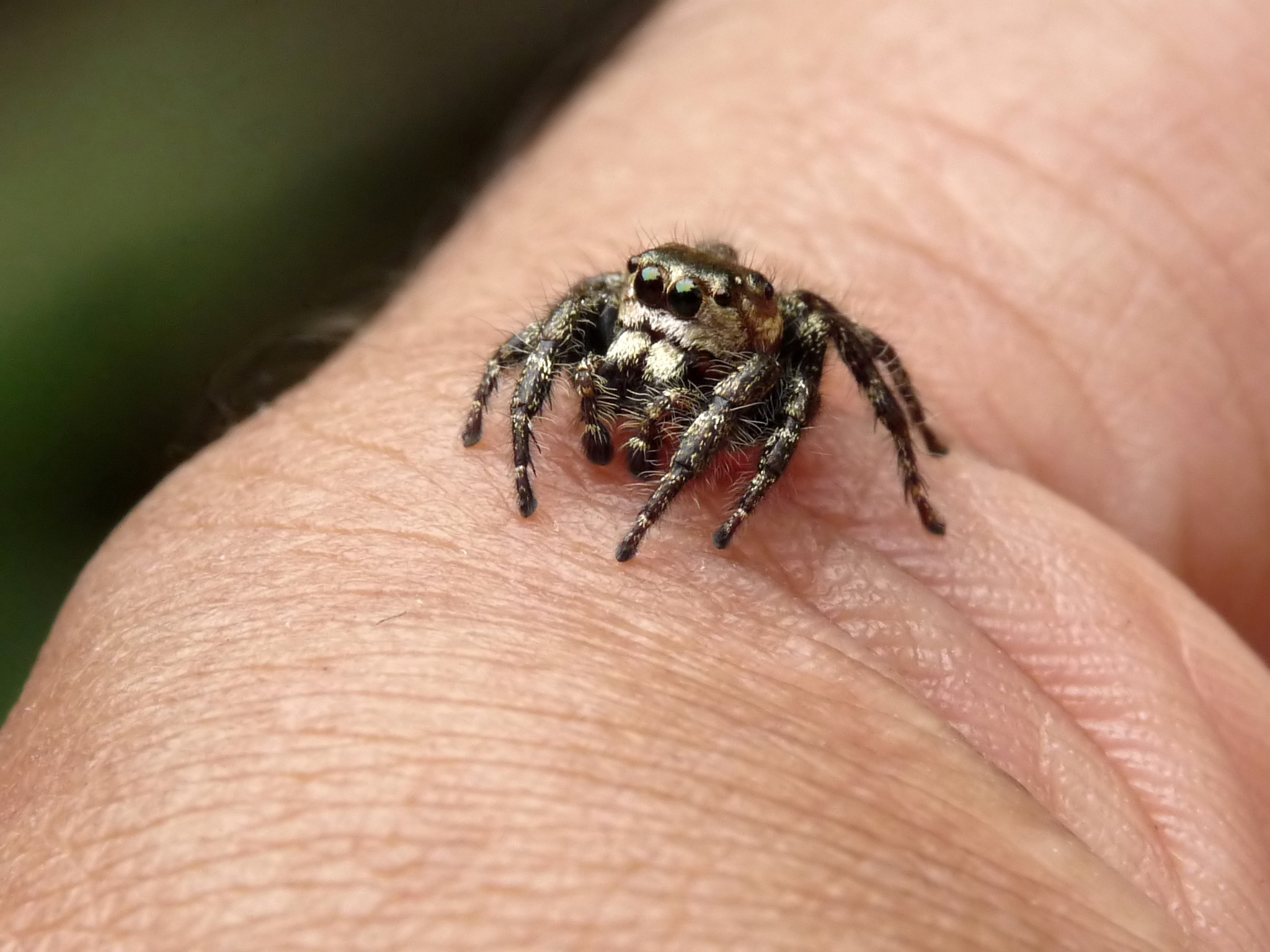
Male

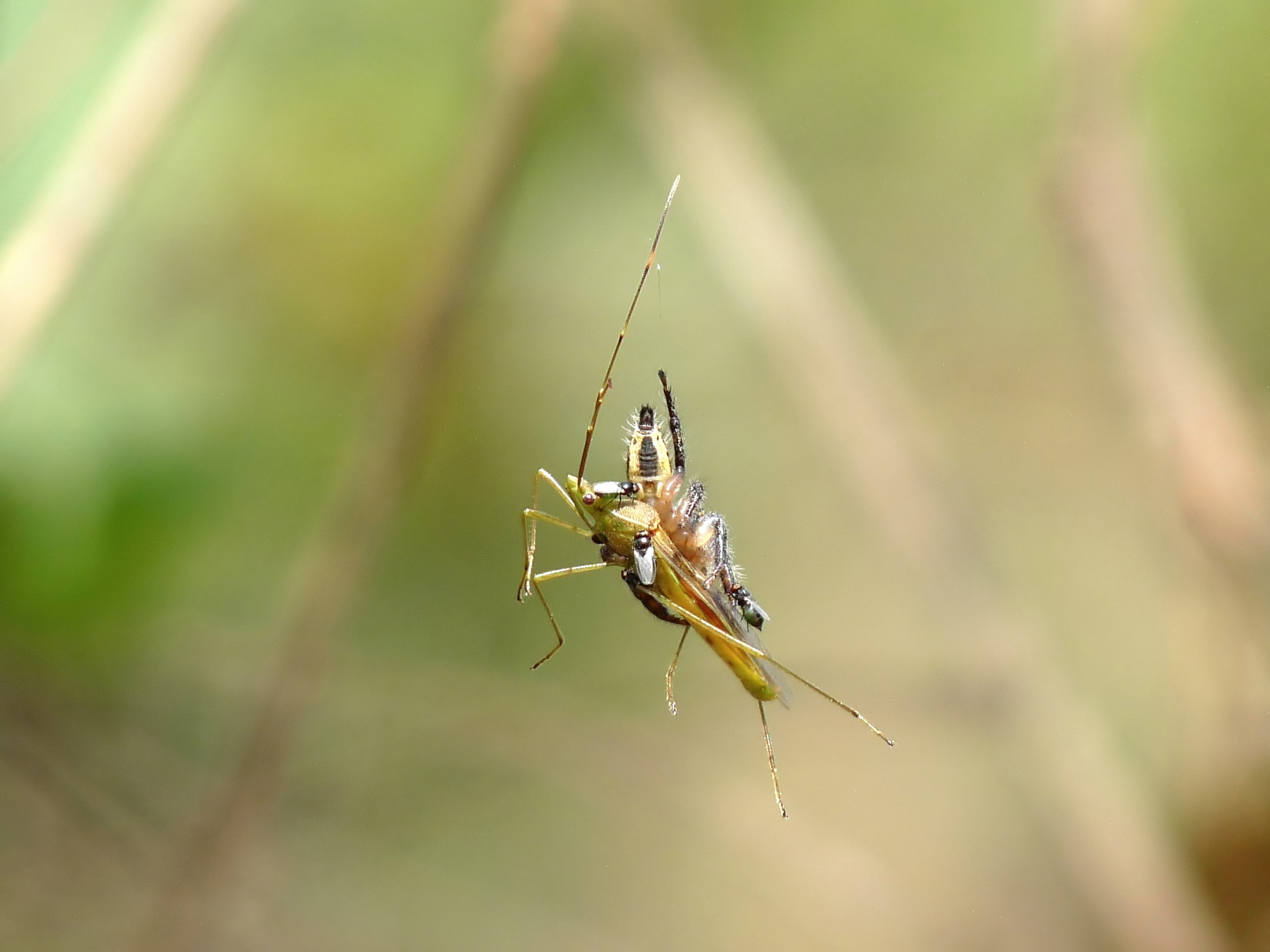
Hunting Leptocorisa

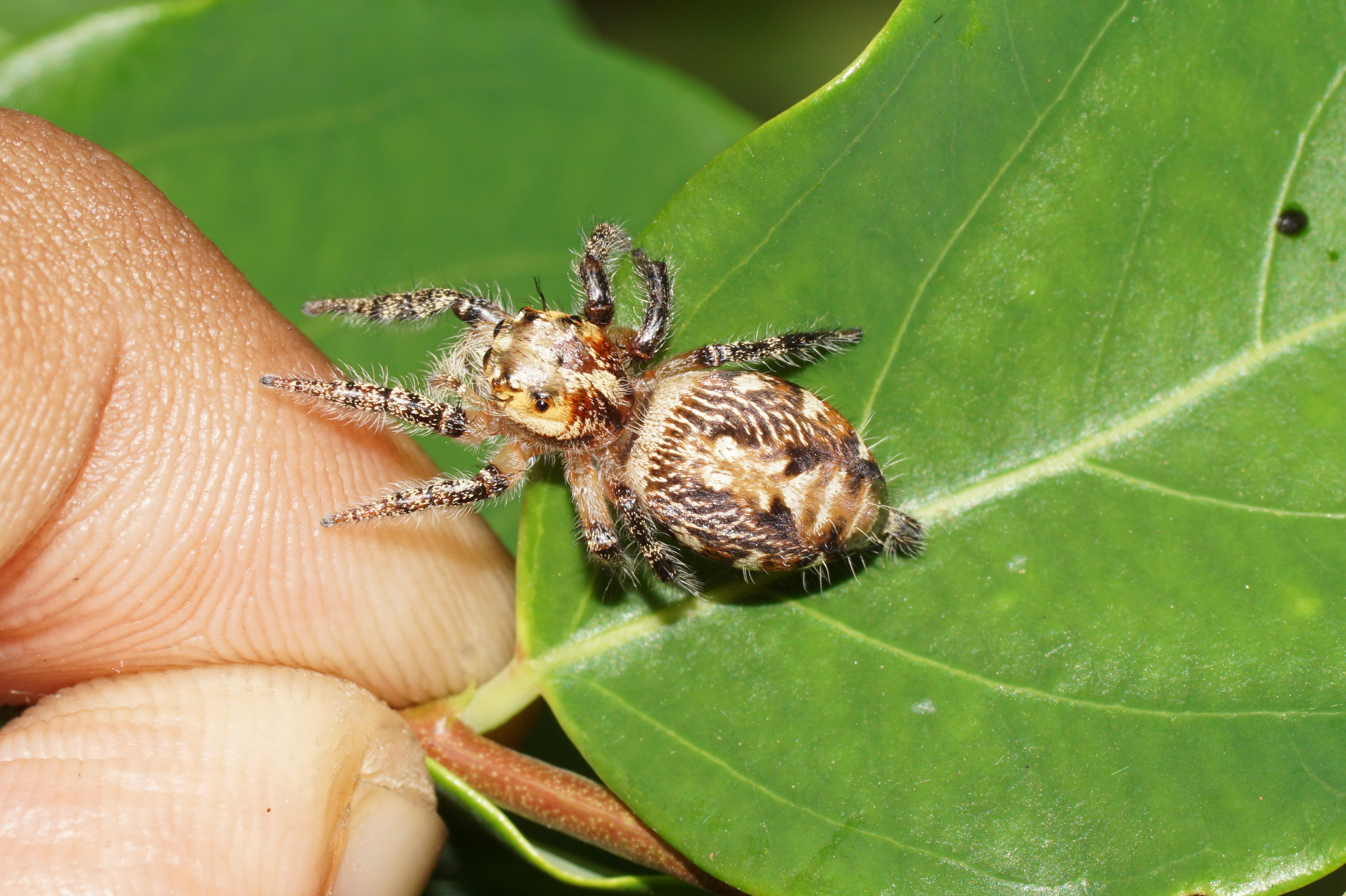
Dorsal side

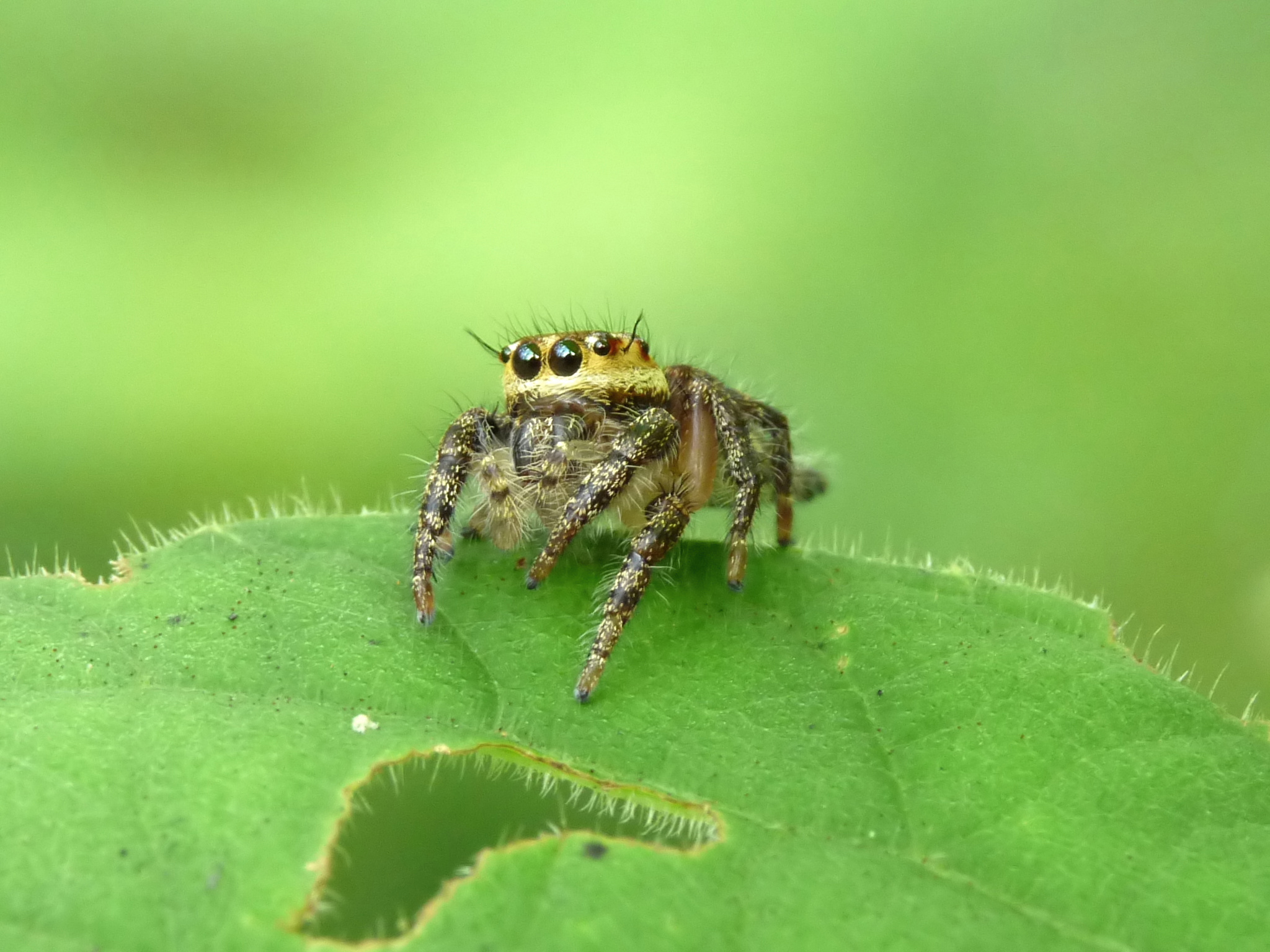
Female

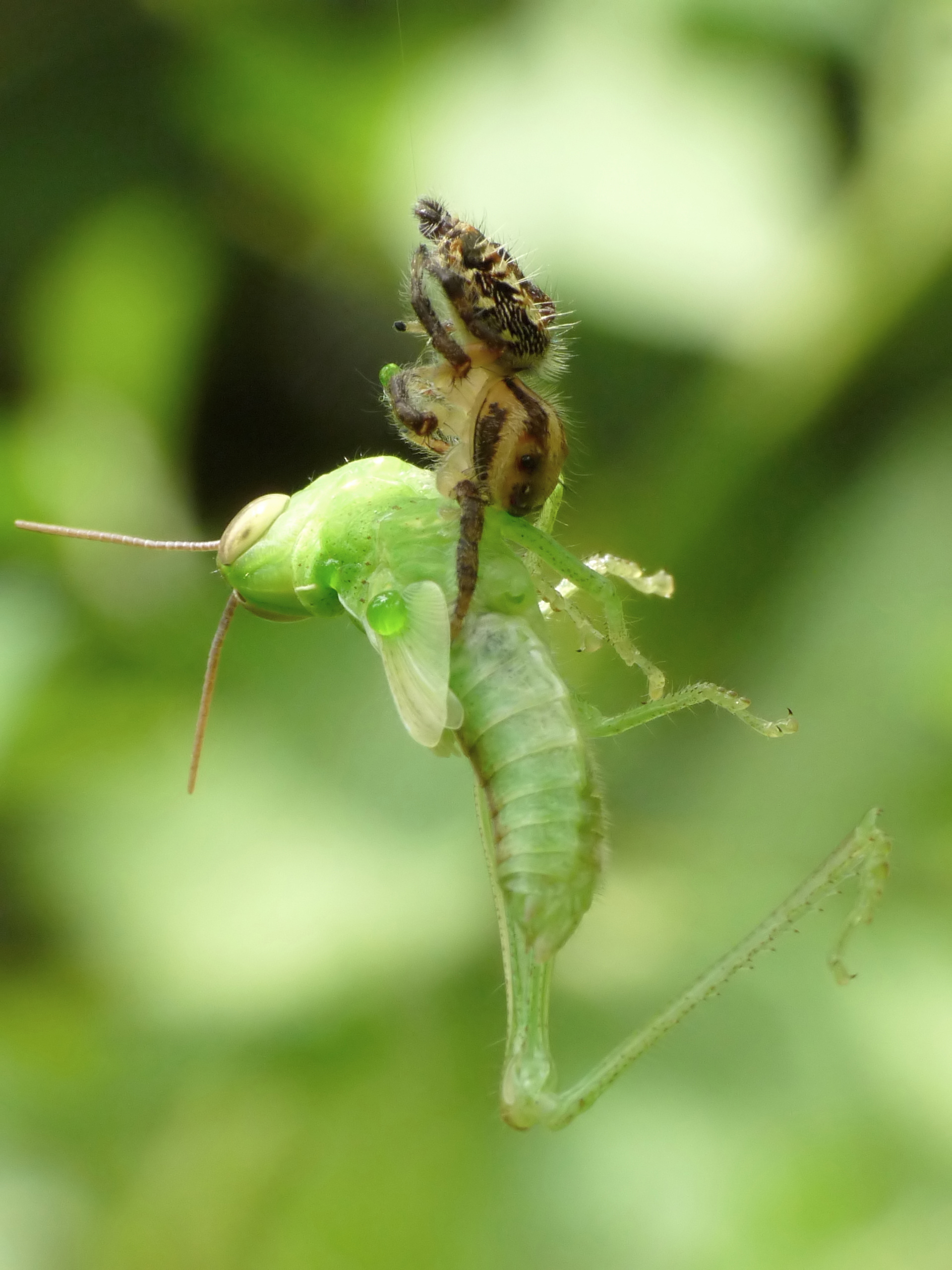
Preying on grasshopper
