= Physocyclus californicus =

Scientific classification
- Kingdom: Animalia
- Phylum: Arthropoda
- Subphylum: Chelicerata
- Class: Arachnida
- Order: Araneae
- Infraorder: Araneomorphae
- Family: Pholcidae
- Genus: Physocyclus
- Species: P. californicus

Binomial name
- Physocyclus californicus Chamberlin and Gertsch, 1929

Species of spider

Physocyclus californicus is a spider in the family Pholcidae ("cellar spiders"), in the infraorder Araneomorphae ("true spiders"). The distribution range of Physocyclus californicus includes the US and Mexico.
