= Physocyclus enaulus =

Scientific classification
- Domain: Eukaryota
- Kingdom: Animalia
- Phylum: Arthropoda
- Subphylum: Chelicerata
- Class: Arachnida
- Order: Araneae
- Infraorder: Araneomorphae
- Family: Pholcidae
- Genus: Physocyclus
- Species: P. enaulus

Binomial name
- Physocyclus enaulus Crosby, 1926

Species of spider

Physocyclus enaulus is a species of cellar spider in the family Pholcidae. It is found in the United States and Mexico.
