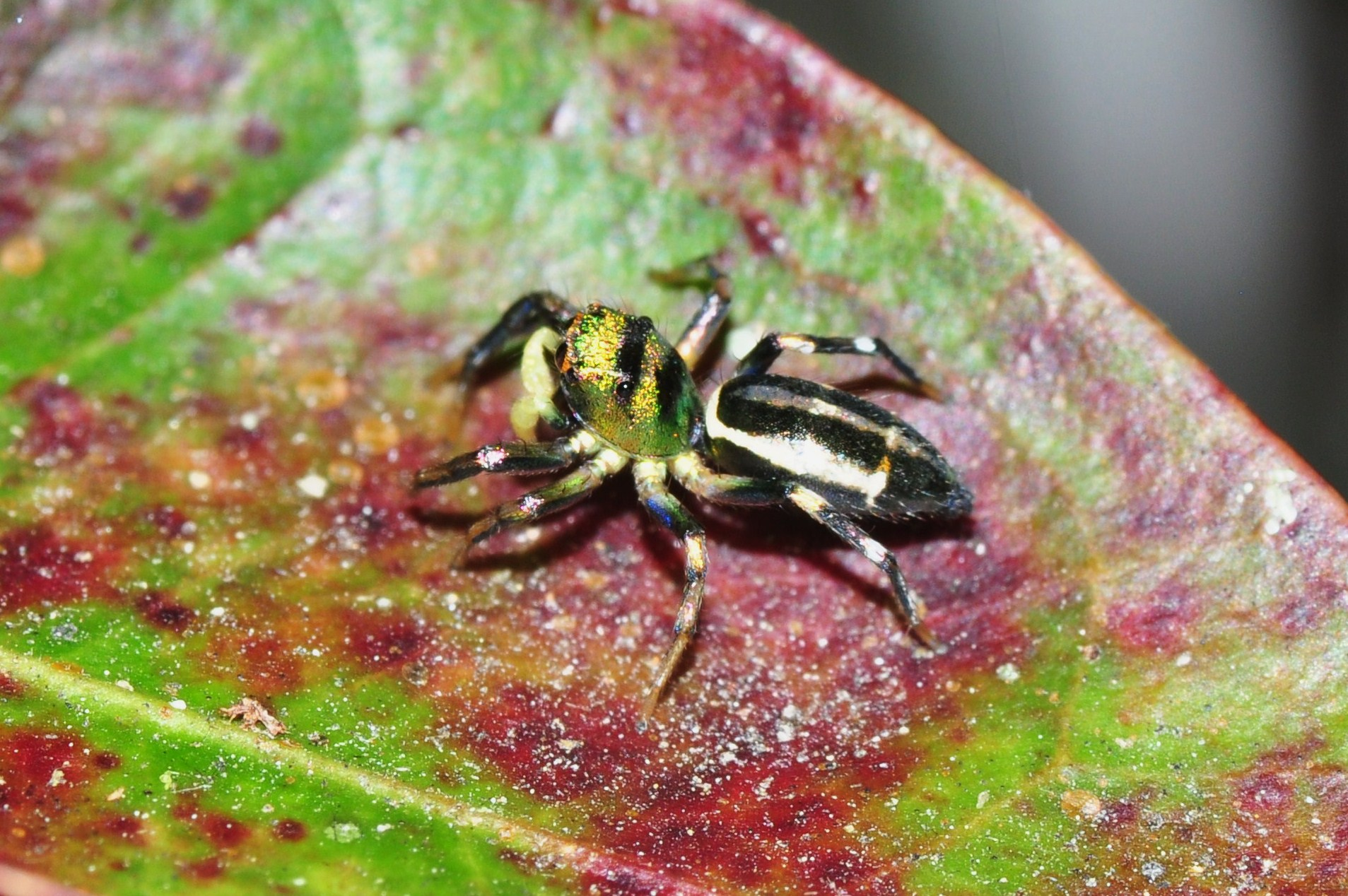

Scientific classification
- Kingdom: Animalia
- Phylum: Arthropoda
- Subphylum: Chelicerata
- Class: Arachnida
- Order: Araneae
- Infraorder: Araneomorphae
- Family: Salticidae
- Genus: Cosmophasis
- Species: C. umbratica

Binomial name
- Cosmophasis umbratica Simon, 1903

= Cosmophasis umbratica =

Species of spider

Cosmophasis umbratica is a species of jumping spider found in South and Southeast Asia. They are members of the family Salticidae and the genus Cosmophasis. They are commonly spotted on green vegetation. C. umbratica shows extreme dimorphism when viewed under UV light: males reflect UV on all body parts that are displayed during intraspecific interaction, while females and juveniles do not reflect UV at all. It seems that C. umbratica uses this in sexual signaling. A similar phenomenon is found in some butterflies. For example, several species of Colias and Gonepteryx, both of the family Pieridae, also display sexual signaling.

== Taxonomy ==
The scientific name of this particular spider is Cosmophasis umbratica. These spiders are part of the genus Cosmophasis. Some common names for this particular spider include shiny jumping spider, green iridescent garden jumper, and tropical ornate jumping spider.

Taxonomist Eugène Simon proposed the genus Cosmophasis in 1901. There are currently about 59 known species part of the genus. The species has roots in Latin as the term umbra means night shadow.

== Distribution & Habitat ==
The genus Cosmophasis is found near tropical regions as well as in areas of India to Sumatra. These spiders are commonly found in areas of low vegetation, plants in extravagant gardens, and in some instances on tree trunks. They typically reside on leaves and flowers of tropical plants in open areas. The shinny, jumping spiders are mainly active when exposed to sunlight and in morning and the earlier side of the afternoon.

Cosmophasis umbratica are most commonly found in regions of south and southeast Asia. These spiders are mainly spotted in regions with higher exposure to sunlight and are generally found on leaves of plants. Cosmophasis umbratica are primarily spotted during late mornings and early afternoons.

According to Joseph K H Koh’s Singapore guidebook, there is an abundance of this species in Singapore, providing a characteristic aesthetic glow. Although the exact origin of these spiders is not known, it is hypothesized that there is a direct correlation between the presence Ixora plant and the presence of these spiders.

== Description ==
The female Cosmophasis umbratica has a green cephalothorax and a mixture of the black, white, and brown abdomen. They do not have much iridescent coloration on their bodies. On the other hand, the male Cosmophasis umbratica are also green and black, but they have silver-like irredescent markings on their abdominal region. They have white, iridescent markings on the lateral cephalothorax and the dorsal as well as on the femora of all legs. Males also have silver-like lines along the abdomen.

Most males are bigger and brighter than these female spiders. Adult males tend to be anywhere from 5-7 mm in length. They are known for their long, slender legs that are brightly colored which help them jump from place to place. On the other hand, the adult females are only about 4-5mm in length and their legs are much shorter in comparison to males.

Both male and female C. umbratica present with sexual dimorphism in both size and color. Their colors will not fade over time as long as it is well preserved.

== Behavior ==
Cosmophasis umbratica displays dimorphic behavior in the presence of UV light. The male species reflect ultraviolet light (a wavelength less than 400 nm) on the entire body; however, females do not reflect UV light off of their bodies at all. Males will utilize this reflective ability during mating. This dimorphic behavior is an example of sexual signaling.

C. umbratica has four main ways of movement: skittering, drumming of palps, bobbing of the abdomen, and lunging. Palps are a second pair of appendages on the chelicerates on C. umbratica.

=== UV reflection ===
Males utilize their ability to reflect UV light as a mating call. The levels of “glow” on the male abdomen create varying interest among the females. The females are much more attracted to the glowing males in comparison to the males that have their UV reflection ability masked. However, it is probable that non-UV reflecting males have not been eliminated by evolutionary pressures because of their advantage of being inconspicuous to predators.

=== Web ===
Cosmophasis umbratica do not traditionally spin webs like most other species.On the other hand, due to their extensive eye depth and powerful vision, they have adopted a “stalk and leap” strategy. These spiders have even been referred to as the tigers of the spiders.

Cosmophasis umbratica build nests made of viscid silk for them to rest and retreat into. Their nests look similar to sheets made of silk with tubes on either side. Their nests tend to have wide openings with narrow "entry points". Both males and females tend to build similar features for their nests; however, females tend to seal their doors much more than males do.

=== Prey ===
With their unique UV reflection, the spiders rely heavily on their vision to hunt. They have a complex visual system that acts as their guidance when it comes to terms of prey. Their eyes can recognize objects that are about 20-30 feet away. They also have another set of eyes that help them detect long-range movement. Their two sets of eyes allow them to escape predators in an efficient manner as well as catch prey in a strategic way.

Furthermore, these spiders are known to be nectivorous. They feed off of the sweet nectar of the lxora plant. This species also feeds off of insects, including flies and crickets.

=== Life cycle ===
After mating, the female C. umbratica holds the sperm until she is ready to fertilize and lay her eggs. The mother will create an egg sac made of silk that will protect the eggs throughout their development, which is a behavior observed in many spiders. As the eggs are woven and hidden inside the silk, they stay there until fertilization occurs. The mother will lay anywhere from two to thirty-six eggs.

Although some spiders may lay there woven sac in a secure location, the mother C. umbratica carries her sac with her until her egglings hatch in order to protect them. When the eggs are ready to hatch, spiderlings emerge

=== Reproduction ===
Males become sexually mature before females. They are on the hunt for a suitable partner earlier on. During male to female interactions, skittering is one of the main ways to attract a female. Females tended to be drawn to the level of excitement the males displayed. Therefore, in the presence of females, males became eager and move their bodies back and forth. As the male attempts to mate with a female, there is a lot of decamping taking place. When a male faces the female and she doesn’t decamp, then the male will continue to skitter alongside her grabbing her attention. Furthermore, the male will drum and his posture straightens and he flexes his abdomen and displays his UV light.

Sometimes, the female will try to gain the male’s attention. This is done by bending the abdomen and prodding onto the male. There is a game of “tag” between the male and female as one tries to grab the attention of the other. The females generally try to avoid the attention of the male for as long as possible before entertaining the male.

The coupling time varies between each of the C. umbratica. Almost all couplings end with the females scurrying away. Females will not have just one partner throughout their lifespan.

=== Consequences of sexual dimorphism ===
The colorful bodily array on the spiders may benefit the males in terms of sexual selection. However, quite contrarily, the males do in fact have pay for it. The UV reflecting individuals can be easily spotted by predators. The level of attraction may increase potential mating options but it also increases the rate at which there are predators. The predators notice the glow that is embedded in the bodies of the males and if a predator were to have good eyesight, they’re able to spot the UV light from great lengths away.

=== Male-male interaction ===
Most often, when two males interact with one another, it usually involves a fight of some sort. These interactions usually behind when the spiders about 10-15 cm away from the other. They each separately raise their bodies, have their legs hunched, and they bend their abdomens facing one another. They start slowly coming towards one another and their palps begin to vibrate. Once they are about 2-3 bodies within each other, they begin to lunge at each other with their legs forward and elevated. Traditionally, after an initial altercation, one of the spiders will decamp and the other will chase the decamping spider. For the most part, the bigger spider will win the fight; however, if both spiders are similar in size than the spiders will extend and retract their legs at each other for a longer period of time. Eventually, one male will turn out to be successful in the fight and they will be deemed the winner.

== Bites to humans ==
=== Venom ===
Cosmophasis umbratica are known to be harmless to people and do not tend to bite individuals. The spider’s venom is harmless and non poisonous unless one is allergic to spiders in general. There should not be any risk of getting bitten by C. umbratica. Even if one were to attack and try to kill these spiders, very rarely would these spiders bite as they are traditionally considered non-violent. These C. umbratica are known to be one of the 'kindest' spiders in the world.
