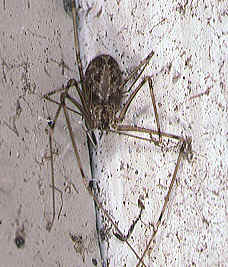
- Female

Scientific classification
- Kingdom: Animalia
- Phylum: Arthropoda
- Subphylum: Chelicerata
- Class: Arachnida
- Order: Araneae
- Infraorder: Araneomorphae
- Family: Pholcidae
- Genus: Physocyclus
- Species: P. globosus

Binomial name
- Physocyclus globosus (Taczanowski, 1874)

Synonyms
- Pholcus globosus Pholcus gibbosus Decetia incisa Physocyclus dubius Physocyclus muricola Physocyclus orientalis

= Physocyclus globosus =

Short-bodied cellar spider

Species of spider

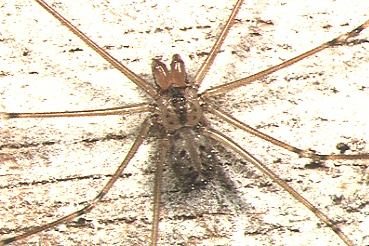
male

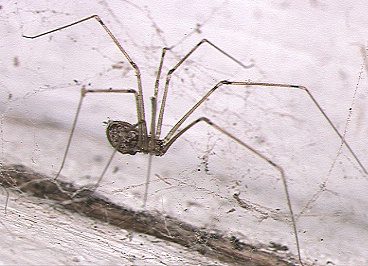
female

Physocyclus globosus, sometimes known as the short-bodied cellar spider is a species of spider belonging to the family Pholcidae. This is a cosmopolitan species, found in caves and buildings throughout the warmer parts of the world.

This is a small brown spider (body length around 6 mm), with a short, broad abdomen. A black line runs along the back of the carapace, continuing along most of the abdomen. The eight eyes are grouped close together on a raised hump on the face.
