= Sonoita ledouxi =

Scientific classification
- Kingdom: Animalia
- Phylum: Arthropoda
- Subphylum: Chelicerata
- Class: Arachnida
- Order: Araneae
- Infraorder: Araneomorphae
- Family: Salticidae
- Genus: Sonoita
- Species: S. ledouxi

Binomial name
- Sonoita ledouxi Wesołowska & Russell-Smith, 2022

Species of jumping spider

Sonoita ledouxi is a jumping spider species that lives in Africa. Found in Ivory Coast and Uganda, the spider is large and slender, with a total body length between 4.6 and 6.4 mm (0.18 and 0.25 in). The female is larger than the male but is otherwise similar externally. The spider is generally coloured dark brown on the upper part of its front section, its carapace and, behind this, its abdomen, is light greyish-olive. There are small, sunken oval or round depressions on its upper surface of its abdomen. Its chelicerae have three teeth at the front and six very small teeth at the back. The male spider's front legs are larger than the remainder and dark brown rather than yellow. The female's legs are all brownish-yellow. The male has a spatula-shaped appendage called a tibial apophysis on its copulatory organs. The female has dense white hairs in the middle of its epigyne, the external visible part of its copulatory organs, which most easily distinguishes it from the otherwise externally very similar Sonoita lightfooti.

== Etymology and taxonomy ==
Sonoita ledouxi is a species of jumping spider, a member of the family Salticidae, that was first described by the arachnologists Wanda Wesołowska and Anthony Russell-Smith in 2022. They allocated it to the genus Sonoita, which had been itself been first circumscribed by the naturalists George and Elizabeth Peckham in 1903. The spider was one of over 500 species identified by Wesołowska during her career. Its specific name is derived from the name of the person whose collection held the holotype of the species, Jean-Claude Ledoux.

Analysis of molecular data demonstrates that the genus forms a clade with Holcolaetis. In 2015, the evolutionary biologist Wayne Maddison undertook a phylogenetic classification that showed that the two genera are the only members of subtribe Holcolaetina in the tribe Spartaeini in the subfamily Spartaeinae. In 2017, the arachnologist Jerzy Prószyński added the genus to a group of genera named Cocalodines, which is named after the genus Cocalodes.

== Description ==
A large slender spider, Sonoita ledouxi is similar to its relative, Sonoita lightfooti, but has distinctive characteristics. Its body is divided into two main parts: a forward section, known as its cephalothorax, and, behind that, an abdomen. The male has a cephalothorax that is between 2.3 and 2.5 mm (0.09 and 0.10 in) long, between 1.8 and 1.9 mm (0.07 and 0.07 in) wide and between 1.4 and 1.5 mm (0.06 and 0.06 in) high. Its carapace, the hard upper part of its cephalothorax, is a dark brown oval that is covered in colourless hairs amongst which can be found a scattering of long brown bristles. It has dark lines emanating from its distinct fovea in the middle of its carapace. The underside of its cephalothorax, or sternum, is light brown. There are three teeth at the front and six very small teeth at the back of its chelicerae. Its remaining mouthparts, including its labium and maxillae, are brown and has light tips.

The male's abdomen measures between 2.3 and 2.6 mm (0.09 and 0.10 in) long and between 1.3 and 1.4 mm (0.05 and 0.06 in) wide. Elongated and flat, it is light greyish-olive in colour and has small, sunken oval or round depressions on its upper surface. There are dense long bristles on its front edge and, at the rear, greyish spinnerets that are used to spin webs. Its first pair of legs are dark brown with orange metatarsi and a covering of black feather-like hairs on other sections. The remaining legs are smaller than its front legs and yellow with brown sections with long brown leg hairs. Its pedipalps are brown with white scales visible at the end of tibia.

At the end of its pedipalp is the male's spider's copulatory organs. At the end of its tibia is a spatula-shaped appendage called a tibial apophysis and a smooth cymbium and, attached to this is attached a large bulgy palpal bulb. The bulb has a pointed end at the bottom of its tegulum that is the source of its long embolus that runs around the bulb to the top to form a spike that points away from the cymbium. A pair of smaller anvil-shaped appendages can also be seen on the side of the spider's tegulum.

The female is slightly larger and more hairy than the male but otherwise is similar than the male. It has a cephalothorax that is between 2.5 and 2.7 mm (0.10 and 0.11 in) long, between 1.7 and 2 mm (0.07 and 0.08 in) wide and typically 1 mm (0.04 in) high. Its carapace is similar to the male, differing in the presence of short whitish hairs covering the whole surface and white scales around its front row of eyes. There are also white hairs on the part of the spider's face called its clypeus. Its abdomen is yellow with a pattern of three brown belts on its upper surface and long brown bristles on its front edge. It measures typically 3.7 mm (0.15 in) long and 2.6 mm (0.10 in) wide. The spider has brownish-yellow legs and light pedipalps.

The female's epigyne, the external visible part of its copulatory organs, has a central area hidden by dense white hairs and a notch on its back ridge. There are two copulatory openings near the middle of its epigyne that lead via long narrow insemination ducts to large rounded spermathecae, or receptacles. Large accessory glands are also visible inside. The whole structure shows high levels of sclerotization. The epigyne's covering of white hairs, as well as the length and narrowness of the insemination ducts, help distinguish the species from the related Sonoita lightfooti.

== Distribution and habitat ==
First found in South Africa, Sonoita spiders have been identified across Africa. Although first seen in Ivory Coast, Sonoita ledouxi has also been observed in the Budongo Forest in Uganda. It lives amongst trees, where it has been found on branches, and in savanna that has undergone seasonal wildfires.
