= Sparbambus =

Scientific classification
- Kingdom: Animalia
- Phylum: Arthropoda
- Subphylum: Chelicerata
- Class: Arachnida
- Order: Araneae
- Infraorder: Araneomorphae
- Family: Salticidae
- Subfamily: Spartaeinae
- Genus: Sparbambus; Zhang, Woon & Li, 2006
- Species: S. gombakensis

Binomial name
- Sparbambus gombakensis Zhang, Woon & Li, 2006

Genus of spiders

Sparbambus is a genus of jumping spiders containing the two species, Sparbambus gombakensis and Sparbambus sindhudurg. It was first described by J. X. Zhang, J. R. W. Woon & D. Q. Li in 2006, and is found in China, India and Malaysia. They are similar to members of Wanlessia. The name is derived from the Indian bambu, referring to the habitat where the species was initially found. The prefix spar denotes that the genus is in the subfamily Spartaeinae. The two species name refers to the type localities, the Ulu Gombak Malaysia and Sindhudurg Maharashtra, India.

The original species were found in bamboo, but repeated searches have failed to find new specimens, leading experts to believe that bamboo isn't their normal habitat. It seems to share the same microhabitat with Paracyrba wanlessi, which preys on aquatic animals, such as Gigantochloa scortechinii, in the hollow interior of decaying bamboo internodes.
