= Galianora sacha =

Scientific classification
- Kingdom: Animalia
- Phylum: Arthropoda
- Subphylum: Chelicerata
- Class: Arachnida
- Order: Araneae
- Infraorder: Araneomorphae
- Family: Salticidae
- Genus: Galianora
- Species: G. sacha

Binomial name
- Galianora sacha Maddison, 2006

Species of spider

Galianora sacha is a species of jumping spider (family Salticidae) from Ecuador.

This species is pale, elongate, long-legged and somewhat flattened. It superficially resembles the genera Itata or Helpis. The first pair of legs is elongate and probably used for catching prey. Both sexes are pale and yellowish, except for pigmented areas around the eyes, dark speckles on the abdomen and some darker areas on the legs, especially the distal half of the first tibia. The fine hairs that cover the animal are mostly upright and black on the legs, and largely orange or white on the body. Orange hairs cover the pigmented integument around the eyes. Males are 5 mm long, females about 4 mm.

This species was collected from understorey trees in lowland rainforest, near a small stream.

== Name ==
The species name is derived from Quechua sacha "tree/forest", referring to its habitat, as well as to the place it was first found (Jatun Sacha, Ecuador).
