= Gelotia lanka =

Scientific classification
- Kingdom: Animalia
- Phylum: Arthropoda
- Subphylum: Chelicerata
- Class: Arachnida
- Order: Araneae
- Infraorder: Araneomorphae
- Family: Salticidae
- Genus: Gelotia
- Species: G. lanka

Binomial name
- Gelotia lanka Wijesinghe, 1991

Species of spider

Gelotia lanka is a species of jumping spider of the genus Gelotia. It is endemic to Sri Lanka.

== Behavior ==
G. lanka normally moves by steadily stepping forward, pausing and then continuing again, accompanied by palp and leg waving. They can leap over obstacles, but normally choose to walk around them instead. This spider has no trouble walking on any kind of web or silk, not adhering either to cribellate or ecribellate types of spider silk.

Their hunting mechanism is, like most spartaeines, somewhat different from most salticids, where G. lanka tends to lunge at prey from close range rather than leap from far range. They will also invade the webs of other spiders to feed on them. By plucking upon the webs of other spiders(usually using their palps but occasionally their front legs as well) and making specialized vibratory signals, Gelotia lanka tries out different manners of plucking. When a method which works is found, the spider reuses it and lures the host spider over to the Gelotia. Finally, the resident spider is killed and consumed. They do not spin webs, though they do hang up dead leaves in the webs of other spiders on which to rest and oviposit.

This spider will also hunt cursorial spiders and insects, attacking them via close-range lunging.

== Ecology ==
Gelotia lanka was found by researchers in rainforest at Kaneliya, Sri Lanka. They seem to be very rare, as the scientists conducted jumping spider-related research in that region but only managed to find two adult female individuals of Gelotia lanka. Information on their ecological interactions apart from their predation on other spiders is still lacking.

This species is very similar in hunting strategy and some characteristics to the other spartaeine genera Brettus, Cyrba and to some extent Portia.
