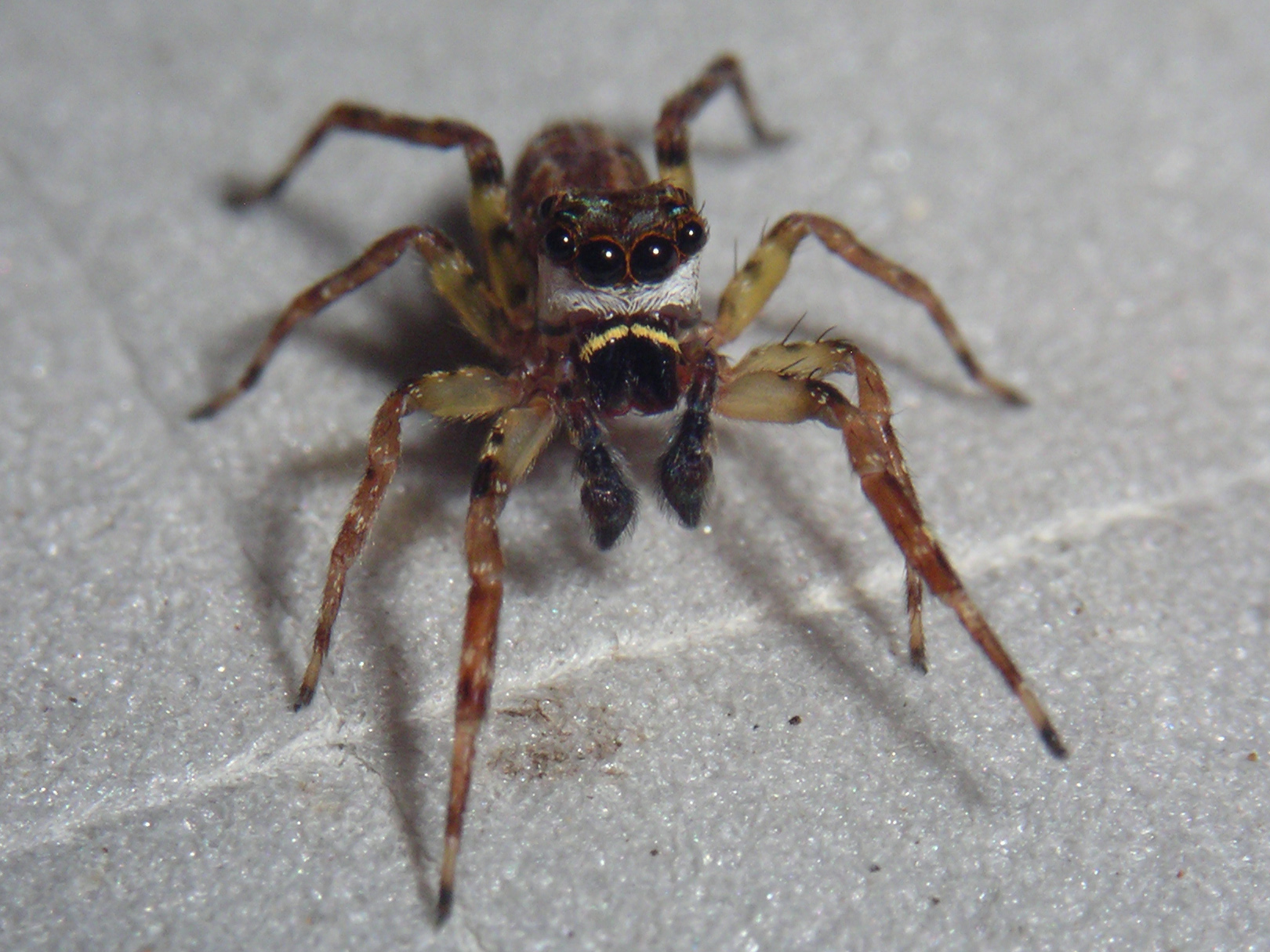
- Male Lapsias lorax

Scientific classification
- Kingdom: Animalia
- Phylum: Arthropoda
- Subphylum: Chelicerata
- Class: Arachnida
- Order: Araneae
- Infraorder: Araneomorphae
- Family: Salticidae
- Subfamily: Spartaeinae
- Genus: Lapsias; Simon, 1900

Type species
- Lapsias estebanensis Simon, 1900

Species
- See text.

Diversity
- 12 species

= Lapsias =

Genus of spiders

Lapsias is a spider genus of the jumping spider family, Salticidae.

== Phylogeny ==
Lapsias, Galianora and Thrandina are informally classified as "lapsiines". These are believed to be basal jumping spiders. While Galianora and Thrandina are sister genera, it is not certain if they form a clade with Lapsias, or if the common characteristics are symplesiomorphic.

== Description ==
Lapsias lorax is typical of the genus, with large eyes and prominent male palps. There is a short video of Lapsias lorax, showing typical jumping spider behavior.

== Species ==
As of April 2022, the World Spider Catalog accepted 12 species:

- Lapsias canandea Maddison, 2012 – Ecuador
- Lapsias ciliatus Simon, 1900 – Venezuela
- Lapsias cyrboides Simon, 1900 – Venezuela
- Lapsias estebanensis Simon, 1900 – Venezuela
- Lapsias guamani Maddison, 2012 – Ecuador
- Lapsias iguaque (Muñoz-Charry, Galvis & Martínez, 2022) – Colombia
- Lapsias lorax Maddison, 2012 – Ecuador
- Lapsias quimbaya (Muñoz-Charry, Galvis & Martínez, 2022) – Colombia
- Lapsias tayrona (Muñoz-Charry, Galvis & Martínez, 2022) – Colombia
- Lapsias tequendama (Muñoz-Charry, Galvis & Martínez, 2022) – Colombia
- Lapsias tovarensis Simon, 1901 – Venezuela
- Lapsias walekeru (Muñoz-Charry, Galvis & Martínez, 2022) – Colombia

Lapsias melanopygus Caporiacco, 1947 is considered a doubtful name (nomen dubium).
