= N. cornutus =

N. cornutus may refer to:

- Neobrettus cornutus, a spider species in the genus Neobrettus
- Nesodon cornutus, an extinct mammal species
- Notropis cornutus, a fish species

== See also ==
- Cornutus (disambiguation)
