= Thrandina =

Scientific classification
- Kingdom: Animalia
- Phylum: Arthropoda
- Subphylum: Chelicerata
- Class: Arachnida
- Order: Araneae
- Infraorder: Araneomorphae
- Family: Salticidae
- Subfamily: Spartaeinae
- Genus: Thrandina; Maddison, 2006

Species
- See text

Genus of spiders

Thrandina is a genus of jumping spiders, with three species found in Ecuador. It is unique among New World salticids in having strikingly large posterior median eyes.

== Description ==
Thrandina and its sister genus Galianora share the ancestral salticid traits of a tarsal claw on the female palpus and a median apophysis on the male palp. This is rare among neotropical salticids. Both genera are informally grouped as "lapsiines", together with Lapsias. However, the shared basal characteristics with Lapsias could be symplesiomorphic.

Males of Thrandina parocula are about 4 millimetres (0.16 in) long. Their carapace is dark brown to black, except for a central pale longitudinal stripe on the thorax. The legs are pale to medium brown, with a darker femur I. The abdomen is medium brown with lighter chevrons above, and pale below with dark speckles. The female is slightly smaller with a bodylength of 3.6 millimetres (0.14 in). It looks like the male, but with more annulate legs.

Thrandina parocula was collected from moss-covered branches and tree-trunks in the understory of moist forests at elevations of 1,000 metres (3,300 ft) and higher, up to 2,270 metres (7,450 ft). Males walk fluid but hesitantly, frequently pausing and then raising and lowering.their first two pairs of legs in synchrony. A similar gait is observed in Spartaeinae.

== Species ==
- Thrandina bellavista (Maddison, 2012)
- Thrandina cosanga (Maddison, 2012)
- Thrandina parocula (Maddison, 2006)

== Name ==
The genus is a contraction of Thranduil, the king of Mirkwood elves in J.R.R. Tolkien's mythology, which, as Thrandina, inhabit shady forests, and andina, referring to the Andean habitat.

The species name refers to the relatively equal sizes of the lateral and posterior eyes.
