= Soesiladeepakius =

Scientific classification
- Kingdom: Animalia
- Phylum: Arthropoda
- Subphylum: Chelicerata
- Class: Arachnida
- Order: Araneae
- Infraorder: Araneomorphae
- Family: Salticidae
- Subfamily: Spartaeinae
- Genus: Soesiladeepakius; Makhan, 2007

Diversity
- 7 species

Genus of spiders

Soesiladeepakius is a spider genus of the jumping spider family, Salticidae.

The type species S. aschnae is only known from male specimens. These are 2.4 mm long, with a brown carapace.

== Name ==
The genus is a combination of the given names Soesila and Deepak, the wife and son of the describer. The type species is named after the describer's daughter Aschna.

== Species ==
- Soesiladeepakius arthrostylus Ruiz & Maddison, 2012 — Brazil
- Soesiladeepakius aschnae Makhan, 2007 — Suriname
- Soesiladeepakius biarmatus Ruiz & Maddison, 2012 — Brazil
- Soesiladeepakius gasnieri Ruiz & Maddison, 2012 — Brazil
- Soesiladeepakius lyra Ruiz & Maddison, 2012 — Brazil
- Soesiladeepakius retroversus Ruiz & Maddison, 2012 — Brazil
- Soesiladeepakius uncinatus Ruiz & Maddison, 2012 — Brazil

== See also ==
- Rishaschia
- Soesilarishius
