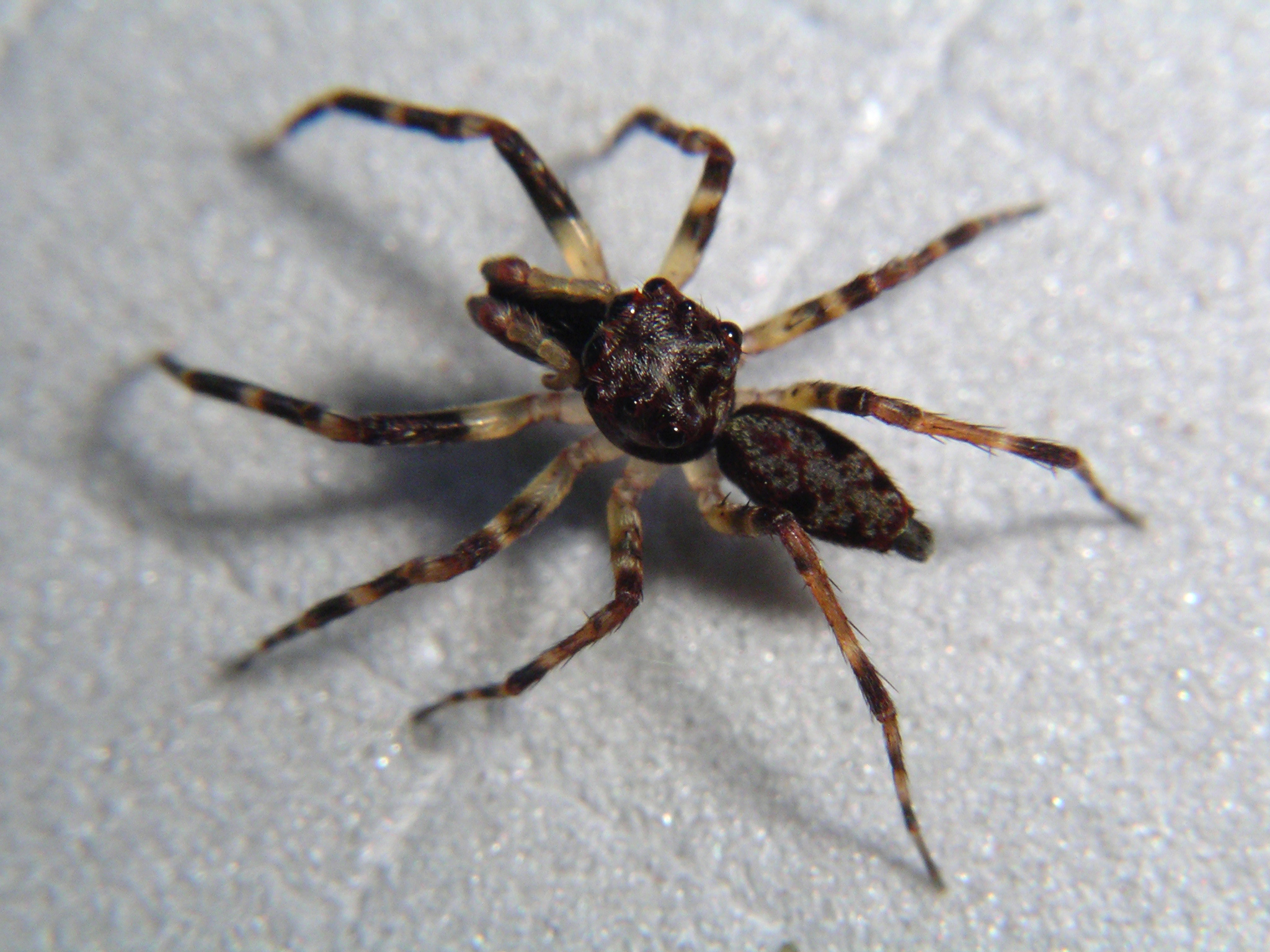
- Male Allococalodes madidus

Scientific classification
- Kingdom: Animalia
- Phylum: Arthropoda
- Subphylum: Chelicerata
- Class: Arachnida
- Order: Araneae
- Infraorder: Araneomorphae
- Family: Salticidae
- Subfamily: Spartaeinae
- Genus: Allococalodes; Wanless, 1982

Type species
- A. alticeps Wanless, 1982

Species
- A. alticeps Wanless, 1982 – New Guinea; A. cornutus Wanless, 1982 – New Guinea; A. madidus Maddison, 2009 – New Guinea

= Allococalodes =

Genus of spiders

Allococalodes is a genus of Papuan jumping spiders that was first described by F. R. Wanless in 1982. As of October 2026 it contains only three species, found only in New Guinea: A. alticeps, A. cornutus, and A. madidus. It is closely related the genus Cocalodes. The name is a combination of Ancient Greek ἄλλος ("allo"), meaning "other", and the genus Cocalodes.

Allococalodes males measure 4–8 mm (0.16–0.31 in) in length.
