= Sonoita (disambiguation) =

Sonoita may refer to

- Sonoita, a genus of spiders containing one species, Sonoita lightfooti

places in the United States:

- Sonoita, a place in Santa Cruz County, Arizona
- Sonoita AVA, Arizona wine region in Santa Cruz County
- Sonoita Creek, a river Santa Cruz County

places in Mexico:

- Sonoyta, a town in Sonora
