= Sonoita (spider) =

Scientific classification
- Kingdom: Animalia
- Phylum: Arthropoda
- Subphylum: Chelicerata
- Class: Arachnida
- Order: Araneae
- Infraorder: Araneomorphae
- Family: Salticidae
- Subfamily: Spartaeinae
- Genus: Sonoita; Peckham & Peckham, 1903

Genus of spiders

Sonoita is a genus of jumping spiders. It was first described by George and Elizabeth Peckham in 1903, and is found only in Africa.

== Species ==
As of October 2025, this genus includes two species:

- Sonoita ledouxi Wesołowska & Russell-Smith, 2022 – Ivory Coast, Uganda
- Sonoita lightfooti G. W. Peckham & E. G. Peckham, 1903 – Ivory Coast, Ethiopia, Zimbabwe, Mozambique, South Africa, India? (type species)
