= Galianora bryicola =

Scientific classification
- Kingdom: Animalia
- Phylum: Arthropoda
- Subphylum: Chelicerata
- Class: Arachnida
- Order: Araneae
- Infraorder: Araneomorphae
- Family: Salticidae
- Genus: Galianora
- Species: G. bryicola

Binomial name
- Galianora bryicola Maddison, 2006

Species of spider

Galianora bryicola is a species of jumping spider (family Salticidae) from Ecuador.

Males are about 4 mm long, adult females are not yet known. This species is brown with a generalized salticid body form. The carapace is brown to black with a pale central longitudinal stripe on the thorax. The back of the abdomen is medium brown with indistinct speckling, the underside is black.

One male was collected on a tree trunk, several juveniles were collected by beating moss-covered branches and tree trunks in the understorey of lowland rainforest.

== Name ==
The species name refers to the habitat of mossy tree trunks: bryicola means "dwelling on moss".
