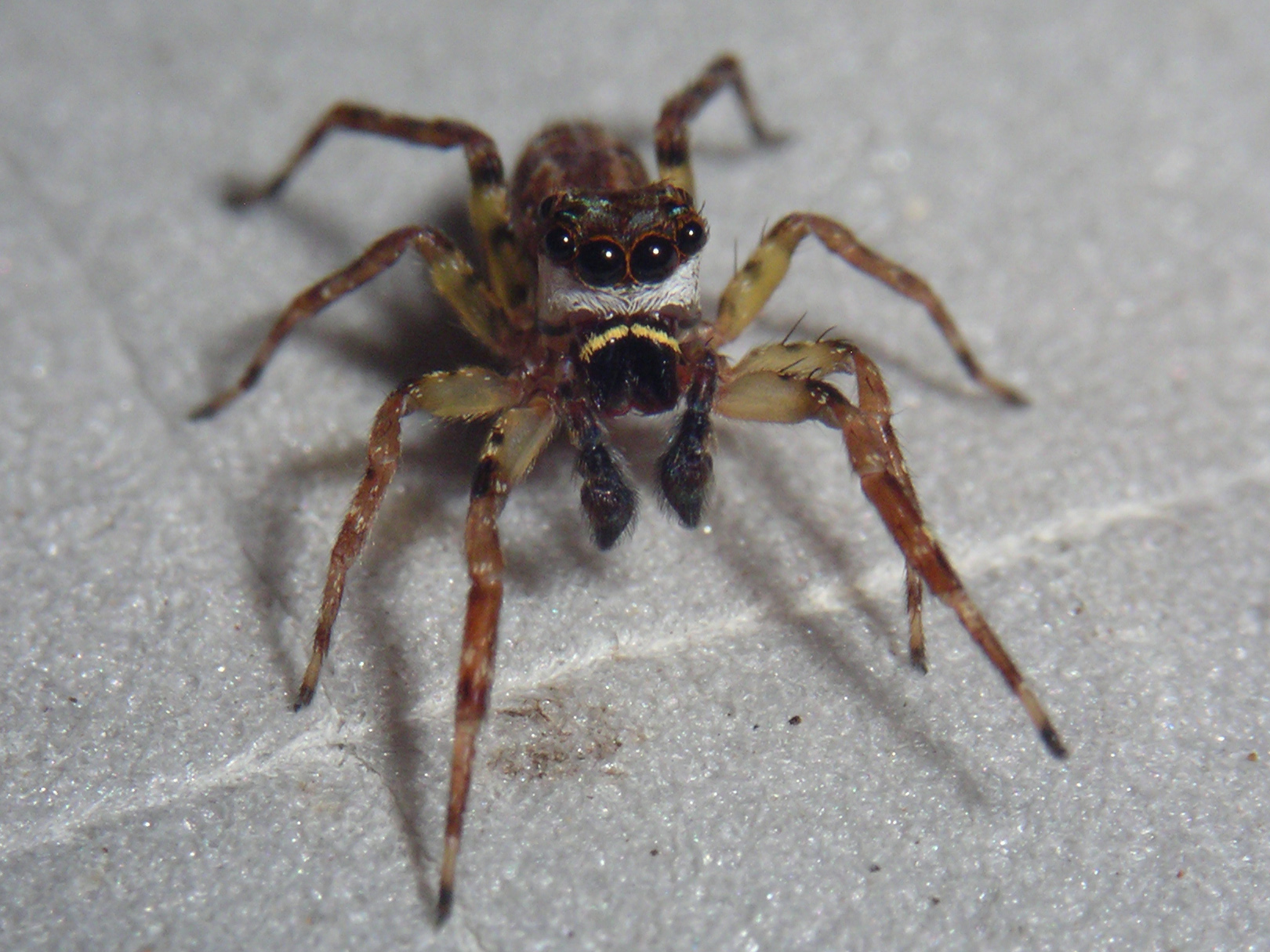
- Male

Scientific classification
- Kingdom: Animalia
- Phylum: Arthropoda
- Subphylum: Chelicerata
- Class: Arachnida
- Order: Araneae
- Infraorder: Araneomorphae
- Family: Salticidae
- Genus: Lapsias
- Species: L. lorax

Binomial name
- Lapsias lorax Maddison, 2012

= Lapsias lorax =

Species of spider

Lapsias lorax male

Lapsias lorax is a species of lapsiine jumping spider from Ecuador.

== Discovery and naming ==
L. lorax was discovered by Wayne Maddison in November 2010 in the Bellavista Cloud Forest Reserve of Ecuador, in a cloud forest at 2,000 metres (6,600 ft) of elevation. It is the first species of the genus Lapsias to be discovered in western South America. The spider discovered by Maddison—an adult male—is the only known specimen of the species. It is about 5 millimetres (0.20 in) in length, and its body is reddish brown in colour. Its face has a big white band across it, and its jaws have diagonal yellow stripes.

From May to August 2011 the Beaty Biodiversity Museum in Vancouver, British Columbia, of which Maddison is the scientific director, held a contest to name the spider. 810 names were submitted, and lorax was ultimately chosen, submitted by Tristan Long, a professor from Wilfrid Laurier University. The name is a reference to the character of the Lorax from Dr. Seuss's book The Lorax, due to its yellow moustache which resembles the stripes on the spider's jaws. As well, The Lorax's environmental message was seen to be appropriate; Maddison commented that "not only is there a resemblance, but it really fits the museum's message."
