= Wanlessia denticulata =

Scientific classification
- Kingdom: Animalia
- Phylum: Arthropoda
- Subphylum: Chelicerata
- Class: Arachnida
- Order: Araneae
- Infraorder: Araneomorphae
- Family: Salticidae
- Genus: Wanlessia
- Species: W. denticulata

Binomial name
- Wanlessia denticulata Peng, Tso & Li, 2002

Species of spider

Wanlessia denticulata is a species of jumping spider.

== Name ==
The specific name is derived from the status of the teeth of the chelicera.

== Distribution ==
Wanlessia denticulata is only known from Taiwan.
