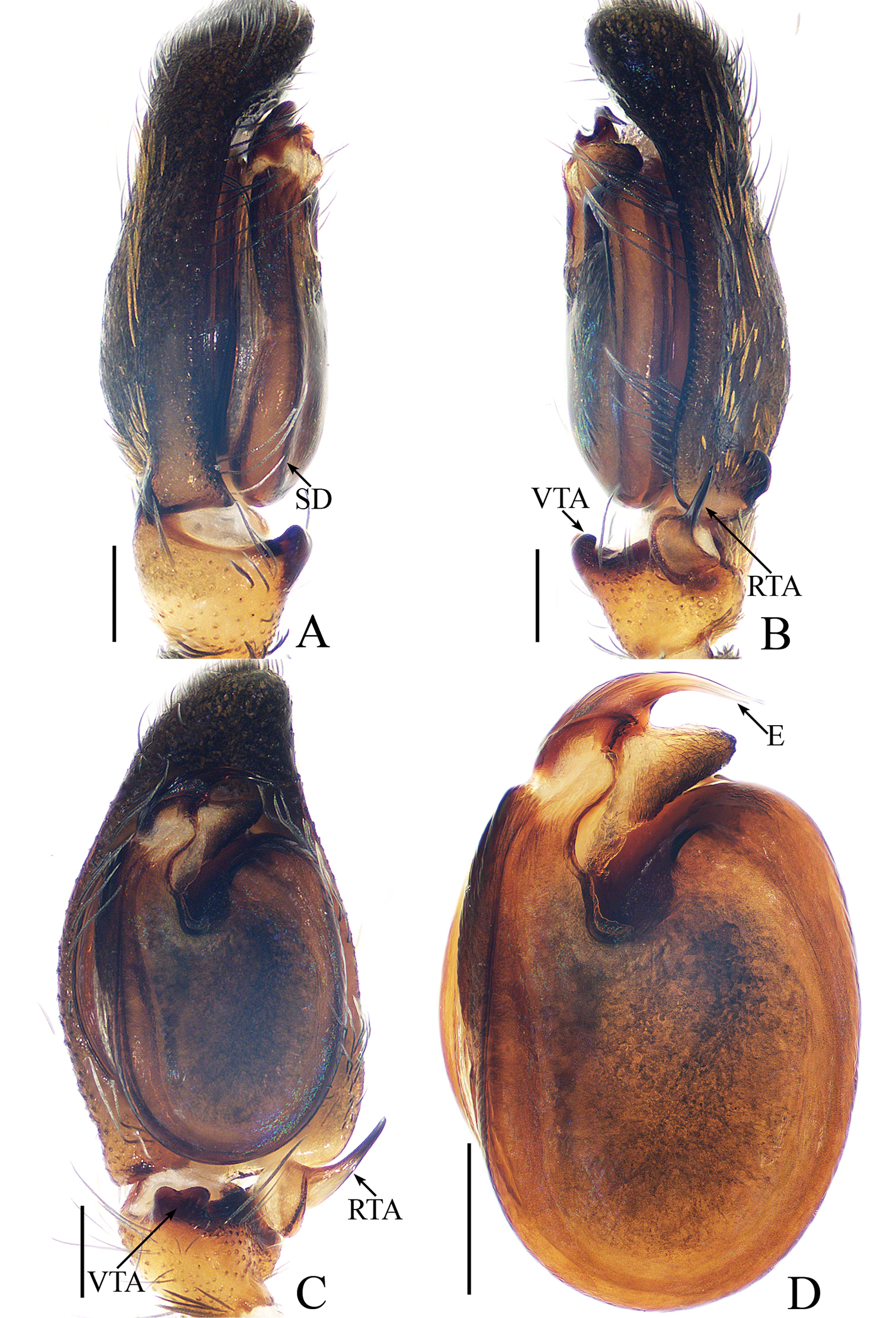
- Gelotia zhengi

Scientific classification
- Kingdom: Animalia
- Phylum: Arthropoda
- Subphylum: Chelicerata
- Class: Arachnida
- Order: Araneae
- Infraorder: Araneomorphae
- Family: Salticidae
- Subfamily: Spartaeinae
- Genus: Gelotia; Thorell, 1890

Type species
- G. frenata Thorell, 1890

Species
- 10, see text

Synonyms
- Codeta Simon, 1900; Policha Thorell, 1892

= Gelotia =

Genus of spiders

Gelotia is a genus of jumping spiders that was first described by Tamerlan Thorell in 1890.

== Species ==
It contains eleven species, found only in Asia and on New Britain:

- Gelotia argenteolimbata (Simon, 1900) – Singapore
- Gelotia bimaculata Thorell, 1890 – Borneo
- Gelotia bouchardi (Simon, 1903) – Indonesia (Sumatra)
- Gelotia frenata Thorell, 1890 (type) – Indonesia (Sumatra)
- Gelotia lanka Wijesinghe, 1991 – Sri Lanka
- Gelotia liuae (Wang & Li, 2020) – China
- Gelotia robusta Wanless, 1984 – Papua New Guinea (New Britain)
- Gelotia salax (Thorell, 1877) – Indonesia (Sulawesi)
- Gelotia syringopalpis Wanless, 1984 – China, Malaysia, Borneo
- Gelotia zhengi Cao & Li, 2016 – China
- Gelotia onoi

Hoang, Phan & Vo, 2024 - Vietnam
