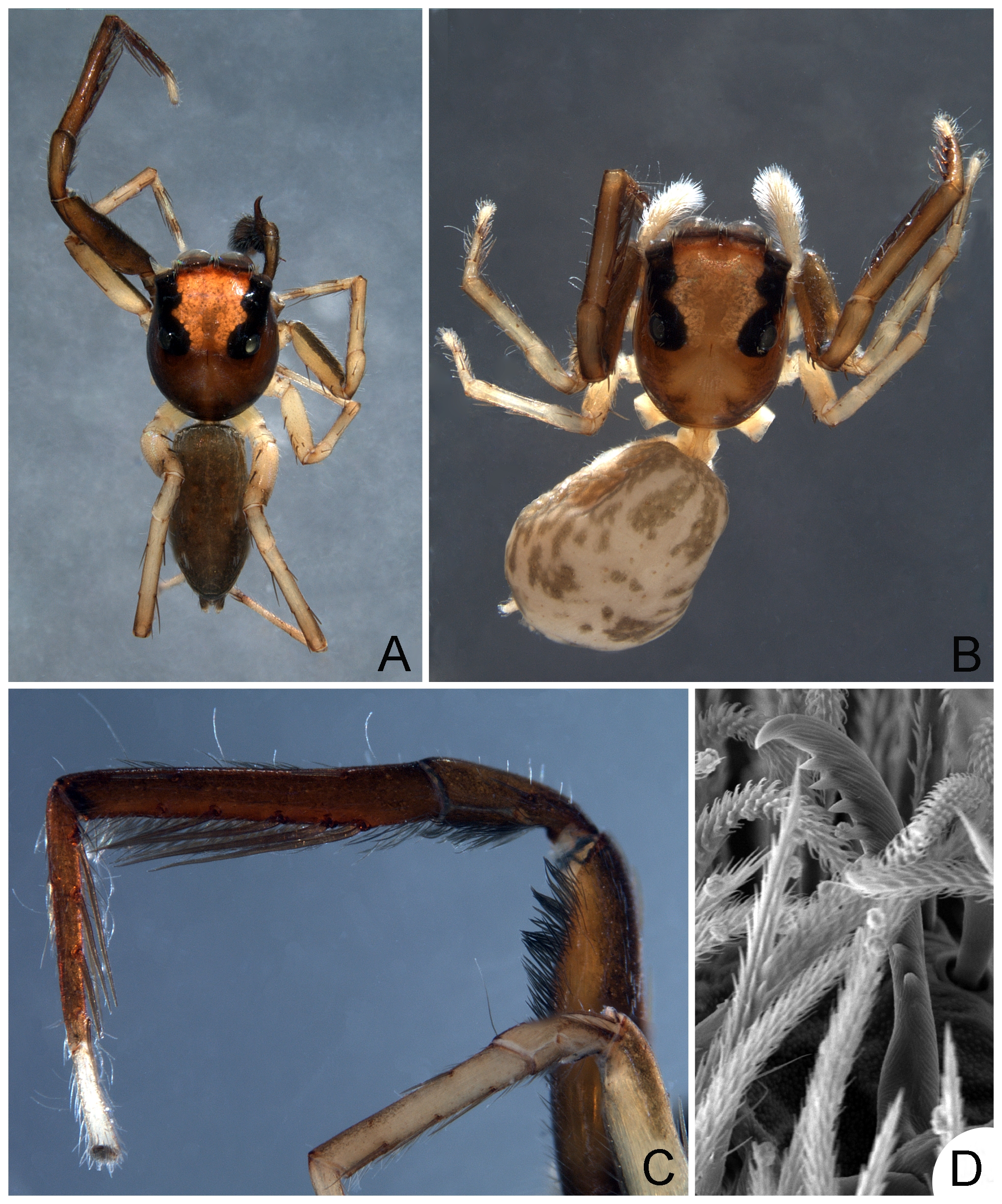
- A. holotype male; B. paratype female; C. male left leg I; D. female palpal claw

Scientific classification
- Kingdom: Animalia
- Phylum: Arthropoda
- Subphylum: Chelicerata
- Class: Arachnida
- Order: Araneae
- Infraorder: Araneomorphae
- Family: Salticidae
- Subfamily: Spartaeinae
- Genus: Lapsamita
- Species: L. maddisoni

Binomial name
- Lapsamita maddisoni Ruiz, 2013

= Lapsamita =

Genus of spiders

Lapsamita is a genus of spiders in the family Salticidae. It was first described in 2013 by Ruiz. As of 2017, it contains only one Brazilian species, Lapsamita maddisoni.
