= Wanlessia sedgwicki =

Scientific classification
- Kingdom: Animalia
- Phylum: Arthropoda
- Subphylum: Chelicerata
- Class: Arachnida
- Order: Araneae
- Infraorder: Araneomorphae
- Family: Salticidae
- Genus: Wanlessia
- Species: W. sedgwicki

Binomial name
- Wanlessia sedgwicki Wijesinghe, 1992

Species of spider

Wanlessia sedgwicki is a species of jumping spider that is endemic to northwestern Borneo.

Males have a body length of 3.2 mm. The carapace is dark yellowish brown.

== Name ==
The species name honors Walter Sedgwick, the collector of the holotype.
