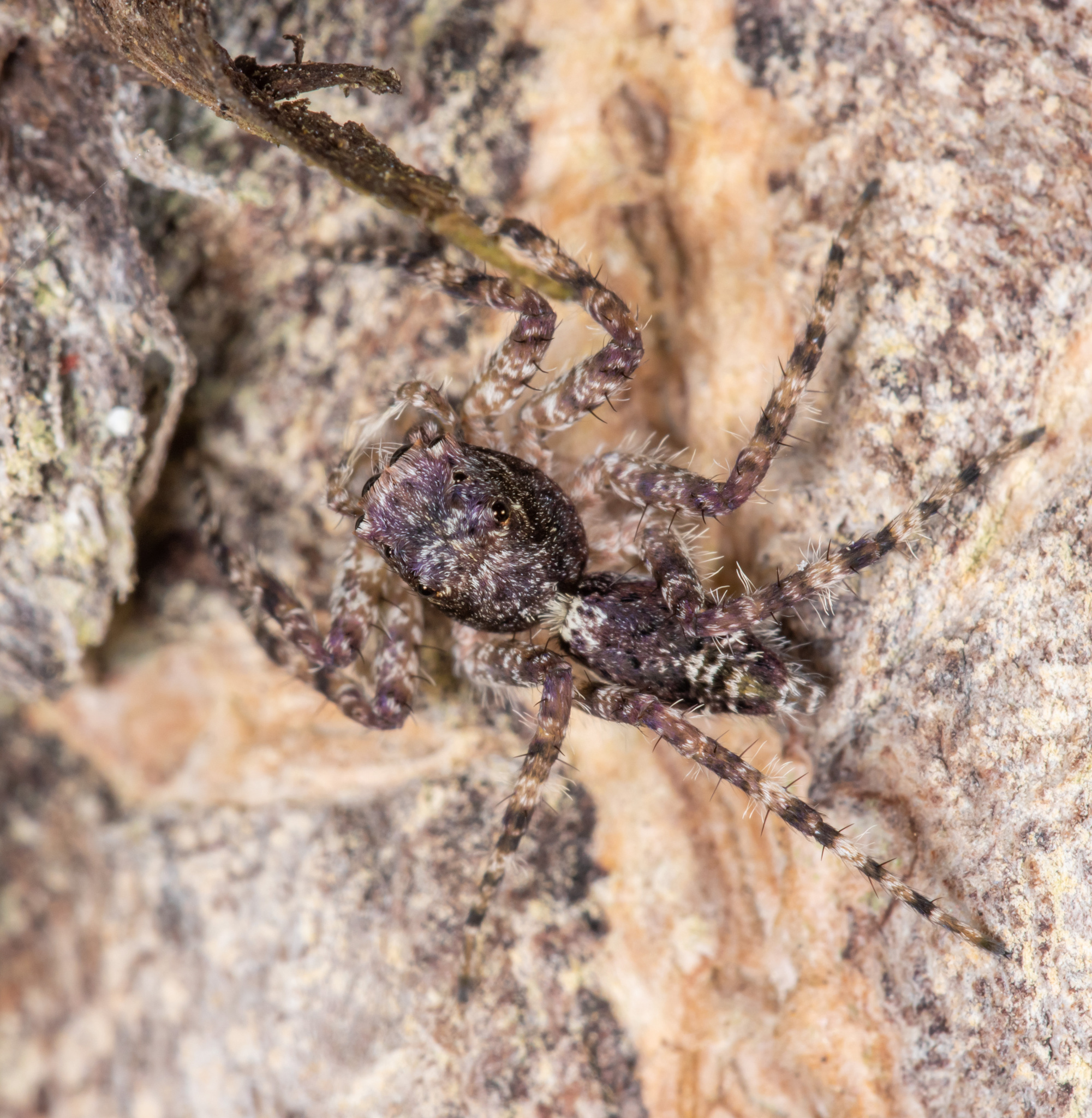
- Mintonia sp. from Sumatra

Scientific classification
- Kingdom: Animalia
- Phylum: Arthropoda
- Subphylum: Chelicerata
- Class: Arachnida
- Order: Araneae
- Infraorder: Araneomorphae
- Family: Salticidae
- Subfamily: Spartaeinae
- Genus: Mintonia; Wanless, 1984

Type species
- M. tauricornis Wanless, 1984

Species
- 10, see text

= Mintonia =

Genus of spiders

Mintonia is a genus of Southeast Asian jumping spiders that was first described by F. R. Wanless in 1984.

== Species ==
As of July 2019 it contains ten species, found in Malaysia, Singapore, Thailand, and Indonesia:

- Mintonia breviramis Wanless, 1984 – Borneo
- Mintonia caliginosa Wanless, 1987 – Borneo
- Mintonia ignota Logunov & Azarkina, 2008 – Thailand
- Mintonia mackiei Wanless, 1984 – Borneo
- Mintonia melinauensis Wanless, 1984 – Borneo
- Mintonia nubilis Wanless, 1984 – Borneo
- Mintonia protuberans Wanless, 1984 – Singapore
- Mintonia ramipalpis (Thorell, 1890) – Indonesia (Java, Sumatra, Borneo)
- Mintonia silvicola Wanless, 1987 – Malaysia
- Mintonia tauricornis Wanless, 1984 (type) – Indonesia (Sumatra, Borneo)
