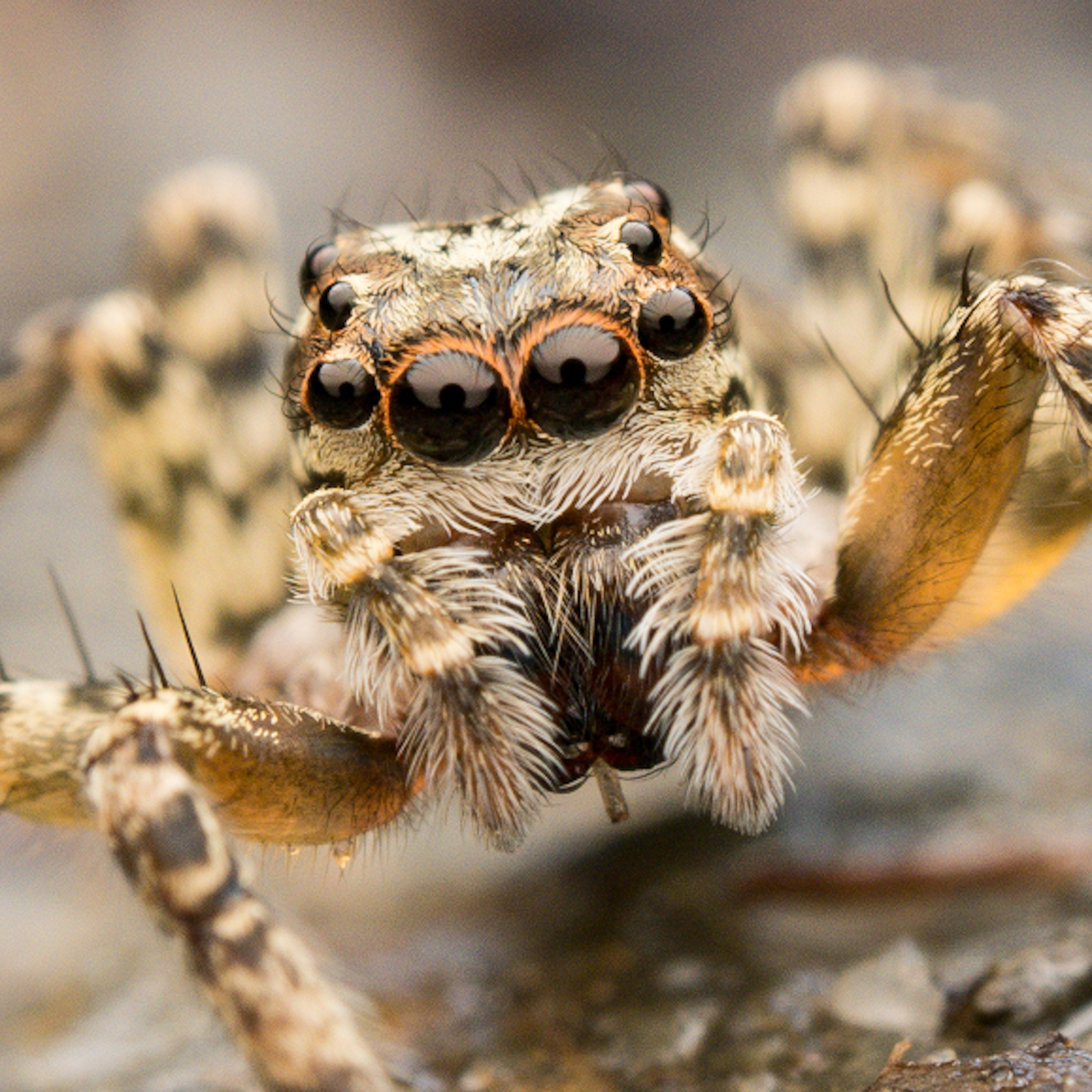
- Yaginumanis sexdentatus

Scientific classification
- Kingdom: Animalia
- Phylum: Arthropoda
- Subphylum: Chelicerata
- Class: Arachnida
- Order: Araneae
- Infraorder: Araneomorphae
- Family: Salticidae
- Subfamily: Spartaeinae
- Genus: Yaginumanis; Wanless, 1984

Type species
- Y. sexdentatus (Yaginuma, 1967)

Species
- Y. cheni Peng & Li, 2002 – China; Y. sexdentatus (Yaginuma, 1967) – Japan; Y. wanlessi Zhang & Li, 2005 – China

= Yaginumanis =

Genus of spiders

Yaginumanis is a genus of East Asian jumping spiders that was erected by F. R. Wanless in 1984. It is named in honor of Japanese arachnologist Takeo Yaginuma, who described the type species in 1984.

== Species ==
The following species are recognised in the genus Yaginumanis:

- Yaginumanis cheni Peng & Li, 2002 - China
- Yaginumanis sexdentatus (Yaginuma, 1967) - Japan
- Yaginumanis wanlessi Zhang & Li, 2005 - China
- Yaginumanis yuanwencai K. Liu, 2025 - China
