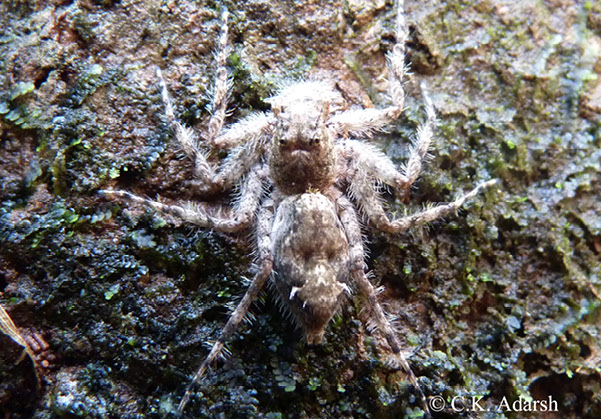
- Phaeacius lancearius

Scientific classification
- Kingdom: Animalia
- Phylum: Arthropoda
- Subphylum: Chelicerata
- Class: Arachnida
- Order: Araneae
- Infraorder: Araneomorphae
- Family: Salticidae
- Subfamily: Spartaeinae
- Genus: Phaeacius; Thorell, 1891

Type species
- Phaeacius fimbriatus Simon, 1900

Species
- See text.

= Phaeacius =

Genus of spiders

Phaeacius is a spider genus of the family Salticidae (jumping spiders), found in sub-tropical China and between India and the Malay Peninsula, including Sri Lanka, Sumatra and the Philippines. Although other spiders can jump, salticids including Phaeacius have significantly better vision than other spiders, and their main eyes are more acute in daylight than a cat's and 10 times more acute than a dragonfly's. The main eyes focus accurately on an object at distances from approximately 2 centimetres (0.79 in) to infinity, and in practice can see up to about 75 centimetres (30 in). They do not spin webs.

While most jumping spiders are active hunters, Phaeacius is unusually sedentary, generally resting in its unusual flattened pose for hours or days on logs, tree trunks, pieces of wood or any other solid surface, where it is very well camouflaged. Its preferred prey is moths and other insects, and jumping spiders. Insects can usually move around an inactive Phaeacius, or even over its body, but if the insect moves between the spider's first pair of legs, Phaeacius lunges extremely quickly to bite the prey. Sometimes Phaeacius takes a more active approach, especially if without prey for a week or more. Phaeacius does not enter webs voluntary, and moves away if it touches one accidentally. It can bite through the threads and pull strongly with its legs, but cannot escape from very sticky webs.

The genera Portia and Spartaeus are closely related to Phaeacius.

== Description ==
The whole body of Phaeacius is 7.5 to 11.5 millimetres (0.30 to 0.45 in) long, and notably flattened, including the carapace, while the carapaces of some other groups are raised. The cephalothorax of Phaeacius′ is relatively long, and the highest point is a little behind the last pair of eyes. Phaeacius is very well camouflaged; for example, P. malayensis has a body with dull grey and brown markings that resemble the surface of tree trunks in the rainforest.

== Senses ==
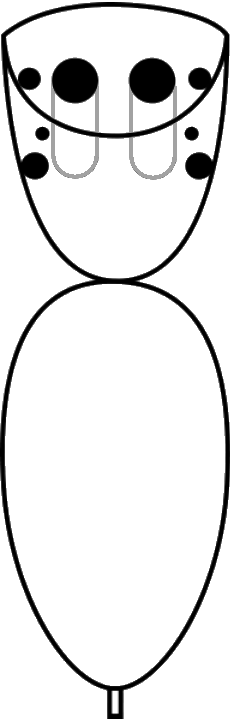
Eye pattern of jumping spiders on "squared-off" cephalothorax

Jumping spiders have eight eyes, the two large ones in the centre-and-front position (the anterior-median eyes, also called "principal eyes") providing acute vision and housed in tubes in the head. The other six are secondary eyes, positioned along the sides of the carapace and acting mainly as movement detectors. While the middle pair of secondary eyes in most jumping spiders are small, those of Phaeacius and other members of the sub-family Spartaeinae are almost as large as the other secondary eyes. Although other spiders can jump, salticids including Phaeacius have significantly better vision than other spiders, and their main eyes are more acute in daylight than a cat's and 10 times more acute than a dragonfly's. The main eyes focus accurately on an object at distances from approximately 2 centimetres (0.79 in) to infinity, and in practice can see up to about 75 centimetres (30 in).

Spiders, like other arthropods, have sensors, often modified setae (bristles), protruding through their cuticle ("skin") for smell, taste, touch and vibration. Unlike insects, spiders and other chelicerates do not have antennae.

== Movement and being undetected ==
While most jumping spiders walk quickly, in a stop-go gait and jumping over obstacles, the movements of Phaeacius are very unusual. Phaeacius usually uses a "flattened posture" head-down on a vertical surface, with the body, legs and palps pressed against the surface, the hindmost legs upwards and the other legs downwards, and its markings and flattened body make it easily hidden against the bark of a tree trunk. Its habit of walking with its body and legs flattened against a surface helps Phaeacius to be unobtrusive.

== Feeding and defence ==
While almost all jumping spiders are predators, mostly preying on insects, on other spiders, and on other arthropods, Phaeacius does not use the usual hunting tactics. Most jumping spiders walk throughout the day, so that they maximise their chances of a catch, and jump on their prey and then bite it. Unlike most jumping spiders, Phaeacius and other spartaeines do not leap on prey, but lunge from about half the predator's body length away.

Phaeacius is unusually sedentary for a jumping spider, generally resting in the flattened pose for hours or days on logs, pieces of wood or any other solid surface, and captures particular types of prey more often when the predator matches this background. Insects can usually move around an inactive Phaeacius, or even over its body or legs. However, if the insect moves between the spider's first pair of legs, Phaeacius lunges extremely quickly, driving its body upward 2 to 3 millimetres (0.079 to 0.118 in) and forward about half the length of its body. The lunge ends with the spider's fangs in the prey and often with the foremost two pairs of legs forming a basket over the prey. When the prey stops struggling, Phaeacius resumes the flattened pose and then feeds.

However, Phaeacius can adopt other, more active approaches, with different gaits for each. If an insect remains almost stationary while Phaeacius is in the flattened pose and facing the insect, the spider may step slowly forward to its prey, rocking and keeping its flattened pose. To rock, Phaeacius moves about half a body length forward then, without pausing, smoothly back almost to the previous position. It performs about 10 cycles of those movements, progressing by 1 to 2 millimetres (0.039 to 0.079 in) per cycle, and then rests. This rocking motion may disguise Phaeacius as shadows on the tree trunk. The insect occasionally keeps stationary until Phaeacius reaches within about half a body length and then lunges.

When hunting other jumping spiders and when the background matches its coloration, Phaeacius uses "insinuation", in which it waits, sometimes up to an hour, while a jumping spider moves around nearby, and then Phaeacius suddenly turns up to 180° toward the prey and then resumes the flattened pose. Phaeacius then moves a few millimetres toward the prey and resumes the flattened pose. If the prey moves away, Phaeacius continues the insinuation manoeuvre, but if the prey moves toward it, Phaeacius lunges. Other jumping spiders show no awareness of a flattened Phaeacius on a matching background, and apparently survive by luck. When the background does not matches Phaeacius′ coloration, other jumping spiders recognise Phaeacius as a threat.

Sometimes, especially if without prey for a week or more, Phaeacius may approach insects faster, from 50 to 100 millimetres (2.0 to 3.9 in) away, and if necessary turning round to face the prey. Often Phaeacius then adopts the flattened pose after the turn, but sometimes it walks faster than usual and, without pausing, lunges from about half its body length.

In a test on a background matching its own coloration, Phaeacius was most successful against other salticids and then against moths, and was also successful against flies and hunting spiders. On a non-matching background, Phaeacius was most successful against moths.

Phaeacius does not try to eat other spiders' eggs, does not enter webs voluntarily, and moves away if it touches one accidentally. It can bite through the threads and pull strongly with its legs, but cannot escape from very sticky webs. This behaviour is quite different from that of its close relative, Portia, which hunts actively and can enter any type of web to catch spiders and their eggs.

When disturbed, some jumping spiders usually run away quickly and leap if chased. Phaeacius stays in its flattened posture unless harassed, when it runs quickly for about 100 to 300 millimetres (3.9 to 11.8 in) and then adopts the flattened posture, and finally walks away about 10 minutes later.

== Reproduction ==
Before courtship, male spiders spin a small web and ejaculate on to it, and then store the semen in reservoirs on his pedipalps, which are larger than those of females. Phaeacius spins a flimsy silken, horizontal or vertical platform, about twice the spider's length in diameter, to moult and lay eggs, but not at other times. After the moult, Phaeacius leaves the discarded exuvia hanging from the platform. A female's egg sac is placed in a shallow cavity on the surface of a log.

== Taxonomy and distribution ==
Phaeacius is a spider genus of the family Salticidae (jumping spiders). Phaeacius is in the subfamily Spartaeinae, which is thought to be primitive. Molecular phylogeny, a technique that compares the DNA of organisms to reconstruct the tree of life, indicates that Phaeacius is a member of the tribe Spartaeini, that Spartaeinae is basal (quite similar to the ancestors of all jumping spiders), and that Phaeacius is closely related to Portia and Spartaeus.

The genus is found in subtropical China and between India and Malaya, including Sri Lanka, Sumatra and the Philippines.

== Species ==
- Phaeacius alabangensis Wijesinghe, 1991 – Philippines
- Phaeacius azarkinae Prószyński & Deeleman-Reinhold, 2010 – Sumbawa
- Phaeacius biramosus Wijesinghe, 1991 – Sumatra
- Phaeacius canalis Wanless, 1981 – Philippines
- Phaeacius fimbriatus Simon, 1900 – Nepal, Java
- Phaeacius hampi Freudenschuss & Seiter, 2016 – Philippines
- Phaeacius lancearius (Thorell, 1895) – India, Myanmar
- Phaeacius leytensis Wijesinghe, 1991 – Philippines
- Phaeacius mainitensis Barrion & Litsinger, 1995 – Philippines
- Phaeacius malayensis Wanless, 1981 – China, Malaysia, Singapore, Sumatra
- Phaeacius saxicola Wanless, 1981 – Nepal
- Phaeacius wanlessi Wijesinghe, 1991 – Nepal, Sri Lanka
- Phaeacius yixin Zhang & Li, 2005 – China
- Phaeacius yunnanensis Peng & Kim, 1998 – China
