= Cocalus =

Cocalus is also a genus of jumping spiders.

In Greek mythology, Cocalus (Ancient Greek: Κώκαλος, romanized: Kṓkalos) is a king of Camicus (Ancient Greek: Καμικός, romanized: Kamikós) in the island of Sicily, according to Greek author Diodorus Siculus. According to the Epitome of the Philippic History of Pompeius Trogus, he became king of Sicily after the extinction of the Cyclopes.

== Myth ==
After the escape of Daedalus and his son Icarus from King Minos's imprisonment, and the subsequent death of Icarus, Daedalus arrived in Sicily, where he was welcomed by Cocalus. Minos was, however, determined to find Daedalus, and he travelled from city to city offering a challenge: he presented a spiral seashell and asked for it to be strung all the way through. When he reached Camicus, Cocalus, knowing that Daedalus would be able to solve the puzzle, showed it to him. Daedalus tied the thread to an ant, which walked through the seashell, stringing it all the way through.

Minos then knew Daedalus was sheltering in the court of Cocalus, and demanded that he be handed over. Cocalus managed to convince him to take a bath first, and then, Daedalus killed Minos with boiling hot water.
