= Depreissia =

Scientific classification
- Kingdom: Animalia
- Phylum: Arthropoda
- Subphylum: Chelicerata
- Class: Arachnida
- Order: Araneae
- Infraorder: Araneomorphae
- Family: Salticidae
- Subfamily: Spartaeinae
- Genus: Depreissia; Lessert, 1942

Type species
- D. myrmex Lessert, 1942

Species
- D. decipiens Deeleman-Reinhold & Floren, 2003 – Borneo; D. myrmex Lessert, 1942 – Congo

Genus of spiders

Depreissia is a genus of jumping spiders that was first described by R. de Lessert in 1942. As of June 2019 it contains only two species, found only in the Congo and on Borneo: D. decipiens and D. myrmex.
