= Taraxella =

Scientific classification
- Kingdom: Animalia
- Phylum: Arthropoda
- Subphylum: Chelicerata
- Class: Arachnida
- Order: Araneae
- Infraorder: Araneomorphae
- Family: Salticidae
- Subfamily: Spartaeinae
- Genus: Taraxella; Wanless, 1984

Type species
- T. solitaria Wanless, 1984

Species
- 5, see text

Genus of spiders

Taraxella is a genus of Southeast Asian jumping spiders that was first described by F. R. Wanless in 1984.

== Species ==
As of August 2019 it contains five species, found only in Indonesia and Malaysia:

- Taraxella hillyardi Wanless, 1987 – Malaysia
- Taraxella petrensis Wanless, 1987 – Indonesia (Sumatra)
- Taraxella reinholdae Wanless, 1987 – Borneo
- Taraxella solitaria Wanless, 1984 (type) – Borneo
- Taraxella sumatrana Wanless, 1987 – Indonesia (Sumatra)
