= Yamangalea =

Scientific classification
- Kingdom: Animalia
- Phylum: Arthropoda
- Subphylum: Chelicerata
- Class: Arachnida
- Order: Araneae
- Infraorder: Araneomorphae
- Family: Salticidae
- Subfamily: Spartaeinae
- Genus: Yamangalea; Maddison, 2009

Type species
- Y. frewana Maddison, 2009

Species
- Y. frewana Maddison, 2009 – New Guinea; Y. lubinae Zabka, 2012 – Australia (Queensland)

Genus of spiders

Yamangalea is a genus of South Pacific jumping spiders that was first described by Wayne Paul Maddison in 2009. As of September 2019 it contains two species, found in Australia and Papua New Guinea: Y. frewana and Y. lubinae.
