= Allococalodes cornutus =

Scientific classification
- Kingdom: Animalia
- Phylum: Arthropoda
- Subphylum: Chelicerata
- Class: Arachnida
- Order: Araneae
- Infraorder: Araneomorphae
- Family: Salticidae
- Genus: Allococalodes
- Species: A. cornutus

Binomial name
- Allococalodes cornutus Wanless, 1982

Species of spider

Allococalodes cornutus is a species of jumping spider (family Salticidae) endemic to New Guinea.

Male Allococalodes cornutus measures about 4.8 mm (0.19 in) in total length.
