= Meleon =

Scientific classification
- Kingdom: Animalia
- Phylum: Arthropoda
- Subphylum: Chelicerata
- Class: Arachnida
- Order: Araneae
- Infraorder: Araneomorphae
- Family: Salticidae
- Subfamily: Spartaeinae
- Genus: Meleon; Wanless, 1984

Type species
- M. kenti (Lessert, 1925)

Species
- 8, see text

Genus of spiders

Meleon is an African genus of jumping spiders that was first described by F. R. Wanless in 1984.

== Species ==
As of October 2025, this genus includes eight species:

- Meleon guineensis (Berland & Millot, 1941) – Guinea, Ivory Coast, DR Congo, Uganda
- Meleon insulanus Logunov & Azarkina, 2008 – Madagascar
- Meleon kenti (Lessert, 1925) – Angola, Southern Africa (type species)
- Meleon madagascarensis (Wanless, 1978) – Madagascar
- Meleon raharizonina Logunov & Azarkina, 2008 – Madagascar
- Meleon russata (Simon, 1900) – Madagascar
- Meleon solitaria (Lessert, 1927) – West, Central, East Africa
- Meleon tsaratanana Logunov & Azarkina, 2008 – Madagascar
