= Tabuina =

Scientific classification
- Kingdom: Animalia
- Phylum: Arthropoda
- Subphylum: Chelicerata
- Class: Arachnida
- Order: Araneae
- Infraorder: Araneomorphae
- Family: Salticidae
- Subfamily: Spartaeinae
- Genus: Tabuina; Maddison, 2009

Type species
- T. varirata Maddison, 2009

Species
- T. baiteta Maddison, 2009 – New Guinea; T. rufa Maddison, 2009 – New Guinea; T. varirata Maddison, 2009 – New Guinea

Genus of spiders

Tabuina is a genus of Papuan jumping spiders that was first described by Wayne Paul Maddison in 2009. As of August 2019 it contains only three species, found only in Papua New Guinea: T. baiteta, T. rufa, and T. varirata.
