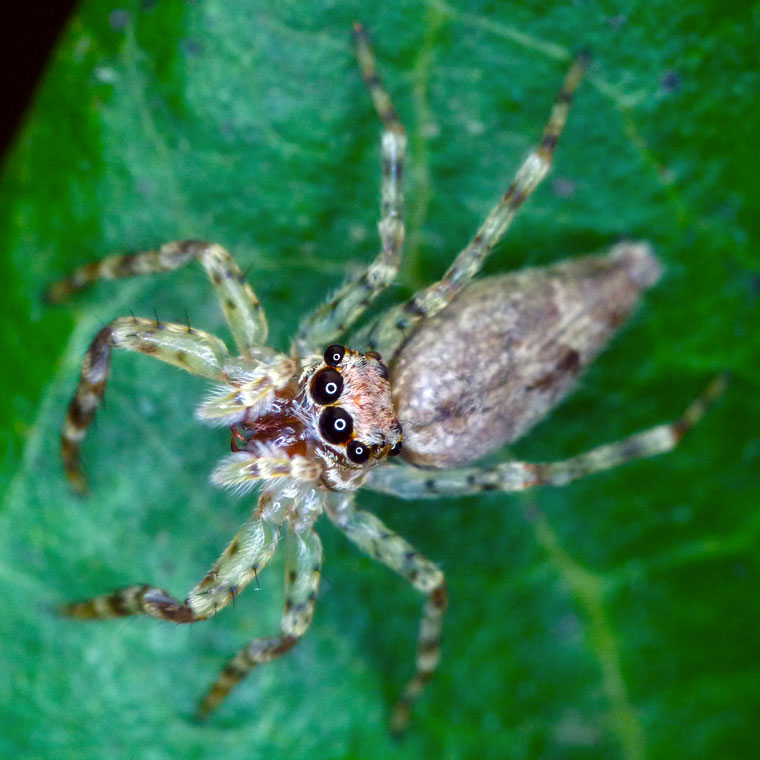
- Female
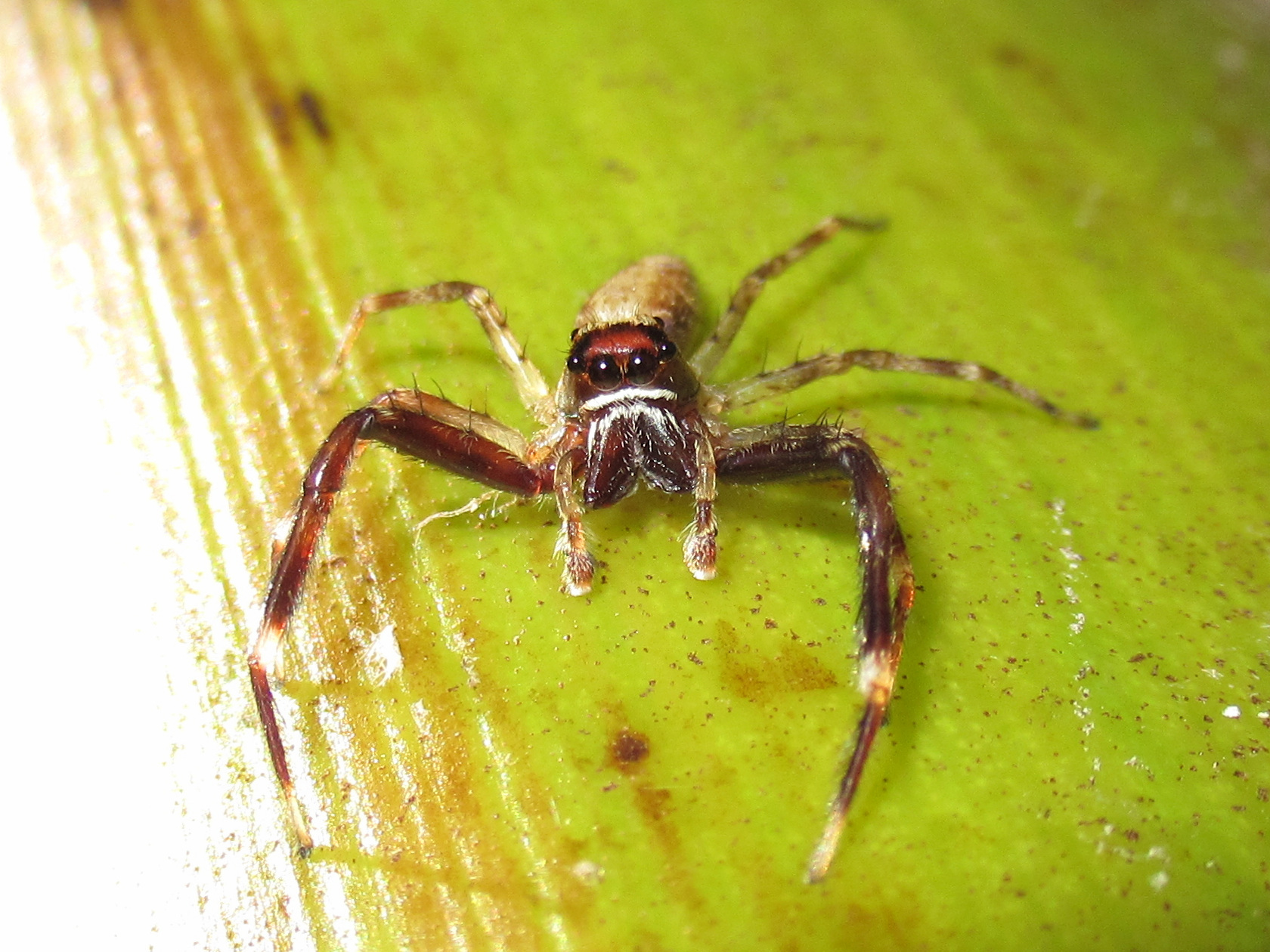
- Male

Scientific classification
- Kingdom: Animalia
- Phylum: Arthropoda
- Subphylum: Chelicerata
- Class: Arachnida
- Order: Araneae
- Infraorder: Araneomorphae
- Family: Salticidae
- Genus: Helpis
- Species: H. minitabunda

Binomial name
- Helpis minitabunda L.Koch 1880

Synonyms
- Astia repersa L.Koch; Astia minitabunda L.Koch

= Helpis minitabunda =

Species of spider

Helpis minitabunda is a species of jumping spider in the family Salticidae, widespread throughout Australia, New Zealand, and Papua New Guinea. These spiders are typically found amongst foliage in moist areas.

== Etymology and common names ==
Common names for H. mintabunda include the threatening jumping spider and bronze jumping spider.

The specific Latin epithet, minitabunda – meaning "threatening" – refers to defensive behaviours exhibited by males of the species when approached or attacked.

== Appearance, behaviour and mating ==
Unlike most spiders, males are larger than females; males can grow up to 10 mm in body length, whereas mature females may be up to 8 mm long.

H. mintabunda, like other Saticidae (and most Arachnids), exhibit sexual dimorphism, both physically and behaviourally: in particular, the front pair of legs are characteristically longer and darker in colour in males than in females, and the male's head – or "caput" – is noticeably flat-topped and covered in creamy white hairs, which continue onto the upper surface of their large and more prominent chelicerae – a feature unique to males.

Males are more active and aggressive hunters, noted for their speed and agility, often preying on smaller spiders, while females are more cryptic.

The pre-mating courtship dance between males and females of the species has been observed to last between two and three hours.

== Distribution ==
H. mintabunda are commonly observed in the East and Southeastern regions of Australia, while they are listed as an invasive species in New Zealand.
