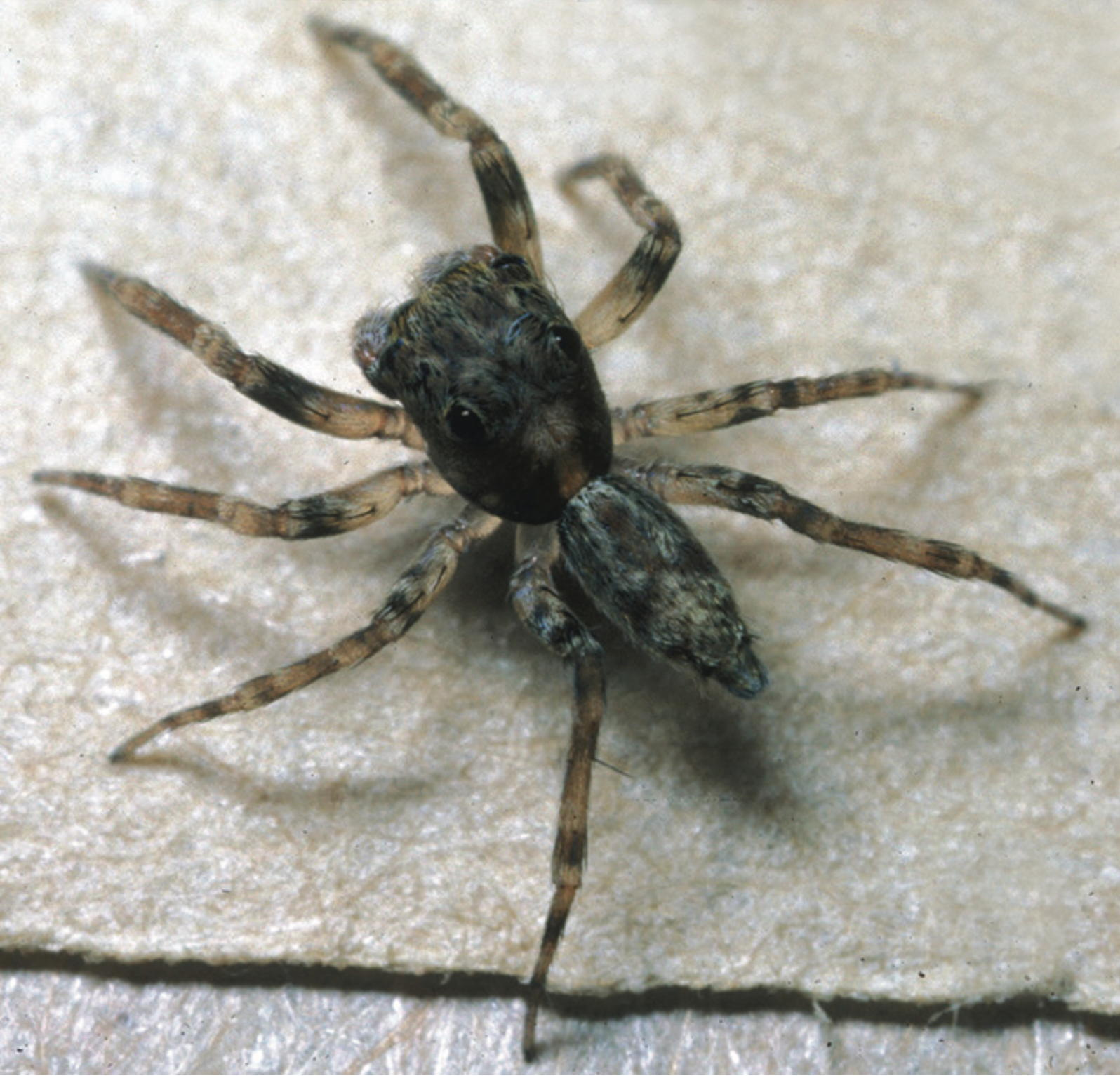
- Amilaps mayana

Scientific classification
- Kingdom: Animalia
- Phylum: Arthropoda
- Subphylum: Chelicerata
- Class: Arachnida
- Order: Araneae
- Infraorder: Araneomorphae
- Family: Salticidae
- Genus: Amilaps; Maddison, 2019
- Species: A. mayana

Binomial name
- Amilaps mayana Maddison, 2019

= Amilaps =

Genus of jumping spiders

Amilaps is a monotypic genus of jumping spiders containing the single species, Amilaps mayana. It was first described in 2019 by Wayne Maddison, who originally collected the type specimen in 1983 in Teapa, Mexico. The genus was tentatively placed in the tribe Lapsiini, a division of the subfamily Spartaeinae.

== See also ==
- List of Salticidae genera
