= Helpis foelixi =

Scientific classification
- Kingdom: Animalia
- Phylum: Arthropoda
- Subphylum: Chelicerata
- Class: Arachnida
- Order: Araneae
- Infraorder: Araneomorphae
- Family: Salticidae
- Genus: Helpis
- Species: H. foelixi

Binomial name
- Helpis foelixi Zabka & Patoleta, 2014
- Holotype site (QM S90797): Cooloola, QLD

Species of spider

Helpis foelixi is a jumping spider ( that is, a member of the Salticidae family), first described in 2014 by Marek Zabka and Barbara Patoleta, from a male specimen only. The species epithet, foelixi, honours the Swiss arachnologist, Rainer F. Foelix.

It is known only from the holotype site at the edge of Lake Poona, Cooloola Queensland.
