= Cucudeta =

Scientific classification
- Kingdom: Animalia
- Phylum: Arthropoda
- Subphylum: Chelicerata
- Class: Arachnida
- Order: Araneae
- Infraorder: Araneomorphae
- Family: Salticidae
- Subfamily: Spartaeinae
- Genus: Cucudeta; Maddison, 2009

Type species
- C. zabkai Maddison, 2009

Species
- C. gahavisuka Maddison, 2009 – New Guinea; C. uzet Maddison, 2009 – New Guinea; C. zabkai Maddison, 2009 – New Guinea

Genus of spiders

Cucudeta is a genus of Papuan jumping spiders that was first described by Wayne Paul Maddison in 2009. As of June 2019 it contains only three species, found only in Papua New Guinea: C. gahavisuka, C. uzet, and C. zabkai.
