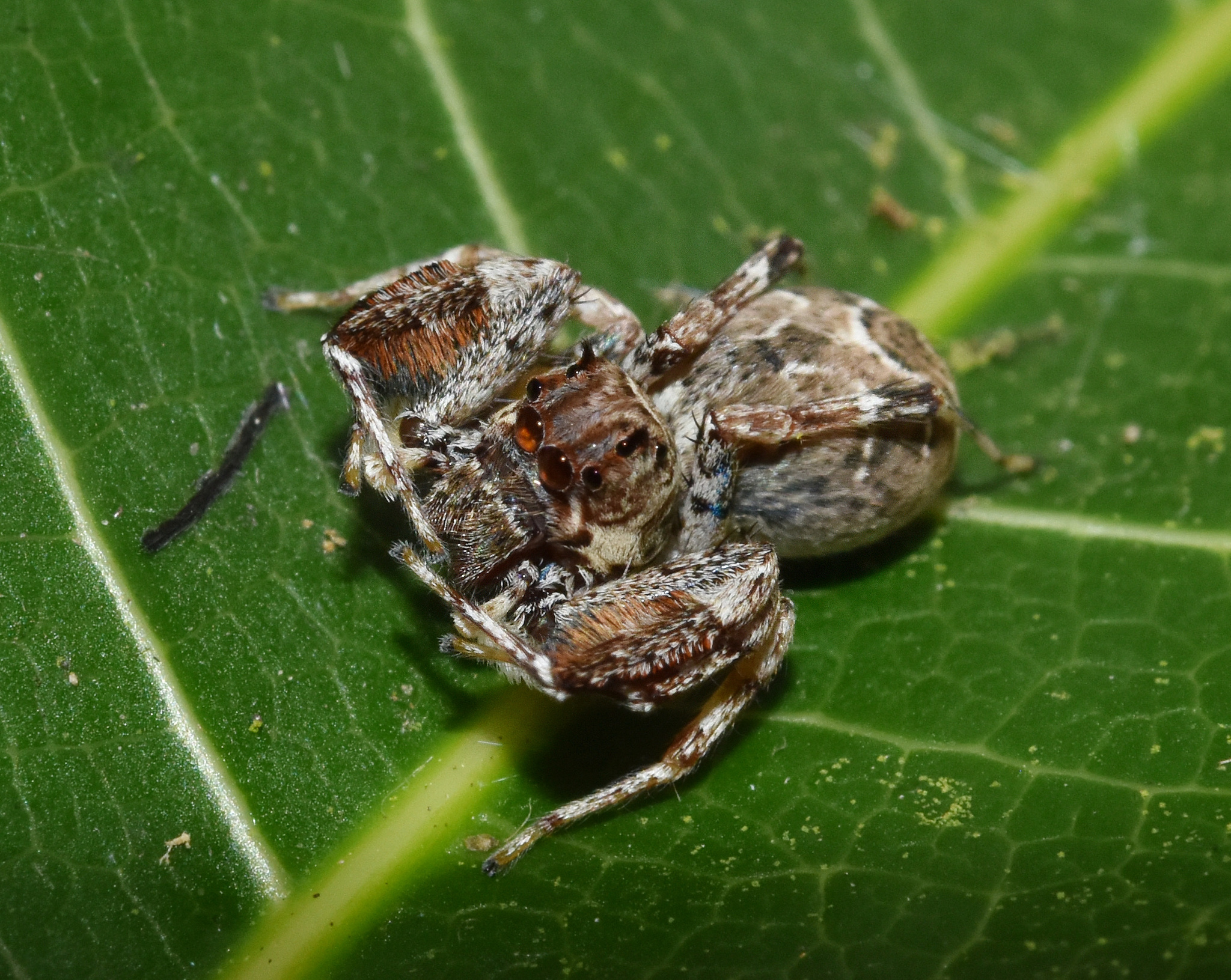
- Female V. durbani
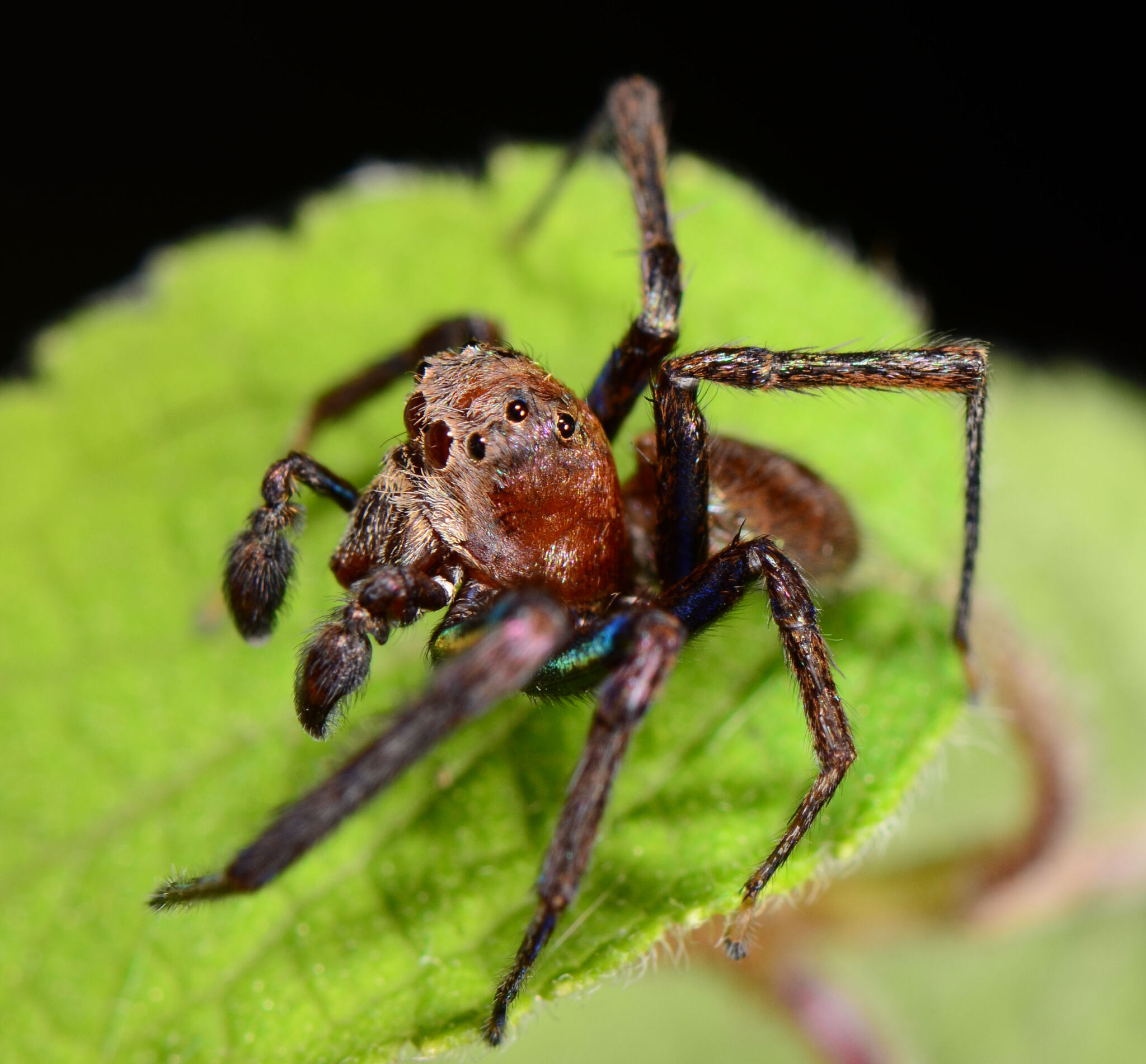
- Male V. durbani

Scientific classification
- Kingdom: Animalia
- Phylum: Arthropoda
- Subphylum: Chelicerata
- Class: Arachnida
- Order: Araneae
- Infraorder: Araneomorphae
- Family: Salticidae
- Subfamily: Spartaeinae
- Genus: Veissella; Wanless, 1984

Type species
- V. durbani (Peckham & Peckham, 1903)

Species
- V. durbani (Peckham & Peckham, 1903); V. milloti Logunov & Azarkina, 2008

= Veissella =

Genus of spiders

Veissella is a genus of African jumping spiders that was first described by F. R. Wanless in 1984.

"The genus name is an arbitrary combination of letters; the gender is considered feminine".

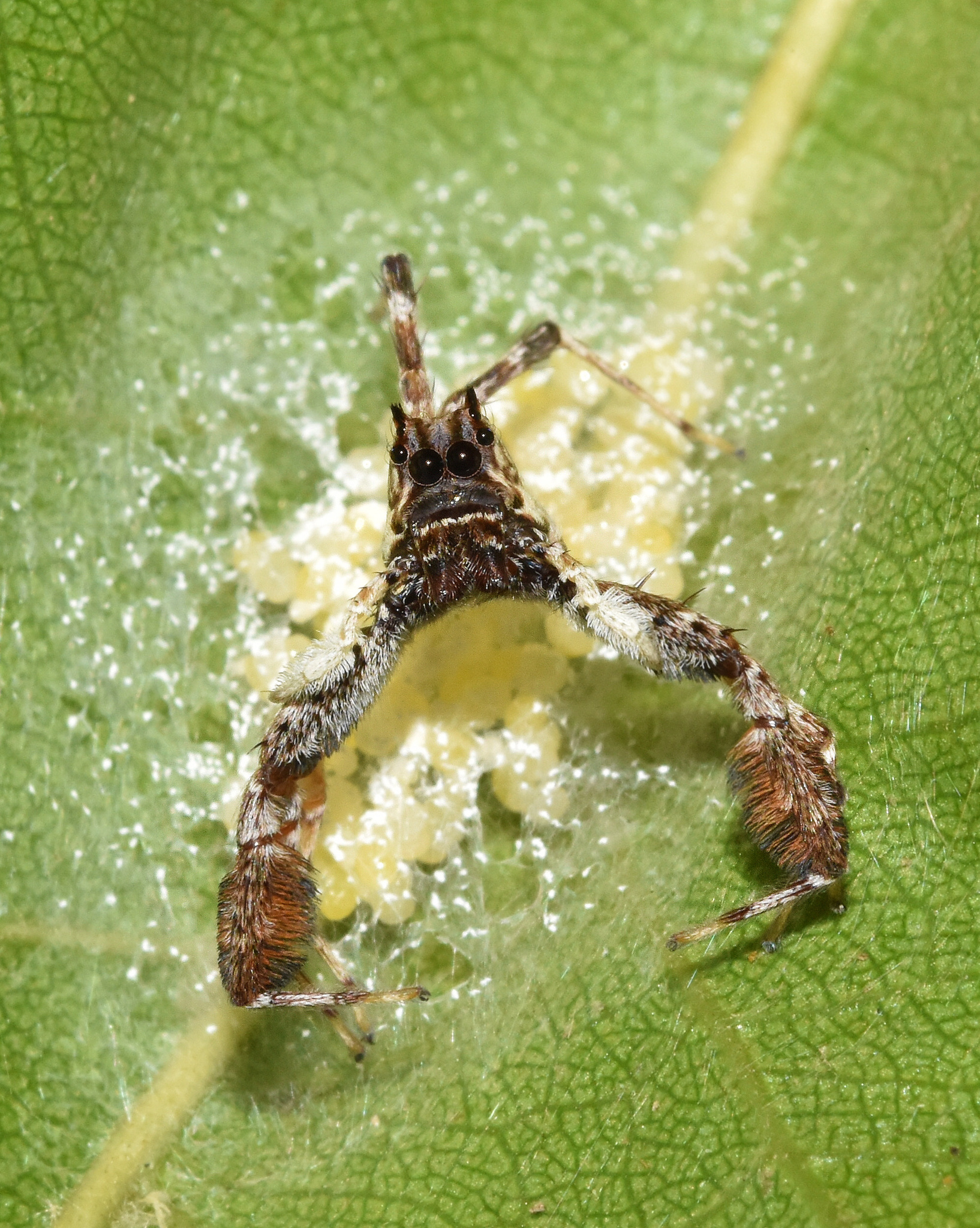
Female V. durbani guarding eggs

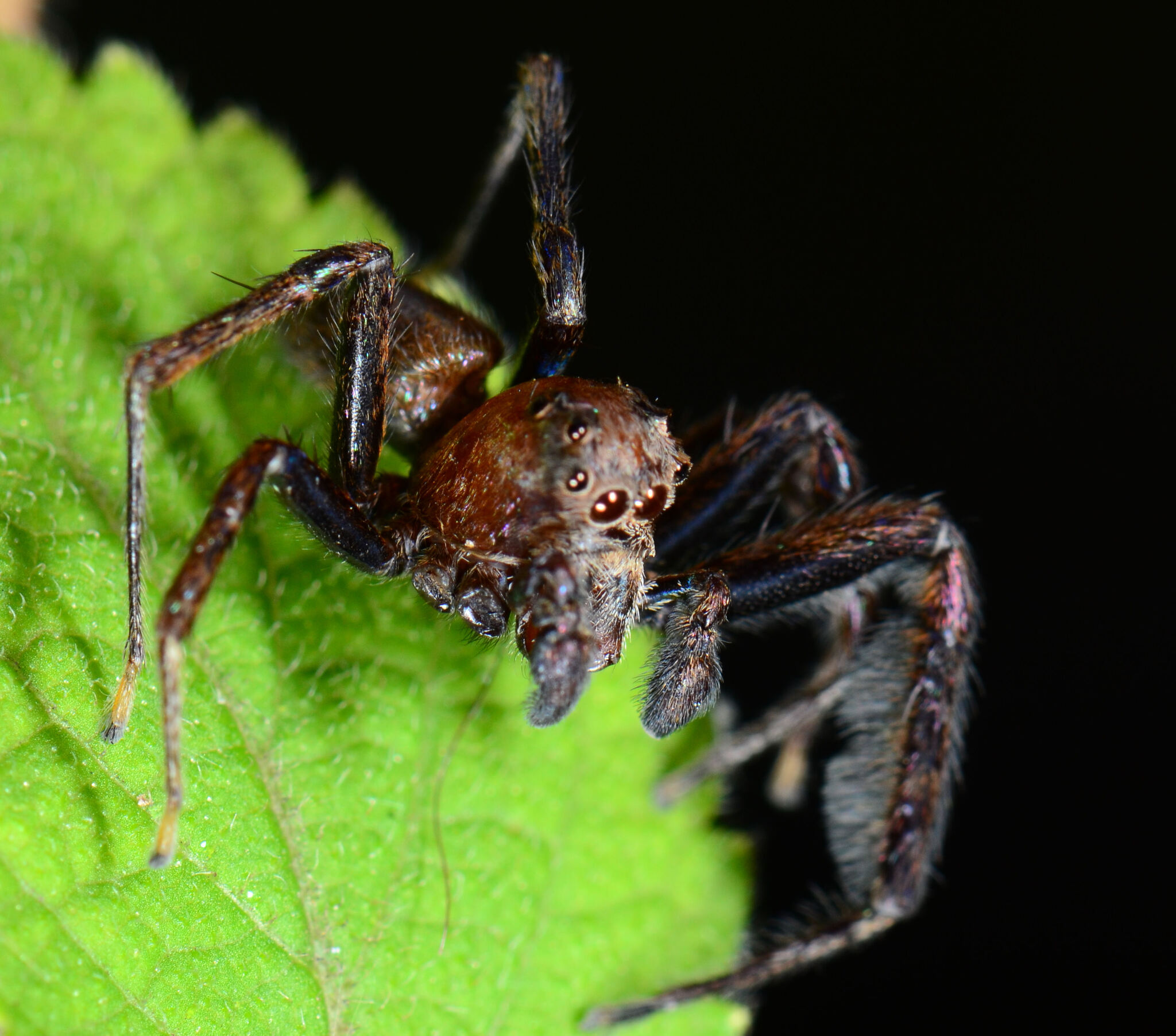
Male V. durbani

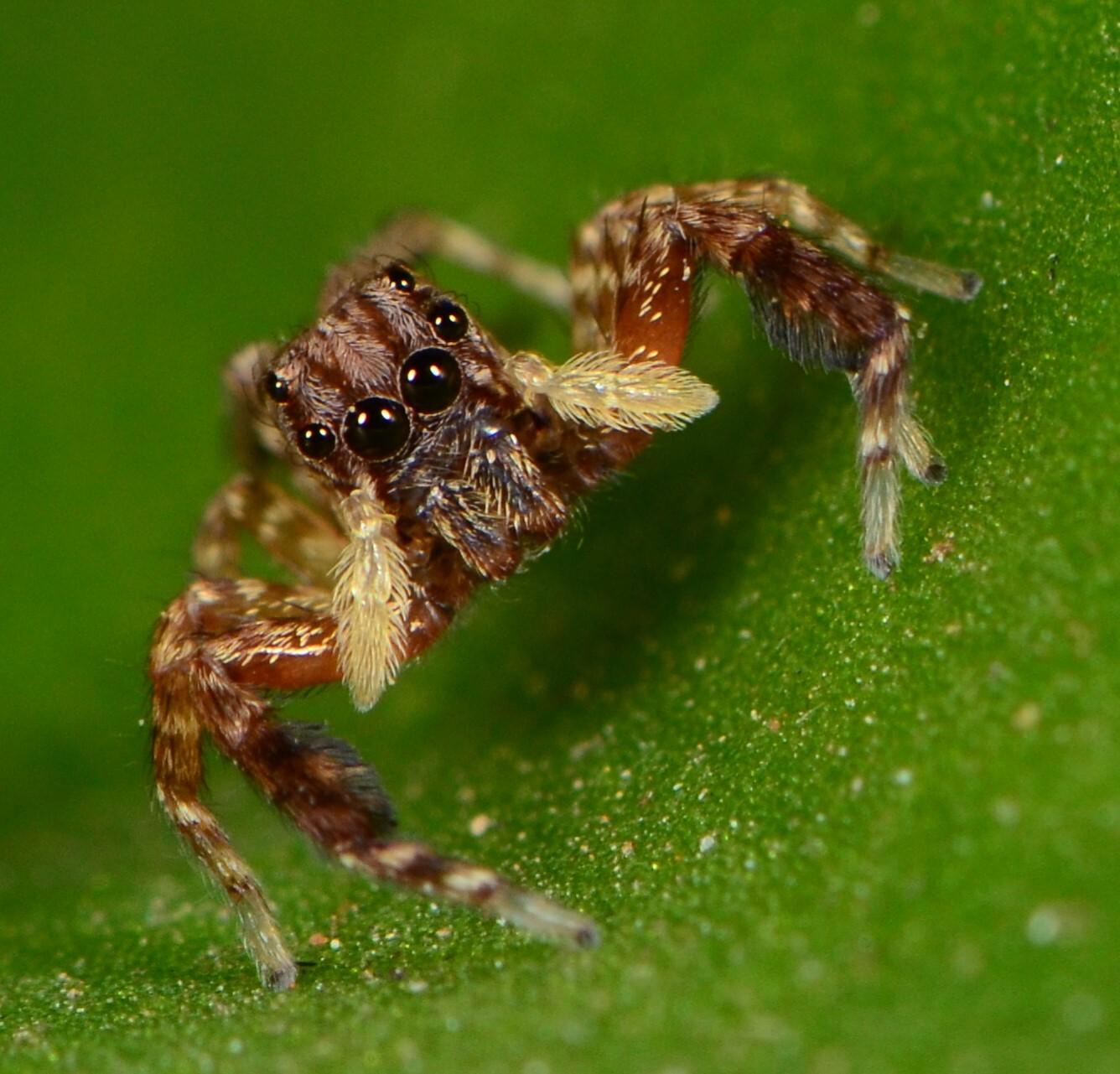
Juvenile female V. durbani

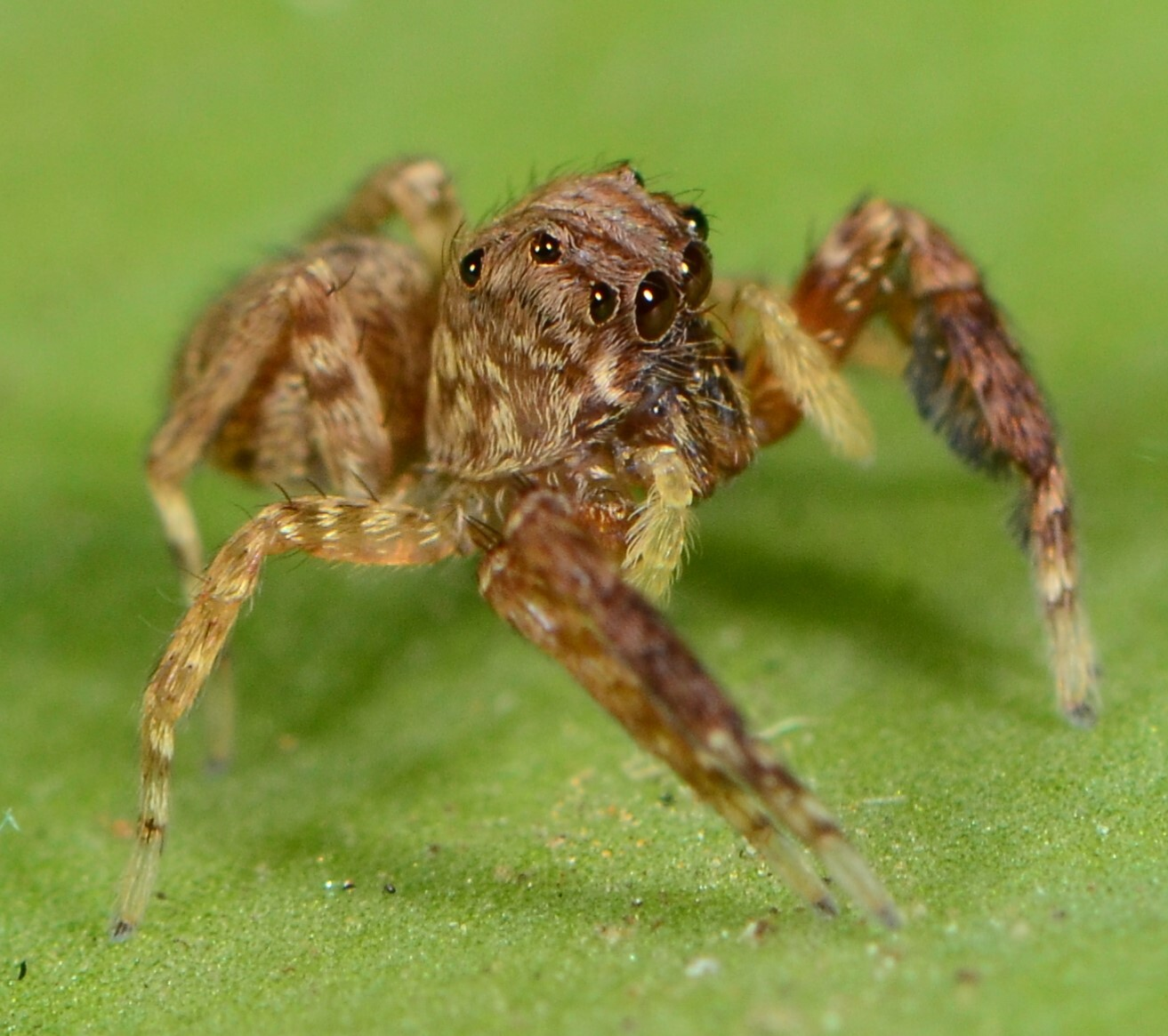
Juvenile female V. durbani

== Species ==
As of October 2025, this genus includes two species:

- Veissella durbani (G. W. Peckham & E. G. Peckham, 1903) – South Africa (type species)
- Veissella milloti Logunov & Azarkina, 2008 – Comoros, Mayotte
