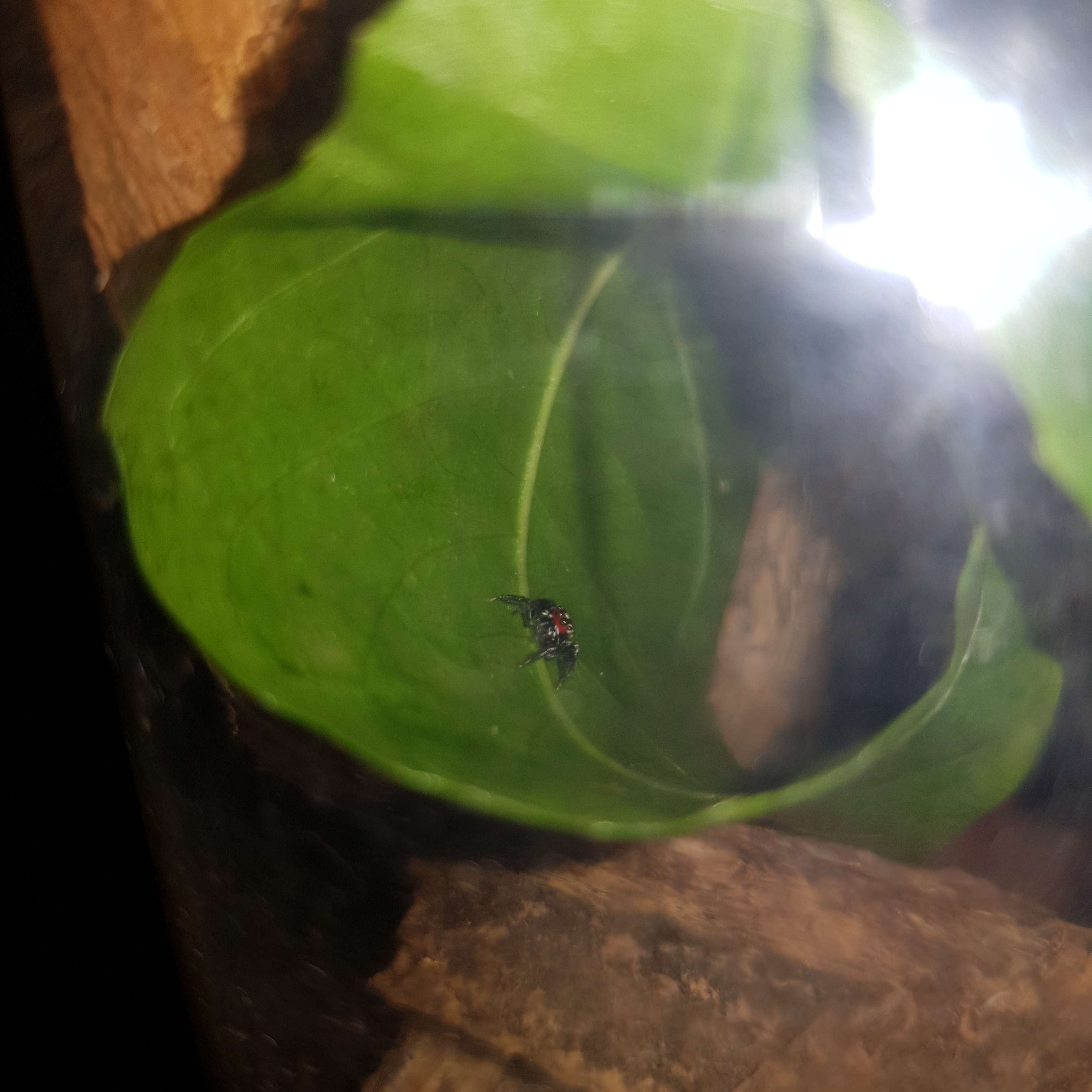

Scientific classification
- Kingdom: Animalia
- Phylum: Arthropoda
- Subphylum: Chelicerata
- Class: Arachnida
- Order: Araneae
- Infraorder: Araneomorphae
- Family: Salticidae
- Genus: Evarcha
- Species: E. culicivora

Binomial name
- Evarcha culicivora Wesolowska & Jackson, 2003
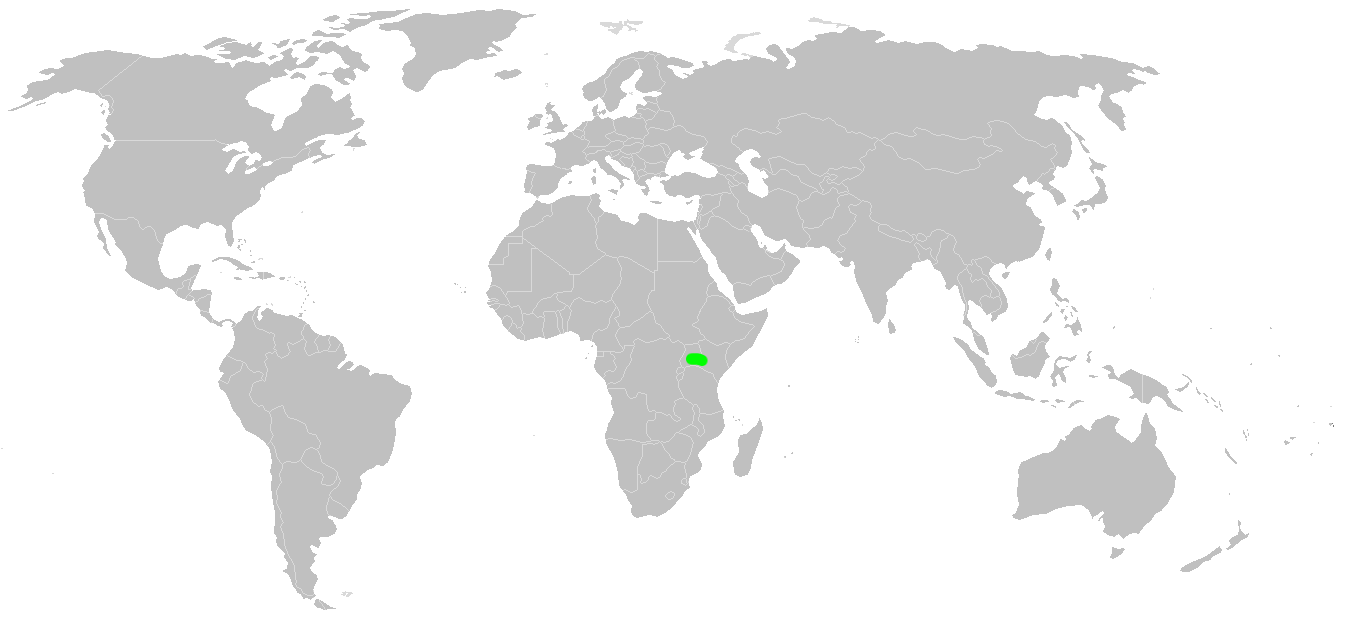

= Evarcha culicivora =

Species of spider

Evarcha culicivora is a species of jumping spider (family Salticidae) found only around Lake Victoria in Kenya and Uganda. At maturity, E. culicivora spiders have an average size of 5 mm for both males and females. The range in size for either sex is quite small, with females being only slightly larger on average (4–7 mm compared to 3–6 mm).

It is commonly known as the vampire spider because it indirectly desires the blood of vertebrates. It does this by predating on blood-sucking female mosquitoes in the genus Anopheles, the mosquito responsible for transmitting malaria in the region, as well as other vector-borne diseases in humans. Experimentally, these spiders are considered Anopheles specialists. Evarcha culicivora has an association with the introduced Lantana camara and the native Ricinus communis plants. They consume the nectar for food and preferentially use these plants as a location for courtship.

The mating interactions of E. culicivora are species-specific. Their mating interactions follow mutual mate choice in which both males and females have preferences for partners and perform displays. These preferences vary with gender and age. This behavioral characteristic differs from other jumping spiders, where the majority of males show preference and pursue females.

== Description ==
As juveniles, all E. culicivora are grey-brown in color, both on their bodies and face. Adult males have blood-red faces and white-hair patches above the principal eyes and at the side of the clypeus and on palp tibia. Juveniles and adult females have grey-brown faces, but adult females have a faint red tint. It is rare for adult females and juveniles to have white patches. Body lengths of males range from 3 mm to 6 mm, whereas females range from 4 mm to 7 mm.

== Taxonomy ==
Evarcha culicivora belongs to the jumping spider genus Evarcha, a relatively large genus comprising 89 nominal species. Evarcha is widespread, ranging from the Palaearctic, Africa and Southern Asia to the middle Pacific area, with a few species from America and Australia. Within the genus, species are polyphyletic as the species have very different morphology of genital organs. For example, the embolus ranges from short, strong and compact to long and filamentous.

== Habitat and distribution ==
Evarcha culicivora is found only around Lake Victoria in Kenya and Uganda. This area is full of a variety of insect life and has a large number of Chaoboridae midges. These lake flies are similar in size and appearance to Anopheles mosquitos, common prey of E. culicivora, but E. culicivora disregards their presence as well as the majority of all other insects present. This species builds nests, where it primarily resides. Nests are built within closed spaces such as tree trunks or walls of buildings and are often made of dead foliage such as leaves. It hides in the grass or other plants close to the ground when it is quiescent. When it is hunting, it will go to more exposed locations such as the walls inside some mosquito-infested houses.

== Home range and territoriality ==
=== Nest structure ===
Around E. culicivora common habitats, such as tree trunks or walls of buildings, individuals build nests on dead leafs inside their webs. Their webs are silk tubes. The length of an individual's web equates to four-times the resident spider's body length, while the width of the web is six-times the resident spider's body width. Typically, there are one or more elastic openings. The nests are built from dead, rolled-up leaves and some grass, which form an enclosed space in the spider webs. Nests located at the narrow end of the conical leaf typically contain only one door, opening at the wider end. For nests that have more space, there are two openings. It is rare to have three openings in a nest.

=== Interactions at the nest ===
In female-female and male-male interactions, the intruder encroaches when the resident is quiescent in the nest. The intruder usually probes first and then pushes its face into the silk, chewing and tugging the silk. The resident pulls on the silk as a response. For male-female interaction at the nest, see the mating section. Observations have been made of males cohabiting with females. In cases of cohabitation, the two silk tubes are woven together and the two doors of the two chambers are aligned together. See the Courtship section for more information on how cohabitation plays a role in courtship.

== Diet ==
=== Predatory feeding ===
Spiders do not normally feed directly on vertebrate blood. Evarcha culicivora feeds indirectly on vertebrate blood by preying on female mosquitoes that have had recent blood meals. It chooses blood-fed females over non-mosquito prey, male mosquitoes and sugar-fed female mosquitoes, which demonstrates their preference of blood. As of 2015, E. culicivora is one of only two spiders that have been experimentally studied and considered a mosquito specialist, the other being Paracyrba wanlessi. The term mosquito specialization refers to the adaptation and use of characteristics of the living being that explain its desire to target a specific type of prey. The specific desire for Anopheles mosquitoes was supported when presented with two blood-carrying mosquitoes of different genera: the Anopheles was consumed by both adults and juveniles. Juveniles would choose the Anopheles over all other prey regardless of whether it actually was carrying blood. When presented with a blood-carrying mosquito, regardless of species, E. culicivora would consume the blood-carrying one. Small juveniles choose smaller prey while adults choose larger prey. Evarcha culicivora may be adapted to choose prey that are easy to capture. However, their preference for blood takes precedence over their preference for size. The prey-choice behavior of E. culicivora is innate, and they can make highly specific prey identifications by sight or odor alone. This preference was not absolute, as starved or significantly more hungry spiders were less discriminating and would consume whatever prey they were presented.

==== Role of scent ====
Evarcha culicivora is the only known animal that targets its prey according to what it senses that the prey has eaten. The spider's sharp senses allow it to be one of the most picky predators in nature, and especially within this family of spiders. They are known to be attracted to the smell of bloody mosquitoes and also human feet, and they themselves sense their more luring smell after a large blood meal. Additionally, these spiders are able to detect and pounce on their prey correctly even without scents because of their strong ability to distinguish between visual cues through the receptor system in the eyes. The large front pair of eyes are highly reactive to stimuli and contain over a thousand receptors in adults and over three hundred receptors in young, making E. culicivora a choosy eater throughout their life cycle.

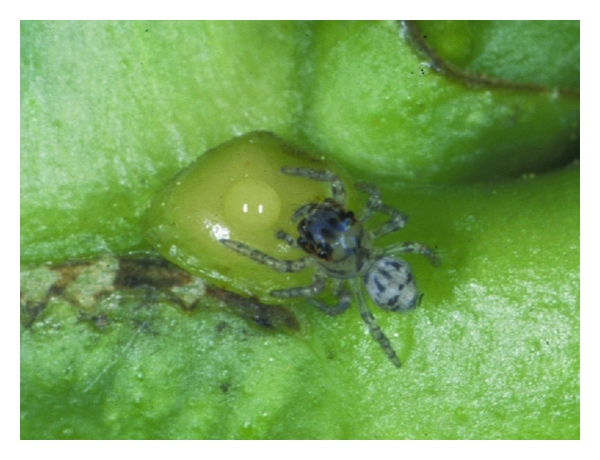
Evarcha culicivora juvenile approaching nectar on an extrafloral nectary of Ricinus communis

=== Non-predatory feeding ===
Hunting spiders including salticids supplement their predatory diet with nectar, and nectar meals are important alternative food resource when prey are not sufficient. This is because fructose is a significant component of their diet and the attainment of fructose comes primarily from the consumption of nectar. Younger spiders might benefit more from nectar consumption simply because the amount of nectar obtained from these plants may be sufficient for the smaller individuals but not for the larger spiders. Consequently, nectar consumption may be more suited as a meal substitute for juveniles than adults.

Lantana camara (family Verbenaceae) and Ricinus communis (family Euphorbiaceae) are two common plant species in the region where E. culicivora resides. Evarcha culicivora feeds on the nectar from these two plants by pressing its chelicerae into L. camara flowers, or into the extra-floral nectaries of R. communis. The odor of these two plants have been shown to be salient to E. culicivora. See the Plant relationship section for more information on the spider-plant relationship.

== Webs ==
Like other jumping spiders, E. culicivora are hunters who have little use for webs. They actively hunt their prey, and therefore do not build a web to capture prey. Instead, they make silk nests or shelters under leaves. Their nests are built for protection and mating. See the Home range and territoriality section for more information on their nests.

== Hunting behavior ==
=== Prey capture technique ===
Larger individuals of E. culicivora typically orient themselves towards the mosquito, regardless of the mosquito's posture. They then adopt the typical pre-capture behavior of salticids. They approach the prey slowly and directly with their bodies lowered, then they pause when close and jump onto the mosquito. However, not all E. culicivora are able to follow this tactic successfully. Smaller juvenile spiders have adopted an Anopheles-specific prey-capture behavior, using the posture of Anopheles mosquitoes as a primary cue to identify them. Anopheles has a distinctive resting posture with its abdomen angled up. In this case, the spider takes a detour and approaches from behind the mosquito and under its abdomen, and then attacks from below. Attacking from underneath minimizes the risk of juveniles being thrown off by the mosquito in flight as they can hold on to the mosquito from underneath. Regardless of the approach, both juvenile and adults had similar success rates of capturing and consuming Anopheles mosquitoes.

=== Adaptive timing ===
Evarcha culicivora has been observed to time its predation to the early morning hours since this is when Anopheles mosquitoes are resting after their nighttime feeding to digest the blood they obtained. In the morning when they are most responsive, they are more deliberate in prey choice and they distinguish between prey odors corresponding to living and visible prey and false lures from dead prey. These spiders are less inclined to pursue prey odors in the afternoon since their preferred mosquito prey are not as vulnerable during that time period. This variation in diet pattern does not appear to affect their mating success or make them more inclined to mate, most likely because they sense mate, plant, and human odors to be distinctive. Evarcha culicivora has this adaptive timing in order to facilitate efficient predation to obtain high-quality prey in a timely manner.

== Mating ==
=== Mate choice ===
In contrast to most jumping spiders, mating behavior in E. culicivora is very violent. Cannibalism of both sexes are more common than other spider species. The frequency with which males kill females is higher than that of females killing males. Therefore, to ensure reproductive success, E. culicivora has evolved a mate choice strategy. Larger males are more likely to engage in cannibalism towards females. Therefore, body size is a direct indicator of the degree of dangerousness and survival advantage. Evarcha culicivora must make some trade-offs between successful offspring and their safety after mating. Virginity is also an important variable in mate choice. Virgin males and females are willing to take risks by choosing the opposite sex individual with larger body size. However, previously mated individuals prefer safe partners with smaller body size.

=== Sexual cannibalism ===
Sexual cannibalism only occurs in a small proportion of E. culicivora spiders, but their sexual cannibalism behavior is different from most other spiders. In E. culicivora, males are more likely to be the predators and females respond to them as prey. Sexual cannibalism in E. culicivora mainly happens when two individuals have different body lengths and normally the bigger one is the predator. There are a few common scenarios of sexual cannibalism in E. culicivora: 1) The predator stalks the prey and attacks the prey before the prey is aware. There is no further interaction before the encounter. 2) The male predator displays at the quiescent female at a distance and when he gets close, he suddenly shifts to a predatorial stance, thereby attacking the female. 3) The male predator mounts and initiates postmount courtship with the female. He then kills the quiescent female. 4) The male predator suddenly kills the female during copulation. After biting or killing, the male predator may eat the female, walk away without eating her, continue copulating and then eat her, or continue copulating without eating her.

=== Male-female interaction and copulation ===
It is common in salticids that males initiate male-female interactions by displaying first. In E. culicivora specifically, the initiation of male-female interactions vary by sex, as it is not always the male pursuing the female. This is unique within the Salticidae. Both male and female spiders actively participate when looking for a partner. Both sexes make vision-based determinations when considering if they want to choose a mate. Most commonly, in E. culicivora, males initiate if the female is inside the nest; but if the female is outside the nest, either sex could initiate display. For initial displaying behavior, males begin with erect posturing and females begin with hunched posturing. It is rare for males to start with dancing directly during initial male-female interaction.

Dancing and spurting behavior only happens in males. Zigzag dancing, for example, is very complex and variable. The male lowers or raises his body and steps to the side, pauses, then raises or lowers his body and steps to the side again. This successive zigzag dancing brings a male closer to the female. Males usually direct posturing and dancing to the female's nest, instead of the female. A male usually begins probing at the door immediately after he arrives at the female's nest. Females would hold the door down when the male probes. As the male enters the nest, he taps and probes with his palps. Once his body is partly in the nest, he advances towards the female. The copulatory posture is typical of most salticids. The male's dorsal surface is facing the female and they face opposite directions.

=== Courtship ===
Evarcha culicivora follows two courtship patterns. The choice of courtship depends on both location and female maturity. The first general courtship pattern is the spider's use of visual cues and displays to attract one another when they are outside the nest. The second courtship pattern occurs when they are present at a nest and the males make use of silk-borne signals. During the second type of courtship, cohabiting of the males with subadult females involves the males hanging around and within females' nest, only after the same initial male-female interactions. These can last anywhere from 1–10 days and end successfully when the female has molted and they copulate. Throughout their reproductive life, E. culicivora has been demonstrated to retain a variety of highly variable display behaviors that are used differently depending on courtship.

== Plant relationship ==
When E. culicivora is within its normal habitat, this spider has been shown to associate frequently with the native plants Lantana camara and Ricinus communis. They are attracted to these plants by their odor. This unusual association is not just because the spiders eat their nectar (see the diet section), but also because they play a role in the location for courtship for these spiders. Both sexes of E. culicivora make exaggerated movements when they are on these plants during display, thus presenting with more movements and more variations. The duration of the interaction is also longer. Evarcha culicivora has high specificity in its preference to these plant species, and the odor of these two plants might prime the males and females to meet potential mates. The relationship between E. culicivora and these plants are still largely unknown.

== Physiology ==
=== Vision ===
The jumping spiders (family Salticidae) are vision-proficient and have outstanding spatial acuity due to their complex eyes. Salticids use color as cues to make decisions such as classifying prey, identifying landmarks, etc. Color vision of green and ultraviolet are universal among salticids but different species have different mechanisms of achieving certain color vision, and have a different extent to which color vision is inclusive of red. Adult males of E. culicivora have bright-red faces. It has been found that the red faces, as visual stimuli, influence adult males' decisions in their behaviors during encounters with other males. The red face is not essential for E. culicivora to be able to identify the individual is a rival conspecific male, but rather, is important for them to decide what to do. When they see a red face, they initiate displaying from further away, and escalate to higher levels of aggression. However, it is unclear if they are sensitive to specifically the brightness, chroma or hue or other factors.

Salticidae use their eight eyes for the majority of basic tasks including, hunting, mating, escaping, etc. Their eyes are divided into two sets. One set is considered the side eyes and the other being principal eyes. There are only two principal eyes, which primarily control their vision. The retinas of the principal eyes have four layers of receptors. This layering can be for the examination of the maximum sharpness of objects (i.e. prey). Jumping spiders also have some form of color vision, with each layer responsible for a different color sensitivity/recognition. In general, jumping spiders are able to see with a high level of spatial resolution that is incomparable to any other species similar to it in size. This explains why jumping spiders are predators and hunt.

Evarcha culicivora uses a local processing system for object recognition when recognizing and capturing prey. The spider distinguishes its potential prey based on angles and abstract concepts rather than a more holistic detection approach like posture.

=== Locomotion ===
During normal locomotion, E. culicivora walks in a similar pattern to most salticids. They step for 0.5 seconds and pause for 0.5 seconds in a rapid stop-and-go fashion. When they are provoked, they quickly move away and make repeated leaps combined with running. Compared to other salticids, E. culicivora is less easily provoked and tends to be calmer.

== Bites to humans and animals ==
Although E. culicivora is found near buildings occupied by people, there is no evidence of anyone ever being bitten by E. culicivora or of any attempt to bite a human. The species' mouthparts are not specialized for piercing vertebrate skin and ingesting blood like mosquito mouthparts, even though they feed on vertebrate blood indirectly by taking blood from mosquitoes.

== Interaction with humans and livestock ==
=== Human benefits and ecosystem effects ===
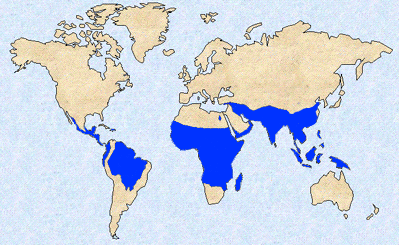
Malaria geographic distribution

Malaria is the world's most important insect-borne threat to public health, causing more than one million deaths per year. All vectors of human malaria are female mosquitoes from the genus Anopheles. In the region where E. culicivora resides, malaria is especially severe. Spiders, especially ones like E. culicivora, that primarily hunt a specific prey can have a significant effect on the population and population dynamics of insects within the habitats they reside. For this reason, researchers have been considering using spiders like E. culicivora for the biocontrol of certain pests. Evarcha culicivora could be a vital way for controlling the spread of deadly viral diseases commonly spread by the Anopheles mosquitoes, although little testing has been done.

=== Detection of human odor ===
Human odor, especially worn socks, is salient to malaria vectors and also to adults and juveniles of E. culicivora. Their detection of human odor may be less important for finding people but more important for finding the mosquitoes that carry blood of people.
