= Phaeacius wanlessi =

Scientific classification
- Kingdom: Animalia
- Phylum: Arthropoda
- Subphylum: Chelicerata
- Class: Arachnida
- Order: Araneae
- Infraorder: Araneomorphae
- Family: Salticidae
- Genus: Phaeacius
- Species: P. wanlessi

Binomial name
- Phaeacius wanlessi Wijesinghe, 1991

Species of spider

Phaeacius wanlessi is a species of spider of the genus Phaeacius. It is native to Nepal and Sri Lanka.
