= Wanlessia =

Scientific classification
- Kingdom: Animalia
- Phylum: Arthropoda
- Subphylum: Chelicerata
- Class: Arachnida
- Order: Araneae
- Infraorder: Araneomorphae
- Family: Salticidae
- Subfamily: Spartaeinae
- Genus: Wanlessia; Wijesinghe, 1992

Type species
- W. sedgwicki Wijesinghe, 1992

Species
- W. denticulata Peng, Tso & Li, 2002 – Taiwan; W. sedgwicki Wijesinghe, 1992 – Borneo (Sarawak)

Genus of spiders

Wanlessia is a genus of Asian jumping spiders that was first described by D. P. Wijesinghe in 1992. As of September 2019 it contains two species, both endemic to eastern Asia: W. denticulata and W. sedgwicki. It is related to Portia, and is the only member of the subfamily Spartaeinae with well-developed palpal conductors. Both species only have descriptions for males. It is named in honor of arachnologist Fred R. Wanless, who described more than a dozen salticid genera from 1970 to 1990.

Wanlessia sedgwicki males are about 4 millimetres (0.16 in) long. Both the carapace and legs are yellowish-brown, though the carapace has irregular black markings and a lighter area around the fovea. The opisthosoma is yellow to white with similar markings near the rear, and is covered with amber-grey hairs. The legs have black rings on some segments.
