= Cocalodes =

Scientific classification
- Kingdom: Animalia
- Phylum: Arthropoda
- Subphylum: Chelicerata
- Class: Arachnida
- Order: Araneae
- Infraorder: Araneomorphae
- Family: Salticidae
- Subfamily: Spartaeinae
- Genus: Cocalodes; Pocock, 1897

Type species
- C. leptopus Pocock, 1897

Species
- 12, see text

Genus of spiders

Cocalodes is a genus of jumping spiders that was first described by Reginald Innes Pocock in 1897. The name is an alteration of the salticid genus Cocalus.

== Species ==
As of June 2019 it contains twelve species, found only in Indonesia and Papua New Guinea:

- Cocalodes cygnatus Wanless, 1982 – Indonesia
- Cocalodes expers Wanless, 1982 – New Guinea
- Cocalodes innotabilis Wanless, 1982 – New Guinea
- Cocalodes leptopus Pocock, 1897 (type) – Indonesia
- Cocalodes longicornis Wanless, 1982 – New Guinea
- Cocalodes longipes (Thorell, 1881) – Indonesia, New Guinea
- Cocalodes macellus (Thorell, 1878) – Indonesia, New Guinea
- Cocalodes papuanus Simon, 1900 – New Guinea
- Cocalodes platnicki Wanless, 1982 – New Guinea
- Cocalodes protervus (Thorell, 1881) – New Guinea
- Cocalodes thoracicus Szombathy, 1915 – New Guinea
- Cocalodes turgidus Wanless, 1982 – New Guinea
