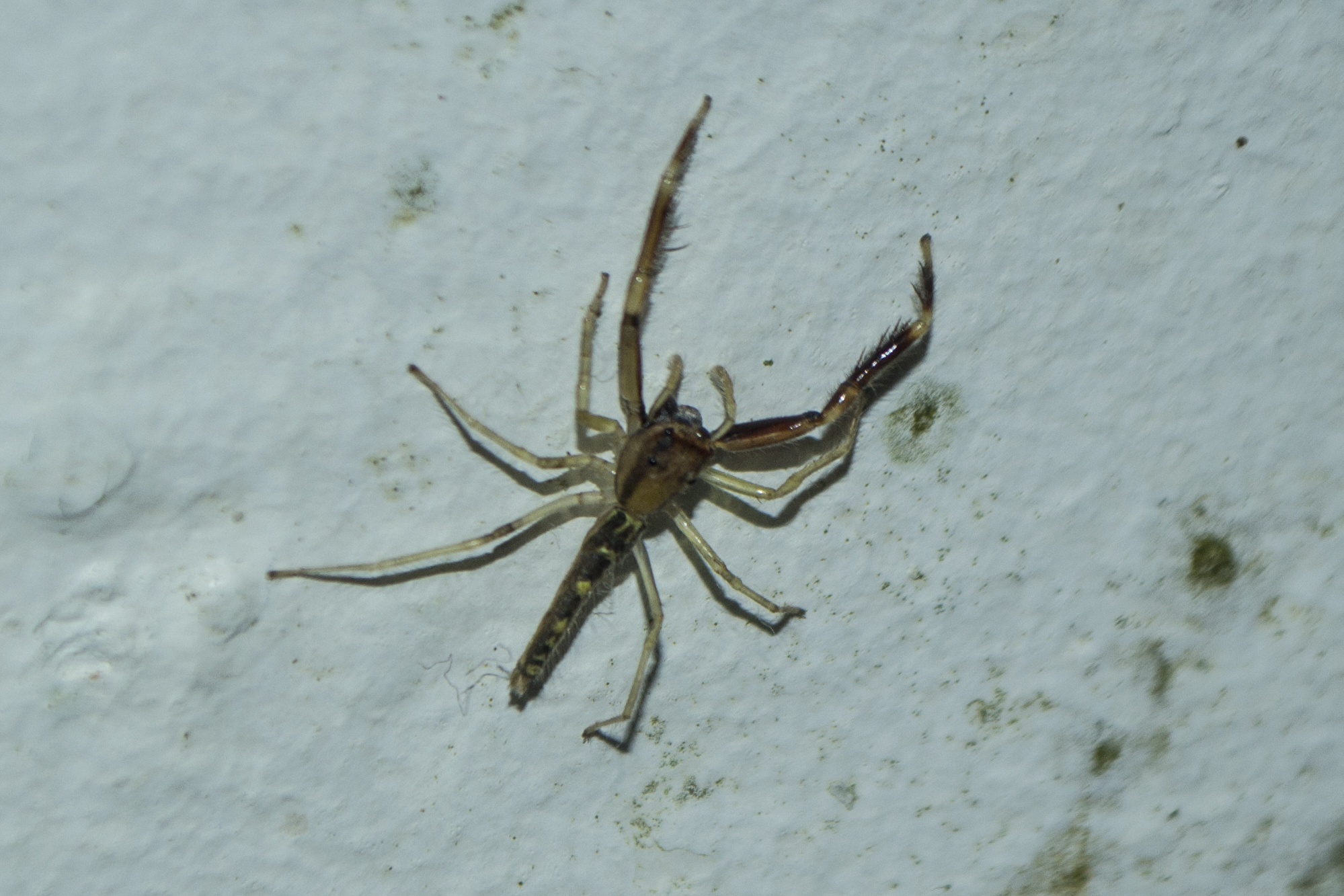
- Itata completa

Scientific classification
- Kingdom: Animalia
- Phylum: Arthropoda
- Subphylum: Chelicerata
- Class: Arachnida
- Order: Araneae
- Infraorder: Araneomorphae
- Family: Salticidae
- Subfamily: Salticinae
- Genus: Itata; Peckham & Peckham, 1894

Type species
- Itata vadia Peckham & Peckham, 1894

Species
- See text.

= Itata =

Genus of spiders

Itata is a genus of spiders in the jumping spider family, Salticidae.

== Name ==
The genus name is derived from the Itata River in southern Chile.

== Species ==
- Itata completa (Banks, 1929) – Panama
- Itata isabellina (Taczanowski, 1878) – Peru
- Itata partita Mello-Leitão, 1930 – Brazil
- Itata tipuloides Simon, 1901 – Peru, Bolivia, Brazil
- Itata vadia Peckham & Peckham, 1894 – Colombia
