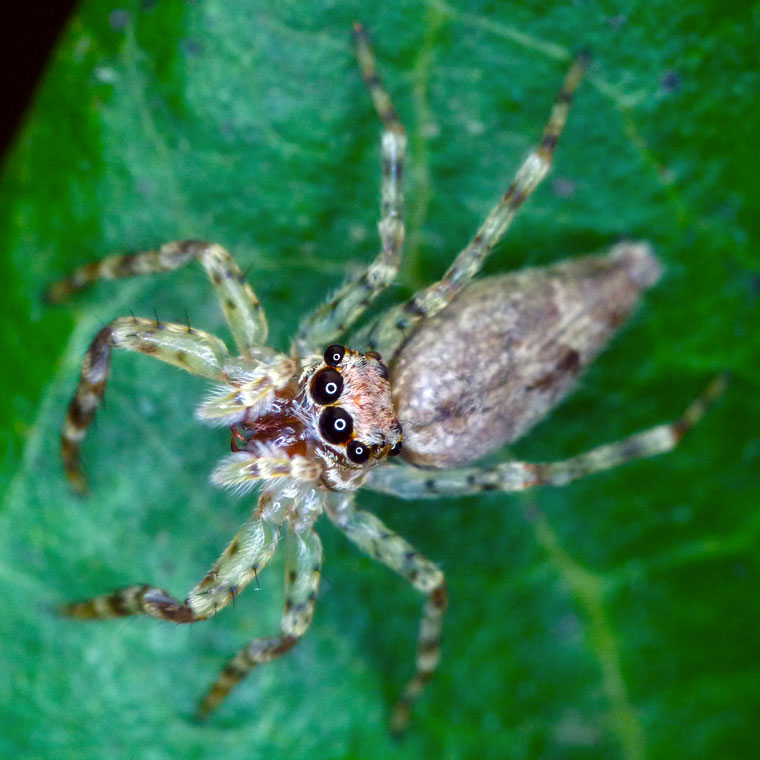
- Helpis minitabunda (female)

Scientific classification
- Kingdom: Animalia
- Phylum: Arthropoda
- Subphylum: Chelicerata
- Class: Arachnida
- Order: Araneae
- Infraorder: Araneomorphae
- Family: Salticidae
- Subfamily: Salticinae
- Genus: Helpis; Simon, 1901

Type species
- Astia minitabunda L. Koch, 1880

Species
- See text.

= Helpis =

Genus of spiders

Helpis is a genus of the spider family Salticidae (jumping spiders).

== Species ==
As of May 2017, the World Spider Catalog lists the following species in the genus:

- Helpis colemani (Wanless, 1988) – Queensland
- Helpis foelixi Żabka & Patoleta, 2014 – Queensland
- Helpis gracilis Gardzinska, 1996 – New South Wales
- Helpis kenilworthi Zabka, 2002 – Queensland, New South Wales
- Helpis longichelis Strand, 1915 – New Guinea
- Helpis longipalpis Gardzinska & Zabka, 2010 – Western Australia
- Helpis merriwa Żabka & Patoleta, 2014 – New South Wales
- Helpis minitabunda (L. Koch, 1880) – New Guinea, Eastern Australia, introduced to New Zealand
- Helpis occidentalis Simon, 1909 – Australia
- Helpis risdonica Zabka, 2002 – Tasmania
- Helpis staregai Żabka & Patoleta, 2014 – New South Wales
- Helpis tasmanica Zabka, 2002 – Tasmania
- Helpis wanlessi Żabka & Patoleta, 2014 – New South Wales
- Helpis wisharti Żabka & Patoleta, 2014 – New South Wales
