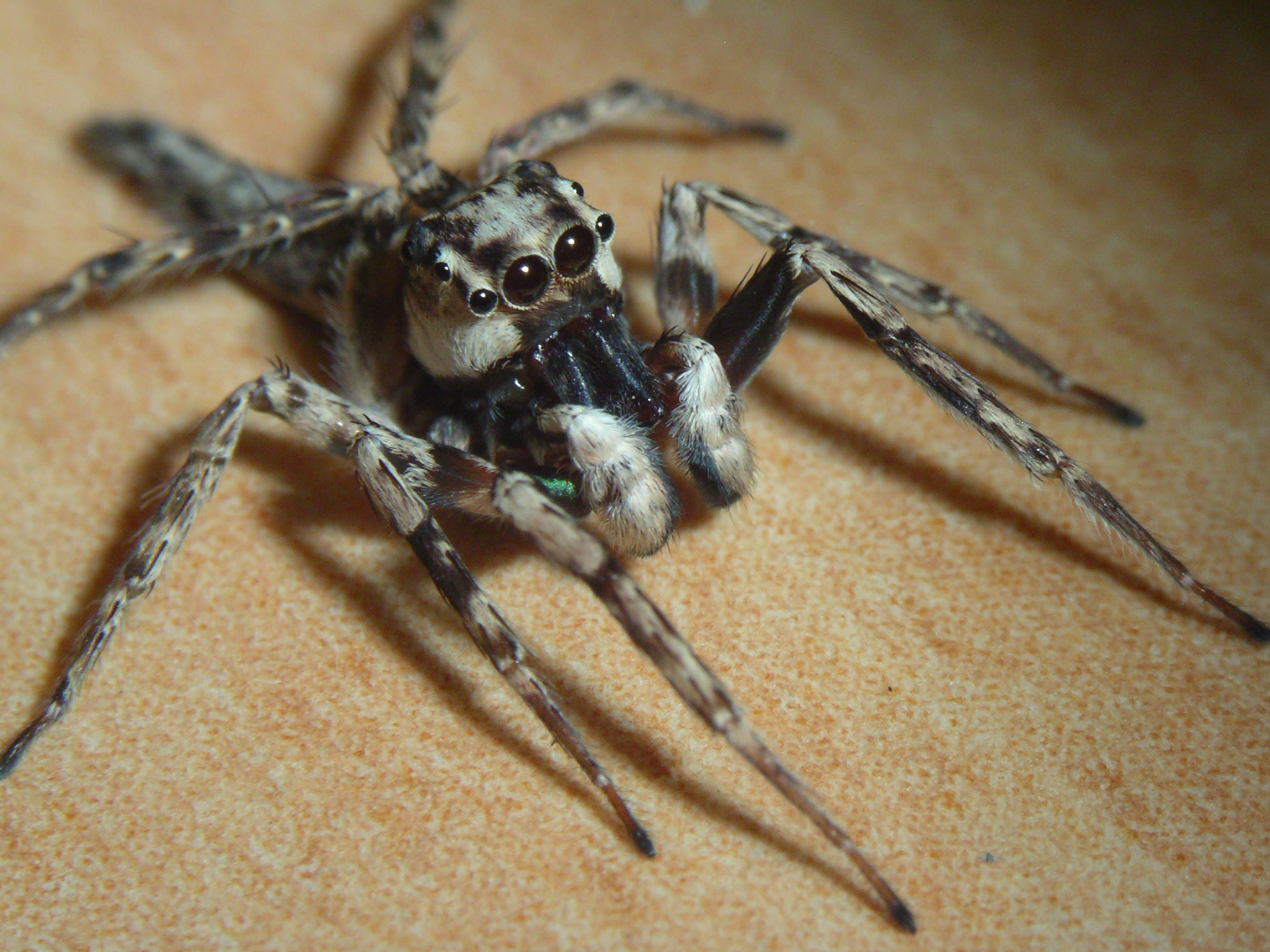
- Adult male Cocalus

Scientific classification
- Kingdom: Animalia
- Phylum: Arthropoda
- Subphylum: Chelicerata
- Class: Arachnida
- Order: Araneae
- Infraorder: Araneomorphae
- Family: Salticidae
- Subfamily: Spartaeinae
- Genus: Cocalus; C. L. Koch, 1846

Type species
- C. concolor C. L. Koch, 1846

Species
- 6, see text

= Cocalus (spider) =

Genus of spiders

Cocalus is a genus of jumping spiders that was first described by Carl Ludwig Koch in 1846, and is named after Cocalus, a Sicilian king of Greek mythology.

At least one species, Cocalus gibbosus, does not adhere to spider silk and will sometimes invade the webs of other spiders and stalk across the webs to feed on them, preferring spiders over insects in its diet. However, unlike other araneophagic jumping spiders like Portia, Cocalus gibbosus does not pluck on the webs of other spiders.

== Species ==
As of June 2019 it contains six species, found only in Asia, Australia, and Papua New Guinea:

- Cocalus concolor C. L. Koch, 1846 (type) – Indonesia, New Guinea
- Cocalus gibbosus Wanless, 1981 – Australia (Queensland)
- Cocalus lacinia Sudhin, Nafin, Sumesh & Sudhikumar, 2019 – India
- Cocalus limbatus Thorell, 1878 – Indonesia
- Cocalus menglaensis Cao & Li, 2016 – China
- Cocalus murinus Simon, 1899 – India, Indonesia, Singapore (Sumatra)
