= Rishaschia =

Scientific classification
- Kingdom: Animalia
- Phylum: Arthropoda
- Subphylum: Chelicerata
- Class: Arachnida
- Order: Araneae
- Infraorder: Araneomorphae
- Family: Salticidae
- Genus: Rishaschia; Makhan, 2006
- Species: R. mandibularis

Binomial name
- Rishaschia mandibularis (Taczanowski, 1871)

Genus of spiders

Rishaschia is a monotypic genus of South American jumping spiders containing the single species, Rishaschia mandibularis. It was first described by D. Makhan in 2006, and is found in Suriname, Ecuador, Guyana, Brazil, and French Guiana.
