= Paracyrba =

Scientific classification
- Kingdom: Animalia
- Phylum: Arthropoda
- Subphylum: Chelicerata
- Class: Arachnida
- Order: Araneae
- Infraorder: Araneomorphae
- Family: Salticidae
- Subfamily: Spartaeinae
- Genus: Paracyrba; Żabka & Kovac, 1996
- Species: P. wanlessi

Binomial name
- Paracyrba wanlessi Zabka & Kovac, 1996

Genus of spiders

Paracyrba is a genus of jumping spiders found only in Malaysia. It contains only one species, Paracyrba wanlessi. Its microhabitat are the water-filled hollow internodes of decaying bamboo, where it preys on aquatic animals, especially mosquito larvae. Paracyrba wanlessi and Evarcha culicivora, another jumping spider, are the only two spiders that have been experimentally studied and considered mosquito specialists, though the former preys on both adult and juvenile mosquitoes while the latter preys only on adult mosquitoes. In general only one specimen is found per occupied bamboo internode.

== Description ==
Females are up to 9 mm long, males 7 to 8. The spiders is generally dark colored. On the flattened carapace, there is a central whitish band, which is much larger in the female. On the opisthosoma there are four to five transverse, yellowish bands, and a light area near the spinnerets. The long, thin legs are suited for their stealthy, non-jumping movements. The genitals are very similar to those of Cyrba, and P. wanlessi seems to have separated from it mainly due to its lifestyle.

== Name ==
The genus name is a combination of the Ancient Greek para "near to" and the name of the related genus Cyrba. The species is named in honor of Fred R. Wanless, who contributed much to the knowledge about the subfamily Spartaeinae.

== Footnotes ==
- Salticidae.org: Diagnostic drawings and photographs
