= Neobrettus =

Scientific classification
- Kingdom: Animalia
- Phylum: Arthropoda
- Subphylum: Chelicerata
- Class: Arachnida
- Order: Araneae
- Infraorder: Araneomorphae
- Family: Salticidae
- Subfamily: Spartaeinae
- Genus: Neobrettus; Wanless, 1984

Type species
- N. tibialis (Prószyński, 1978)

Species
- 6, see text

Genus of spiders

Neobrettus is a genus of Asian jumping spiders that was first described by F. R. Wanless in 1984. The name is a combination of the prefix "neo-" and the salticid genus Brettus.

== Species ==
As of July 2019 it contains six species, found only in Asia:

- Neobrettus cornutus Deeleman-Reinhold & Floren, 2003 – Borneo
- Neobrettus heongi Barrion & Barrion-Dupo, 2013 – China
- Neobrettus nangalisagus Barrion, 2001 – Philippines
- Neobrettus phui Zabka, 1985 – Vietnam
- Neobrettus tibialis (Prószyński, 1978) (type) – Bhutan to Malaysia, Borneo
- Neobrettus xanthophyllum Deeleman-Reinhold & Floren, 2003 – Borneo
