= Galianora =

Scientific classification
- Kingdom: Animalia
- Phylum: Arthropoda
- Subphylum: Chelicerata
- Class: Arachnida
- Order: Araneae
- Infraorder: Araneomorphae
- Family: Salticidae
- Subfamily: Spartaeinae
- Genus: Galianora; Maddison, 2006

Type species
- G. sacha Maddison, 2006

Species
- G. bryicola Maddison, 2006 – Ecuador; G. sacha Maddison, 2006 – Ecuador

Genus of spiders

Galianora is a genus of Ecuadorian jumping spiders that was first described by Wayne Paul Maddison in 2006. As of June 2019 it contains only two species, found only in Ecuador: G. bryicola and G. sacha.

The two described species have quite a different body form: G. sacha is elongate and pale, with raptorial front legs, while G. bryicola is compact and brown. An as-yet undescribed species from Venezuela is intermediate in body form and palp. It is named in honor of arachnologist María Elena Galiano.
