= Sonoita lightfooti =

Scientific classification
- Kingdom: Animalia
- Phylum: Arthropoda
- Subphylum: Chelicerata
- Class: Arachnida
- Order: Araneae
- Infraorder: Araneomorphae
- Family: Salticidae
- Genus: Sonoita
- Species: S. lightfooti

Binomial name
- Sonoita lightfooti Peckham & Peckham, 1903

Species of spider

Sonoita lightfooti is a species of jumping spider. It was first described by George and Elizabeth Peckham in 1903, and is found only in Africa.

== Distribution ==
Sonoita lightfooti has been found in Ivory Coast, Ethiopia, Zimbabwe, Mozambique, South Africa, with a possible finding from India.
