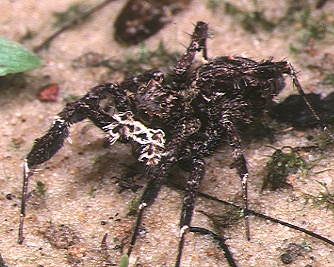
- female Portia fimbriata

Scientific classification
- Kingdom: Animalia
- Phylum: Arthropoda
- Subphylum: Chelicerata
- Class: Arachnida
- Order: Araneae
- Infraorder: Araneomorphae
- Family: Salticidae
- Subfamily: Spartaeinae; Wanless, 1984

Genera
- See text.

= Spartaeinae =

Subfamily of spiders

The Spartaeinae are a subfamily of the spider family Salticidae (jumping spiders). The subfamily was established by Fred R. Wanless in 1984 to include the groups Boetheae, Cocaleae, Lineae, Codeteae and Cyrbeae, which in turn were defined by Eugène Simon.

The Spartaeinae are palaeotropical, with an exceptional diversity in the Malaysian and Indonesian archipelagos.

They are unusual salticids that are considered basal to the phylogenetic tree of jumping spiders. Like the Lyssomaninae they lack many derived features that the Salticinae possess. Spartaeinae usually have large posterior median eyes. However, these are reduced in the genera Cyrba, Gelotia and Wanlessia.

== Genera ==
In 2015, Spartaeinae was divided into three tribes with 29 genera. One has been added since.

=== Tribe Cocalodini ===
- Allococalodes Wanless, 1982
- Cocalodes Pocock, 1897
- Cucudeta Maddison, 2009
- Depreissia Lessert, 1942
- Tabuina Maddison, 2009
- Yamangalea Maddison, 2009

=== Tribe Lapsiini ===
- Amilaps Maddison, 2019
- Galianora Maddison, 2006
- Lapsamita Ruiz, 2013
- Lapsias Simon, 1900
- Soesiladeepakius Makhan, 2007
- Thrandina Maddison, 2006

=== Tribe Spartaeini ===
- Brettus Thorell, 1895
- Cocalus C. L. Koch, 1846
- Cyrba Simon, 1876
- Gelotia Thorell, 1890
- Holcolaetis Simon, 1886
- Meleon Wanless, 1984
- Mintonia Wanless, 1984
- Neobrettus Wanless, 1984
- Paracyrba Żabka & Kovac, 1996
- Phaeacius Simon, 1900
- Portia Karsch, 1878
- Sonoita Peckham & Peckham, 1903
- Sparbambus Zhang, Woon & Li, 2006
- Spartaeus Thorell, 1891
- Taraxella Wanless, 1984
- Veissella Wanless, 1984
- Wanlessia Wijesinghe, 1992
- Yaginumanis Wanless, 1984
