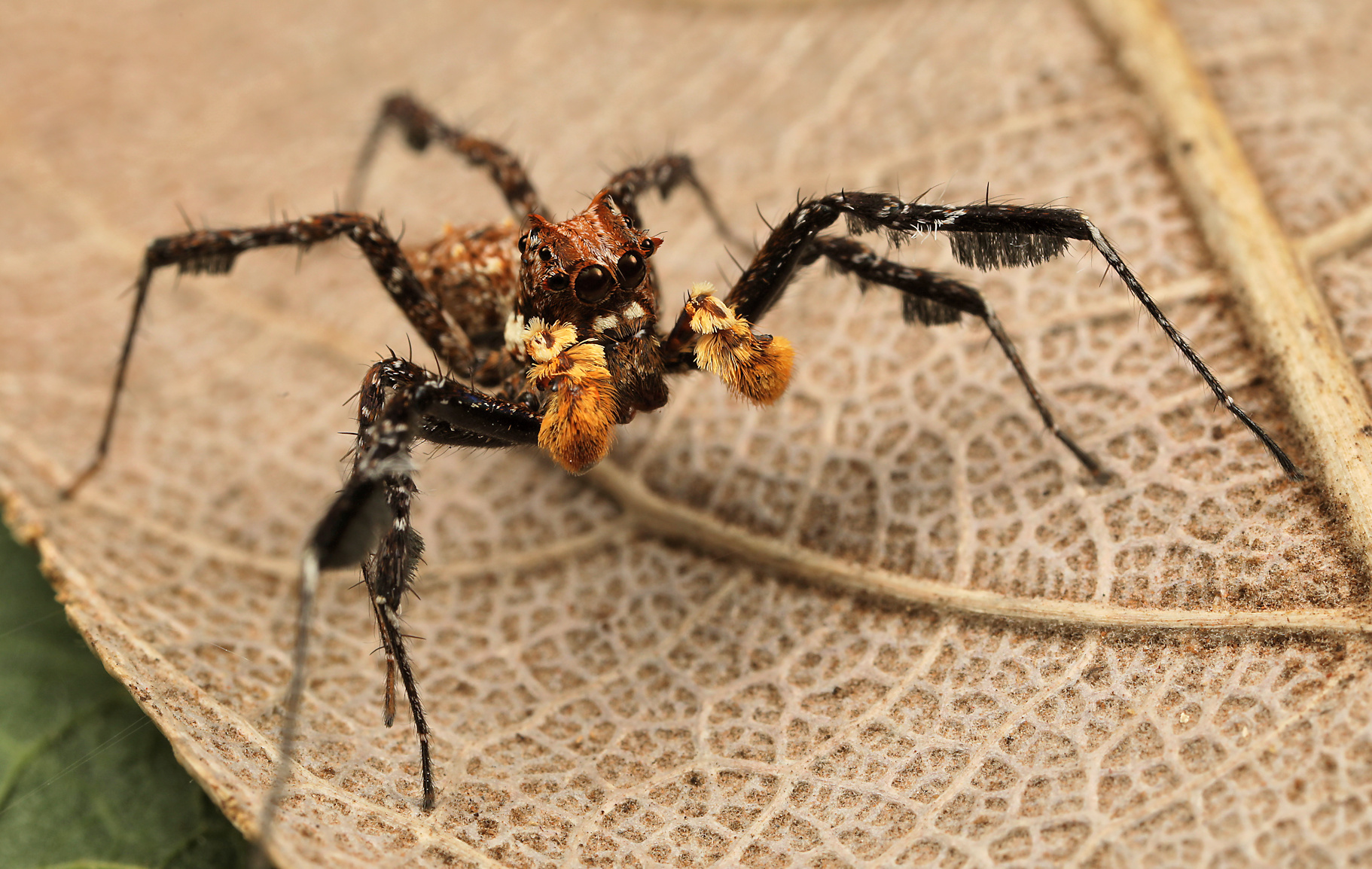
- male
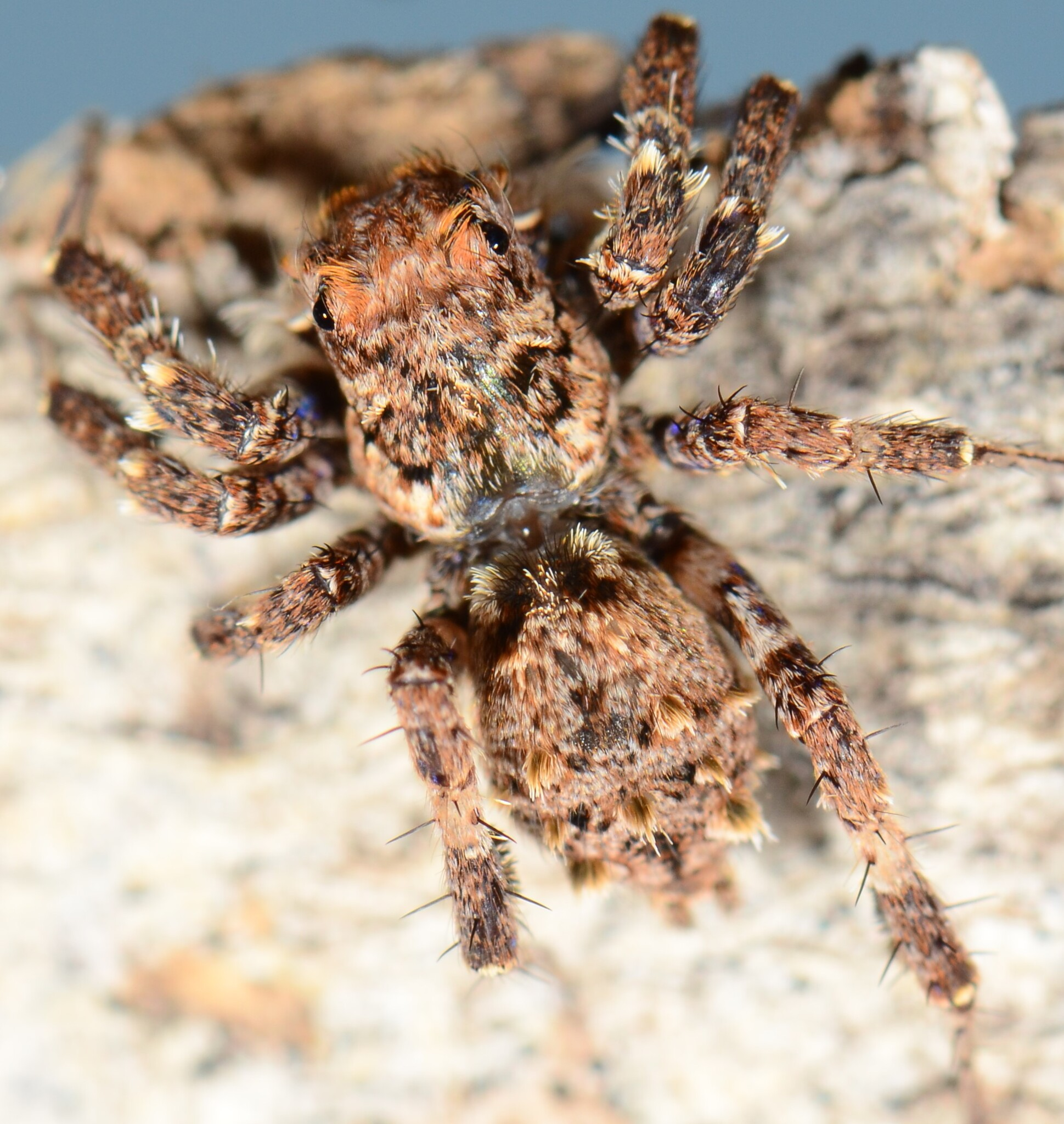
- female

Scientific classification
- Kingdom: Animalia
- Phylum: Arthropoda
- Subphylum: Chelicerata
- Class: Arachnida
- Order: Araneae
- Infraorder: Araneomorphae
- Family: Salticidae
- Genus: Portia
- Species: P. schultzi

Binomial name
- Portia schultzi Karsch, 1878

Synonyms
- Portia schultzii Karsch, 1878, orth. var.; Brettus martini Simon, 1900; Linus lesserti Lawrence, 1937; Linus alboguttatus Lawrence, 1938; Portia alboguttata (Lawrence, 1938)

= Portia schultzi =

Species of spider

Portia schultzi is a species of jumping spider which ranges from South Africa in the south to Kenya in the north, and also is found in West Africa and Madagascar. In this species, which is slightly smaller than some other species of the genus Portia, the bodies of females are 5 to 7 mm (0.20 to 0.28 in) long, while those of males are 4 to 6 mm (0.16 to 0.24 in) long. The carapaces of both sexes are orange-brown with dark brown mottling, and covered with dark brown and whitish hairs lying over the surface. Males have white tufts on their thoraces and a broad white band above the bases of the legs, and these features are less conspicuous in females. Both sexes have tufts of orange to dark orange above the eyes, which are fringed with pale orange hairs. Males' abdomens are yellow-orange to orange-brown with blackish mottling, and on the upper sides are black and light orange hairs, and nine white tufts. Those of females are pale yellow and have black markings with scattered white and orange-brown hairs on the upper side. P. schultzi has relatively longer legs than other Portia, and a "lolloping" gait.

While most jumping spiders focus accurately up to about 75 cm (30 in) away, P. schultzi responds to a maximum of about 10 cm (3.9 in) in good light, and ignores everything in very subdued light. For prey, P. schultzi prefers web-based spiders, then jumping spiders, and finally insects. The females of P. schultzi and other Portia species build "capture webs" to catch prey, and often join their own webs on to web-based spiders to catch the other spiders or their prey.

If a P. schultzi female is mature, a male P. schultzi will try to copulate with her, or cohabit with a subadult female and copulate while she is moulting. They usually mate on a web or on a dragline made by the female, and P. schultzi typically copulates for about 100 seconds, while others in the genus can take several minutes or even several hours. Females try to kill and eat their mates during or after copulation, and subadult females mimic adult females to attract males as prey. Contests between Portia females are violent, and embraces in P. schultzi typically take 20 to 60 seconds. Sometimes, one female knocks the other on her back and the other may be killed and eaten if she does not right herself quickly and run away. When hunting, P. schultzi mature females emit olfactory signals that reduce the risk that any other females, males, or juveniles of the same species may contend for the same prey.

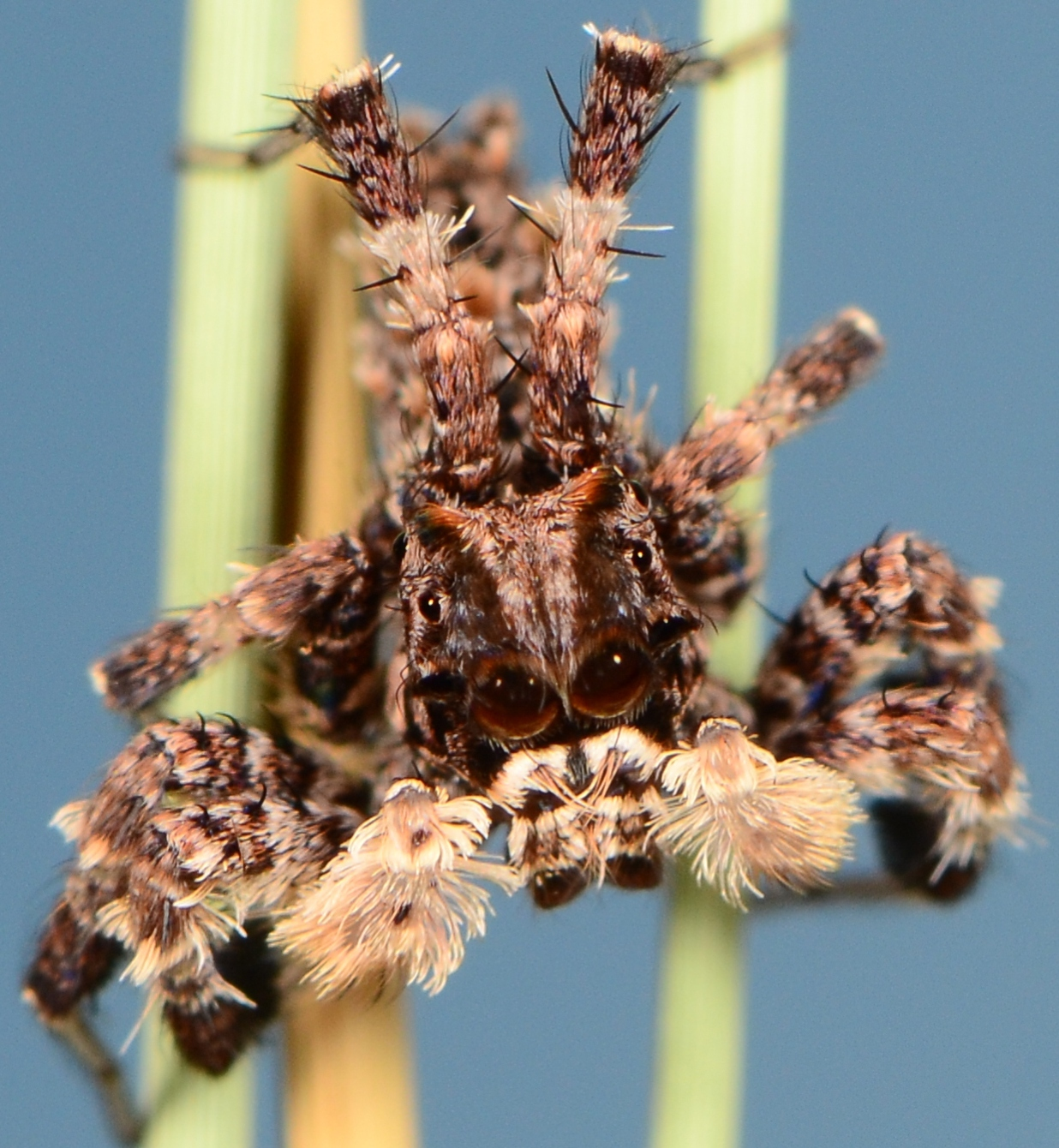
female

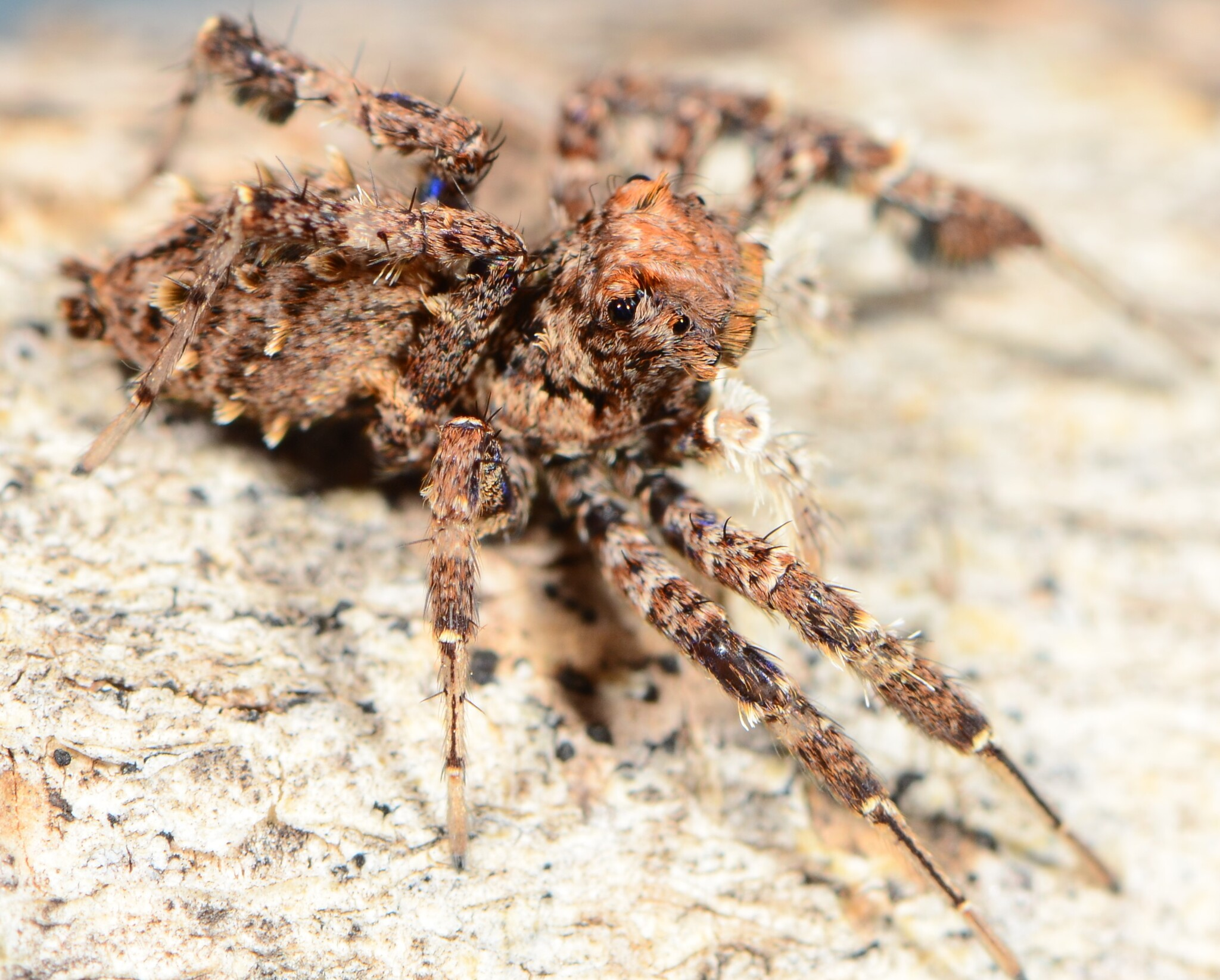
female

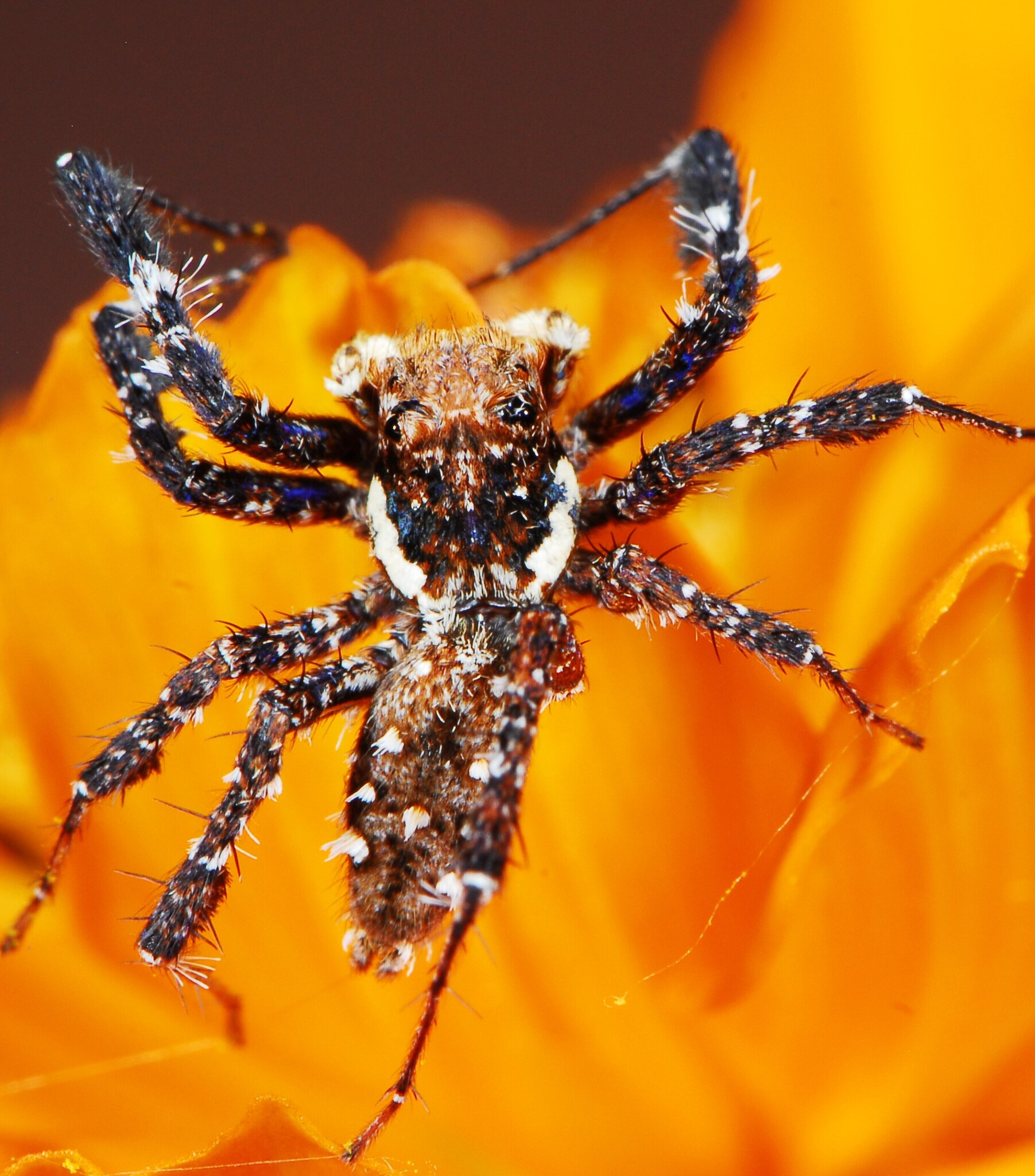
male

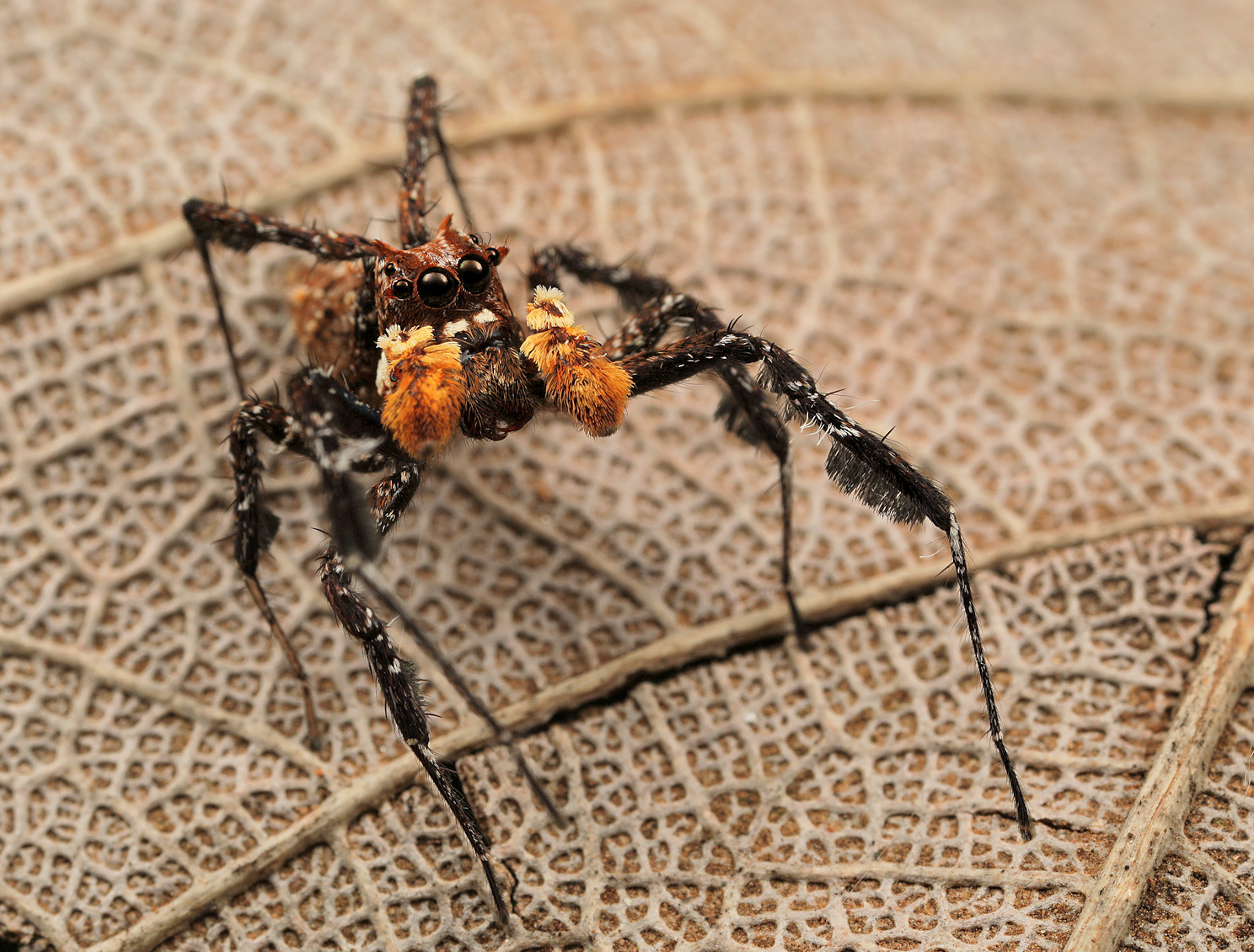
male

== Body structure and appearance ==
The bodies of female P. schultzis are 5 to 7 mm long (smaller than other Portia species), while those of males are 4 to 6 mm long. The carapaces of both sexes are orange-brown with dark brown mottling, and they are covered with dark brown and whitish hairs lying over the surface. Males have white tufts on their thoraxes and broad white band above the bases of the legs, and these features are less conspicuous in females. Both sexes have tufts of orange to dark orange above the eyes, which are fringed with pale orange hairs. Females' chelicerae are pale yellow with black markings at the ends, while males' are orange-brown with darker markings, and those of both sexes have pale orange and white hairs. The abdomens of females are pale yellow with black markings, and the upper sides have scattered white and orange-brown hairs. Males' abdomens are yellow-orange to orange-brown with blackish mottling, and on the upper sides are black and light orange hairs and nine white tufts. Those of females are pale yellow and have black markings with scattered white and orange-brown hairs on the upper side, but no tufts. The legs of both sexes are unusually long and slender, and those of males are orange-brown with darker markings while those of females are light yellow with blackish markings. In both sexes the final two segment of each leg has no other decorations, but the other segments in both sexes have brownish hairs and many robust spines, and those of males also have scattered white tufts. The palps of both sexes have pale yellow hairs and white fringes. All species of the genus Portia have elastic abdomens, so that those of both sexes can become almost spherical when well fed, and females' can stretch as much when producing eggs.

== Movement ==
When not hunting for prey or a mate, Portia species, including P. schultzi, adopt a special posture, called the "cryptic rest posture", pulling their legs in close to the body and their palps back beside the chelicerae ("jaws"), which obscures the outlines of these appendages. When walking, most Portia species have a slow, "choppy" gait that preserves their concealment: pausing often and at irregular intervals, waving their legs continuously and their palps jerkily up and down, moving each appendage out of time with the others, and continuously varying the speed and timing. P. schultzi uses what Forster and Murphy (1986) call a "lolloping" gait, flexing and stretching the legs. They suggest that the long legs are advantageous for moving through webs, and that lolloping enables P. schultzi to use the long legs while keeping the body near the surface.

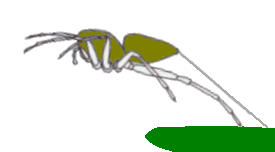
A spider at take-off when jumping fixes a dragline (safety line) just before jumping.

Like many species of spider, a P. schultzi lays a continuous dragline of silk as it moves, and from time to time anchors the dragline to a surface with a spot of sticky silk. This allows the spider to return to the surface if the animal is dislodged. A spider about to jump first lays a sticky silk anchor, and then lays out a dragline as it flies. Unlike those of most jumping spiders, P. schultzi′s draglines stick to each other and, when a P. schultzi has laid a few lines across a gap, it uses these as walkways and reinforces them with additional silk as it moves.

When disturbed, most leap upwards about 100 to 150 mm, often from the cryptic rest pose, and often over a wide trajectory. Usually Portia then either freezes or runs about 100 mm and then freezes.

== Senses ==
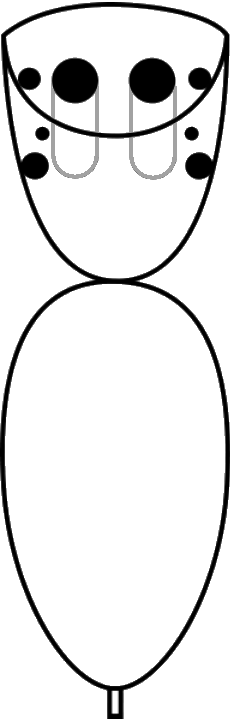
"Squared-off" cephalothorax and eye pattern of jumping spiders

Although other spiders can also jump, salticids including P. schultzi have significantly better vision than other spiders, and their main eyes are more acute in daylight than a cat's and 10 times more acute than a dragonfly's. Jumping spiders have eight eyes, the two large ones in the center-and-front position (the anteriomedian eyes, also called "principal eyes") housed in tubes in the head and providing acute vision. The other six are secondary eyes, positioned along the sides of the carapace and acting mainly as movement detectors. In most jumping spiders, the middle pair of secondary eyes is very small and has no known function, but those of Portia are relatively large, and function as well as those of the other secondary eyes. Jumping spiders' main eyes can see from red to ultraviolet.

In most jumping spiders, the main eyes focus accurately on an object up to about 75 cm away. However, P. schultzi does not react at all to objectives when the light is under 100 lux. Between 100 and 500 lux, it detects and approaches the objective from distances up to 6 cm, from 500 lux to 1500 lux, its response distance increases gradually to a maximum of about 10 cm, and stronger light causes no increase in the response distance. For comparison, Trite auricoma swivels towards a movement up to 75 cm away and approaches targets from about 20 cm. Perhaps P. schultzi gains little from being alerted to objectives at distances because this spider moves so slowly that it is very unlikely to reach a more distant target in time to catch it.

Like all jumping spiders, P. schultzi can take in only a small visual field at one time, as the most acute part of a main eye can see all of a circle up to 12 millimeters wide at 20 centimeters away, or up to 18 millimeters wide at 30 centimeters away. (Note: Jackson and Blest (1982) say, "The resolution of the receptor mosaic of Layer I in the central retina was estimated to be a visual angle of 2.4 arc min, corresponding to 0-12 mm at 20 cm in front of the spider, or 0-18 mm at 30 cm.") A Portia spider takes a relatively long time to see objects, possibly because getting a good image out of such tiny eyes is a complex process and needs a lot of scanning. (Note: The retina is at the end of a tube. The inner end of the tube moves from side to side in one to two cycles per second, and twists 50° in a cycle that takes 10 seconds.) This makes a Portia vulnerable to much larger predators such as birds, frogs, and mantises, which it often cannot identify because of the other predator's size.

Spiders, like other arthropods, have sensors, often modified setae (bristles), for smell, taste, touch and vibration protruding through their cuticle ("skin"). Unlike insects, spiders and other chelicerates do not have antennae. A Portia can sense vibrations from surfaces, and use these for mating and for hunting other spiders in total darkness. It can use air- and surface "smells" to detect prey which it often meets, to identify members of the same species, to recognise familiar members, and to determine the sex of other member of the same species.

== Hunting tactics ==
=== Tactics used by most jumping spiders and by most of genus Portia ===
Members of the genus Portia have hunting tactics as versatile and adaptable as a lion's. All members of Portia have instinctive tactics for their most common prey, but can improvise by trial and error against unfamiliar prey or in unfamiliar situations, and then remember the new approach. They can also make detours to find the best attack angle against dangerous prey, even when the best detour takes it out of visual contact with the prey, and sometimes the planned route leads to abseiling down a silk thread and biting the prey from behind. Such detours may take up to an hour, and it usually picks the best route even if it needs to walk past an incorrect route. If a Portia spider makes a mistake while hunting another spider, it may itself be killed.

While most jumping spiders prey mainly on insects and by active hunting, females of Portia also build webs to catch prey directly. These "capture webs" are funnel-shaped and widest at the top and are about 4,000 cm^{3} in volume. The web is initially built in about 2 hours, and then gradually made stronger. A Portia spider often joins her own web on to one of a web-based nonsalticid spider. When not joined to another spiders', a P. schultzi female's capture web may be suspended from rigid foundations such as boughs and rocks, or from pliant bases such as stems of shrubs. Males of Portia do not build capture webs.

Portias hunt in all types of webs, while other cursorial spiders generally have difficulty moving on webs, and web-building spiders find it difficult to move in webs unlike those they build. Where the web is sparse, a Portia will use "rotary probing", in which it moves a free leg around until it meets a thread. When hunting in another spider's web, a Portia′s slow, choppy movements and the flaps on its legs make it resemble leaf detritus caught in the web and blown in a breeze. P. schultzi and some other Portias use breezes and other disturbances as "smokescreens" in which these predators can approach web spiders more quickly, and revert to a more cautious approach when the disturbance disappears. A few web spiders run far away when they sense the un-rhythmical gait of a Portia entering the web - a reaction Wilcox and Jackson call "Portia panic".

If a large insect is struggling in a web, Portia usually does not usually take the insect, but waits for up to a day until the insect stops struggling, even if the prey is thoroughly stuck. When an insect stuck in a web owned by P. schultzi, P. labiata or any regional variant of P. fimbriata, and next to a web spider's web, the web spider sometimes enters the Portia′s web, and the Portia pursues and catches the web spider.

The webs of spiders on which Portias prey sometimes contain dead insects and other arthropods which are uneaten or partly eaten. P. schultzi and some other Portias such as P. fimbriata (in Queensland) and P. labiata sometimes scavenge these corpses if the corpses are not obviously decayed.

A Portia typically takes 3 to 5 minutes to pursuit prey, but some pursuits can take much longer, and in extreme cases close to 10 hours when pursuing a web-based spider.

All Portias eat eggs of other spiders, including eggs of their own species and of other cursorial spiders, and can extract eggs from cases ranging from the flimsy ones of Pholcus to the tough papery ones of Philoponella. While only P. fimbriata (in Queensland) captures cursorial spiders in their nests, all Portias steal eggs from empty nests of cursorial spiders.

Portias' venom is unusually powerful against spiders. When a Portia stabs a small to medium spider (up to the Portia′s weight), including another Portia, the prey usually runs away for about 100 to 200 millimetres, enters convulsions, becomes paralysed after 10 to 30 seconds, and continues convulsing for 10 seconds to 4 minutes. Portia slowly approaches the prey and takes it. Portia usually needs to inflict up to 15 stabbings to completely immobilise a larger spider(1.5 to 2 times to the Portia′s weight), and then Portia may wait about 20 to 200 millimetres away for 15 to 30 minutes from seizing the prey. Insects are usually not immobilised so quickly but continue to struggle, sometimes for several minutes. If Portia cannot make further contact, all types of prey usually recover, making sluggish movements several minutes after the stabbing but often starting normal movement only after an hour.

Occasionally a Portia is killed or injured while pursuing prey up to twice Portia′s size. In tests, P. schultzi is killed in 1.7% of pursuits and injured but not killed in 5.3%, P. labiata is killed in 2.1% and injured but not killed in 3.9%, and P. fimbriata in Queensland is killed in 0.06% of its pursuits and injured but not killed in another 0.06%. A Portia′s especially tough skin often prevents injury, even when its body is caught in the other spider's fangs. When injured, Portia bleeds and may sometimes loses one or more legs. Spiders' palps and legs break off easily when attacked, Portia′s palps and legs break off exceptionally easily, which may be a defence mechanism, and Portias are often seen with missing legs or palps, while other salticids in the same habitat are not seen with missing legs or palps.

=== Tactics used by Portia schultzi ===
All performance statistics summarise result of tests in a laboratory, using captive specimens. The following table shows the hunting performance of adult females. In addition to P. schultzi, the table shows for comparison the hunting performances of P. africana, P. labiata and three regional variants of P. fimbriata.

Differences in hunting tactics of females
| Prey | Performance | P. schultzi | P. africana | P. labiata | P. fimbriata (Q) | P. fimbriata (NT) | P. fimbriata (SL) |
|---|---|---|---|---|---|---|---|
| Salticid | Tendency to pursue prey | 58% | 77% | 63% | 87% | 50% | 94% |
| Salticid | Efficiency in capturing prey | 36% | 29% | 40% | 93% | 10% | 45% |
| Web-building spider | Tendency to pursue prey | 84% | 74% | 83% | 91% | 94% | 64% |
| Web-building spider | Efficiency in capturing prey | 72% | 65% | 79% | 92% | 81% | 83% |
| Insect | Tendency to pursue prey | 52% | 48% | 35% | 27% | 30% | 43% |
| Insect | Efficiency in capturing prey | 69% | 67% | 71% | 41% | 83% | 78% |

Notes on this table:

- "Tendency to pursue prey" is the percentage of tests in which the subject pursues the potential prey, and a pursuit starts when the Portia either approaches the prey or shakes the prey's web.
- "Efficiency in capturing prey" is the percentage of pursuits in which the subject captures the prey.
- P. schultzi specimens from Kenya were used in this analysis.
- "(Q)", "(NT)" and "(SL)" identify P. fimbriatas from Queensland, Northern Territory and Sri Lanka.
- The prey used were: unspecified jumping spiders; amaurobiid and theridiid web-based spiders; and houseflies.

For resting, all Portias spin a horizontal web whose diameter is about twice the spider's body length and is suspended only 1 to 4 millimetres below a leaf. P. schultzi returns to its resting platform at night. While eating prey at dusk and with no platform nearby, one P. schultzi built a silk platform while holding the prey, and then continued eating.

P. schultzi does not respond to prey if the light is under 100 lux (like a restaurant with only subdued artificial lighting), but responds to prey at distances from 6 to 10 centimetres as the light level increases. A test suggested that P. schultzi′s hunting is stimulated only by vision, as prey close but hidden caused no response. A preliminary check showed that lures got the same responses from P. schultzi as live prey, and then more detailed testing with the lures showed that: if the target moved erratically, P. schultzi did not pursue it; if the target was totally stationary, the spider approached very slow (between 5 and 100 millimetres per minute), with very long pauses in the final stages, and the sequence was not completed in 43% of cases; if the lure jiggled on the same spot, P. schultzi approached much faster and the sequence was almost always completed; if a lure was pulled directly away from P. schultzi, the spider followed, and faster if the lure was pulled, up to a limit (P. schultzi generally moves very slowly).

A female P. schultzi more often pursues small jumping spiders and web spiders than larger prey. While it more often catches small jumping spiders than larger ones, it is about equally effective with all sizes of web spiders up to twice P. schultzi′s size. A female P. schultzi is effective against insects up to twice P. schultzi′s size when the insect is stuck in a non-salticid's web, and against insects not in webs and up to P. schultzi′s size, while P. schultzi seldom pursues or catches a larger insect in the open. A female P. schultzi very seldom pursues or catches a larger insect in her own web, and is slightly less effective against smaller insects in P. schultzi′s web than in other situations. Males are less efficient in all cases.

A test in 1997 showed that P. schultzi′s preferences for different types of prey are in the order: web spiders; jumping spiders; and insects. These preferences apply to both live prey and motionless lures, and to P. schultzi specimens without prey for 7 days ("well-fed") and without prey for 14 days ("starved"). P. schultzi specimens without prey for 21 days ("extra-starved") showed no preference for different types of prey. The test included as prey several species of web spiders and jumping spiders, and the selection of the prey species showed no evidence of affecting the results. Insects were represented by the house fly Musca domestica.

In a test, P. schultzi spiderlings took Drosophila ("fruit flies") almost as often as spiders. P. schultzi retreats from the sudden flights of houseflies found in the open, but sometimes takes flies entangled in a web. Out of its web, P. schultzi rarely capture thomisids (non-web sit-and-wait predators, usually under 13 millimetres long) in the open, as thomisids often wave their front legs when threatened.

If a spider walks under a P. schultzi female's capture web and the vertical distance is less than 8 centimetres, the P. schultzi often drops onto the prey too fast for a human eye to follow. If the P. schultzi misses, it quickly returns up its safety line to its vantage point and looks for another chance - and seldom misses the second time. Most drops cover two to four centimetres, as longer drops are often obstructed by the web.

When hunting a web spider in the prey's web, a P. schultzi walks very slowly towards the prey and then, when two to three centimetres away, pauses for some minutes. During this time the P. schultzi quivers very quickly with its whole body at regular intervals. In almost all cases the prey stays motionless. P. schultzi never plucks the web as Portia fimbriata does.

Unlike the Queensland variant of P. frimbriata, P. schultzi has no special tactics when hunting other jumping spiders.

When hunting, mature females of P. fimbriata, P. africana, P. fimbriata, P. labiata, and P. schultzi emit olfactory signals that reduce the risk that any other females, males or juveniles of the same species may contend for the same prey. The effect inhibits aggressive mimicry against a prey spider even if the prey spider is visible, and also if the prey is inhabiting any part of a web. If a female of one of these Portias smells a male of the same species, the female stimulates the males to court. These Portia species do not show this behaviour when they receive olfactory signals from members of other Portia species.

== Reproduction and lifecycle ==
Before courtship, a male Portia spins a small web between boughs or twigs, and he hangs under that and ejaculates on to it. He then soaks the semen into reservoirs on his pedipalps, which are larger than those of females. Females of many spider species, including P. schultzi, emit volatile pheromones into the air, and these generally attract males from a distance.

Among P. schultzi and some other Portias, when adults of the same species but opposite sexes recognise each other, they display at 10 to 30 centimetres. Males usually wait for 2 to 15 minutes before starting a display, but sometimes a female starts a display first. Portias sometimes use "propulsive displays", with which a member threatens a rival of the same species and sex, and unreceptive females also threaten males in this way. A propulsive display is a series of sudden, quick movements including striking, charging, ramming and leaps. In P. schultzi and in some other species, contests between males usually last only 5 to 10 seconds, and only their legs make contact. Contests between Portia females are violent and embraces in P. schultzi typically take 20 to 60 seconds. These occasionally include grappling that sometimes breaks a leg, but more usually the final move is a lunge. Sometimes one knocks the other on her back and the other may be killed and eaten if she does not right herself quickly and run away. If the loser has a nest, the winner takes over and eats any eggs there.

A female P. schultzi that sees a male may approach slowly or wait. The male then walks erect and displaying by waving his legs and palps. If the female does not run away, she gives a propulsive display first. If the male stands his ground and she does not run away or repeat the propulsive display, he approaches and, if she is mature, they copulate. If the female is sub-adult (one moult from maturity), a male may cohabit in the female's capture web. Portias usually mate on a web or on a dragline made by the female. P. schultzi typically copulates for about 100 seconds, while other genera can take several minutes or even several hours.

Females of P. schultzi, like those of P. labiata, try to kill and eat their mates during or after copulation, by twisting and lunging. The males wait until the females have hunched their legs, making this attack less likely. Males also try to abseil from a silk thread to approach from above, but females may manoeuvre to get the higher position. If the female moves at all, the male leaps and runs away.

Before being mature enough to mate, females of P. shultzi and also P. labiata mimic adult females to attract males as prey.

P. schultzi usually lays eggs on dead, brown leaves about 20 millimetres long, suspended near the top of its capture web, and then cover the eggs with a sheet of silk. If there is no dead leaf available, the female will make a small horizontal silk platform in the capture web, lay the eggs on it, and then cover the eggs. P. schultzi has been seen laying eggs in a rolled-up leaf in a web of Ischnothele karschi. (Note: What Forster & Murphy (1986) call Ischnothele karschi has since 1995 to 2011 called Thelechoris striatipes.)

For moulting, all Portias spin a horizontal web whose diameter is about twice the spider's body length and is suspended only 1 to 4 millimetres (0.039 to 0.157 in) below a leaf. The spider lies head down, and often slides down 20 to 30 millimetres (0.79 to 1.18 in) during moulting. Portias spin a similar temporary web for resting. Like all arthropods, spiders moult and, after hatching, the life stage before each moult is called an "instar". The distinctive tufts of P. schultzi juveniles appear in the third instar.

P. schultzi exuviae (discarded "skins") have been found both in their own webs and in those of I. karschi, which has suggested that P. schultzi moults in the open. In one case, while its new skin was still pale and soft, its spinnerets were still stuck in the discarded skin, and the spider slowly twirled for about 90 seconds until it was free. The spider's body then darkened quickly to the normal colouration, and some time later the spider hung in its usual upside-down posture in the web.

== Ecology ==
P. schultzi′s range runs from Durban (in South Africa) in the south to Malindi (in Kenya) in the north, and westwards to the East African Rift, and also in West Africa and Madagascar.

P. schultzi, along with a large variety of spiders and insects, is often found in the dense, large webs of the diplurid Ischnothele karschi (about 15 millimetres long), which are especially abundant in partly cleared secondary bush where rain forests have been cut down, and usually about one metre above the ground. A survey of one area suggested that there is about one P. schultzi per three I. karschi webs. P. schultzi is also found in its own web and those of other spiders, on tree trunks and the walls of buildings, and in leaf litter.

== Taxonomy ==
P. schultzi is one of 17 species in the genus Portia as of June 2011. Portia schultzi Karsch, 1878 is synonymous with Brettus martini Simon, 1900, Linus lesserti Lawrence, 1937 and Linus alboguttatus Lawrence, 1938.

Wanless divided the genus Portia into two species groups: the schultzi group, in which males' palps have a fixed tibial apophysis; and the kenti group, in which the apophysis of each palp in the males has a joint separated by a membrane. The schultzi group includes P. schultzi, P. africana, P. fimbriata, and P. labiata.

Portia is in the subfamily Spartaeinae, which is thought to be primitive. Molecular phylogeny, a technique that compares the DNA of organisms to reconstruct the tree of life, indicates that Portia is a member of the clade Spartaeinae, that Spartaeinae is basal (quite similar to the ancestors of all jumping spiders), that Portia′s closest relative is the genus Spartaeus, and that the next closest are Phaeacius and Holcolaetis.
