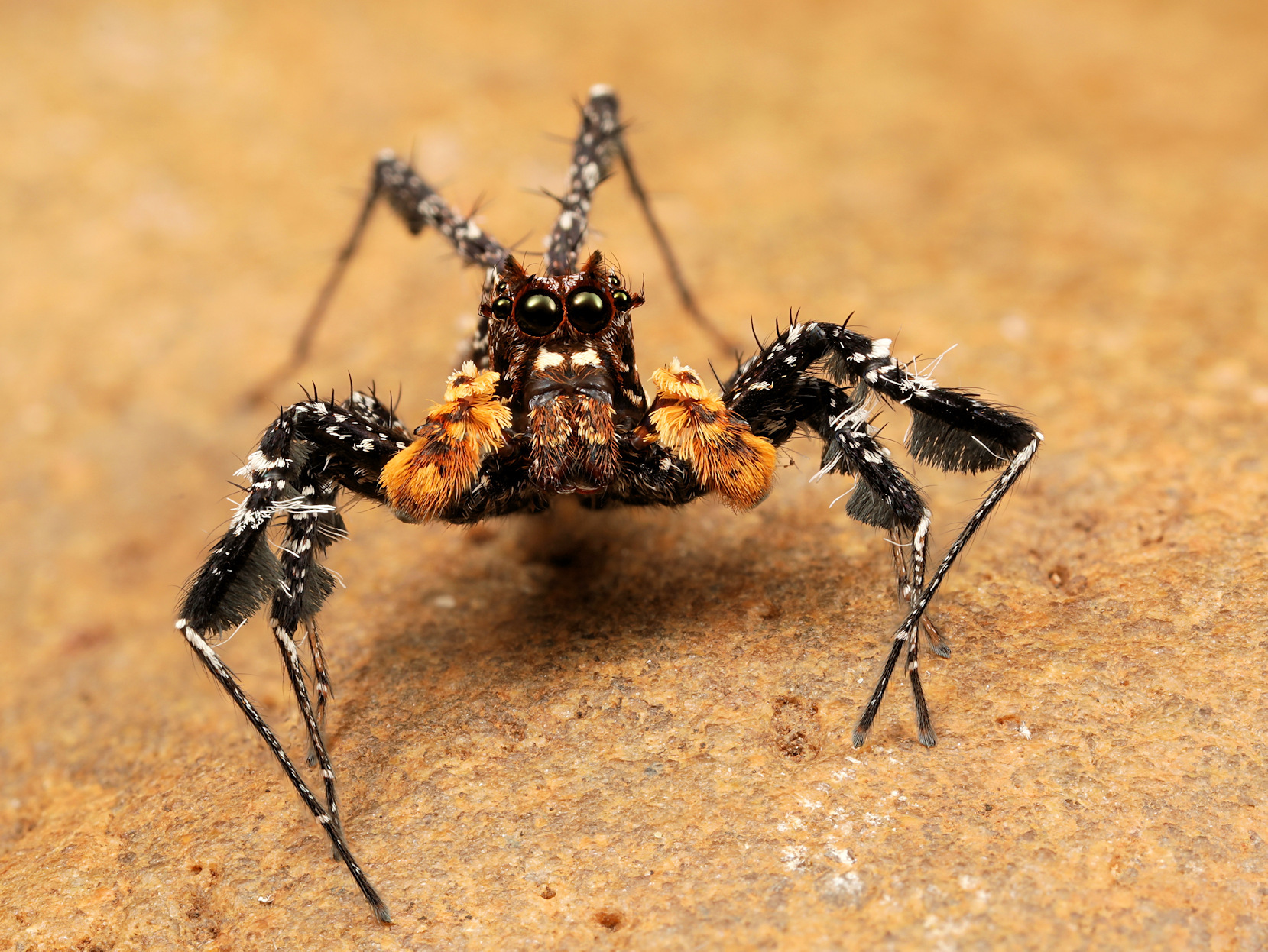
- Male P. schultzi
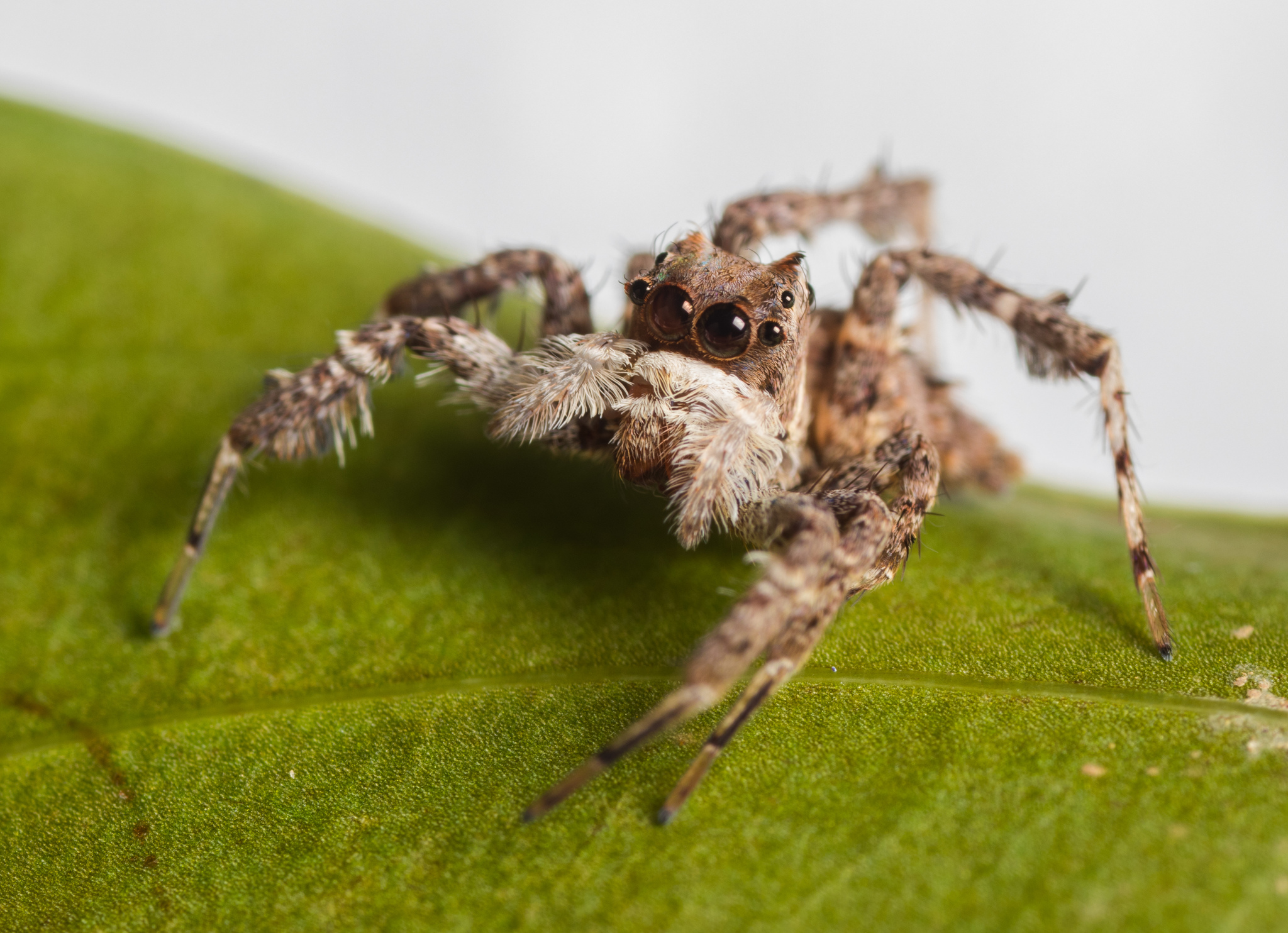
- Female P. orientalis

Scientific classification
- Kingdom: Animalia
- Phylum: Arthropoda
- Subphylum: Chelicerata
- Class: Arachnida
- Order: Araneae
- Infraorder: Araneomorphae
- Family: Salticidae
- Subfamily: Spartaeinae
- Genus: Portia; Karsch, 1878

Type species
- Salticus fimbriatus Doleschall, 1859

Species
- See text

Diversity
- 20 species
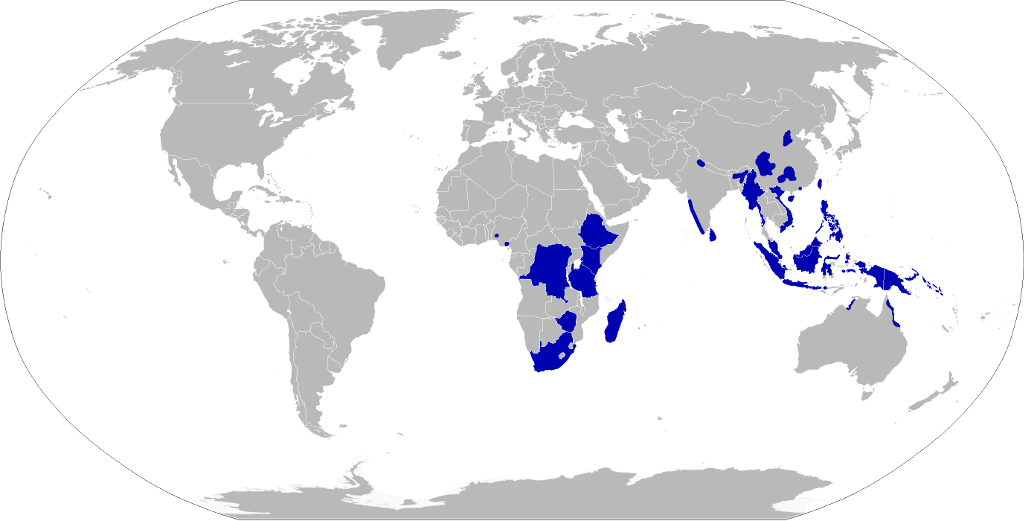

= Portia (spider) =

Genus of spiders

Portia is a genus of jumping spider that feeds on other spiders (i.e., they are arachnophagic). They are remarkable for their intelligent hunting behaviour, which suggests that they are capable of learning and problem solving, traits normally attributed to much larger animals.

== Taxonomy and evolution ==
The genus was established in 1878 by German arachnologist Ferdinand Karsch. The fringed jumping spider (Portia fimbriata) is the type species.

Molecular phylogeny, a technique that compares the DNA of organisms to construct the tree of life, indicates that Portia is a member of a basal clade (i.e. quite similar to the ancestors of all jumping spiders) and that the Spartaeus, Phaeacius, and Holcolaetis genera are its closest relatives.

Wanless divided the genus Portia into two species groups: the schultzi group, in which males' palps have a fixed tibial apophysis; and the kenti group, in which the apophysis of each palp in the males has a joint separated by a membrane. The schultzi group includes P. schultzi, P. africana, P. fimbriata, and P. labiata.

At least some species of Portia are in the state of reproductive isolation: in a laboratory, male P. africana copulated with female P. labiata, but no eggs were laid; during all cases, the female P. labiata twisted and lunged in an attempt to bite.

Some specimens found trapped in Oligocene amber were identified as related to Portia.

== Distribution and ecology ==
The 17 described species are found in Africa, Australia, China, Madagascar, Malaysia, Myanmar, Nepal, India, the Philippines, Sri Lanka, Taiwan, and Vietnam.

Portia are vulnerable to larger predators such as birds and frogs, which a Portia often cannot identify because of the predator's size. Some insects prey on Portia, for example, mantises, the assassin bugs Nagusta sp. indet. and Scipinnia repax (that is, Scipinia rapax).

== Appearance ==
Portia are relatively small spiders. For example, adult females of Portia africana are 5 to 10 millimetres (3/16 to 3/8 in) in body length and adult males are 5 to 7 millimetres (3/16 to 1/4 in) long.

== Intelligence ==
Portia often hunt in ways that seem intelligent. All members of Portia have instinctive hunting tactics for their most common prey, but can improvise by trial and error against unfamiliar prey or in unfamiliar situations, and then remember the new approach.

They exhibit spatial memory and object permanence, and are capable of trying out a behavior to obtain feedback regarding success or failure, and they can plan ahead (as it seems from their detouring behavior).

Portia species can make detours to find the best attack angle against dangerous prey, even when the best detour takes a Portia out of visual contact with the prey, and sometimes the planned route leads to abseiling down a silk thread and biting the prey from behind. Such detours may take up to an hour, and a Portia usually picks the best route even if it needs to walk past an incorrect route.

Nonetheless, they seem to be relatively slow thinkers, as is to be expected since they solve tactical problems by using brains vastly smaller than those of mammalian predators. Portia has a brain significantly smaller than the size of the head of a pin, and it likely has less than 100,000 neurons (for comparison, a mouse brain has about 70 million neurons and a human brain has 86 billion).

Portia can distinguish their own draglines from conspecifics', recognizing self from others, and also discriminate between known and unknown spiders.

== Hunting techniques ==
Their favorite prey appears to be web-building spiders between 10% and 200% of their own size. Many species of Portia have protrusions of clusters of hairs on their cephalothorax, legs, and abdomen that when combined allow the spider to look like leaf detritus caught in a web, and this is often enough to fool web-building spiders, which have poor eyesight. One of the most famous examples of these protrusions is the fringed jumping spider, Portia fimbriata, which has many of these protrusions, the most pronounced of which being the two tufts above its eyes.

When stalking web-building spiders, Portia try to make different patterns of vibrations in the web that aggressively mimic the struggle of a trapped insect or the courtship signals of a male spider, repeating any pattern that induces the intended prey to move towards the Portia. Portia fimbriata has been observed to perform vibratory behavior for three days until the victim decided to investigate. They time invasions of webs to coincide with light breezes that blur the vibrations that their approach causes in the target's web, and they back off if the intended victim responds belligerently. Other jumping spiders take detours, but Portia is unusual in its readiness to use long detours that break visual contact.

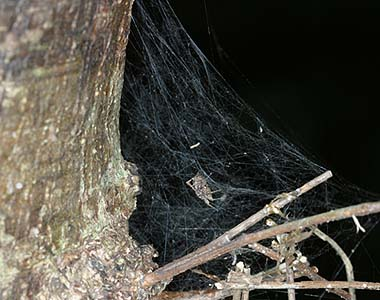
Female P. fimbriata in a web

Laboratory studies show that Portia learns very quickly how to overcome web-building spiders that neither it nor its ancestors would have met in the wild. Portia's accurate visual recognition of potential prey is an important part of its hunting tactics. For example, in one part of the Philippines, local Portia spiders attack from the rear against the very dangerous spitting spiders, which themselves hunt jumping spiders. This appears to be an instinctive behavior, as laboratory-reared Portia of this species do this the first time they encounter a spitting spider. On the other hand, they will use a head-on approach against spitting spiders that are carrying eggs. However, experiments that pitted Portia against "convincing" artificial spiders with arbitrary but consistent behavior patterns showed that Portia's instinctive tactics are only starting points for a trial-and-error approach from which these spiders learn very quickly.

Against other jumping spiders, which also have excellent vision, Portia may mimic fragments of leaf litter detritus. When close to biting range, Portia use different combat tactics against different prey spiders. On the other hand, when attacking unarmed prey, such as flies, they simply stalk and rush, and they also capture prey by means of sticky webs.

Portia can also rely on movement cues to locate prey. In this specific strategy, when potential prey knows it's been seen and stands still to avoid detection, undirected leaps occur in the vicinity of the prey. As a result, the prey will then react to this visual cue, believing itself to have been seen, providing motion that allows Portia to see and attack it.

Portia may also scavenge the corpses of dead arthropods they have found, and consume nectar.

== Social behavior ==
Members of the species Portia africana were observed living together and sharing prey.

If a mature Portia male meets a sub-mature female, he will try to cohabitate with her.

P. labiata females can discriminate between the draglines of familiar and unfamiliar individuals of the same species and between their own draglines and those of conspecifics. The ability to recognize individuals is a necessary prerequisite for social behavior.

== Vision ==
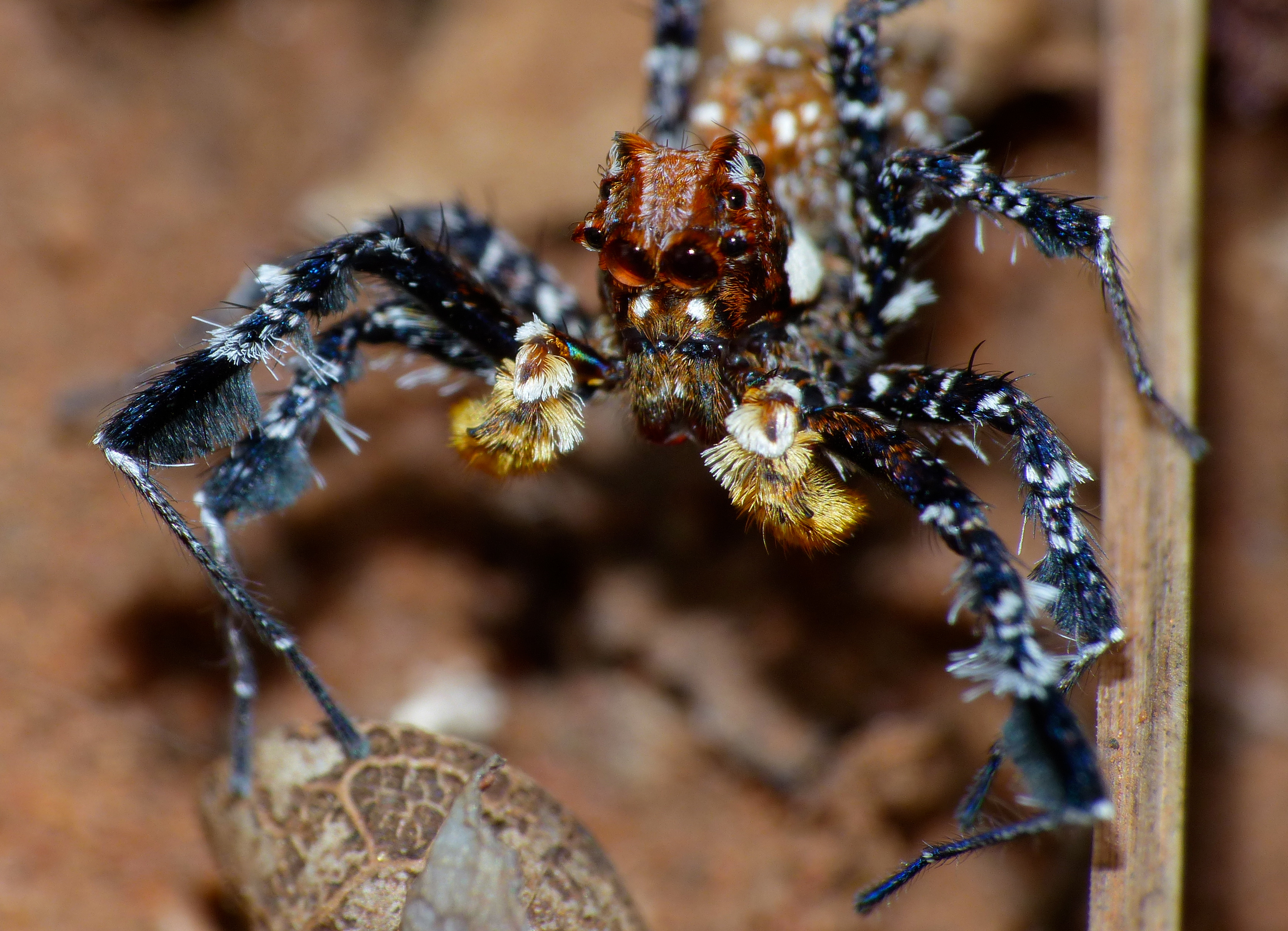
eyes of Portia schultzi

Diagram of the visual fields of the spider as viewed from above

Portia species have complex eyes that support exceptional spatial acuity. They have eight eyes. Three pairs of eyes positioned along the sides of the cephalothorax (called the secondary eyes) have a combined field-of-view of almost 360° and serve primarily as movement detectors. A pair of forward-facing anterior median eyes (called the principal eyes) are adapted for colour vision and high spatial acuity.

The main eyes focus accurately on an object at distances from approximately 2 centimetres (0.79 in) to infinity, and in practice can see up to about 75 centimetres (30 in). Like all jumping spiders, its main eyes can take in only a small visual field at one time, as the most acute part of a main eye can see all of a circle up to 12 millimetres (1/2 in) wide at 20 centimetres (8 in) away, or up to 18 millimetres (3/4 in) wide at 30 centimetres (12 in) away. Jumping spiders' main eyes can see from red to ultraviolet.

The secondary eyes have low spatial resolving power, but a wide field of view.

The inter-receptor angles of Portia's eyes may be as small as 2.4 minutes of arc, which is only six times worse than in humans, and is six times better than in the most acute insect eye. It is also clearer in daylight than a cat's vision.

P. africana relies on visual features of general morphology and colour (or relative brightness) when identifying prey types. P. schultzi's hunting is stimulated only by vision, and prey close by but hidden causes no response. P. fimbriata use visual cues to distinguish members of the same species from other salticids.

Cross and Jackson (2014) suggest that P. africana is capable of mentally rotating visual objects held in its working memory.

However, a Portia takes a relatively long time to see objects, possibly because getting a good image out of such small eyes is a complex process and requires a lot of scanning.^{[e]} This makes a Portia vulnerable to much larger predators such as birds, frogs and mantises, which a Portia often cannot identify because of the predator's size.

== Movement ==
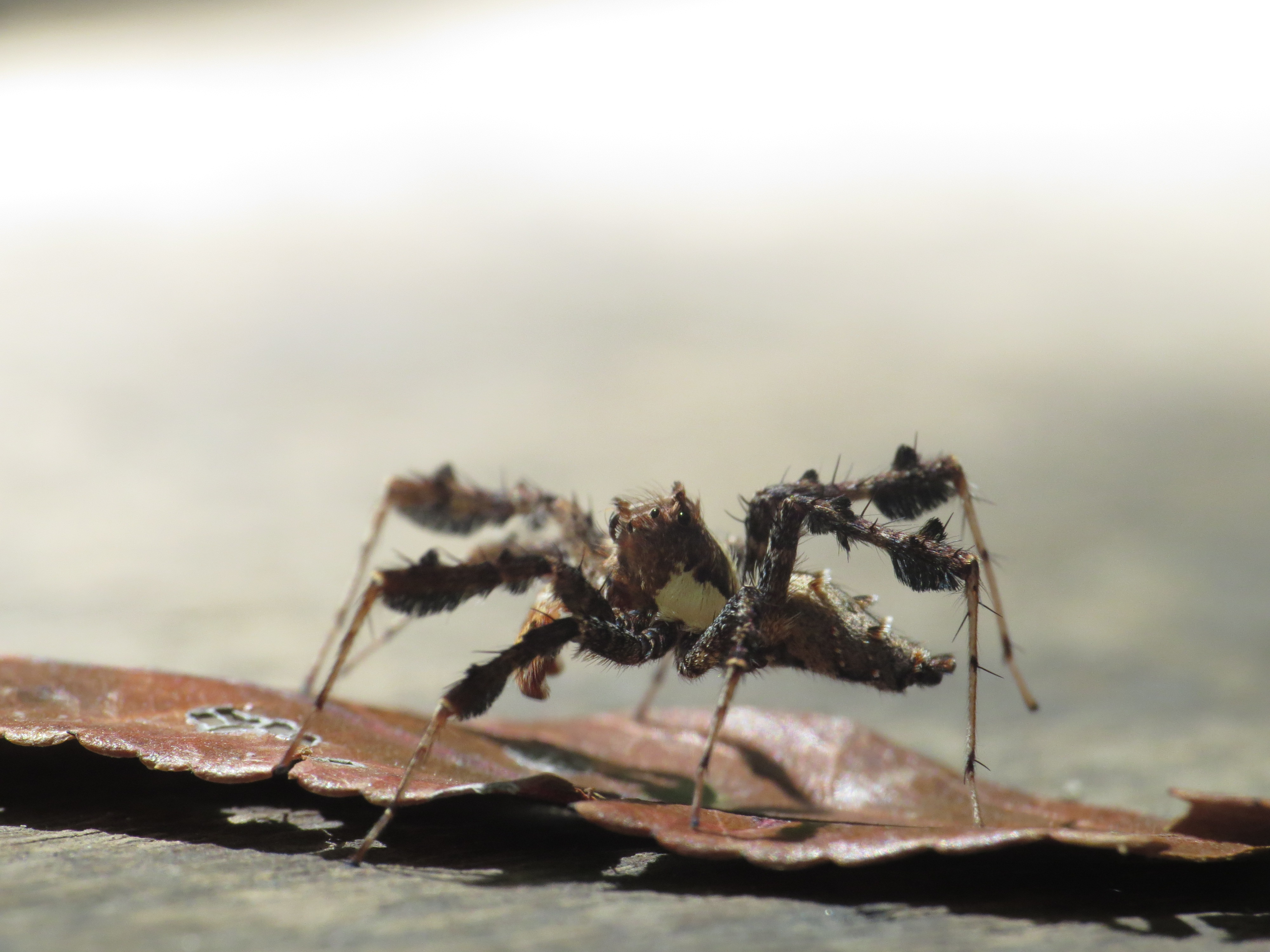
Portia fimbriata photographed during movement

External videos
- Portia schultzi moving on a human hand on YouTube

When not hunting for prey or a mate, Portia species adopt a special posture, called the "cryptic rest posture", pulling their legs in close to the body and their palps back beside the chelicerae ("jaws"), which obscures the outlines of these appendages. When walking, most Portia species have a slow, "choppy" gait that preserves their concealment: pausing often and at irregular intervals; waving their legs continuously and their palps jerkily up and down; moving each appendage out of time with the others; and continuously varying the speed and timing.

When disturbed, some Portia species are known to leap upwards about 100 to 150 millimetres (4 to 6 in) often from the cryptic rest pose, and often over a wide trajectory. Usually the spider then either freezes or runs about 100 millimetres (4 in) and then freezes.

== Reproduction ==
Portia exhibits a mating behavior and strategy different from that of other jumping spiders. In most jumping spiders, males mount females to mate. The Portia male shows off his legs and extends them stiffly and shakes them to attract the female. The female then drums on the web. After the male mounts her, the female drops a dragline and they mate in mid-air. Mating with Portia spiders can occur off or on the web. The spider also practices cannibalism before and after copulation. The female usually twists and lunges at the mounted male. (P. fimbriata, however, is an exception; it does not usually exhibit such behavior.) If the male is killed before completing copulation, the male sperm is removed and the male is then eaten. If the male finishes mating before being killed, the sperm is kept for fertilization and the male is eaten. A majority of males are killed during sexual encounters.

== Health ==
Portia species have a life span of about 1.5 years.

P. fimbriata can regenerate a lost limb about 7 days after moulting.

Portia's palps and legs break off very easily, which may be a defense mechanism, and Portias are often seen with missing legs or palps.

== Species ==
As of October 2025, this genus includes twenty species:

- Portia africana (Simon, 1886) – West, Central Africa, Ethiopia, Uganda, Angola, Zambia, Mozambique
- Portia albimana (Simon, 1900) – Pakistan, India to Vietnam
- Portia assamensis Wanless, 1978 – India to Malaysia
- Portia bawang Xu, Peng & Li, 2021 – China (Hainan)
- Portia crassipalpis (G. W. Peckham & E. G. Peckham, 1907) – Singapore, Malaysia (Borneo)
- Portia erlangping Xu, Peng & Li, 2021 – China
- Portia fajing Xu, Peng & Li, 2021 – China
- Portia fimbriata (Doleschall, 1859) – India, Sri Lanka, Nepal, China, Taiwan to Australia
- Portia heteroidea Xie & Yin, 1991 – China
- Portia hoggi Żabka, 1985 – Vietnam
- Portia labiata (Thorell, 1887) – India, Sri Lanka to China, Thailand, Vietnam, Philippines
- Portia orientalis J. Murphy & F. Murphy, 1983 – China
- Portia quei Żabka, 1985 – China, Vietnam
- Portia schultzi Karsch, 1878 – Central, East, Southern Africa, Mayotte, Madagascar (type species)
- Portia songi Tang & Yang, 1997 – China
- Portia strandi Caporiacco, 1941 – Ethiopia
- Portia taiwanica Zhang & Li, 2005 – Taiwan
- Portia wui Peng & Li, 2002 – China
- Portia xishan Xu, Peng & Li, 2021 – China
- Portia zhaoi Peng, Li & Chen, 2003 – China

== In popular literature ==
Portia jumping spiders as the dominant species evolving on a terraformed planet feature prominently in the science fiction novel Children of Time by the writer Adrian Tchaikovsky.

An intelligent slime mold named after the genus acts as a minor antagonist in the Peter Watts science fiction novel Echopraxia.
