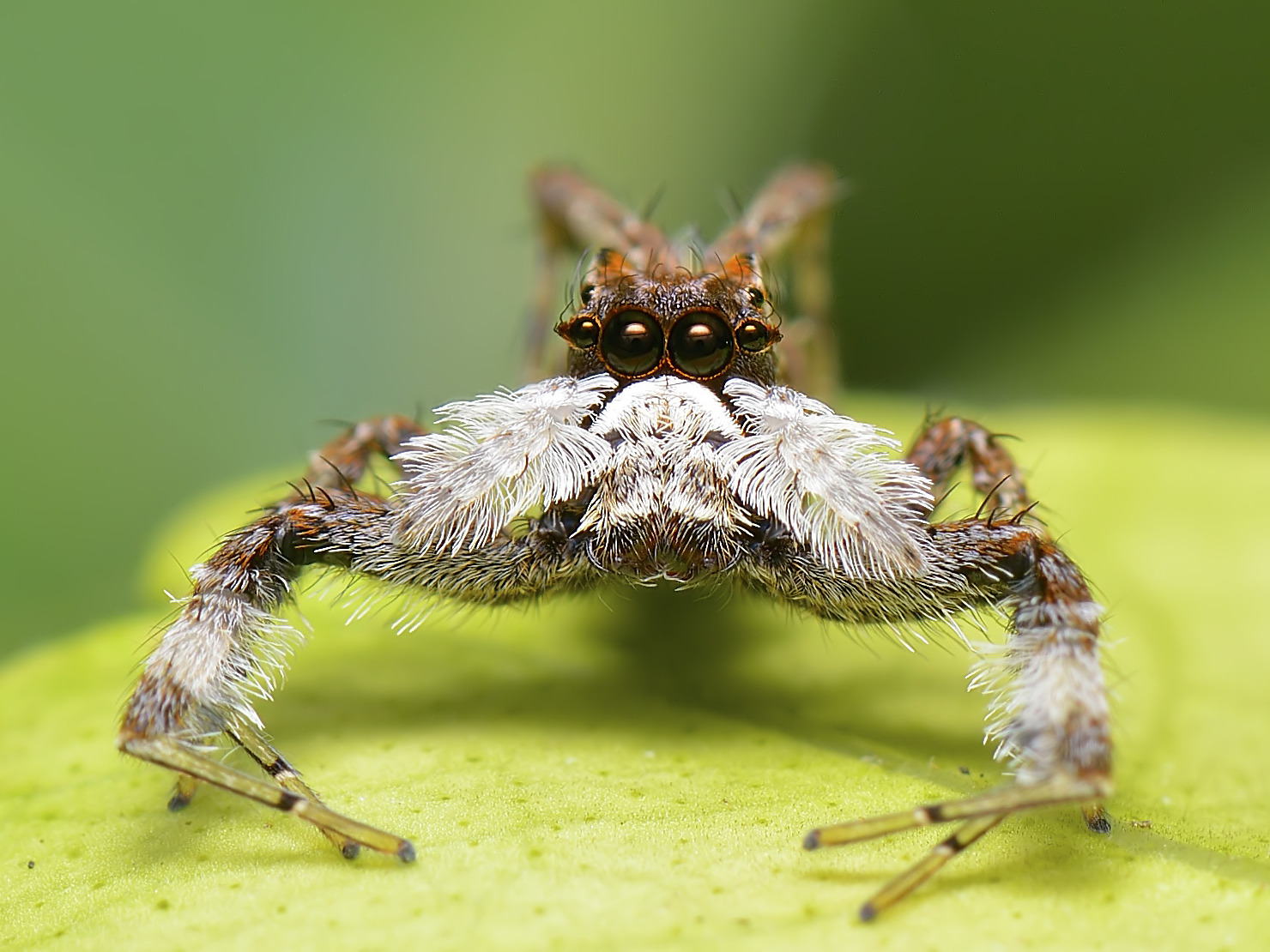
- P. labiata from India

Scientific classification
- Kingdom: Animalia
- Phylum: Arthropoda
- Subphylum: Chelicerata
- Class: Arachnida
- Order: Araneae
- Infraorder: Araneomorphae
- Family: Salticidae
- Genus: Portia
- Species: P. labiata

Binomial name
- Portia labiata (Thorell, 1887)

Synonyms
- Erasinus labiatus (Thorell, 1887); Linus dentipalpis Thorell, 1890; Linus labiatus Thorell, 1887; Portia dentipalpis (Thorell, 1890)

= Portia labiata =

Species of spider

Portia labiata is a jumping spider (family Salticidae) found in Sri Lanka, India, southern China, Burma (Myanmar), Malaysia, Singapore, Java, Sumatra and the Philippines. In this medium-sized jumping spider, the front part is orange-brown and the back part is brownish. The conspicuous main eyes provide vision more acute than a cat's during the day and 10 times more acute than a dragonfly's, and this is essential in P. labiata′s navigation, hunting and mating.

The genus Portia has been called "eight-legged cats", as their hunting tactics are as versatile and adaptable as a lion's. All members of Portia have instinctive hunting tactics for their most common prey, but often can improvise by trial and error against unfamiliar prey or in unfamiliar situations, and then remember the new approach. While most jumping spiders prey mainly on insects and by active hunting, females of Portia also build webs to catch prey directly and sometimes join their own webs on to those of web-based spiders. Both females and males prefer web spiders as prey, followed by other jumping spiders, and finally insects. In all cases females are more effective predators than males.

Populations from Los Baños and from Sagada, both in the Philippines, have slightly different hunting tactics. In laboratory tests, Los Baños P. labiata relies more on trial and error than Sagada P. labiata in finding ways to vibrate the prey's web and thus lure or distract the prey. Around Los Baños the web-building Scytodes pallida, which preys on jumping spiders, is very abundant, and spits a sticky gum on prey and potential threats. A P. labiata from Los Baños instinctively detours round the back of S. pallida while with plucking the web in a way that makes the prey believe the threat is in front of it. In areas where S. pallida is absent, the local members of P. labiata do not use this combination of deception and detouring for a stab in the back. In a test to explore P. labiata′s ability to solve a novel problem, a miniature lagoon was set up, and the spiders had to find the best way to cross it. Specimens from Sagada, in the mountains, almost always repeated the first option they tried, even when that was unsuccessful. When specimens from Los Baños, beside a lake, were unsuccessful the first time, about three quarters switched to another option.

Adults of P. labiata sometimes uses "propulsive displays", in which an individual threatens a rival of the same sex, and unreceptive females also threaten males in this way.^{[c]} P. labiata females are extremely aggressive to other females, trying to invade and take over each other's webs, which often results in cannibalism. A test showed that they minimise the risk of confrontations by using silk draglines as territory marks. Another test showed that females can recognise the draglines of the most powerful fighters and prefer to move near the draglines of less powerful ones. Females try to kill and eat their mates during or after copulation, while males use tactics to survive copulation, but sometimes females outwit them. Before being mature enough to mate, juvenile females mimic adult females to attract males as prey. When hunting, P. labiata mature females emit olfactory signals that reduce the risk that any other females, males or juveniles of the same species may contend for the same prey.

== Body structure and appearance ==
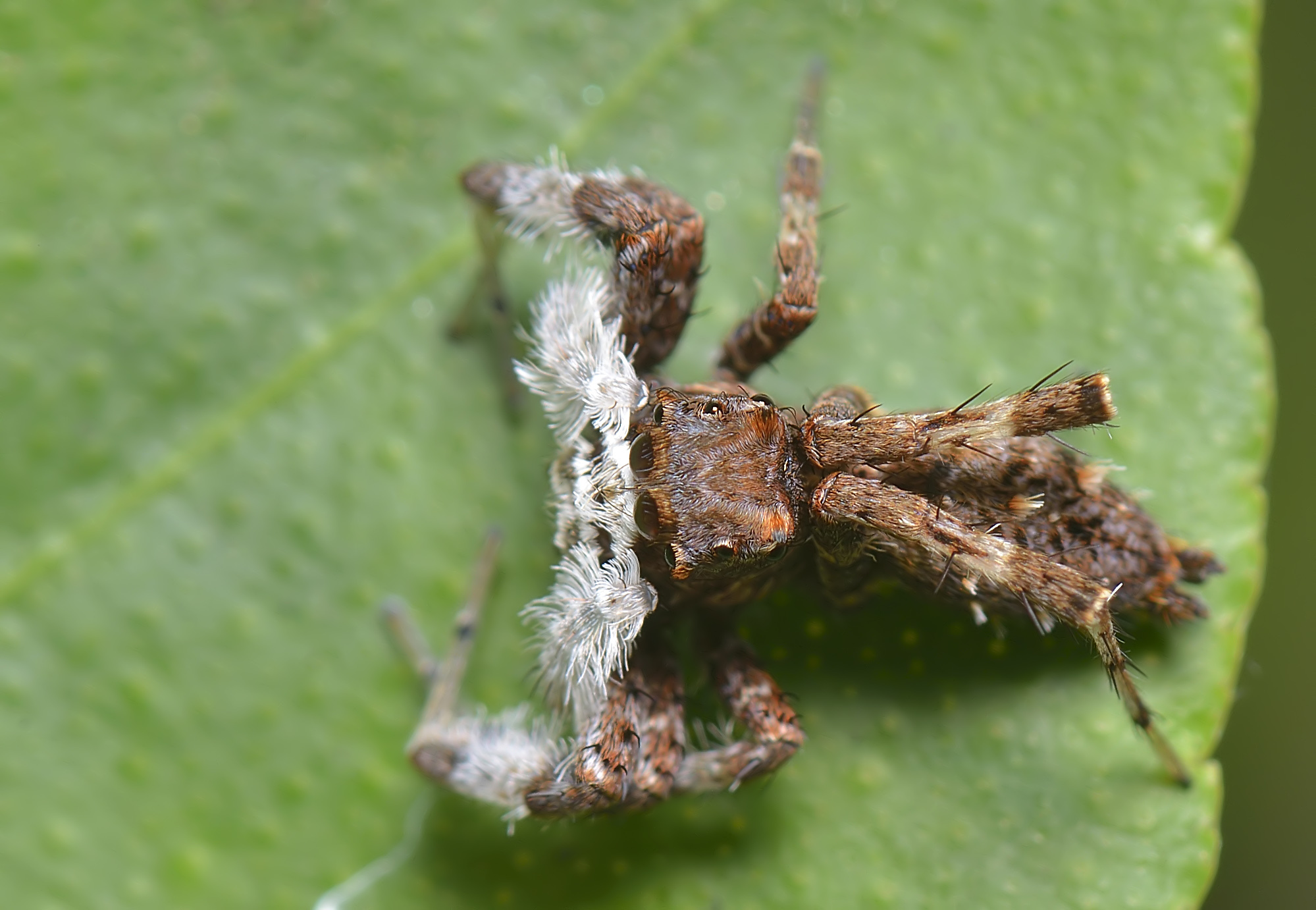
Dorsal view

As in most species of the genus, the bodies of Portia labiata females are 7 to 10 millimetres long and their carapaces are 2.8 to 3.8 millimetres long. Males' bodies are 5 to 7.5 millimetres long, with carapaces 2.4 to 3.3 millimetres long. The carapaces of females are orange-brown, slightly lighter around the eyes, where there are sooty streaks and sometimes a violet to green sheen in certain lights. There is a broad white moustache along the clypeus, and running back from each main eye is a ridge that looks like a horn. Females' chelicerae are dark orange-brown and decorated with white hairs. The abdomens of females are mottled brown and black, and bear hairs of gold, white and black, and there are tufts consisting of brown hairs tipped with white. The carapaces of males are orange-brown, slightly lighter around the eyes, and have brown-black hairs lying on the surface but with a white wedge-shape stripe from the highest point down to the back, and white bands just above the legs. Males' chelicerae are also orange-brown with brown-black markings. The abdomens of males are brown with lighter markings and with brown-black hairs lying on the surface, and a short band of white hairs. The legs of both sexes are dark brown, with light markings in the femora (the sections of the legs nearest the body). All species of the genus Portia have elastic abdomens, so that those of both sexes can become almost spherical when well fed, and females' can stretch as much when producing eggs.

== Senses ==
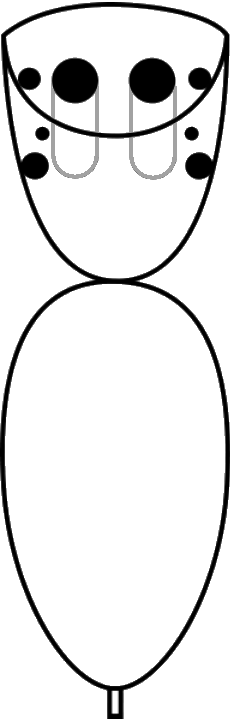
"Squared-off" cephalothorax and eye pattern of jumping spiders

Although other spiders can also jump, salticids including Portia fimbriata have significantly better vision than other spiders, and their main eyes are more acute in daylight than a cat's and 10 times more acute than a dragonfly's. Jumping spiders have eight eyes, the two large ones in the center-and-front position (the anterior-median eyes, also called "principal eyes") housed in tubes in the head and providing acute vision. The other six are secondary eyes, positioned along the sides of the carapace and acting mainly as movement detectors. In most jumping spiders, the middle pair of secondary eyes are very small and have no known function, but those of Portia species are relatively large, and function as well as those of the other secondary eyes. The main eyes focus accurately on an object at distances from approximately 2 centimetres to infinity, and in practice can see up to about 75 centimetres. Like all jumping spiders, P. labiata can take in only a small visual field at one time, as the most acute part of a main eye can see all of a circle up to 12 millimetres wide at 20 centimetres away, or up to 18 millimetres wide at 30 centimetres away.^{[a]} Jumping spider's main eyes can see from red to ultraviolet.

Generally the jumping spider subfamily Spartaeinae, which includes the genus Portia, cannot discriminate objects at such long distances as the members of subfamilies Salticinae or Lyssomaninae can. However, members of Portia have vision about as acute as the best of the jumping spiders, for example: the salticine Mogrus neglectus can distinguish prey and conspecifics up to 320 millimetres away (42 times its own body length), while P. fimbriata can distinguish these up to 280 millimetres (47 times its own body length). The main eyes of a Portia can also identify features of the scenery up to 85 times its own body length, which helps the spider to find detours.

However, a Portia takes a relatively long time to see objects, possibly because getting a good image out of such tiny eyes is a complex process and needs a lot of scanning.^{[e]} This makes a Portia vulnerable to much larger predators such as birds, frogs and mantises, which a Portia often cannot identify because of the other predator's size.

Spiders, like other arthropods, have sensors, often modified setae (bristles), for smell, taste, touch and vibration protruding through their cuticle ("skin"). Unlike insects, spiders and other chelicerates do not have antennae. A Portia can sense vibrations from surfaces, and use these for mating and for hunting other spiders in total darkness. It can use air- and surface "smells" to detect prey which it often meets, to identify members of the same species, to recognise familiar members, and to determine the sex of other member of the same species.

== Hunting tactics ==
=== Tactics used by most jumping spiders and by most of genus Portia ===
Almost all jumping spiders are predators,^{[b]} mostly preying on insects, on other spiders, and on other arthropods. The most common procedure is sighting the prey, stalking, fastening a silk safety line to the surface, using the two pairs of back legs to jump on the victim, and finally biting the prey. Most jumping spiders walk throughout the day, so that they maximize their chances of a catch.

Members of the genus Portia have hunting tactics as versatile and adaptable as a lion's. All members of Portia have instinctive tactics for their most common prey, but can improvise by trial and error against unfamiliar prey or in unfamiliar situations, and then remember the new approach. They can also make detours to find the best attack angle against dangerous prey, even when the best detour takes a Portia out of visual contact with the prey, and sometimes the planned route leads to abseiling down a silk thread and biting the prey from behind. Such detours may take up to an hour, and a Portia usually picks the best route even if it needs to walk past an incorrect route. If a Portia makes a mistake while hunting another spider, it may itself be killed.

While most jumping spiders prey mainly on insects and by active hunting, females of Portia also build webs to catch prey directly. These capture webs are funnel-shaped and widest at the top and are about 4,000 cubic centimetres in volume. The web is initially built in about 2 hours, and then gradually made stronger. A Portia often joins her own web on to one of a web-based non-salticid spider. When not joined to another spiders', a P. labiata female's capture web may be suspended from rigid foundations such as boughs and rocks, or from pliant bases such as stems of shrubs.

A web spider's web is an extension of the web spider's senses, informing the spider of vibrations that signal the arrival of prey and predators. If the intruder is another web spider, these vibrations vary widely depending on the new web spider's species, sex and experience. A Portia can pluck another spider's web with a virtually unlimited range of signals, either to lure the prey out into the open or calming the prey by monotonously repeating the same signal while the Portia walks slowly close enough to bite it. Such tactics enable Portia species to take web spiders, such as Holocnemus pluchei, from 10% to 200% of their size, and they hunt in all types of webs. In contrast, other cursorial spiders generally have difficulty moving on webs, and web-building spiders find it difficult to move in webs unlike those they build: sticky webs adhere to cursorial spiders and to web-builders of non-sticky webs; builders of cribellate webs have difficulty with non-cribellate webs, and vice versa. Where the web is sparse, a Portia will use "rotary probing", in which it moves a free leg around until it meets a thread. When hunting in another spider's web, a Portia′s slow, choppy movement and the flaps on its legs make it resemble leaf detritus caught in the web and blown in a breeze. P. labiata and some other Portia species use breezes and other disturbances as "smokescreens" in which these predators can approach web spiders more quickly, and revert to a more cautious approach when the disturbance disappears. A few web spiders run far away when they sense the un-rhythmical gait of a Portia entering the web – a reaction Wilcox and Jackson call "Portia panic".

If a large insect is struggling in a web, Portia does not usually take the insect, but waits for up to a day until the insect stops struggling, even if the prey is thoroughly stuck. When an insect stuck in a web owned by P. labiata, P. schultzi or any regional variant of P. fimbriata, and next to a web spider's web, the web spider sometimes enters the Portia′s web, and the Portia pursues and catches the web spider.

When catching an insect outside a web, a Portia sometimes lunges and sometimes uses a "pick up", in which it moves its fangs slowly into contact with the prey. In some pick ups, Portia first slowly uses its forelegs to manipulate the prey before biting. P. labiata and P. schultzi also occasionally jump on an insect. However, Portia species are not very good at catching moving insects and often ignore them, while some other salticid genera, especially the quick, agile Brettus and Cyrba, perform well against small insects.

When a Portia stalks another jumping spider, the prey generally faces the Portia and then either runs away or displays as it does to another member of its own species.^{[d]}

The webs of spiders on which Portia species prey sometimes contain dead insects and other arthropods which are uneaten or partly eaten. P. labiata and some other Portia species such as P. fimbriata (in Queensland) and P. schultzi sometimes scavenge these corpses if the corpses are not obviously decayed.

A Portia typically takes 3 to 5 minutes to pursue prey, but some pursuits can take much longer, and in extreme cases close to 10 hours when pursuing a web-based spider.

All Portia species eat eggs of other spiders, including eggs of their own species and of other cursorial spiders, and can extract eggs from cases ranging from the flimsy ones of Pholcus to the tough papery ones of Philoponella. While only P. fimbriata (in Queensland) captures cursorial spiders in their nests, all Portia species steal eggs from empty nests of cursorial spiders.

The venom of Portia species is unusually powerful against spiders. When a Portia stabs a small to medium spider (up to the Portia′s weight), including another Portia, the prey usually runs away for about 100 to 200 millimetres, enters convulsions, becomes paralysed after 10 to 30 seconds, and continues convulsing for 10 seconds to 4 minutes. Portia slowly approaches the prey and takes it. Portia usually needs to inflict up to 15 stabbings to completely immobilise a larger spider(1.5 to 2 times to the Portia′s weight), and then Portia may wait about 20 to 200 millimetres away for 15 to 30 minutes from seizing the prey. Insects are usually not immobilised so quickly but continue to struggle, sometimes for several minutes. If Portia cannot make further contact, all types of prey usually recover, making sluggish movements several minutes after the stabbing but often starting normal movement only after an hour.

Spiders have a narrow gut that can only cope with liquid food, and have two sets of filters to keep solids out. Some spiders pump digestive enzymes from the midgut into the prey and then suck the liquified tissues of the prey into the gut, eventually leaving behind the empty husk of the prey. Others grind the prey to pulp using the fangs and the bases of the pedipalps, while flooding it with enzymes; in these species the fangs and the bases of the pedipalps form a preoral cavity that holds the food they are processing.

Occasionally a Portia is killed or injured while pursuing prey up to twice Portia′s size. P. labiata is killed in 2.1% of pursuits and injured but not killed in 3.9%, P. schultzi is killed in 1.7% and injured but not killed in 5.3%, and P. fimbriata in Queensland is killed in 0.06% of its pursuits and injured but not killed in another 0.06%. A Portia′s especially tough skin often prevents injury, even when its body is caught in the other spider's fangs. When injured, Portia bleeds and may lose one or more legs. Spiders' palps and legs break off easily when attacked, 'the palps and legs of Portia species break off exceptionally easily, which may be a defence mechanism, and they are often seen with missing legs or palps, while other salticids in the same habitat are not seen with missing legs or palps.

=== Tactics used by Portia labiata ===
All performance statistics summarise result of tests in a laboratory, using captive specimens. The following table shows the hunting performance of adult females. In addition to P. labiata, the table shows for comparison the hunting performances of P. africana, P. schultzi and three regional variants of P. fimbriata.

Differences in hunting tactics of females
Prey	Performance	P. labiata	P. africana	P. schultzi	P. fimbriata (Q)	P. fimbriata (NT)	P. fimbriata (SL)
Salticid	Tendency to pursue prey	63%	77%	58%	87%	50%	94%
Salticid	Efficiency in capturing prey	40%	29%	36%	93%	10%	45%
Web-building spider	Tendency to pursue prey	83%	74%	84%	91%	94%	64%
Web-building spider	Efficiency in capturing prey	79%	65%	72%	92%	81%	83%
Insect	Tendency to pursue prey	35%	48%	52%	27%	30%	43%
Insect	Efficiency in capturing prey	71%	67%	69%	41%	83%	78%

Notes on this table:

- "Tendency to pursue prey" is the percentage of tests in which the subject pursues the potential prey, and a pursuit starts when the Portia either approaches the prey or shakes the prey's web.
- "Efficiency in capturing prey" is the percentage of pursuits in which the subject captures the prey.
- P. labiata specimens from Sri Lanka were used in this analysis.
- "(Q)", "(NT)" and "(SL)" identify P. fimbriata from Queensland, Northern Territory and Sri Lanka.
- The prey used was: unspecified jumping spiders; amaurobiid and theridiid web-based spiders; and houseflies.

A female P. labiata often hangs a capture web from pliant stems and leaves of shrubs and lower branches of trees, rather than from rocks and tree trunks. Males of Portia do not build capture webs.

A female P. labiata more often pursues small jumping spiders and web spiders than larger prey. While it more often catches small jumping spiders than larger ones, it is about equally effective with all sizes of web spiders up to twice P. labiata′s size. A female P. labiata is effective against insects up to twice P. labiata′s size when the insect is stuck in a non-salticid's web, and against insects not in webs and up to P. labiata′s size, while P. labiata seldom pursues or catches a larger insect in the open. A female P. labiata very seldom pursues or catches a larger insect in her own web, and is slightly less effective against smaller insects in P. labiata′s web than in other situations. Males are less efficient in all cases.

A test in 1997 showed that P. labiata from the Philippines and from Sri Lanka have similar preferences for different types of prey, and that the order of preference is: web spiders; jumping spiders; and insects. These preferences apply to both live prey and motionless lures, and to P. labiata specimens without prey for 7 days ("well-fed") and without prey for 14 days ("starved"). P. labiata specimens without prey for 21 days ("extra-starved") showed no preference for different types of prey. The test included as prey several species of web spiders and jumping spiders, and the selection of the prey species showed no evidence of affecting the results. Insects were represented by the house fly Musca domestica.

Unlike the Queensland variant of P. frimbriata, P. labiata has no special tactics when hunting other jumping spiders.

P. labiata does not prey on ants, but is preyed on by the ants Oecophylla smaragdina and Odontomachus sp. (species uncertain).

P. labiata will sometimes approach a translucent nest containing another spider, and will usually wait facing the prey for up to several hours. Occasionally P. labiata leaps at the prey in the nest, but this is ineffective.

Populations from Los Baños and from Sagada, both in the Philippines, have slightly different hunting tactics, and Los Baños has some very dangerous prey spiders. In laboratory tests, Los Baños P. labiata relies more on trial and error than Sagada P. labiata in finding ways to vibrate the prey's web and thus lure or distract the prey. Around Los Baños the web-building Scytodes pallida, which preys on jumping spiders, is very abundant. All members of the genus Scytodes spit a sticky gum on prey and potential threats, and this can immobilise a Portia long enough for the Scytodes to wrap the Portia in silk and then bite it. Around Los Baños, P. labiata instinctively detours round the back of S. pallida that is not carrying eggs while with plucking the web in a way that makes S. pallida believe the threat is in front of it. P. labiata prefers to stalk a female S. pallida carrying eggs, as then S. pallida is reluctant to drop the eggs in order to spit, and in this case P. labiata sometimes uses a direct attack. In areas where S. pallida is absent, the local members of P. labiata do not use this combination of plucking other spiders' webs to deceive the prey and detouring for a stab in the back.

A test in 2001 showed that four jumping species take nectar, either by sucking it from the surface of flowers or biting the flowers with their fangs. The spiders fed in cycles of two to four minutes, then groomed, especially their chelicerae, before another cycle. A more formal part of the test showed that 90 juvenile jumping spiders, including P. labiata, generally prefer to suck from blotting soaked with a 30% solution of sugar in water rather than paper soaked with pure water. The authors suggest that, in the wild, nectar may be a frequent, convenient way to get some nutrients, as it would avoid the work, risks and costs (such as making venom). Jumping spiders can benefit from amino acids, lipids, vitamins and minerals normally found in nectar.

The spiders were divided into four groups:
- Rewarded only, if:
  - Jumped and then swam
  - Swam without jumping
- Penalised only, if:
  - Jumped and then swam
  - Swam without jumping

A test in a deliberately artificial environment explored P. labiata′s ability to solve a novel problem by trial and error. A little island was set up in the middle of a miniature atoll, and the space between with them was filled with water. The gap was too wide for the spiders to jump all the way, and the spiders' options were to leap and then swim or to swim only. The testers encouraged some specimens by using a small scoop to make waves toward the atoll when the spiders chose the option the testers preferred (leap and then swim for some spiders, and swim only for others), and discouraged some specimens by making waves back toward the island when the spiders chose the option the testers did not want – in other words, the testers "rewarded" one group for "successful" behaviour and "penalised" the other group for "unwanted" behaviour. Specimens from Sagada almost always repeated the first option they tried, even when that was unsuccessful. When specimens from Los Baños were unsuccessful the first time, about three quarters switched to the other option, irrespective of whether the first attempt was by leaping and then swimming or by swimming only.

== Reproduction and lifecycle ==
Before courtship, a male Portia spins a small web between boughs or twigs, and he hangs under that and ejaculates on to it. He then soaks the semen into reservoirs on his pedipalps, which are larger than those of females.

Females of many spider species, including P. labiata, emit volatile pheromones into the air, and these generally attract males from a distance. The silk draglines of female jumping spiders also contain pheromones, which stimulate males to court females and may give information about each female's status, for example whether the female is juvenile, subadult or mature. Pheromones may help to find jumping spiders' nests, which are usually hidden under rocks or in rolled leaves, making them difficult to be seen.

Portia species sometimes use "propulsive displays", with which a member threatens a rival of the same species and sex, and unreceptive females also threaten males in this way. A propulsive display is a series of sudden, quick movements including striking, charging, ramming and leaps.

A laboratory test showed how males of P. labiata minimise the risk of meeting each other, by recognising fresh pieces with blotting paper, some containing their own silk draglines and some containing another male's. Males also were attracted by fresh blotting paper containing females' draglines, while females do not response to fresh blotting paper containing males' draglines. This suggested that the males usually search for females, rather than vice versa. Neither sex responded to one week-old blotting paper, irrespective of whether it contained males' or females' draglines. A similar series of tests showed that P. fimbriata from Queensland showed the same patterns of responses between the sexes.

Among P. labiata and some other Portia species, when adults of the same species but opposite sexes recognise each other, they display at 10 to 30 centimetres. Males usually wait for 2 to 15 minutes before starting a display, but sometimes a female starts a display first.

A female P. labiata that sees a male may approach slowly or wait. The male then walks with erect and displaying by waving his legs and palps. If the female does not run away, she gives a propulsive display first. If the male stands his ground and she does not ran away or repeat the propulsive display, he approaches and, if she is mature, they copulate. If the female is sub-adult (one moult from maturity), a male may cohabit in the female's capture web. Portia species usually mate on a web or on a dragline made by the female. P. labiata typically copulates for about 100 seconds, while other genera can take several minutes or even several hours.

Females of P. labiata and P. schultzi try to kill and eat their mates during or after copulation, by twisting and lunging. The males wait until the females have hunched their legs, making this attack less likely. Males also try to abseil from a silk thread to approach from above, but females may manoeuvre to get the higher position. If the female moves at all, the male leaps and runs away.

Before being mature enough to mate, females of P. labiata and also P. schultzi mimic adult females to attract males as prey.

P. labiata females are extremely aggressive to other females, trying to invade and take over each other's webs, which often results in cannibalism. A laboratory test showed how they minimise the risk of meeting each other, by recognising pieces with blotting paper containing their own silk draglines and pieces contain other P. labiata females' draglines. If obstacles make it impossible to see whether the other is physically present, she avoids blotting paper containing the other's draglines, but moves with no constraint if she can see that the other female is not around. Draglines seem to act as territory marks, much as many mammals identify conspecifics by scent marking. P. labiata females also avoid rival females of higher fighting ability and spend more time around less powerful fighters. A laboratory test collected samples of the draglines of equal-sized females and then pitted some of them in contests. Other females avoided the draglines of the victors, and spent the majority of their time on draglines of the losers. Similar tests showed that females of P. fimbriata from Australia and P. schultzi from Kenya do not avoid draglines of a powerful fighter.

In P. labiata and in some other species, contests between males usually last only 5 to 10 seconds, and only their legs make contact. Contests between Portia females are violent and embraces in P. labiata typically take 20 to 60 seconds. These occasionally include grappling that sometimes breaks a leg, but more usually one female lunges at the other. Sometimes one knocks the other on her back and the other may be killed and eaten if she does not right herself quickly and run away. If the loser has a nest, the winner takes over and eats any eggs there.

When hunting, mature females of P. labiata, P. africana, P. fimbriata and P. schultzi emit olfactory signals that reduce the risk that any other females, males or juveniles of the same species may contend for the same prey. The effect inhibits aggressive mimicry against a prey spider even if the prey spider is visible, and also if the prey is inhabiting any part of a web. If a female of one of these Portia species smells a male of the same species, the female stimulates the males to court. These Portia species do not show this behaviour when they receive olfactory signals from members of other Portia species.

P. labiata usually lays eggs on dead, brown leaves about 20 millimetres long, suspended near the top of its capture web, and then covers the eggs with a sheet of silk. If there is no dead leaf available, the female will make a small horizontal silk platform in the capture web, lay the eggs on it, and then cover the eggs.

Portia females have never been seen eating their own eggs, but in nature females with eggs of their own have been seen eating eggs of other females of the same species. In a test, P. labiata females did not eat their eggs if the testers put them in other female's nests, showing that the test females could identify their own eggs, possibly by chemical means. When the test females and their eggs were restored to their own nests and other females' eggs were also placed in the same nest, the test females ate neither their own eggs nor the "foreign" ones. In nature a female is unlikely to find foreign eggs in her nest, and it might be safest for females to avoid any eggs in their own nests.

For moulting, all species of Portia spin a horizontal web whose diameter is about twice the spider's body length and is suspended only 1 to 4 millimetres below a leaf. The spider lies head down, and often slides down 20 to 30 millimetres during moulting. Portia species spin a similar temporary web for resting.

== Taxonomy ==
P. labiata is one of 17 species in the genus Portia as of May 2011. This species has been named Sinis fimbriatus (Hasselt, 1882; misidentification), Linus labiatus (Thorell, 1887), Linus dentipalpis (Thorell, 1890), Erasinus dentipalpis (Thorell, 1892), Erasinus labiatus (Simon, 1903) and Portia labiata (Wanless, 1978), and the last name has been used since then.

Portia is in the subfamily Spartaeinae, which is thought to be primitive. Molecular phylogeny, a technique that compares the DNA of organisms to reconstruct the tree of life, indicates that Portia is a member of the clade Spartaeinae, that Spartaeinae is basal (quite similar to the ancestors of all jumping spiders), that Portia′s closest relative is the genus Spartaeus, and that the next closest are Phaeacius and Holcolaetis.

== Ecology ==
P. labiata is found in Sri Lanka, India, southern China, Burma (Myanmar), Malaysia, Singapore, Java, Sumatra and the Philippines.

The populations of P. labiata in Los Baños and in Sagada, both in the Philippines, have different environments: Los Baños is a low-lying tropical rainforest where there are many species of spiders, some of which are especially dangerous to P. labiata; and Sagada is at higher altitude, with pine-forest and fewer species of spiders, none of which are as dangerous to P. labiata. The Los Baños variant has a slightly wider repertoire of tactics.

In the Philippines, P. labiata does not prey on ants, but is preyed on by the ants Oecophylla smaragdina and Odontomachus sp. (species uncertain), and a solitary Odontomachus has been seen attacking a P. labiata. In a test the ant Diacamma vagans usually killed single-handed a P. labiata.

== In popular culture ==
P. labiata features prominently in the science fiction novel Children of Time by Adrian Tchaikovsky.

== Notes ==
a: Jackson and Blest (1982) say, "The resolution of the receptor mosaic of Layer I in the central retina was estimated to be a visual angle of 2.4 arc min, corresponding to 0–12 mm at 20 cm in front of the spider, or 0–18 mm at 30 cm."

b: Several species of cursorial spiders drink nectar as an occasional supplement their diet, and juveniles of some orb-web spiders digest pollen while re-cycling their webs. One jumping spider (as of 2010), Bagheera kiplingi, is almost totally herbivorous.

c: "Propulsive displays" are sudden, quick movements including striking, charging, ramming and leaps.

d: Except that the Queensland variant of Portia fimbriata generally uses a "cryptic stalking" technique which makes most salticids unaware of this predator.

e: The retina is at the end of a tube. The inner end of the tube moves from side to side in one to two cycles per second, and twists 50° in a cycle that takes 10 seconds.
