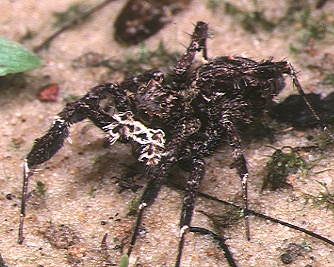
- Female P. fimbriata

Scientific classification
- Kingdom: Animalia
- Phylum: Arthropoda
- Subphylum: Chelicerata
- Class: Arachnida
- Order: Araneae
- Infraorder: Araneomorphae
- Family: Salticidae
- Genus: Portia
- Species: P. fimbriata

Binomial name
- Portia fimbriata (Doleschall, 1859)

Synonyms
- Salticus fimbriatus Doleschall, 1859; Sinis fimbriatus (Doleschall, 1859); Linus fimbriatus (Doleschall, 1859); Linus alticeps Pocock, 1899; Boethoportia ocellata Hogg, 1915

= Portia fimbriata =

Species of spider

Portia fimbriata, sometimes called the fringed jumping spider, is a jumping spider (family Salticidae) found in Australia and Southeast Asia. Adult females have bodies 6.8 to 10.5 millimetres long, while those of adult males are 5.2 to 6.5 millimetres long. Both sexes have a generally dark brown carapace, reddish brown chelicerae ("fangs"), a brown underside, dark brown palps with white hairs, and dark brown abdomens with white spots on the upper side. Both sexes have fine, faint markings and soft fringes of hair, and the legs are spindly and fringed. However, specimens from New Guinea and Indonesia have orange-brown carapaces and yellowish abdomens. In all species of the genus Portia, the abdomen distends when the spider is well fed or producing eggs.

The hunting tactics of Portia are versatile and adaptable. All members of Portia have instinctive hunting tactics for their most common prey, but can improvise by trial and error against unfamiliar prey or in unfamiliar situations, and then remember the new approach. There are differences in the hunting tactics of the regional populations of P. fimbriata. Those in Australia's Northern Territory are poor at hunting jumping spiders and better against non-salticid web-building spiders and against insects. The Sri Lanka variant is fair against other jumping spiders, and good against web spiders and insects. P. fimbriata in Queensland is an outstanding predator of other jumping spiders and of web spiders, but poor against insects. The Queensland variant use a unique "cryptic stalking" technique which prevents most jumping spider prey from identifying this P. fimbriata as a predator, or even as an animal at all. Some jumping spider prey have partial defences against the cryptic stalking technique. All types of prey spiders occasionally counter-attack, but all Portia species have very good defences, starting with especially tough skin.

When meeting another of the same species, P. fimbriata does not use cryptic stalking but displays by moving quickly and smoothly. In P. fimbriata from Queensland, contests between males usually are very brief and do no damage. Contests between Portia females are usually long and violent, and the victor may evict a loser and then eat the loser's eggs – but victorious females of P. fimbriata from Queensland do not kill and eat the losing female. If a P. fimbriata male from Queensland displays to a female, she may run away or she may charge at him.^{[c]} If the pair reach agreement after this, they will copulate if she is mature, and if she is sub-adult he will cohabit in her nest until she finishes moulting, and then they copulate. P. fimbriata typically copulates much quicker than other jumping spiders. Unlike in other Portia species, females of P. fimbriata do not eat their mates during courting, nor during or after copulation.

== Body structure and appearance ==
Females of the jumping spider Portia fimbriata have bodies 6.8 to 10.5 millimetres long, while those of adult males are 5.2 to 6.5 millimetres long. The Queensland variety is typically smaller than the Northern Territory variety. The cephalothorax is about 4 millimetres long and 3 millimetres wide, and the abdomen about 4 millimetres long and 2.2 millimetres wide. The front of the cephalothorax is large and angular, and the face is broad, high and flat. In Australia and Taiwan, both sexes have a generally dark brown carapace, reddish brown chelicerae ("jaws"), a brown underside, and dark brown palps with white hairs. Both sexes also have fine, faint markings and soft fringes of hair. The female has two white stripes that form an M on the cephalothorax: these stripes start at the level of the pedipalps, pass between the lateral and median anterior eyes, go up to the tufts of the cephalothorax and meet just above the pair of principal eyes. The back half of the male's cephalothorax has a white strip round the bottom edge and a white groove down the back. While male spiders' palps are larger than females', the palps of P. fimbriata females have a fringe of hair that makes them look about as large as males'. The abdomens of both sexes are dark brown, with white spots on the upper side. Wanless' female from New Guinea has an orange carapace and chelicerae with sooty markings, palps mainly light yellow, legs orange-brown, and abdomen light yellow. Wanless also found a male from the Amboina area in Indonesia, showing an orange-brown carapace and chelicerae, yellow-brown to orange-brown palps, orange-brown legs and a light yellowish abdomen.

== Movement ==
When not hunting for prey or a mate, Portia species adopt a special posture, called the "cryptic rest posture", pulling their legs in close to the body and their palps back beside the chelicerae ("jaws"), which obscures the outlines of these appendages. When walking, all Portia species have a slow, "choppy" gait that preserves their concealment: pausing often and at irregular intervals; waving their legs continuously and their palps jerkily up and down; and moving each appendage out of time with the others and continuously varying the speed and timing. Portia′s walk is unlike that of any other spider, and this gait and the spider's fringes gives the appearance of light flickering through the forest canopy and reflecting from a piece of detritus. In Queensland, P. fimbriata walks and waves more jerkily and about twice as slowly as other Portia species, including P. fimbriata in other areas.

If disturbed, most Portia species leap upwards about 100 to 150 millimetres, often from the cryptic rest pose, and often over a wide trajectory. Usually Portia then either freezes or runs about 100 millimetres and then freezes. However, P. fimbriata in Queensland rarely runs or leaps.

== Senses ==
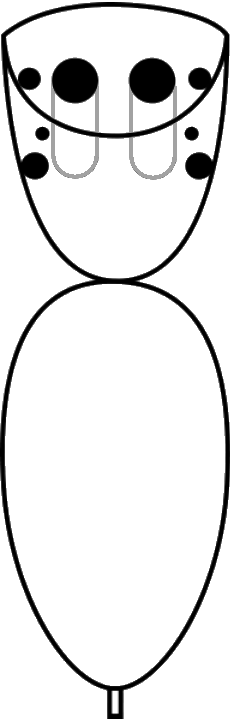
"Squared-off" cephalothorax and eye pattern of jumping spiders

Although other spiders can also jump, salticids including Portia fimbriata have significantly better vision than other spiders, and their main eyes are more acute in daylight than a cat's and 10 times more acute than a dragonfly's. Jumping spiders have eight eyes, the two large ones in the center-and-front position (the anterior-median eyes, also called "principal eyes") housed in tubes in the cephalothorax and providing acute vision. The other six are secondary eyes, positioned along the sides of the carapace and acting mainly as movement detectors. In most jumping spiders, the middle pair of secondary eyes are very small and have no known function, but those of Portia species are relatively large, and function as well as its other secondary eyes. The main eyes focus accurately on an object at distances from approximately 2 centimetres to infinity, and in practice can see up to about 75 centimetres. Like all jumping spiders, P. fimbriata can take in only a small visual field at one time, as the most acute part of a main eye can see all of a circle up to 12 millimeters wide at 20 centimeters away, or up to 18 millimeters wide at 30 centimeters away.^{[a]}

Generally the jumping spider subfamily Spartaeinae, which includes the genus Portia, cannot discriminate objects at such long distances as the members of subfamilies Salticinae or Lyssomaninae can. However, the main eyes of Portia have vision about as acute as the best of the jumping spiders: the salticine Mogrus neglectus can distinguish prey and conspecifics up to 320 millimetres away (42 times its own body length), while P. fimbriata can distinguish these up to 280 millimetres (47 times its own body length). The main eyes of P. fimbriata can also identify features of the scenery up to 85 times its own body length, which helps the spider to find detours.

However, a Portia takes a relatively long time to see objects, possibly because getting a good image out of such tiny eyes is a complex process and needs a lot of scanning.^{[d]} This makes a Portia vulnerable to much larger predators such as birds, frogs and mantises, which a Portia often cannot identify because of the other predator's size.

Spiders, like other arthropods, have sensors, often modified setae (bristles), for smell, taste, touch and vibration, protruding through their cuticle ("skin"). A Portia can sense vibrations from surfaces, and use these for mating and for hunting other spiders in total darkness. It can use air- and surface "smells" to detect prey which it often meets, to identify members of the same species, to recognise familiar members, and to determine the sex of other member of the same species.

== Hunting and feeding ==
=== Hunting tactics of the genus Portia ===
Members of the genus Portia have been called "eight-legged cats", as their hunting tactics are as versatile and adaptable as a lion's. All members of Portia have instinctive tactics for their most common prey, but can improvise by trial and error against unfamiliar prey or in unfamiliar situations, and then remember the new approach. They can also make detours to find the best attack angle against dangerous prey, even when the best detour takes a Portia out of visual contact with the prey, and sometimes the planned route leads to abseiling down a silk thread and biting the prey from behind. Such detours may take up to an hour, and a Portia usually picks the best route even if it needs to walk past an incorrect route.

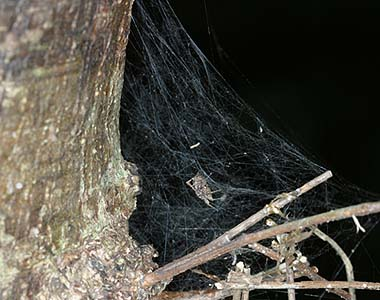
Female P. fimbriata in its web

While most jumping spiders prey mainly on insects and by active hunting, females of Portia also build webs to catch prey directly. These "capture webs" are funnel-shaped and widest at the top and are about 4,000 cubic centimetres in volume. A Portia often builds her own web on to one of a web-based non-salticid spider. When not joined to another spiders', a P. fimbriata female's capture web is generally suspended from rigid foundations such as boughs and rocks. Males of Portia do not build capture webs.

A Portia can pluck another spider's web with a virtually unlimited range of signals, either to lure the prey out into the open or calming the prey by monotonously repeating the same signal while the Portia walks slowly close enough to bite it. Such tactics enable Portia species to take web spiders, such as Holocnemus pluchei from 10% to 200% of a Portia′s size, and Portia species hunt in all types of webs. In contrast, other cursorial spiders generally have difficulty moving on webs, and web-building spiders find it difficult to move in webs unlike those they build. When hunting in another spider's web, a Portia′s slow, choppy movements and the flaps on its legs make it resemble leaf detritus caught in the web and blown in a breeze. P. fimbriata and some other Portia species use breezes and other disturbances as "smokescreens" in which these predators can approach web spiders more quickly, and revert to a more cautious approach when the disturbance disappears. A few web spiders run far away when they sense the un-rhythmical gait of a Portia entering the web – a reaction Wilcox and Jackson call "Portia panic".

If a large insect is struggling in a web, Portia usually waits for up to a day until the insect stops struggling, even if the prey is thoroughly stuck. When an insect is stuck in a web owned by P. labiata, P. schultzi or any regional variant of P. fimbriata, and next to a web spider's web, the web spider sometimes enters the Portia′s web, and the Portia pursues and catches the web spider.

The webs of spiders on which Portia species prey sometimes contain dead insects and other arthropods which are uneaten or partly eaten. P. fimbriata (in Queensland) and some other Portia species such as P. labiata and P. schultzi sometimes scavenge these corpses if the corpses are not obviously decayed.

When using its own web to catch other species of salticids, P. fimbriata conceals its conspicuous palps, which it does not do when stalking a web-spider or occasionally a moving fly.

All Portia species eat eggs of other spiders, including eggs of their own species and of other cursorial spiders, and can extract eggs from cases ranging from the flimsy ones of Pholcus to the tough papery ones of Philoponella. While only P. fimbriata (in Queensland) captures cursorial spiders in their nests, all Portia species steal eggs from empty nests of cursorial spiders.

The venom of Portia is unusually powerful against spiders. When a Portia stabs a small to medium spider (up to the Portia′s weight), including another Portia, the prey usually runs away for about 100 to 200 millimetres, enters convulsions, becomes paralysed after 10 to 30 seconds, and continues convulsing for 10 seconds to 4 minutes. Portia slowly approaches the prey and takes it. Portia usually needs to inflict up to 15 stabbings to completely immobilise a larger spider (1.5 to 2 times to the Portia′s weight), and then Portia may wait about 20 to 200 millimetres away for 15 to 30 minutes from seizing the prey. Insects are usually not immobilised so quickly but continue to struggle, sometimes for several minutes.

Occasionally a Portia is killed or injured while pursuing prey up to twice Portia′s size. In tests, Portia labiata is killed in 2.1% of pursuits and injured but not killed in 3.9%, while P. schultzi is killed in 1.7% and injured but not killed in 5.3%. In Queensland, P. fimbriata is killed in 0.06% of its pursuits and injured but not killed in another 0.06%. A Portia′s especially tough skin often prevents injury, even when its body is caught in the other spider's fangs. When injured, Portia bleeds and may sometimes lose one or more legs. Spiders' palps and legs break off easily when attacked, Portia′s palps and legs break off exceptionally easily, which may be a defence mechanism, and Portia species are often seen with missing legs or palps, while other salticids in the same habitat are not seen with missing legs or palps. A P. fimbriata specimen, now in the Australian Museum collection, regenerated a lost limb about 7 days after moulting.

=== Hunting tactics of P. fimbriata ===
All performance statistics summarise result of tests in a laboratory, using captive specimens. Female P. fimbriatas' tactics and performance show regional differences between the populations in Queensland, the Northern Territory and Sri Lanka. The table also includes females of P. africana around Lake Victoria, of P. schultzi elsewhere in Kenya and of P. labiata in Sri Lanka for comparison.

Regional differences in hunting tactics of females
Prey	Performance	P. fimbriata (Q)	P. fimbriata (NT)	P. fimbriata (SL)	P. africana	P. labiata	P. schultzi
Salticid	Tendency to pursue prey	87%	50%	94%	77%	63%	58%
Salticid	Efficiency in capturing prey	93%	10%	45%	29%	40%	36%
Web-building spider	Tendency to pursue prey	91%	94%	64%	74%	83%	84%
Web-building spider	Efficiency in capturing prey	92%	81%	83%	65%	79%	72%
Insect	Tendency to pursue prey	27%	30%	43%	48%	35%	52%
Insect	Efficiency in capturing prey	41%	83%	78%	67%	71%	69%
Notes on this table: "Tendency to pursue prey" is the percentage of tests in which the subject pursues the potential prey, and a pursuit starts when the Portia either approaches the prey or shakes the prey's web.; "Efficiency in capturing prey" is the percentage of pursuits in which the subject captures the prey.; "(Q)", "(NT)" and "(SL)" identify P. fimbriatas from Queensland, Northern Territory and Sri Lanka.; The prey used were: unspecified jumping spiders; amaurobiid and theridiid web-based spiders; and houseflies.

P. fimbriata in all regions fix their own webs to solid surfaces such as rocks and tree trunks and boughs, while some other Portia species often fix their webs to pliant stems and leaves and on the lower branches of trees.

A test in 2001 showed that four jumping species take nectar, either by sucking free nectar from the surface of flowers or biting the flowers with their fangs. The spiders fed in cycles of two to four minutes, then groomed their bodies and especially their chelicerae, before another cycle. A more formal part of the test showed that 90 juvenile jumping spiders, including P. fimbriata, generally prefer to suck from blotting soaked with a 30% solution of sugar rather than paper soaked with distilled water. The authors suggest that, in the wild, nectar may be a frequent, convenient way to get some nutrients, as it would avoid the work, risks and costs (such as making venom) of predation. Jumping spiders may benefit from amino acids, lipids, vitamins and minerals normally found in nectar.

==== Tactics in Queensland ====
Portia fimbriata from Queensland is the most thoroughly studied araneophagic (spider-eating) salticid. Robinson (2010) said that the Queensland P. fimbriata has the most varied prey capture techniques of any animal in the world except humans and other simians. When not using its own web, the Queensland P. fimbriata preys mainly on salticids of other genera, generally using against them a special tactic called "cryptic stalking".

Differences in females' tactics between P. fimbriata (Queensland) and other Portia species
	P. fimbriata (Q)	Other Portia species
Light levels	Lower	Higher
Abundance of local web spiders	Higher	Lower
Preying on web spiders	More efficient More likely to vibrate the web Less likely to leap	Less efficient Less likely to vibrate the web More likely to leap
Abundance of local salticids	Higher	Lower
Preying on cursorial salticids	More efficient Uses cryptic stalking Usually swoops	Less efficient No use of cryptic stalking Never swoops
Pursuing and catching insects	Less efficient	More efficient
Slow, mechanical walking	Exaggerated	Less pronounced
When mildly disturbed	Adopts cryptic pose	Makes wild leaps
While mating	Courtship uses less vibrations Female seldom twists to lunge and eat the male	Courtship uses more vibrations Female twists and lunges and often eats the male
Notes on this table: In a swoop, P. fimbriata in Queensland slowly moves its cephalothorax above the prey, and then quickly drives down with its fangs open. This type of attack is not used by other Portia species, including P. fimbriata from Northern Territory and Sri Lanka.; Other Portia species, including P. fimbriata outside Queensland, occasionally use isolated aspects of cryptic stalking, such as briefly keeping the palps down or being still for a moment when very close to prey.

Adult males are less ready to pursue and less efficient at catching than adult females, especially against larger prey. Males are quite effective against small web spiders, and reluctant to tackle large ones although they catch them in about 50% of attempts. Against other jumping spiders, males do not pursue large ones and pursue about 48% of small ones, catching 84% of those they pursue. Males of Portia do not build large webs for catching prey ("capture webs").

A test in 1997 showed that P. fimbriata′s preferences for different types of prey are in the order: web spiders; jumping spiders; and insects. These preferences apply to both live prey and motionless lures, and to P. fimbriata specimens without prey for 7 days ("well-fed") and without prey for 14 days ("starved"). P. fimbriata specimens without prey for 21 days ("extra-starved") showed no preference for different types of prey. The test included as prey several species of web spiders and jumping spiders, and the selection of the prey species showed no evidence of affecting the results. Insects were represented by the house fly Musca domestica.

Differences in females' pursuit times between P. fimbriata (Queensland) and other Portia species
Prey		P. fimbriata (Q)	Other Portia species
Salticid	Median	26 min	3 min
Salticid	Range	1 to 318 min	0 to 41 min
Web spider	Median	16 min	5 min
Web spider	Range	0 to 583 min	0 to 465 min
Insect	Median	3 min	3 min
Insect	Range	0 to 34 min	0 to 45 min

When hunting most other salticids in Queensland, P. fimbriata exaggerates the slowness and "choppiness" of its normal gait (sometimes called "robotlike") and holds its palps retracted beside its fangs, as it also does in the cryptic rest pose. If the salticid prey faces P. fimbriata, P. fimbriata freezes until the prey turns away. This "cryptic stalking" appears unique to Queensland, where most other jumping spiders fail to recognize a disguised stalking P. fimbriata as a predator, or even as an animal at all. P. fimbriata from Queensland uses cryptic stalking against both salticids native to Queensland and against imported salticids. Other salticids often defend themselves when stalked by other species of Portia or by P. fimbriata outside Queensland, and the Queensland P. fimbriata′s cryptic stalking may be a regional adaptation to the abundant but dangerous salticid prey, especially Jacksonoides queenslandicus, in the local rainforest. P. fimbriata uses cryptic stalking even against some oddly-shaped salticids such as the flattened Holoplatys and the elongated, mantis-like Mantisatta longicauda. All of P. fimbriata′s salticid prey have a pair of large, forward-facing principal eyes, a feature that arachnologists also use to distinguish salticids from all other spiders.

Euryattus, another jumping spider from Queensland, has a partly overlapping range with P. fimbriata′s and is abundant in their common range, and adult and large juvenile P. fimbriatas hunt Euryattus adopting specific tactics. Unlike most jumping spiders, Euryattus makes a nest by suspending a dead rolled-up leaf by silk lines from vegetation. P. fimbriata catches Euryattus females by mimicking the vibrations made by Euryattus males as part of their courtship, and this deception lures Euryattus females out of their nests. In tests, a Euryattus from P. fimbriata′s range recognises the predator and defends itself, while Euryattus specimens from outside P. fimbriata′s range seldom recognise the threat. P. fimbriata finds it easier to catch a Euryattus from outside the predator's home range than to capture the same species from P. fimbriata′s range. This may be an example of an evolutionary arms race.

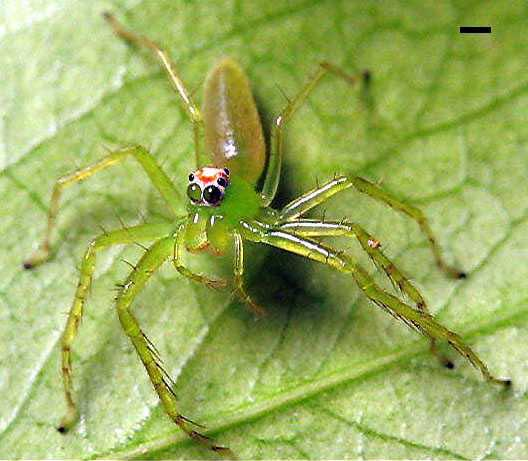
A female Lyssomanes viridis (not the species in Queensland)

P. fimbriata does not stalk at all species of the ant-mimic jumping spider genus Myrmarachne, and uses cryptic stalking only about 20% of the time against other ant-mimicking salticids and against beetle-mimicking salticids. P. fimbriata also sometimes does not use cryptic stalking against females of the salticid subfamily Lyssomaninae. These females are unusually translucent, and the translucent cuticle makes the anterior-median eyes (front-and-center) show light and dark regions that flicker in and out when viewed head on. Lyssomanine males are not translucent and do not produce this flickering, and P. fimbriata uses cryptic stalking consistently against the males. This suggests that the flickering anterior-median eyes of lyssomanine females may reduce the ability of P. fimbriata to identify these females as jumping spiders.

When encountering J. queenslandicus, P. fimbriata often first notices chemical cues on J. queenslandicus′ silken safety lines and then looks for its prey. The smell helps P. fimbriata see its prey more quickly, possibly by lowering thresholds in the visual system. Sometimes P. fimbriata cannot see J. queenslandicus through the prey's camouflage, and "hunts by speculation", jumping high in the air, so that J. queenslandicus betrays itself by turning and looking for the disturbance. P. fimbriata then turns toward J. queenslandicus and waves its palps. It appears that only P. fimbriatas from Queensland behaves this way while Portia species from other areas did not, that P. fimbriata from Queensland reacts this way only to J. queenslandicus, and that J. queenslandicus perceives no chemical warnings that P. fimbriata is around.

When stalking any non-salticid, P. fimbriata does not use cryptic stalking and does not consistently pull its palps back nor consistently freeze when faced by the prey. P. fimbriata adopts cryptic stalking only after recognizing prey as a jumping spider.

In Queensland, P. fimbriata is reluctant to jump into the webs of prey spiders, while other Portia species do this at any opportunity. The Queensland orb web spider Argiope shakes its web violently to shake off intruders, and P. fimbriata finds a detour that allows it to abseil on to the prey. When the web spider Zosis genicularis is busy wrapping up its own prey and is less aware of other predators, P. fimbriata uses this activity as a type of smokescreen to approach the web spider.

P. fimbriata uses non-cryptic stalking against lycosid, clubionid, theridiid and desid spiders, and against flies, but does not stalk beetles or ants.

Unlike other Portia species, P. fimbriata in Queensland readily invades the nests of cursorial spiders, plucking or cutting the nest. If the resident spider eventually leaves the nest, P. fimbriata stalks it. If the resident spider tries to counterattack and then retreats into the nest, P. fimbriata may attack the other spider as it re-enters the nest, or may wait motionless until the prey exits. If a stabbed prey spider retreats into the nest, P. fimbriata in Queensland never enters the nest, but waits for the prey to move out, and then P. fimbriata kills it.

The spiders were divided into those that:

- Jump and then swim
  - Rewarded only
  - Penalised only
- Swim only
  - Rewarded only
  - Penalised only

A test in a deliberately artificial environment explored the Queensland P. fimbriata′s ability to solve a novel problem by trial and error. A little island was set up in the middle of a miniature atoll, and the space between with them was filled with water. The gap was too wide for the spiders to jump all the way, and the spiders' options were to leap and then swim or to swim only. The testers encouraged some specimens by using a tiny scoop to make waves toward the atoll when the spiders chose the option the testers preferred (leap and then swim, or swim only), and discouraged some specimens by making waves back toward the island when the spiders chose the option the testers did not want – in other words, the testers "rewarded" one group for "successful" behaviour and "penalised" the other group for "unwanted" behaviour. The Queensland P. fimbriata specimens generally repeated successful behaviour and switched if the first try was unsuccessful, irrespective of which option (leap and then swim or to swim only) the testers chose as "good" for each specimen.

==== Tactics in Northern Territory ====
In the Northern Territory, P. fimbriata has no special tactics against other jumping spiders and treats them as if they were web spiders. It either tries to jump on them or gives up, so this variant is poor at catching other jumping spiders. The Northern Territory variant of P. fimbriata is not as good as the Queensland variant at catching web spiders, but better than the Sri Lanka variant and some other species of Portia. It is not enthusiastic about pursuing insects, but is very good at catching those it pursues, as the performance table above shows. While pursuits by the Queensland variant typically take 26 minutes, those of the Northern Territory variant typically take 3 to 5 minutes, like some other species of Portia.

==== Tactics in Sri Lanka ====
The Sri Lanka variant enthusiastically pursues other jumping spiders and is slightly better than most Portia species in tests, but about half as effective as the Queensland variant. In Sri Lanka, P. fimbriata is not a prolific hunter of web spiders or insects, but it quite efficiently catches those it pursues. Like other Portia species, the Sri Lanka P. fimbriata typically take 3 to 5 minutes for a pursuit.

== Reproduction and lifecycle ==
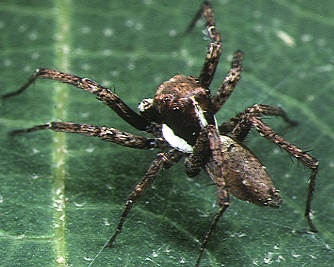
Male of P. fimbriata

Before courtship, a male Portia spins a small web between boughs or twigs, and he hangs under that and ejaculates on to it. He then takes up the semen into reservoirs in the palpal bulbs on his pedipalps.

A laboratory test showed how males of P. fimbriata from Queensland minimise the risk of meeting each other, by recognising fresh pieces of blotting paper, some containing their own silk draglines and some containing another male's draglines. Males also were attracted by fresh blotting paper containing females' draglines, while females do not respond to fresh blotting paper containing males' draglines. This suggested that the males usually search for females, rather than vice versa. Neither sex responded to one week-old blotting paper, irrespective of whether it contained males' or females' draglines. A similar series of tests showed that P. labiata showed the same patterns of responses between the sexes.

When meeting another of the same species, P. fimbriata does not stalk but displays by moving quickly and smoothly, and displays at 4 to 27 centimetres away. It raises its legs, its body sways from side to side, and the palps are lowered below the chelicerae ("fangs"). This is very different from the stalking it uses when encountering another salticid of a different species, despite receiving the same visual stimulus, the sight of the other's large anterior-median eyes. Although P. fimbriata is influenced by pheromones much more than is usual among salticids, visual cues alone are enough to start displays and distinguish members of the same species from other salticids, even if neither partner moves. The spindly, fringed legs of Portia species may identify members of the same species, as well as concealing these spiders from other salticid species.

In P. fimbriata from Queensland and in some other species, contests between males usually last only 5 to 10 seconds, and only their legs make contact. Contests between Portia females are usually long and violent, and in P. fimbriata from Queensland these often including grappling that sometimes breaks a leg. A victor may evict a loser, and then eat the loser's eggs and take over the loser's web. Unlike in some other Portia species, victorious females of P. fimbriata from Queensland do not kill and eat the losers.

A female that sees a male may approach slowly or wait. The male then walks erect and displays by waving his legs and palps. If the female does not run away, she gives a "propulsive display"^{[c]} first. If the male stands his ground and she does not run away or repeat the propulsive display, he approaches and, if she is mature, they copulate, the male inserting the tip of one of his palpal bulbs into the female's copulatory opening, using the first palp that made scraping contact. If the female is sub-adult (one moult from maturity), a male or sometimes a sub-adult male of P. fimbriata may cohabit in the female's capture web. Portia species usually mate on a web or on a dragline made by the female. P. fimbriata typically copulates for about 100 seconds, while other genera can take several minutes or even several hours. Unlike in some other Portia species, females of P. fimbriata from Queensland do not eat their mates during courting, nor during or after copulation.

When hunting, mature females of P. fimbriata, P. africana, P. labiata, and P. schultzi emit olfactory signals that reduce the risk that any other females, males or juveniles of the same species may contend for the same prey. The effect inhibits aggressive mimicry against a prey spider even if the prey spider is visible, and also if the prey is inhabiting any part of a web. If a female of one of these Portias smells a male of the same species, the female stimulates the males to court. These Portia species do not show this behaviour when they receive olfactory signals from members of other Portia species.

In laboratory tests, Portia species including P. fimbriata mate with other species, but the females then produce no eggs.

P. fimbriata in Queensland prefers to lay eggs on dead, brown leaves about 20 millimetres long, suspended near the top of its capture web, and then cover the eggs with a sheet of silk. If there is no dead leaf available, the female will make a small horizontal silk platform in the capture web, lay the eggs on it, and then cover the eggs. In Northern Territory, P. fimbriata occasionally lays eggs in a dead leaf, but more usually in a silk egg sac on a small horizontal web suspended on the main web.

Like all arthropods, spiders moult and, after hatching, the life stage before each moult is called an "instar". Specimens of P. fimbriata become mature at instar 7, 8 or 9. In an experiment using P. fimbriata spiderlings from Queensland, 64% of those fed only on spiders survived to maturity, 37% of those fed on a mixture of spiders and insects survived, and all those fed solely on insects died before reaching the 6th instar. For moulting, all Portia species spin a horizontal web whose diameter is about twice the spider's body length and is suspended only 1 to 4 millimetres below a leaf. The spider lies head down, and often slides down 20 to 30 millimetres during moulting. Portia species spin a similar temporary web for resting. P. fimbriata in Queensland can be very sedentary, in some cases remaining in the same web for over 48 days during a series of moults.

== Ecology ==
P. fimbriata is found in the rain forests of India, Nepal, Sri Lanka, Hong Kong, Taiwan, New Guinea, the Solomon Islands, Malaysia including Malacca, Indonesia, and in Australia's Northern Territory and Queensland. It lives on foliage, tree trunks, boulders, and rock walls. Throughout its range, this is the most common species of the genus Portia. Queensland specimens of P. fimbriata live near running water and where there is moderate light, while Northern Territory specimens live in caves where the light varies from rather dark at the back to much brighter around the mouths. Other populations of Portia also live with higher light levels than in Queensland, and some members of these other populations are found in webs exposed to direct sunlight for part of the day. In Queensland, P. fimbriata shares its environment with a common prey, the very abundant Jacksonoides queenslandicus, and with large populations of other non-Portia salticids and non-salticid web-building spiders.

Ants prey on P. fimbriata while P. fimbriata does not stalk ants, regarding them as poisonous or very unpleasant. P. fimbriata is also preyed upon by birds, frogs, and mantises.

It is often difficult to find P. fimbriata in the wild, as its shape and movements are well disguised. The Queensland variety is quite easy to raise, while the Northern Territory variety is quite troublesome to maintain.

== Taxonomy ==
P. fimbriata is one of 17 species in the genus Portia as of May 2016. Wanless divided the genus Portia into two species groups: the schultzi group, in which males' palps have a fixed tibial apophysis; and the kenti group, in which the apophysis of each palp in the males has a joint separated by a membrane. The schultzi group includes P. schultzi, P. africana, P. fimbriata, and P. labiata.

The species P. fimbriata was originally described by Carl Ludwig Doleschall as Salticus fimbriata in 1859. The species has also been named Attus fimbriatus (Doleschall, 1859), Sinis fimbriatus (Doleschall, 1859), Linus fimbriatus (Doleschall, 1859) and Boethoportia ocellata (Hogg, 1915), and Portia fimbriata (Doleschall, 1859), and the last is now used. According to Jackson and Hallas, P. fimbriata, as currently defined, probably includes two or more distinct species. In particular, Queensland P. fimbriata are probably a distinct species from Sri Lankan P. fimbriata, as matings between the two groups are infertile.

Portia is in the subfamily Spartaeinae, which is thought to be primitive. Molecular phylogeny, a technique that compares the DNA of organisms to reconstruct the tree of life, indicates that Portia is a member of the clade Spartaeinae, that Spartaeinae is basal (quite similar to the ancestors of all jumping spiders), and that Portia′s closest relatives are the genera Spartaeus, Phaeacius, and Holcolaetis.

== Notes ==
a: Jackson and Blest (1982) say, "The resolution of the receptor mosaic of Layer I in the central retina was estimated to be a visual angle of 2.4 arc min, corresponding to 0–12 mm at 20 cm in front of the spider, or 0–18 mm at 30 cm."

b: Several species of cursorial spiders drink nectar as an occasional supplement their diet, and juveniles of some orb-web spiders digest pollen while re-cycling their webs. One jumping spider (as of 2010), Bagheera kiplingi, is almost totally herbivorous.

c: "Propulsive displays" are sudden, quick movements including striking, charging, ramming and leaps.

d: The retina is at the end of a tube. The inner end of the tube moves from side to side in one to two cycles per second, and twists 50° in a cycle that takes 10 seconds.
