= Trial and error =

Method of problem-solving

Trial and error is a fundamental method of problem-solving characterized by repeated, varied attempts which are continued until success, or until the practitioner stops trying.

According to W.H. Thorpe, the term was devised by C. Lloyd Morgan (1852–1936) after trying out similar phrases "trial and failure" and "trial and practice". However, the phrase 'trial and error' was already in use in 1833, where it can be found in the book title "Practical Methods by Trial and Error for Finding the Latitude and Time at Sea". Under Morgan's Canon, animal behaviour should be explained in the simplest possible way. Where behavior seems to imply higher mental processes, it might be explained by trial-and-error learning. An example is the skillful way in which his terrier Tony opened the garden gate, easily misunderstood as an insightful act by someone seeing the final behavior. Lloyd Morgan, however, had watched and recorded the series of approximations by which the dog had gradually learned the response, and could demonstrate that no insight was required to explain it.

Edward Lee Thorndike was the initiator of the theory of trial and error learning based on the findings he showed how to manage a trial-and-error experiment in the laboratory. In his famous experiment, a cat was placed in a series of puzzle boxes to study the law of effect in learning. He plotted to learn curves which recorded the timing for each trial. Thorndike's key observation was that learning was promoted by positive results, which was later refined and extended by B. F. Skinner's operant conditioning.

Trial and error is also a method of problem solving, repair, tuning, or obtaining knowledge. In the field of computer science, the method is called generate and test (brute force). In elementary algebra, when solving equations, it is called guess and check.

This approach can be seen as one of the two basic approaches to problem-solving, contrasted with an approach using insight and theory. However, there are intermediate methods that, for example, use theory to guide the method, an approach known as guided empiricism.

This way of thinking has become a mainstay of Karl Popper's critical rationalism.

== Methodology ==
The trial-and-error approach is used most successfully with simple problems and in games, and it is often the last resort when no apparent rule applies. This does not mean that the approach is inherently careless, for an individual can be methodical in manipulating the variables in an attempt to sort through possibilities that could result in success. Nevertheless, this method is often used by people who have little knowledge in the problem area. The trial-and-error approach has been studied from its natural computational point of view

=== Simplest applications ===
Ashby (1960, section 11/5) offers three simple strategies for dealing with the same basic exercise-problem, which have very different efficiencies. Suppose a collection of 1000 on/off switches has to be set to a particular combination by random-based testing, where each test is expected to take one second. [This is also discussed in Traill (1978–2006, section C1.2]. The strategies are:

- the perfectionist all-or-nothing method, with no attempt at holding partial successes. This would be expected to take more than 10^301 seconds, [i.e., 2^1000 seconds, or 3·5×(10^291) centuries]
- a serial test of switches, holding on to the partial successes (assuming that these are manifest), which would take 500 seconds on average
- parallel-but-individual testing of all switches simultaneously, which would take only one second

Note the tacit assumption here that no intelligence or insight is brought to bear on the problem. However, the existence of different available strategies allows us to consider a separate ("superior") domain of processing — a "meta-level" above the mechanics of switch handling — where the various available strategies can be randomly chosen. Once again this is "trial and error", but of a different type.

=== Hierarchies ===
Ashby's book develops this "meta-level" idea and extends it into a whole recursive sequence of levels, successively above each other in a systematic hierarchy. On this basis, he argues that human intelligence emerges from such organization: relying heavily on trial-and-error (at least initially at each new stage), but emerging with what we would call "intelligence" at the end of it all. Thus presumably the topmost level of the hierarchy (at any stage) will still depend on simple trial-and-error.

Traill (1978–2006) suggests that this Ashby hierarchy probably coincides with Piaget's well-known theory of developmental stages. [This work also discusses Ashby's 1000-switch example; see §C1.2]. After all, it is part of Piagetian doctrine that children learn first by actively doing in a more-or-less random way, and then hopefully learn from the consequences, which all has a certain resemblance to Ashby's random "trial-and-error".

=== Application ===
Traill (2008, espec. Table "S" on p.31) follows Jerne and Popper in seeing this strategy as probably underlying all knowledge-gathering systems — at least in their initial phase.

Four such systems are identified:

- Natural selection which "educates" the DNA of the species,
- The brain of the individual (just discussed);
- The "brain" of society-as-such (including the publicly held body of science); and
- The adaptive immune system.

== Features ==
Trial-and-error has a number of features:

- solution-oriented: trial and error does not attempt to discover why a solution works, merely that it is a solution.
- problem-specific: trial and error does not attempt to generalize a solution to other problems.
- non-optimal: trial and error is generally an attempt to find a solution, not all solutions, and not the best solution.
- needs little knowledge: trial and error can proceed where there is little or no knowledge of the subject.

It is possible to use trial and error to find all solutions or the best solution when a testably finite number of possible solutions exists. To find all solutions, one simply makes a note and continues, rather than ending the process when a solution is found, until all solutions have been tried. To find the best solution, one finds all solutions by the method just described and then comparatively evaluates them based upon some predefined set of criteria, the existence of which is a condition for the possibility of finding a best solution. (Also, when only one solution can exist, as in assembling a jigsaw puzzle, then any solution found is the only solution and so is necessarily the best.)

== Examples ==
Trial and error has traditionally been the main method of finding new drugs, such as antibiotics. Chemists simply try chemicals at random until they find one with the desired effect. In a more sophisticated version, chemists select a narrow range of chemicals it is thought to have some effect using a technique called structure–activity relationship. (The latter case can be alternatively considered as a changing of the problem rather than of the solution strategy: instead of "What chemical will work well as an antibiotic?" the problem in the sophisticated approach is "Which, if any, of the chemicals in this narrow range will work well as an antibiotic?") The method is used widely in many disciplines, such as polymer technology to find new polymer types or families.

Trial and error is also commonly seen in player responses to video games - when faced with an obstacle or boss, players often form a number of strategies to surpass the obstacle or defeat the boss, with each strategy being carried out before the player either succeeds or quits the game.

Sports teams also makes use of trial and error to qualify for and/or progress through the playoffs and win the championship, attempting different strategies, plays, lineups and formations in hopes of defeating each opponent along the way to victory. This is especially crucial in playoff series in which multiple wins are required to advance, where a team that loses a game will have the opportunity to try new tactics to find a way to win, if they are not eliminated yet.

The scientific method can be regarded as containing an element of trial and error in its formulation and testing of hypotheses. Also compare genetic algorithms, simulated annealing and reinforcement learning – all varieties for search which apply the basic idea of trial and error.

Biological evolution can be considered as a form of trial and error. Random mutations and sexual genetic variations can be viewed as trials and poor reproductive fitness, or lack of improved fitness, as the error. Thus after a long time 'knowledge' of well-adapted genomes accumulates simply by virtue of them being able to reproduce.

Bogosort, a conceptual sorting algorithm (that is extremely inefficient and impractical), can be viewed as a trial-and-error approach to sorting a list. However, typical simple examples of bogosort do not track which orders of the list have been tried and may try the same order any number of times, which violates one of the basic principles of trial and error. Trial and error is actually more efficient and practical than bogosort; unlike bogosort, it is guaranteed to halt in finite time on a finite list, and might even be a reasonable way to sort extremely short lists under some conditions.

Jumping spiders of the genus Portia use trial and error to find new tactics against unfamiliar prey or in unusual situations, and remember the new tactics. Tests show that Portia fimbriata and Portia labiata can use trial and error in an artificial environment, where the spider's objective is to cross a miniature lagoon that is too wide for a simple jump, and must either jump then swim or only swim.

== See also ==
- Ariadne's thread (logic)
- Brute-force attack
- Brute-force search
- Dictionary attack
- Empiricism
- Genetic algorithm
- Learning curve
- Margin of error
- Regula falsi
