= Dicranorhina =

- Dicranorhina kohli

Scientific classification
- Kingdom: Animalia
- Phylum: Arthropoda
- Clade: Pancrustacea
- Class: Insecta
- Order: Hymenoptera
- Family: Crabronidae
- Subfamily: Crabroninae
- Tribe: Larrini
- Subtribe: Larrina
- Genus: Dicranorhina; Shuckard, 1840

Synonyms
- Piagetia Ritsema, 1872

Genus of insects

Dicranorhina is a genus of solitary, ground-nesting, predaceous wasps, with 18 species. Dicranorhina wasps typically prey on crickets, including species of Ornebius and Cycloptilum (Mogoplistidae) which they use to provision their nests.

== Description ==
These wasps are of medium size (7–12 mm long) and are black with a dark spot on the forewing in the region of the marginal and submarginal cells. The body has no erect hair, and the legs and thorax may be partly reddish. Diagnostic features include a pedunculate gaster, a low, rather thick collar, and weak orbital swellings on the frons. Females have a scoop-like foreleg tarsomere which may be associated with nesting or prey capture activity.

== Species ==
- Dicranorhina cavernicola (van der Vecht, 1937)
- Dicranorhina dinesani Mawadda, Girish Kumar and Sureshan in Mawadda, Girish Kumar, Sureshan and Tessy, 2019
- Dicranorhina fasciatiipennis (Cameron, 1889)
- Dicranorhina georgei Mawadda, Girish Kumar and Sureshan in Mawadda, Girish Kumar, Sureshan and Tessy, 2019
- Dicranorhina huonensis Tsuneki, 1983
- Dicranorhina intaminata (R. Turner, 1910)
- Dicranorhina kohli (Brauns, 1899)
- Dicranorhina nigra (Maidl, 1925)
- Dicranorhina palawanensis Williams, 1928
- Dicranorhina papuana Tsuneki, 1983
- Dicranorhina papuensis Tsuneki, 1983
- Dicranorhina ritsemae (Ritsema, 1872)
- Dicranorhina ruficollis (Cameron, 1904)
- Dicranorhina ruficornis (Cameron, 1889)
- Dicranorhina sreeramani Mawadda, Girish Kumar and Sureshan in Mawadda, Girish Kumar, Sureshan and Tessy, 2019
- Dicranorhina varicornis (Cameron, 1904)
- Dicranorhina woerdeni (Ritsema, 1872)
- Dicranorhina wollastoni R. Turner, 1912
