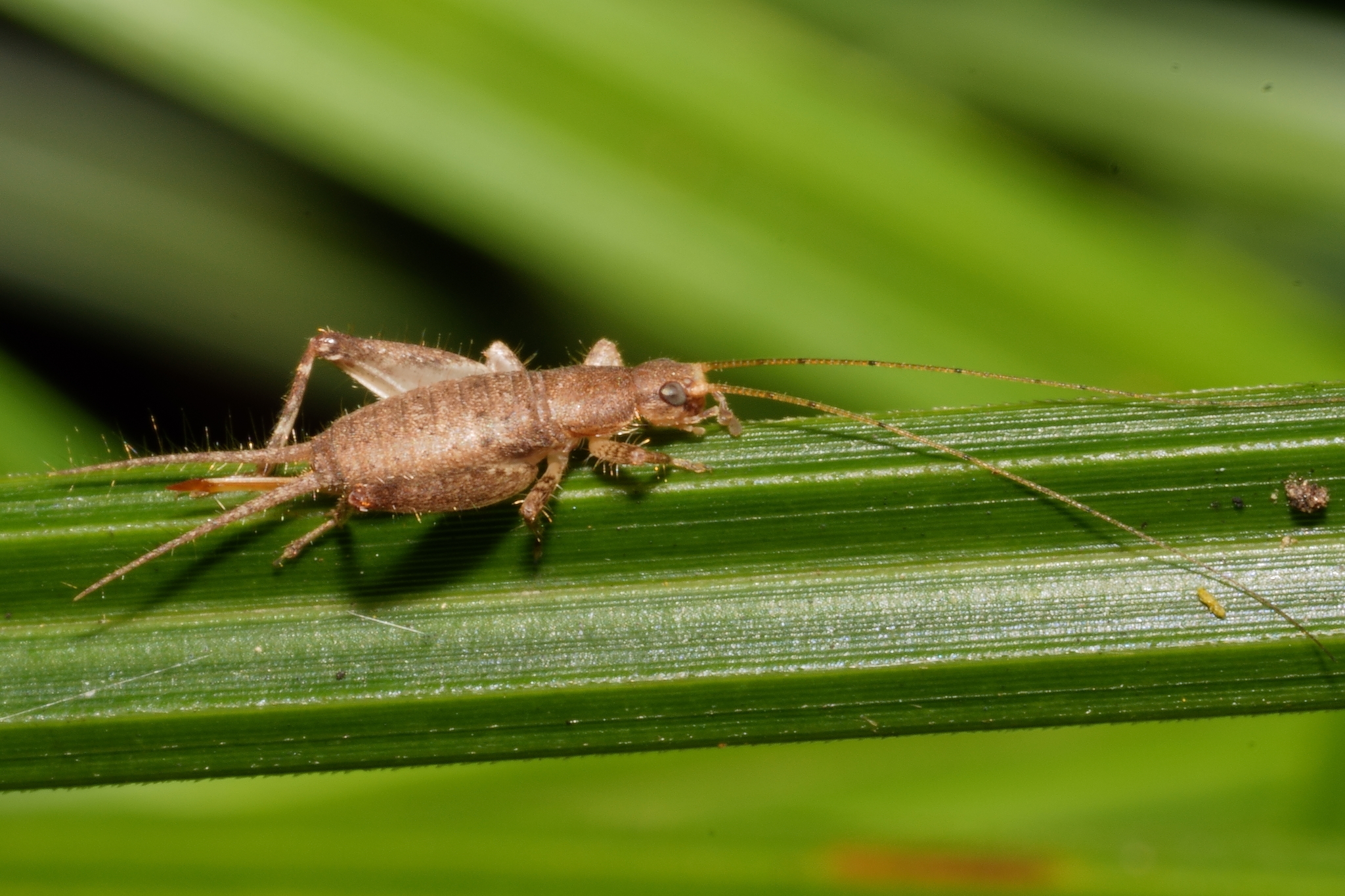

Scientific classification
- Kingdom: Animalia
- Phylum: Arthropoda
- Clade: Pancrustacea
- Class: Insecta
- Order: Orthoptera
- Suborder: Ensifera
- Family: Mogoplistidae
- Subfamily: Mogoplistinae
- Tribe: Arachnocephalini
- Genus: Ornebius
- Species: O. aperta

Binomial name
- Ornebius aperta Otte & Alexander, 1983

= Ornebius aperta =

Species of cricket

Ornebius aperta is a species of apterous cricket in the family Mogoplistidae. Native to southeastern Queensland, Australia, the species became established in New Zealand in the late 20th century.

== Description ==
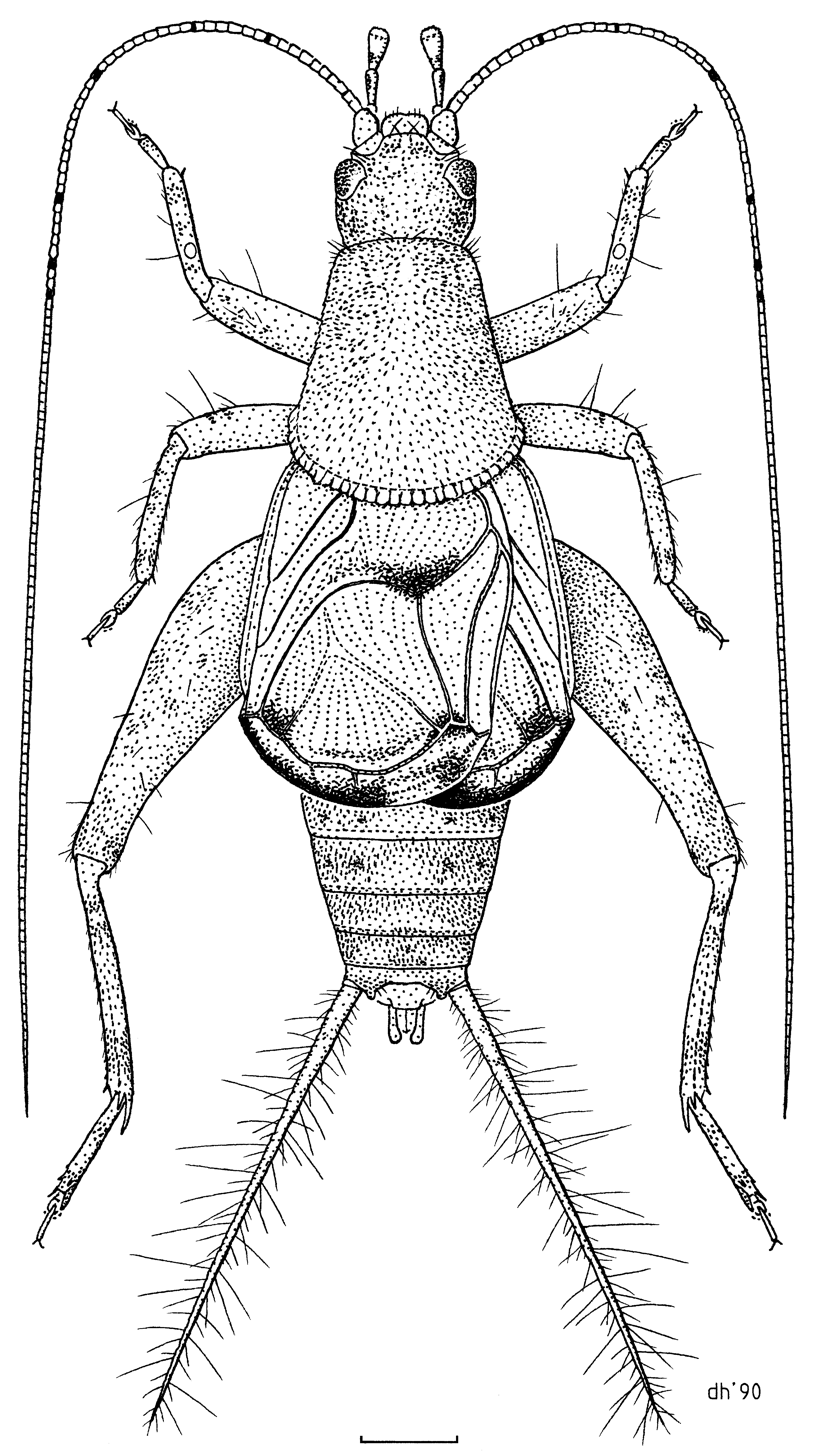
Illustation by Des Helmore

Males of the species have a rusty brown colour. The male paraprocts are pale brown and have a club-like shape.

== Taxonomy ==
The species was first described by Daniel Otte and Richard Dick Alexander in 1983. The species epithet apetra, meaning hill, refers to the species' type locality, Mount Tamborine, Queensland.

A morphologically similar population of Ornebius crickets is known to occur in Northland, New Zealand, which can be differentiated due to differences in song. As of 2024, it is unclear if this population represents a distinct species, or a population of O. aperta.

== Distribution and habitat ==
The species is native to southeastern Queensland, Australia, found in arboreal areas, including underbrush and vines of rainforest areas. By the 1970s, the species had become established in New Zealand, in the Auckland Region, later spreading to the Waikato Region and Taranaki Region. The species has also been introduced to Perth in Western Australia. In New Zealand, the species is commonly found in urban parks and garden hedges.

== Behaviour ==
O. aperta is nocturnal. The species is known for repeated copulation with the same partner, up to over 50 times. While the benefits of this behaviour are unknown, it may be related to insemination success.
