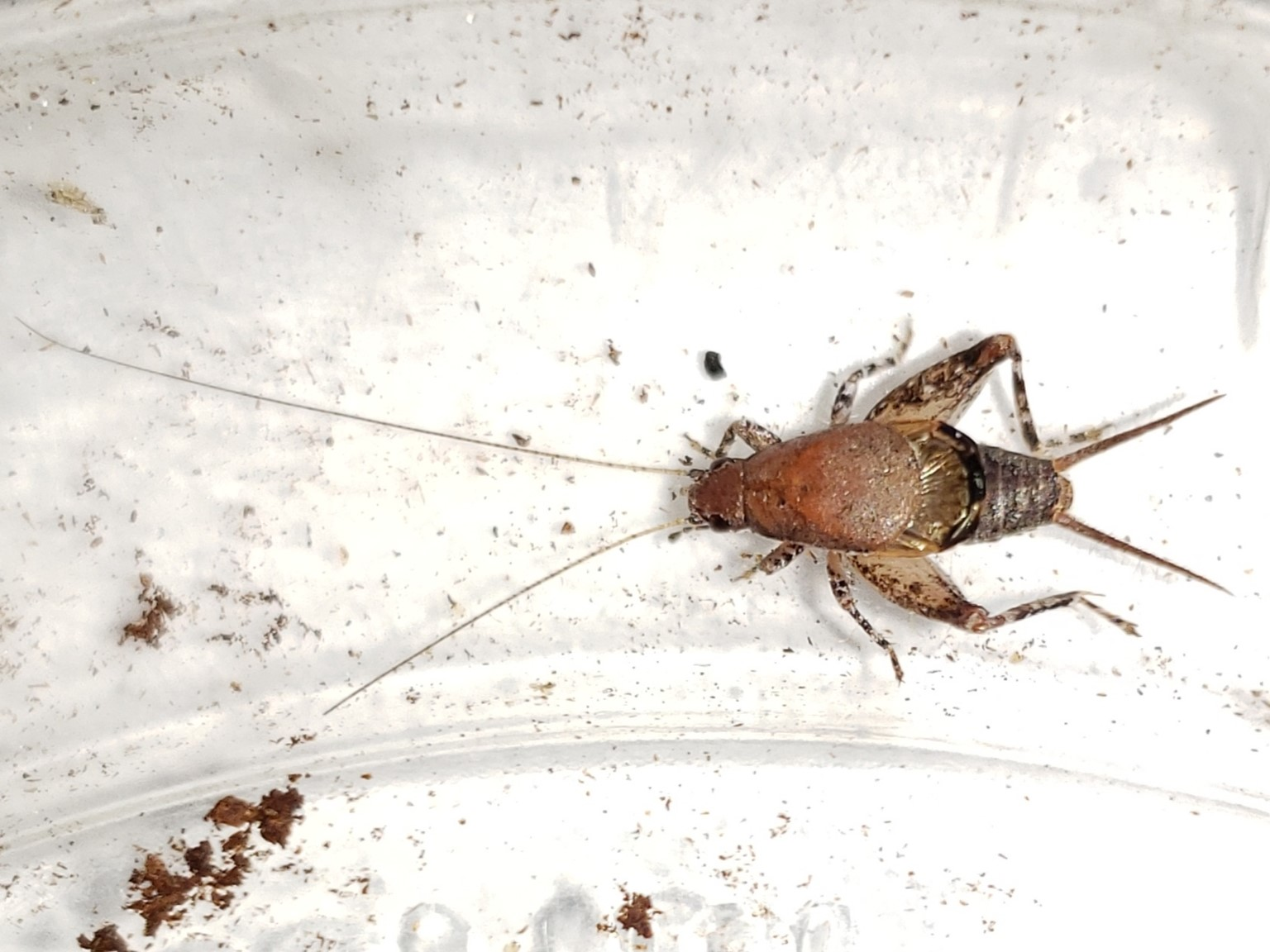

Scientific classification
- Kingdom: Animalia
- Phylum: Arthropoda
- Class: Insecta
- Order: Orthoptera
- Suborder: Ensifera
- Family: Mogoplistidae
- Tribe: Arachnocephalini
- Genus: Cycloptilum
- Species: C. bidens

Binomial name
- Cycloptilum bidens Hebard, 1931

= Cycloptilum bidens =

Species of cricket

Cycloptilum bidens, the two-toothed scaly cricket, is a species of scaly cricket in the family Mogoplistidae. It is found in North America.
