= Paramogoplistes =

Scientific classification
- Domain: Eukaryota
- Kingdom: Animalia
- Phylum: Arthropoda
- Class: Insecta
- Order: Orthoptera
- Suborder: Ensifera
- Family: Mogoplistidae
- Subfamily: Mogoplistinae
- Tribe: Mogoplistini
- Genus: Paramogoplistes; Gorochov, 1984

Genus of crickets

External image
- Images at iNaturalist

Paramogoplistes is a genus of European crickets in the family Mogoplistidae and tribe Mogoplistini, erected by A.V. Gorochov in 1984 as part of the revision of genus Mogoplistes. This genus is recorded from the Iberian Peninsula, Sardinia and South-eastern Europe (to western Turkey).

== Species ==
The Orthoptera Species File lists:

1. Paramogoplistes dentatus Gorochov & Llorente del Moral, 2001
2. Paramogoplistes novaki (Krauss, 1888) - type species (as Mogoplistes novaki Krauss)
3. Paramogoplistes ortini Llucià Pomares, 2015
