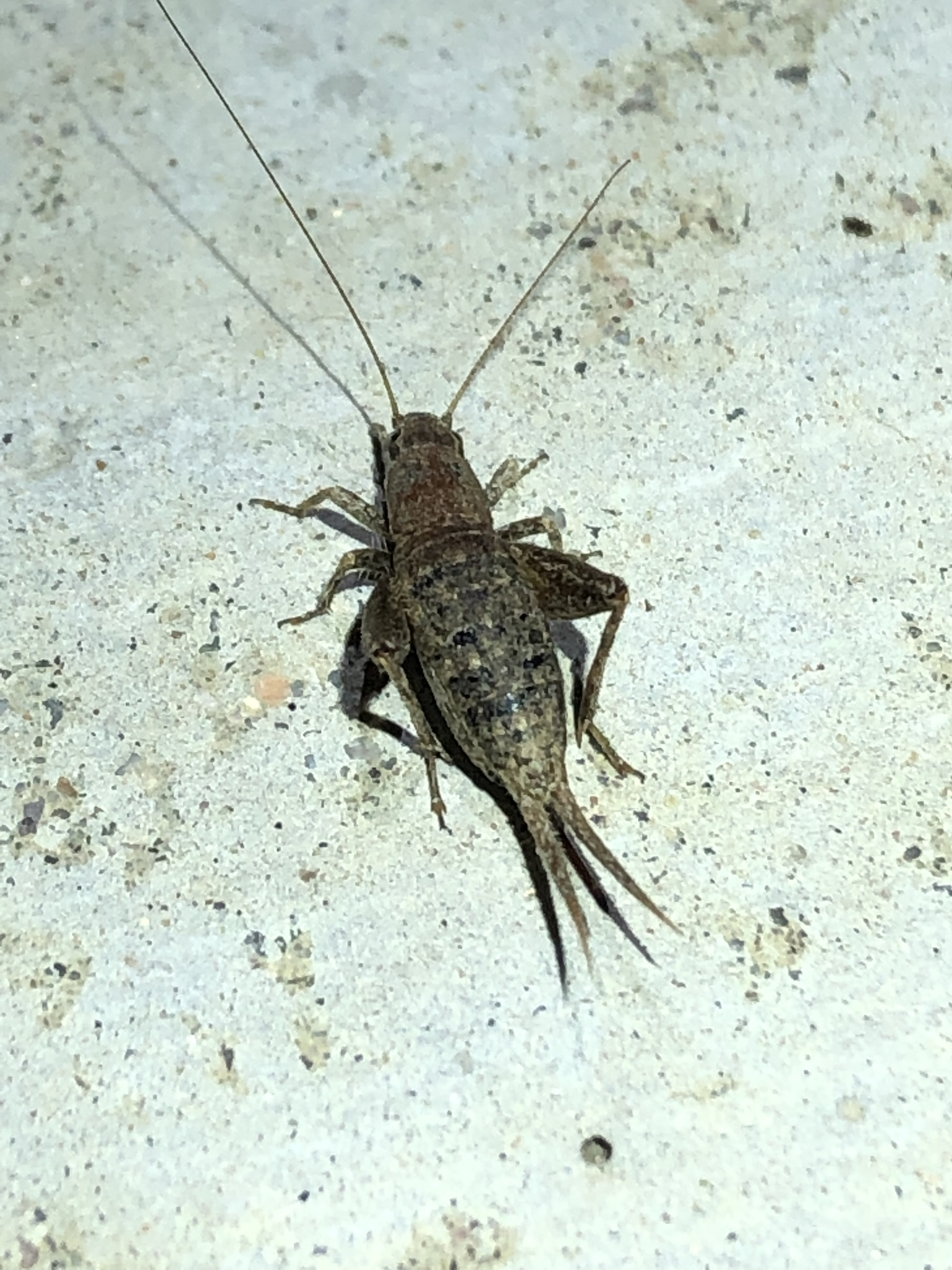
- C. comprehendens fortior

Scientific classification
- Kingdom: Animalia
- Phylum: Arthropoda
- Class: Insecta
- Order: Orthoptera
- Suborder: Ensifera
- Family: Mogoplistidae
- Tribe: Arachnocephalini
- Genus: Cycloptilum
- Species: C. comprehendens

Binomial name
- Cycloptilum comprehendens Hebard, 1929

= Cycloptilum comprehendens =

Species of cricket

Cycloptilum comprehendens, the syncopated scaly cricket, is a species of scaly cricket in the family Mogoplistidae. It is found in North America.

== Subspecies ==
These three subspecies belong to the species Cycloptilum comprehendens:

- Cycloptilum comprehendens comprehendens Hebard, 1929
- Cycloptilum comprehendens fortior Hebard, 1931 (desert syncopated scaly cricket)
- Cycloptilum comprehendens interior Hebard, 1931
