= Portia africana =

Scientific classification
- Kingdom: Animalia
- Phylum: Arthropoda
- Subphylum: Chelicerata
- Class: Arachnida
- Order: Araneae
- Infraorder: Araneomorphae
- Family: Salticidae
- Genus: Portia
- Species: P. africana

Binomial name
- Portia africana (Simon, 1886)

Synonyms
- Linus africana Simon, 1886; Cocalus africana Thorell, 1893; Neccocalus africana Roewer, 1965

Species of spider

Portia africana is a jumping spider (family Salticidae) found in Angola, Cameroon, the Central African Republic, Gabon, Ghana, the Ivory Coast, Sierra Leone, Zaire and Zambia. Its conspicuous main eyes provide vision more acute than a cat's during the day and 10 times more acute than a dragonfly's, and this is essential in P. africana′s navigation, hunting and mating.

Like other species of the genus Portia, P. africana prefers to hunt web-based spiders, jumping spiders and other types in that order. When hunting web-based spiders, Portias use trial and error to find a way to mislead the prey until the Portia is in a position to bite the victim. While other Portias live and hunt as individuals, P. africana forms large populations both in savanna areas and in the dense "cities" which social jumping spiders build in vegetation near the shoreline of lakes. In the savanna, groups of P. africana, generally consisting of small juveniles, delay the prey until one juvenile bites the victim, and sometimes the juvenile shares the food with other. In vegetation near shorelines, P. africana hunts in the social jumping spiders' cities. There, two species of assassin bug prey on P. africana, and one also preys on the other.

Before courtship, males spin a small web between boughs or twigs, that they hang under, ejaculate into, and then soak the semen into reservoirs on their pedipalps. If a female smells a male of the same species, the female stimulates the males to court. While hunting, mature females of P. africana emit olfactory signals that reduce the risk that any other females, males or juveniles of the same species may contend for the same prey.

== Body structure and appearance ==
In 1978 in Sierra Leone, Wanless found adult females 4.8 to 9.6 millimetres in body length and adult males 5.2 to 7.2 millimetres. Both sexes have orange-brown carapaces with light orange round the eyes. The female's carapace has faint sooty markings, and short fine white and light brownish hairs lying over the surface, with a scanty tuft behind the fovea. Males have sparse white tufts on their thorax and irregular white bands above the bases of all but the first pair of legs. Female's chelicerae are orange with blackish markings, decorated with dense white hairs at the top and long light brown hairs near the bottom; while male's chelicerae are orange-brown, with darker markings and a layer of thin fine light brown hair. The abdomen of both sexes is mottled yellow-brown and black, but the female's has tufts of orange-brown to dark brown hairs while the male's is mottled yellow-brown and black, clothed in white, orange-brown and black hairs, with conspicuous orange and cream white tufts. The legs of both sexes have many strong spines, and are yellow-brown to orange-brown with black stripes at the top part, and brown with darker brown and yellow-brown markings in the lower part.

== Senses ==
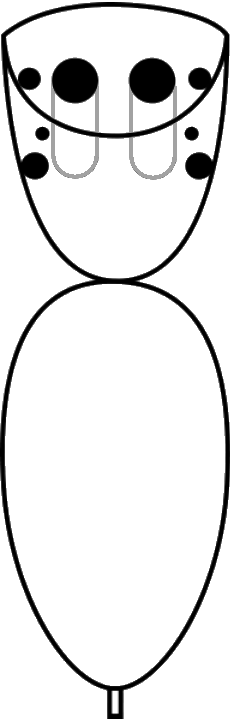
"Squared-off" cephalothorax and eye pattern of jumping spiders

Jumping spiders have significantly better vision than other spiders, much more acute than that of other animals of similar size, and clearer in daylight than a cat's and 10 times more acute than a dragonfly's. Jumping spiders have eight eyes, of which the two large ones in the center-and-front position (the anterior-median eyes, also called "principal eyes") are housed in tubes in the head and provide acute vision. The other six are secondary eyes, positioned along the sides of the carapace and acting mainly as motion detectors. In most jumping spiders, the middle pair of secondary eyes are very small and have no known function, but those of Portias are relatively large, and function as well as those of the other secondary eyes. The main eyes focus accurately on an object at distances from approximately 2 centimetres to infinity, and in practice can see up to about 75 centimetres. Like all jumping spiders, Portias can take in only a small visual field at one time, as the most acute part of a main eye can see all of a circle up to 12 millimetres wide at 20 centimetres away, or up to 18 millimetres wide at 30 centimetres away.^{[a]} Jumping spider's main eyes can see from red to ultraviolet.

Generally the jumping spider subfamily Spartaeinae, which includes the genus Portia, cannot discriminate objects at such long distances as the members of subfamilies Salticinae or Lyssomaninae can. However, members of Portia have vision about as acute as the best of the jumping spiders, for example: the salticine Mogrus neglectus can distinguish prey and conspecifics up to 320 millimetres away (42 times its own body length), while P. fimbriata can distinguish these up to 280 millimetres (47 times its own body length). The main eyes of a Portia can also identify features of the scenery up to 85 times its own body length, which helps the spider to find detours.

However, a Portia takes a relatively long time to see objects, possibly because getting a good image out of such small eyes is a complex process and requires a lot of scanning.^{[e]} This makes a Portia vulnerable to much larger predators such as birds, frogs and mantises, which a Portia often cannot identify because of the predator's size.

Spiders, like other arthropods, have sensors, often modified setae (bristles), for smell, taste, touch and vibration protruding through their cuticle ("skin"). Unlike insects, spiders and other chelicerates do not have antennae.

== Hunting and feeding ==
Most species of jumping spiders appear to be cursorial (adapted to run), allowing them to hunt insects without using webs. However, species of the genus Portia prefer to hunt other spiders, often invading their victims' webs. Some Portia species including P. africana, also efficiently hunt other jumping spiders.

=== Tactics specific to Portia africana ===
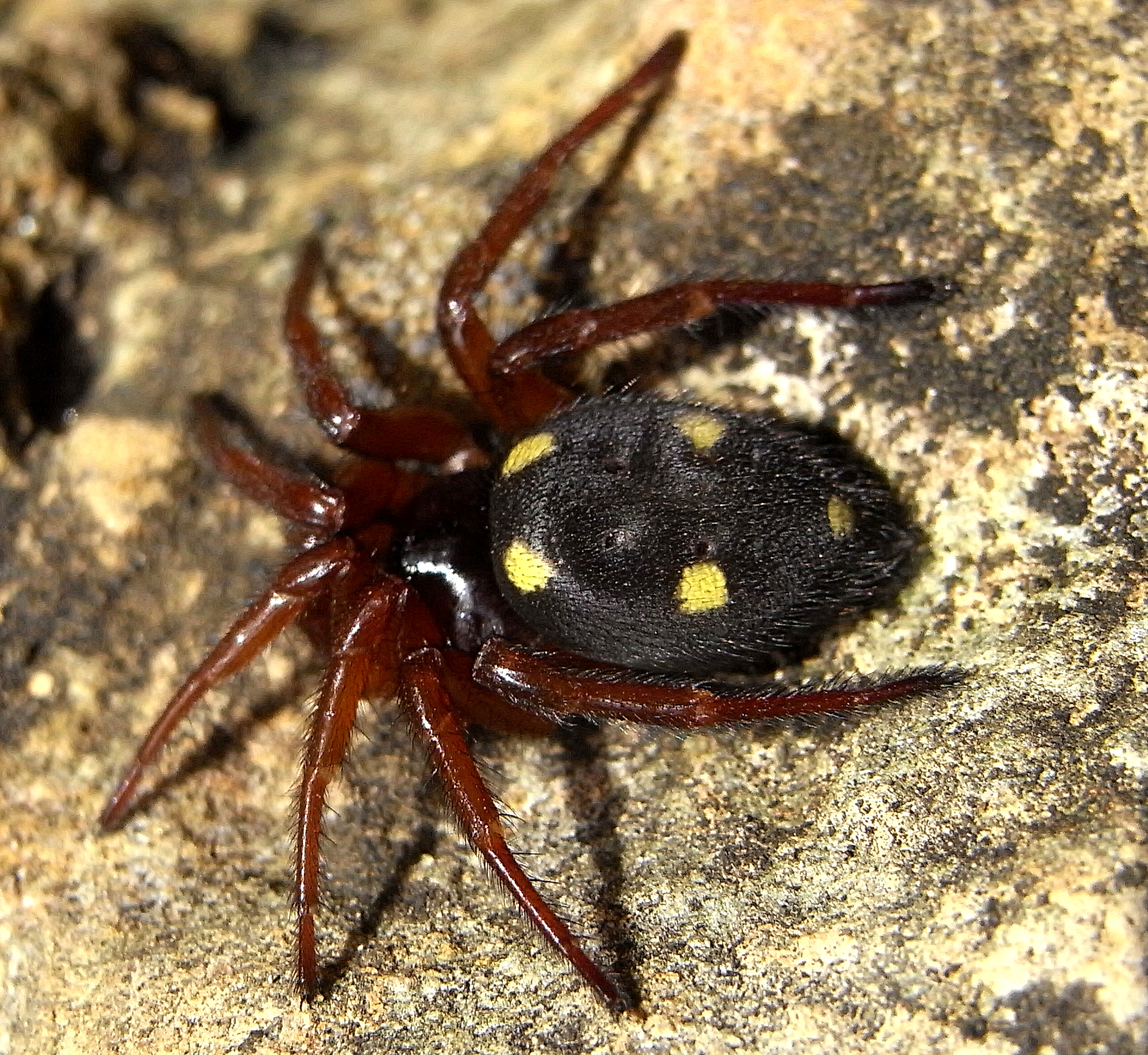
Sample of an oecobiid

In Kenya's Kimumu region, a savanna area which is dry and hot throughout the year, P. africana forms large numbers in the webs of other spiders, in the nest complexes of other jumping spiders, around solitary nests of other jumping spiders, and around the nests of oecobiid spiders. While most aggregations of P. africana there include adult and also juvenile of all stages, most groups consist only of small juveniles. A group of small juveniles can prevent jumping spiders and oecobiids from entering or leaving its nest. One of the juveniles will lunge and bite the victim, and sometimes others of the group join in feeding.

In vegetation near the shoreline of Lake Victoria, social jumping spiders build nest complexes, in which P. africana hunts, apparently without building capture-webs. The assassin bugs Nagusta sp. indet. ("not identified") and Scipinnia repax prey on P. africana and on social jumping spiders and other types of prey in the complexes. Nagusta usually hunts in groups of two to three, apparently catches P. africana when the latter is busy invading a jumping nest complex, and often shares the prey. Scipinnia repax preys on P. africana in a similar way but alone, and also preys on Nagusta.

=== Tactics used by most of Portia ===
Web-based spiders have poor spatial appreciation and get much of their information from reading tensions and movement in their web. P. africana, P. fimbraba and P. labiata can use their eight legs and two palps to pluck another spider's web with a virtually unlimited range of movements, using a trial and error method, until it finds and repeats a set of movements that either lures the prey out into the open or calms the prey while the Portia walks slowly close enough to bite the victim. If the prey stops being controlled by the sequence, the Portia tries new combinations until one works, and then repeats the new sequence.^{[e]} While such hunting shows use of least short-term memory, as of 2011 researchers do not know how long a Portia can retain such memories nor whether a Portia may use different trial and error starts for some prey species.

Such tactics enable Portia species to take web-based spiders from 10% to 200% of their size, and Portia species hunt in all types of webs. In contrast, other cursorial spiders generally have difficulty moving on webs, and web-building spiders find it difficult to move in webs unlike those they build. When hunting in another spider's web, the slow, choppy movements and the flaps on its legs make Portia species resemble leaf detritus caught in the web and blown in a breeze. P. africana and some other Portia species use breezes and other disturbances as "smokescreens" in which these predators can approach web-based spiders more quickly, and revert to a more cautious approach when the disturbance disappears. A few web spiders run away when they sense the un-rhythmical gait of a Portia entering the web – a reaction Wilcox and Jackson termed "Portia panic".

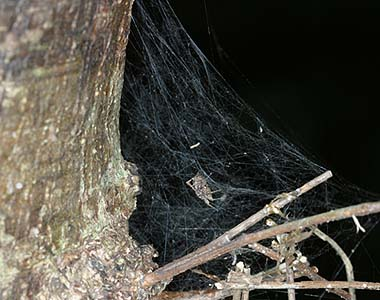
A P. fimbriata′s capture web is similar

Females of Portia also build webs to catch prey directly, and those of P. africana are usually attached to rigid surfaces such as rocks and tree trunks. These "capture webs" are funnel-shaped and widest at the top and are about 4,000 cubic centimetres in volume. The web is initially built in about 2 hours, and then gradually made stronger. A Portia often joins her own web on to one of a web-based non-salticid spider.

Portia species can make detours to find the best attack angle against dangerous prey, even when the best detour takes a Portia out of visual contact with the prey, and sometimes the planned route leads to abseiling down a silk thread and biting the prey from behind. Such detours may take up to an hour, and a Portia usually picks the best route even if it needs to walk past an incorrect route. If a Portia makes a mistake while hunting another spider, it may itself be killed.

When hunting, mature females of P. africana, P. fimbriata, P. labiata, and P. schultzi emit olfactory signals that reduce the risk that any other females, males or juveniles of the same species may contend for the same prey. The effect inhibits aggressive mimicry against a prey spider even if the prey spider is visible, and also if the prey is inhabiting any part of a web. If a female of one of these species smells a male of the same species, the female stimulates the males to court. These Portia species do not show this behaviour when they receive olfactory signals from members of other Portia species.

All Portia species eat eggs of other spiders, including eggs of their own species and of other cursorial spiders, and can extract eggs from cases ranging from the flimsy ones of Pholcus to the tough papery ones of Philoponella. While only P. fimbriata (in Queensland) captures cursorial spiders in their nests, all Portia species steal eggs from empty nests of cursorial spiders.

The venom of Portia is unusually powerful against spiders. When a Portia stabs a small to medium spider (up to its own weight), including another Portia, the prey usually runs away for about 100 to 200 millimetres, enters convulsions, becomes paralysed after 10 to 30 seconds, and continues convulsing for 10 seconds to 4 minutes. Portia slowly approaches the prey and takes it. Portia usually needs to inflict up to 15 stabbings to completely immobilise a larger spider (1.5 to 2 times its own weight), and then the Portia may wait about 20 to 200 millimetres away for 15 to 30 minutes from seizing the prey. Insects are usually not immobilised so quickly but continue to struggle, sometimes for several minutes.

In laboratory tests, P. africana appeared to be a poor hunter. These tests, like those for other Portia species, were individual contests between one hunter and one prey.

Differences in hunting tactics of females
Prey	Performance	P. africana	P. labiata	P. schultzi	P. fimbriata (Q)	P. fimbriata (NT)	P. fimbriata (SL)
Salticid	Tendency to pursue prey	77%	63%	58%	87%	50%	94%
Salticid	Efficiency in capturing prey	29%	40%	36%	93%	10%	45%
Web-building spider	Tendency to pursue prey	74%	83%	84%	91%	94%	64%
Web-building spider	Efficiency in capturing prey	65%	79%	72%	92%	81%	83%
Insect	Tendency to pursue prey	48%	35%	52%	27%	30%	43%
Insect	Efficiency in capturing prey	67%	71%	69%	41%	83%	78%

Notes on this table:

- "Tendency to pursue prey" is the percentage of tests in which the subject pursues the potential prey, and a pursuit starts when the Portia either approaches the prey or shakes the prey's web.
- "Efficiency in capturing prey" is the percentage of pursuits in which the subject captures the prey.
- P. africana specimens from Kenya's Kisumi area were used in this analysis.
- "(Q)", "(NT)" and "(SL)" identify P. fimbriatas from Queensland, Northern Territory and Sri Lanka.
- The prey used was: unspecified jumping spiders; amaurobiid and theridiid web-based spiders; and houseflies.

== Reproduction and lifecycle ==
While many jumping spiders rest in approximately circular nests, female Portia species place a leaf or similar object near the top of her capture web as a rest. A submature male also makes a similar nest in a capture web, but mature males do not make capture webs.

Before courtship, a male Portia spins a small web between boughs or twigs, which he hangs under and ejaculates on to. He then soaks the semen into reservoirs on his pedipalps, which are larger than those of females.

A female P. africana prefers to lay her eggs on a silken platform free from detritus.

In a laboratory, male P. africana copulated with female P. labiata but no eggs were laid. During all cases the female P. labiata twisted and lunged in an attempt to bite.

As in other Portia species, if a mature male meets a sub-mature female, he will try to cohabit with her.

When moulting, all Portias spin a horizontal web of a diameter about twice their body length and suspended 1 to 4 millimetres (0.039 to 0.157 in) below a leaf. The spider lies head down, and often slides down 20 to 30 millimetres (0.79 to 1.18 in) during moulting. They spin a similar temporary web when resting.

== Ecology ==
P. africana has been found in Angola, Cameroon, the Central African Republic, Gabon, Ghana, the Ivory Coast, Sierra Leone, Zaire and Zambia.

Around Kenya's Kisumi at the Equator, P. africana lives on level ground about 1,400 metres above sea level where there is no dry season, and inhabits open savanna containing clumps sisal and euphorbia.. There, P. africana appears in large, dense but localised populations of three species of jumping spider, all with bodies less than 5.0 millimetres long.

In vegetation near the shoreline of Lake Victoria, social jumping spiders build dense nest complexes, in which P. africana hunts. The assassin bugs Nagusta sp. indet. and Scipinnia repax prey on P. africana, and S. repax also preys on Nagusta.

== Taxonomy ==
Portia africana was originally described by Simon in 1886 as Linus africana. The species has also been named Cocalus africana (Thorell, 1893) and Neccocalus africana (Roewer, 1964), and finally P. africana since 1978.

Portia africana is one of 17 species in the genus Portia as of May 2011. Wanless divided the genus Portia into two species groups: the schultzi group, in which males' palps have a fixed tibial apophysis; and the kenti group, in which the apophysis of each palp in the males has a joint separated by a membrane. The schultzi group includes P. schultzi, P. africana, P. fimbriata, and P. labiata.

Portia africana is closely relation to P. alboguttata, of which only females have been found, in Malawi and South Africa.

The genus Portia is in the subfamily Spartaeinae, which is thought to be primitive. Molecular phylogeny, a technique that compares the DNA of organisms to construct the tree of life, indicates that Portia is a member of the clade Spartaeinae, that Spartaeinae is basal (quite similar to the ancestors of all jumping spiders), and that the Spartaeus, Phaeacius, and Holcolaetis genera are its closest relatives.

== Notes ==
a: Jackson and Blest (1982) say, "The resolution of the receptor mosaic of Layer I in the central retina was estimated to be a visual angle of 2.4 arc min, corresponding to 0–12 mm at 20 cm in front of the spider, or 0–18 mm at 30 cm."

b: Several species of cursorial spiders drink nectar as an occasional supplement their diet, and juveniles of some orb-web spiders digest pollen while re-cycling their webs. One jumping spider (as of 2010), Bagheera kiplingi, is almost totally herbivorous.

c: "Propulsive displays" are sudden, quick movements including striking, charging, ramming and leaps.

d: The retina is at the end of a tube. The inner end of the tube moves from side to side in one to two cycles per second, and twists 50° in a cycle that takes 10 seconds.

e: P. schultzi does not plucks the prey spider's web.
