= Cycloptilum slossoni =

Scientific classification
- Kingdom: Animalia
- Phylum: Arthropoda
- Class: Insecta
- Order: Orthoptera
- Suborder: Ensifera
- Family: Mogoplistidae
- Tribe: Arachnocephalini
- Genus: Cycloptilum
- Species: C. slossoni

Binomial name
- Cycloptilum slossoni (Scudder, 1897)

Synonyms
- Mogisoplistus slossoni Scudder, 1897

Species of cricket

Cycloptilum slossoni, or Slosson's scaly cricket, is a species of scaly cricket in the family Mogoplistidae. It is found in North America. This species was first described by Samuel Hubbard Scudder in 1897 and originally named Mogisoplistus slossoni.
