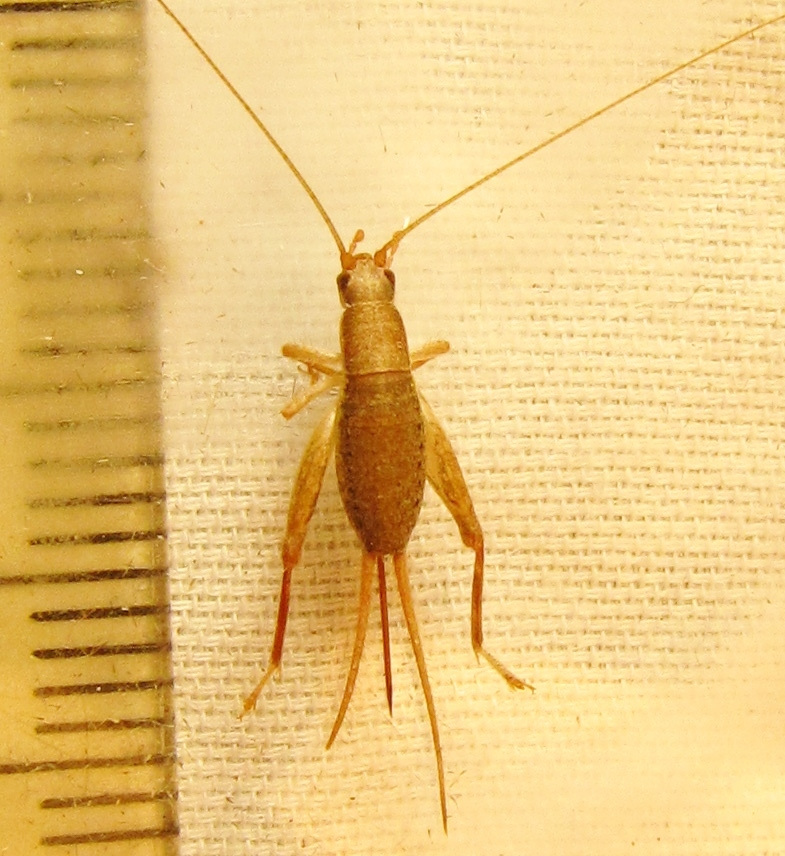

Scientific classification
- Domain: Eukaryota
- Kingdom: Animalia
- Phylum: Arthropoda
- Class: Insecta
- Order: Orthoptera
- Suborder: Ensifera
- Family: Mogoplistidae
- Tribe: Arachnocephalini
- Genus: Cycloptilum
- Species: C. trigonipalpum

Binomial name
- Cycloptilum trigonipalpum (Rehn & Hebard, 1912)

= Cycloptilum trigonipalpum =

Species of cricket

Cycloptilum trigonipalpum, the forest scaly cricket, is a species of scaly cricket in the family Mogoplistidae. It is found in North America.
