= Hoplosphyrum boreale =

Scientific classification
- Domain: Eukaryota
- Kingdom: Animalia
- Phylum: Arthropoda
- Class: Insecta
- Order: Orthoptera
- Suborder: Ensifera
- Family: Mogoplistidae
- Tribe: Mogoplistini
- Genus: Hoplosphyrum
- Species: H. boreale

Binomial name
- Hoplosphyrum boreale (Scudder, 1902)

Species of cricket

Hoplosphyrum boreale, known generally as the western bush cricket or long-winged scaly cricket, is a species of scaly cricket in the family Mogoplistidae. It is found in North America.
