= Cycloptilum irregularis =

Conservation status
- Vulnerable (IUCN 2.3)

Scientific classification
- Kingdom: Animalia
- Phylum: Arthropoda
- Class: Insecta
- Order: Orthoptera
- Suborder: Ensifera
- Family: Mogoplistidae
- Genus: Cycloptilum
- Species: C. irregularis

Binomial name
- Cycloptilum irregularis Love & Walker, 1979

Species of cricket

Cycloptilum irregularis is a species of cricket endemic to the United States.
