= Cycloptilum squamosum =

Scientific classification
- Domain: Eukaryota
- Kingdom: Animalia
- Phylum: Arthropoda
- Class: Insecta
- Order: Orthoptera
- Suborder: Ensifera
- Family: Mogoplistidae
- Tribe: Arachnocephalini
- Genus: Cycloptilum
- Species: C. squamosum

Binomial name
- Cycloptilum squamosum Scudder, 1869

Species of cricket

Cycloptilum squamosum, known generally as the Scudder's scaly cricket or Scudder's scaly bush cricket, is a species of scaly cricket in the family Mogoplistidae. It is found in North America.
