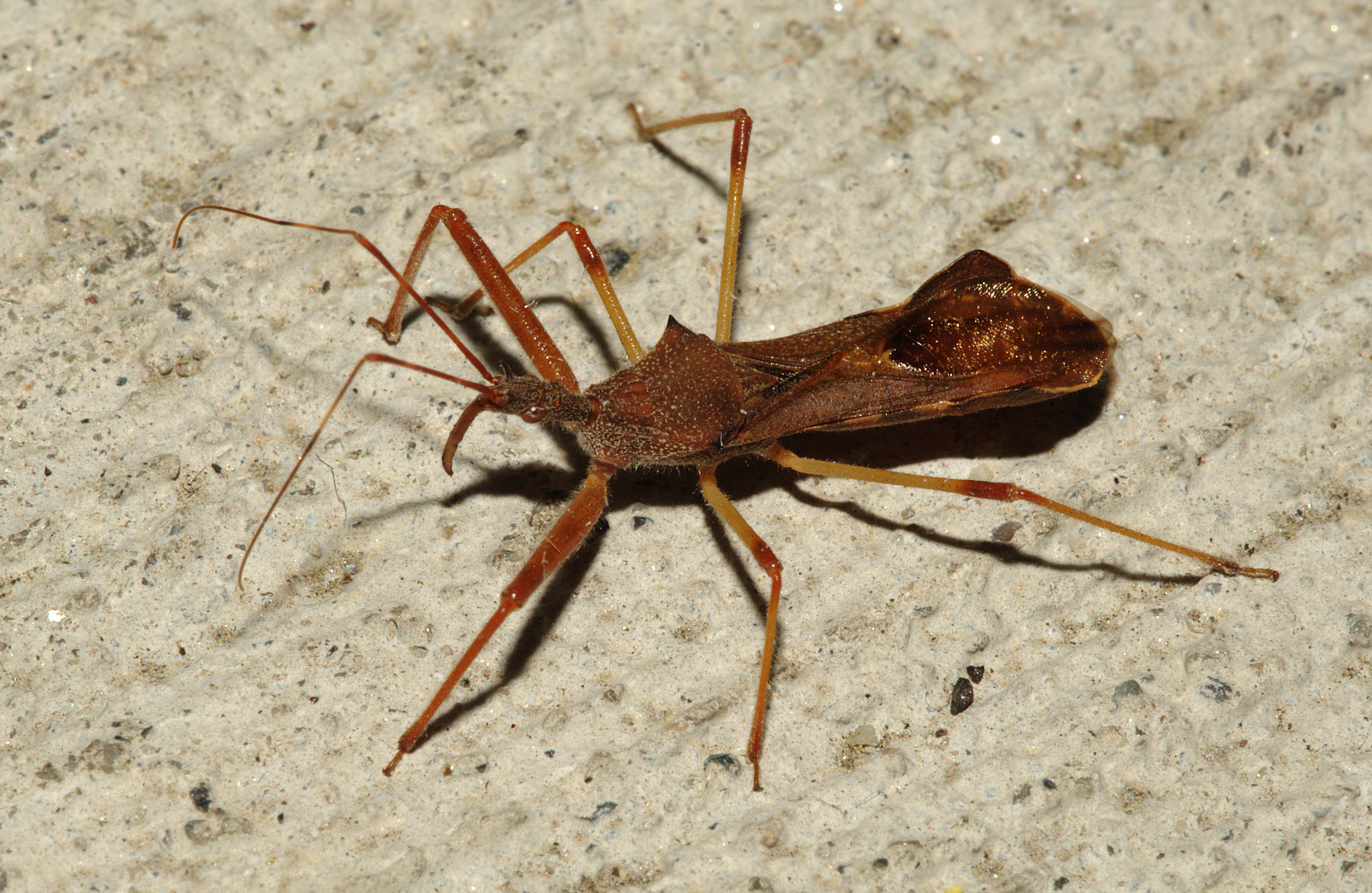

Scientific classification
- Kingdom: Animalia
- Phylum: Arthropoda
- Clade: Pancrustacea
- Class: Insecta
- Order: Hemiptera
- Suborder: Heteroptera
- Family: Reduviidae
- Genus: Nagusta
- Species: N. goedelii

Binomial name
- Nagusta goedelii (Kolenati, 1857)

Synonyms
- Zelus goedelii Kolenati, 1857

= Nagusta goedelii =

Species of true bug

Nagusta goedelii is a species of assassin bugs in the family Reduviidae.

== Distribution ==
This species is present in Central and Southern Europe (Austria, Bosnia and Herzegovina, Bulgaria, Croatia, Cyprus, European Turkey, France, Greece, Hungary, Italy, Republic of Moldova, North Macedonia, Romania, Slovakia, Slovenia, Ukraine and former Yugoslavia), and in the Middle East. In the East it reaches Iran. These insects apparently are extending their distribution from east towards more western and northern areas.

== Description ==
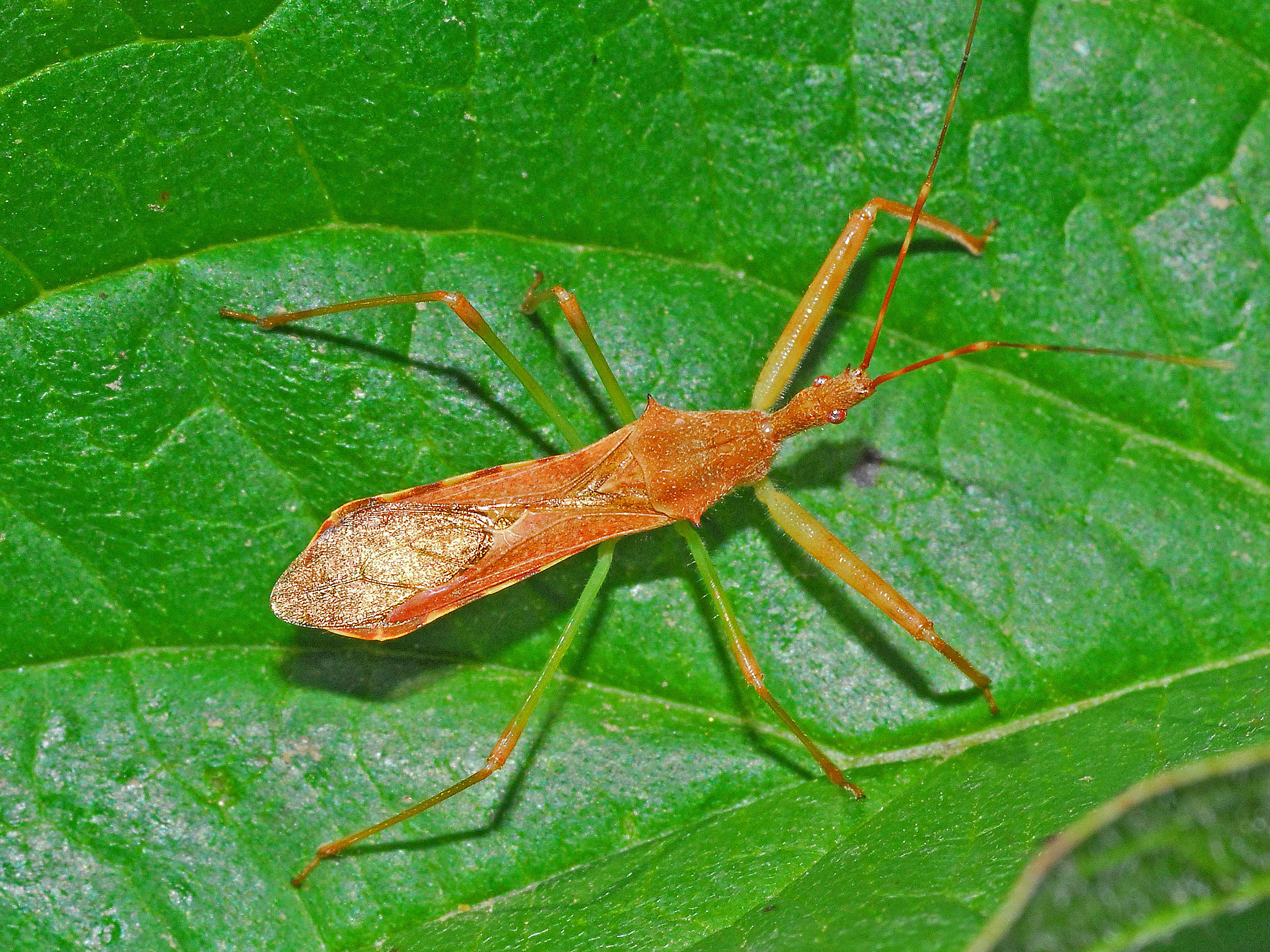
Dorsal view

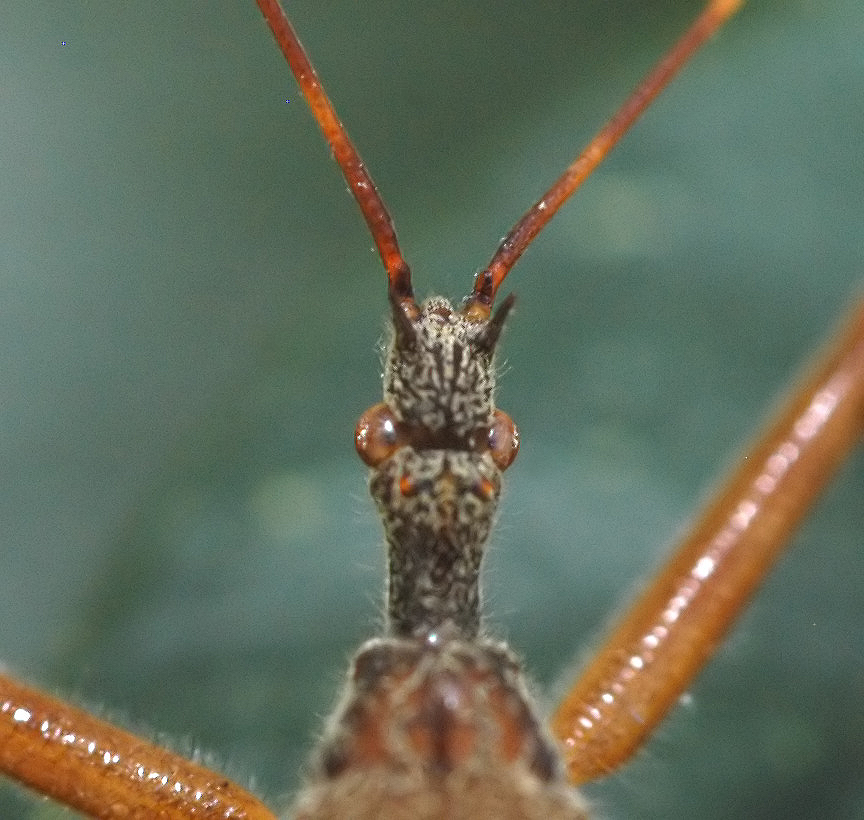
Close-up of the head

Nagusta goedelii can reach a body length of about 12.5–16.3 mm (0.49–0.64 in). The slender and slightly hairy body is yellow to cinnamon-brown, but some darker specimens can be brown or reddish with greenish veins. The head is more than twice as long as the width and it has protruding ocelli. It shows two characteristic horn-like thorns just behind the antennae. Antennae show the same color as the body, with lighter rings. The posterior lobe of the head ends in a cylindrical neck. The pronotum is almost hexagonal and carries two broad and rounded apophyses in the shape of an obtuse cone. The diameter of the anterior femurs is at least three times the diameter of the mid and posterior ones, while the tibiae are all of the same thickness.

== Biology ==
The species has only one generation per year (univoltine). Mating and egg laying take place in spring. The larvae reach the adult stage in August and September. The imago overwinters. In warm, sunny regions these assassin bugs live on deciduous trees, especially on oaks (Quercus species), more rarely on shrubs. These bugs feed exclusively on other insects and possibly arachnids and lepidopteran larvae. They are recorded to prey flatid planthoppers (Metcalfa pruinosa), the larvae of Macrophya punctumalbum, the cricket Arachnocephalus vestitus, but also several diptera.

== Bibliography ==
- E. Wachmann, A. Melber, J. Deckert: Wanzen Band 2: Cimicomorpha: Microphysidae (Flechtenwanzen), Miridae (Weichwanzen). Neubearbeitung der Wanzen Deutschlands, Österreichs und der deutschsprachigen Schweiz, Goecke & Evers, Keltern 2004, ISBN 3-931374-57-2. (in German)
- E. Wagner: Heteroptera Hemiptera. In: P. Brohmer, P. Ehrmann, G. Ulmer (Hrsg.): Die Tierwelt Mitteleuropas. IV, 3 (Xa). Leipzig 1959, 173 S. (in German)
- Hoberlandt L., 1955. Results of the zoological scientific expedition of the National Museum in Praha to Turkey. Acta Entomologica Musei Nationalis Pragae, Suppl. 3: 162-263.
- Kment P. & Dolesova K., 2010. The assassin bug Nagusta goedelii (Hemiptera: Heteroptera: Reduviidae) in Prague: an accidental introduction? Klapalekiana, 46: 191-201.
- Linnavuori R.E., 1961. Hemiptera of Israel I. Annales Zoologici Societatis Zoologicae Botanicae Fennicae ‘Vanamo’, 22 (1):1-71. OLIVIERI N., 2011. Nagusta goedelii (Kolenati, 1857) (Heteroptera Reduviidae). Bollettino della Società entomologica italiana, 143 (1): 40.
- Putshkov P.V. & MOULET P., 2010. Hémiptères Reduviidae d’Europe occidentale. Faune de France et régions limitrophes. Vol. 92. Fédération Française des Sociétés de Sciences Naturelles, Paris, 668 pp.
- Putshkov P.V. & Putshkov V.G., 1996. Family Reduviidae Latreille, 1807 – assassin-bugs, (pp. 148-265). In: Aukema B. & Rieger C. (eds.). Catalogue of the Heteroptera of the Palaearctic Region. Vol. 2, Cimicomorpha I. The Netherlands Entomological Society, Amsterdam, XIV + 360 pp.
- Putshkov P.V., 1979. The immature stages of Nagusta goedelii Stål (Heteroptera, Reduviidae) and its bionomics in the Ukrainian SSR. Dopovidi Akademii Nauk Ukrainskoi RSR (B), 1979(9): 765-768.
- Putshkov P.V., 1987. Faune d'Ukraine, Héteroptères Reduviidae. (Fauna Ukrainy, 21. Poluzestkokrylye, 5. Khischnesty). Académie des Sciences d'Ukraine, Kiev, USSR, 248 pp.
