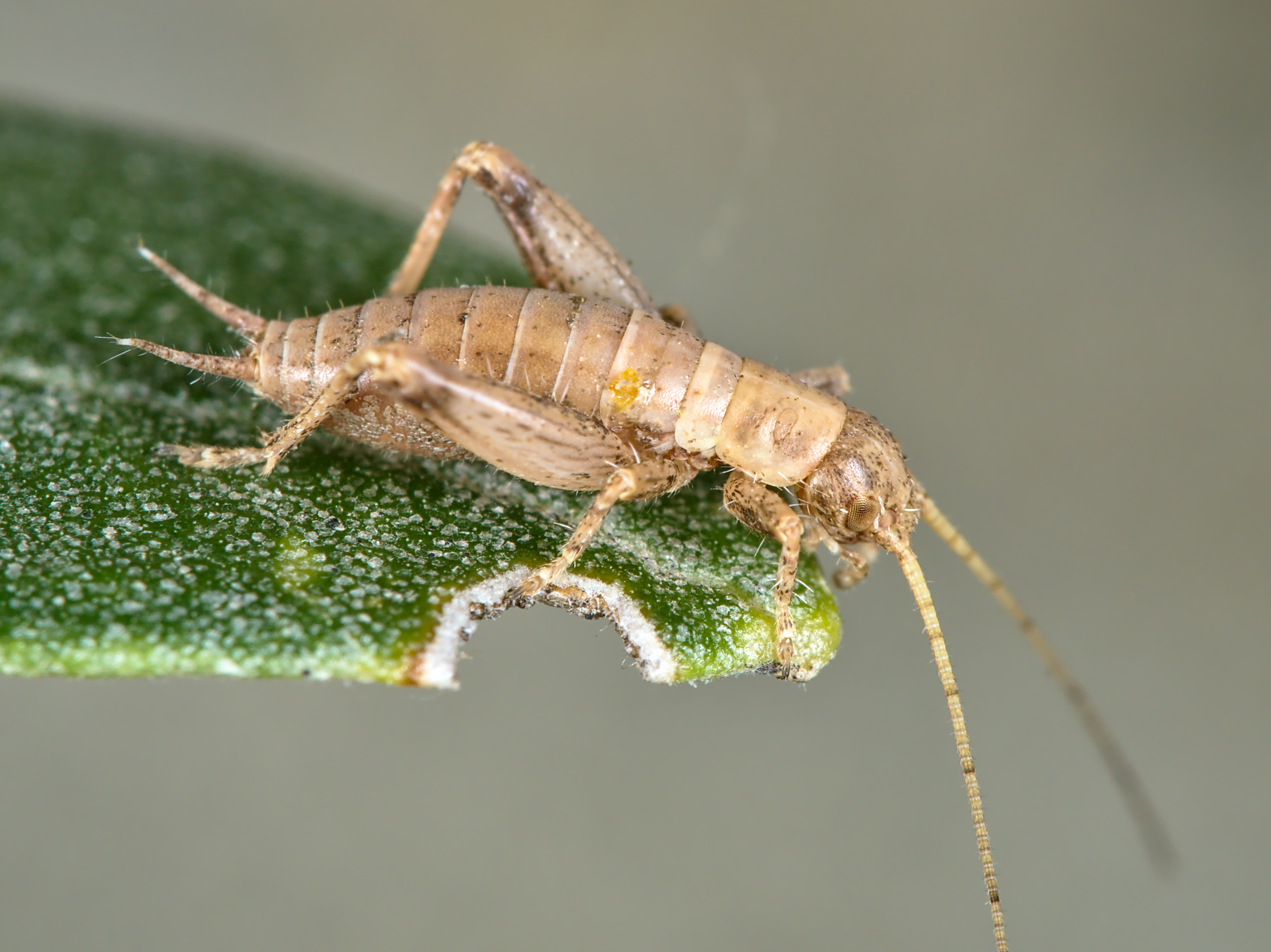

Conservation status
- Least Concern (IUCN 3.1)

Scientific classification
- Kingdom: Animalia
- Phylum: Arthropoda
- Class: Insecta
- Order: Orthoptera
- Suborder: Ensifera
- Family: Mogoplistidae
- Genus: Arachnocephalus
- Species: A. vestitus

Binomial name
- Arachnocephalus vestitus Costa, 1855

= Arachnocephalus vestitus =

Species of cricket

Arachnocephalus vestitus, the hairy scale-cricket, is a species of scaly cricket belonging to the family Mogoplistidae. It has a widespread distribution across the Mediterranean.

== Distribution ==
This species is found in coastal Albania, southern and coastal Bulgaria, Cyprus, coastal Croatia, coastal Bosnia and Hercegovina, mainland coastal Greece (including islands of Crete and the eastern Aegean Islands), southern France (including Corsica), Italy (including Sicily and Sardinia), coastal Montenegro, eastern North Macedonia, coastal Romania, coastal Slovenia, Spain (including the Balearic Islands), southern Portugal, and in coastal Ukraine, the northern Russian coast of the Black Sea (including Crimea).
