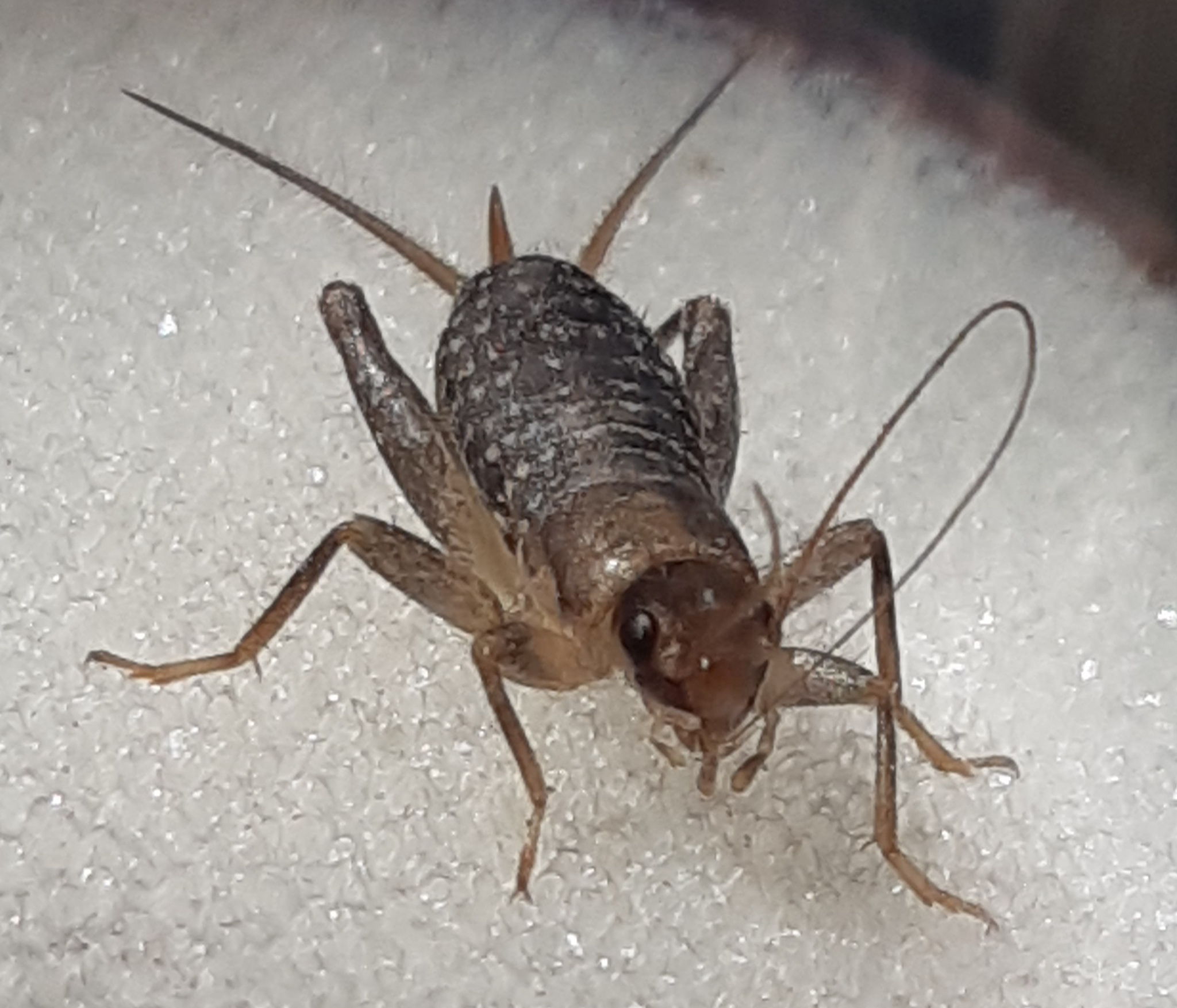

Scientific classification
- Domain: Eukaryota
- Kingdom: Animalia
- Phylum: Arthropoda
- Class: Insecta
- Order: Orthoptera
- Suborder: Ensifera
- Family: Mogoplistidae
- Subfamily: Mogoplistinae
- Tribe: Arachnocephalini
- Genus: Pseudomogoplistes
- Species: P. squamiger

Binomial name
- Pseudomogoplistes squamiger (Fischer, 1853)

Synonyms
- Gryllus squamiger Fischer, 1853; Mogoplistus squamiger (Fischer, 1853); Mogoplistes talitrus Costa, 1855

= Pseudomogoplistes squamiger =

Species of cricket

Pseudomogoplistes squamiger, the scaly cricket, is a species of apterous cricket in the family Mogoplistidae. Long known in the genus Mogoplistes it was placed this genus, for which it became the type species, by AV Gorochov in 1984.

== Distribution and habitat ==
Usually found near the sea on pebble beaches, its native range is in southern Europe and northern Africa, but since the 1960s it has been recorded from Dorset, and later Devon in the British Isles.

== See also ==
- iNaturalist: image as the "Mediterranean Beach-Cricket"
- List of Orthoptera and allied insects of Great Britain
