= Collendina =

Scientific classification
- Domain: Eukaryota
- Kingdom: Animalia
- Phylum: Arthropoda
- Class: Insecta
- Order: Orthoptera
- Suborder: Ensifera
- Family: Mogoplistidae
- Subfamily: Mogoplistinae
- Tribe: Mogoplistini
- Genus: Collendina; Otte & Alexander, 1983

Genus of crickets

Collendina is a genus of Australian "coastal scaled crickets" in the tribe Mogoplistini.

== Species ==
The Orthoptera Species File lists:

1. Collendina elanora Otte & Alexander, 1983
2. Collendina fascipes (Chopard, 1951)
3. Collendina iterala Otte & Alexander, 1983
4. Collendina kira Otte & Alexander, 1983
5. Collendina mamoura Otte & Alexander, 1983
6. Collendina ora Otte & Alexander, 1983 - type species
