= Dicranorhina kohli =

Scientific classification
- Kingdom: Animalia
- Phylum: Arthropoda
- Clade: Pancrustacea
- Class: Insecta
- Order: Hymenoptera
- Family: Crabronidae
- Genus: Dicranorhina
- Species: D. kohli

Binomial name
- Dicranorhina kohli (Brauns, 1899)

Synonyms
- Piagetia kohli Brauns, 1899; Piagetia striata Cameron, 1905

Species of wasp

Dicranorhina kohli is a species of square-headed wasps (Crabronidae). One of two African species of Dicranorhina.

== Description ==
Length 9-10 mm. Predominantly black, with the following parts ferruginous: mandibles (except the apices), front legs, tibiae of the middle and back legs, the scape and the first three segments of the flagellum, clypeus, tegulae, margins of the pronotal tubercles.

== Range ==
Eastern and southern Africa (South Africa, Zimbabwe, Tanzania).

== Etymology ==
Named after Franz Friedrich Kohl.
