= Micrornebius =

Scientific classification
- Domain: Eukaryota
- Kingdom: Animalia
- Phylum: Arthropoda
- Class: Insecta
- Order: Orthoptera
- Suborder: Ensifera
- Family: Mogoplistidae
- Subfamily: Mogoplistinae
- Tribe: Mogoplistini
- Genus: Micrornebius; Chopard, 1969

Synonyms
- Micrornebius Chopard, 1968

Genus of crickets

External image
- Image at iNaturalist

Micrornebius is a genus of crickets (Orthoptera: Ensifera) in the subfamily Mogoplistinae, tribe Mogoplistini.

The recorded distribution of species is primarily Asian and includes: India, Indo-China, Hainan, Taiwan and western Malesia. However, M. lesnei occurs in Mozambique.

== Species ==
A key to species of Micrornebius is given by Tan; the Orthoptera Species File lists:

1. Micrornebius annandalei (Chopard, 1924)
2. Micrornebius aquilus Gorochov, 1992
3. Micrornebius cylindricus Ingrisch, 2006
4. Micrornebius distinctus Tan, 2014
5. Micrornebius eclipsus Tan, 2014
6. Micrornebius gracilicornis Chopard, 1969 – type species (type locality Depok, Java)
7. Micrornebius hainanensis Yin, 1998
8. Micrornebius incertus (Ingrisch, 1998)
9. Micrornebius inopinatus Ingrisch, 2006
10. Micrornebius insularis Ingrisch, 2006
11. Micrornebius kopisua Tan & Ingrisch, 2013
12. Micrornebius laem Ingrisch, 2006
13. Micrornebius lesnei (Chopard, 1935)
14. Micrornebius lineatus Ingrisch, 2006
15. Micrornebius malaya Tan & Kamaruddin, 2013
16. Micrornebius mandai Tan, 2014
17. Micrornebius maninjau Ingrisch, 2006
18. Micrornebius perrarus Yang & Yen, 2001
19. Micrornebius spadiceus Gorochov, 1994
