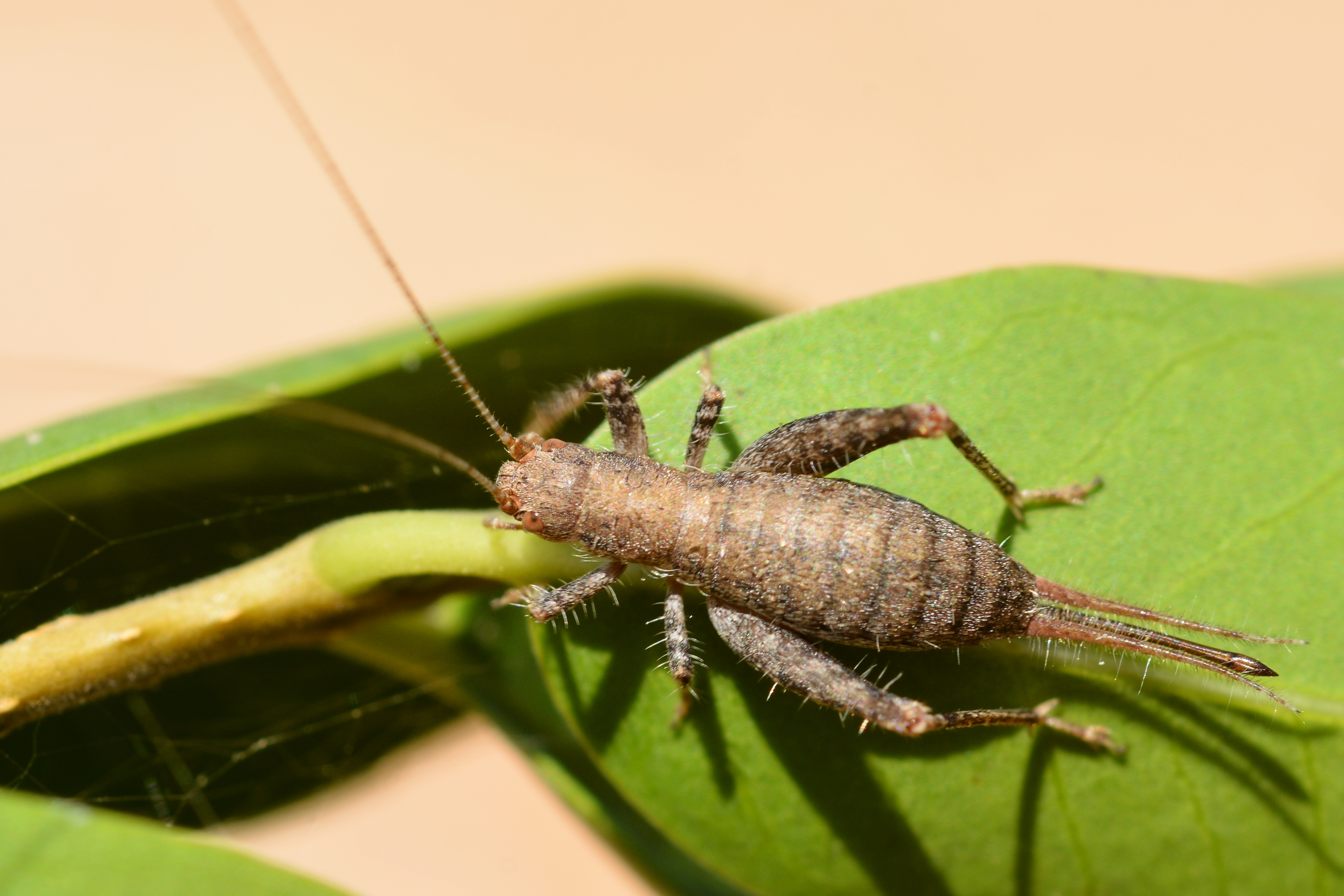
- Arachnocephalus vestitus

Scientific classification
- Domain: Eukaryota
- Kingdom: Animalia
- Phylum: Arthropoda
- Class: Insecta
- Order: Orthoptera
- Suborder: Ensifera
- Family: Mogoplistidae
- Subfamily: Mogoplistinae
- Tribe: Arachnocephalini
- Genus: Arachnocephalus; Costa, 1855

Synonyms
- Physoblemma Brunner von Wattenwyl, 1873; Pseudometrypa Karsch, 1896

= Arachnocephalus =

Genus of crickets

External image
- Images at iNaturalist

Arachnocephalus is a genus of crickets in the family Mogoplistidae and typical of the tribe Arachnocephalini, erected by O.G. Costa in 1855. Widespread records of distribution are discontinuous (and probably incomplete), they include: Africa, Europe, Asia, Australia and South America.

== Species ==
The Orthoptera Species File lists:

1. Arachnocephalus angustifrons Chopard, 1955
2. Arachnocephalus australicus Chopard, 1925
3. Arachnocephalus bidentatus Chopard, 1951
4. Arachnocephalus breviceps Chopard, 1929
5. Arachnocephalus brevis Gorochov, 2017
6. Arachnocephalus brevissimus Shiraki, 1911
7. Arachnocephalus brincki Chopard, 1955
8. Arachnocephalus brunnerianus Saussure, 1877
9. Arachnocephalus bugnioni Chopard, 1969
10. Arachnocephalus dewitzi Saussure, 1877
11. Arachnocephalus gracilis Chopard, 1929
12. Arachnocephalus kevani Chopard, 1954
13. Arachnocephalus longicercis Chopard, 1925
14. Arachnocephalus maculifrons Roy, 1969
15. Arachnocephalus maritimus Saussure, 1877
16. Arachnocephalus mediocris Chopard, 1955
17. Arachnocephalus medvedevi Gorochov, 1994
18. Arachnocephalus meruensis Sjöstedt, 1910
19. Arachnocephalus minutus Chopard, 1955
20. Arachnocephalus nigrifrons Chopard, 1917
21. Arachnocephalus putridus (Karsch, 1896)
22. Arachnocephalus rufoniger (Sjöstedt, 1910)
23. Arachnocephalus shackletoni Chopard, 1925
24. Arachnocephalus steini Saussure, 1877
25. Arachnocephalus subsulcatus Saussure, 1899
26. Arachnocephalus vestitus Costa, 1855 - type species
