= Hoplosphyrum =

Scientific classification
- Domain: Eukaryota
- Kingdom: Animalia
- Phylum: Arthropoda
- Class: Insecta
- Order: Orthoptera
- Suborder: Ensifera
- Family: Mogoplistidae
- Subfamily: Mogoplistinae
- Tribe: Mogoplistini
- Genus: Hoplosphyrum; Rehn & Hebard, 1912

Genus of crickets

Hoplosphyrum is a genus of scaly crickets in the family Mogoplistidae. There are about six described species in Hoplosphyrum, from Africa and the Americas

== Species ==
These six species belong to the genus Hoplosphyrum:

- Hoplosphyrum aztecum (Saussure, 1897)
- Hoplosphyrum boreale (Scudder, 1902) (western bush cricket)
- Hoplosphyrum griseum (Philippi, 1863)
- Hoplosphyrum occidentale (Scudder, 1869)
- Hoplosphyrum rufum (Chopard, 1932)
- Hoplosphyrum skottsbergi Chopard, 1923
