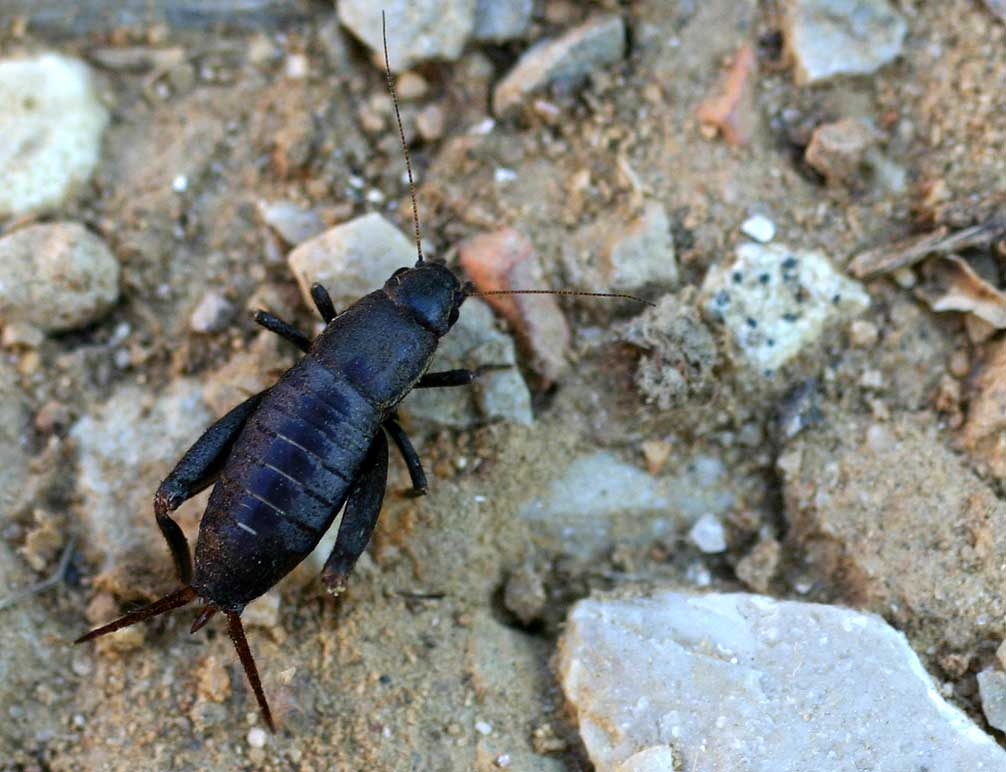
- Mogoplistes brunneus

Scientific classification
- Domain: Eukaryota
- Kingdom: Animalia
- Phylum: Arthropoda
- Class: Insecta
- Order: Orthoptera
- Suborder: Ensifera
- Family: Mogoplistidae
- Subfamily: Mogoplistinae
- Tribe: Mogoplistini
- Genus: Mogoplistes; Serville, 1838

Synonyms
- Mogisoplistes Finot, 1883; Mogisoplistus Saussure, 1877; Mogistoplistus Werner, 1934; Mogoplistus Scudder, 1869

= Mogoplistes =

Genus of crickets

External image
- Images at iNaturalist

Mogoplistes is a genus of African and European crickets which is typical of the family Mogoplistidae and tribe Mogoplistini, erected by Jean Guillaume Audinet-Serville in 1838. This genus is distributed around the Mediterranean in mainland Europe and North Africa. In 1984, the scaly cricket was moved from here to the new genus Pseudomogoplistes.

== Species ==
The Orthoptera Species File lists:

1. Mogoplistes argentatus Bolívar, 1881
2. Mogoplistes brunneus Serville, 1838 - type species
3. Mogoplistes kinzelbachi Harz, 1976
4. Mogoplistes tridentatus Saussure, 1877
