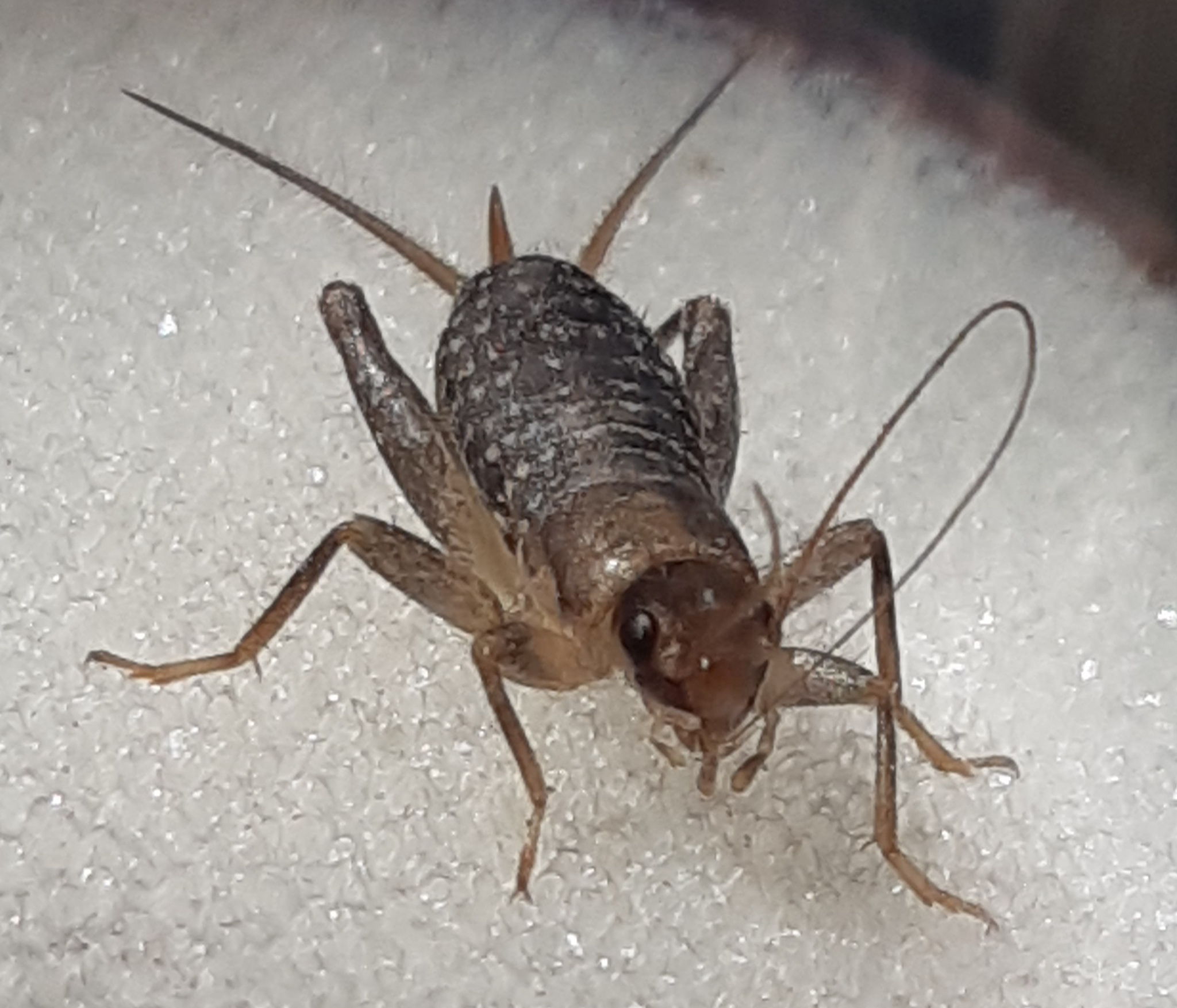
- Pseudomogoplistes squamiger

Scientific classification
- Domain: Eukaryota
- Kingdom: Animalia
- Phylum: Arthropoda
- Class: Insecta
- Order: Orthoptera
- Suborder: Ensifera
- Family: Mogoplistidae
- Tribe: Arachnocephalini
- Genus: Pseudomogoplistes; Gorochov, 1984

= Pseudomogoplistes =

Genus of crickets

Pseudomogoplistes is a genus of crickets in the family Mogoplistidae, erected by AV Gorochov in 1984. The recorded distribution of species is Europe and North Africa.

== Species ==
The Orthoptera Species File lists the following:

1. Pseudomogoplistes byzantius Gorochov, 1995
2. Pseudomogoplistes madeirae Gorochov & Marshall, 2001
3. Pseudomogoplistes squamiger (Fischer, 1853)
  - type species (as Gryllus squamiger Fischer)
4. Pseudomogoplistes turcicus Gorochov, 1995
5. Pseudomogoplistes vicentae Gorochov, 1996
