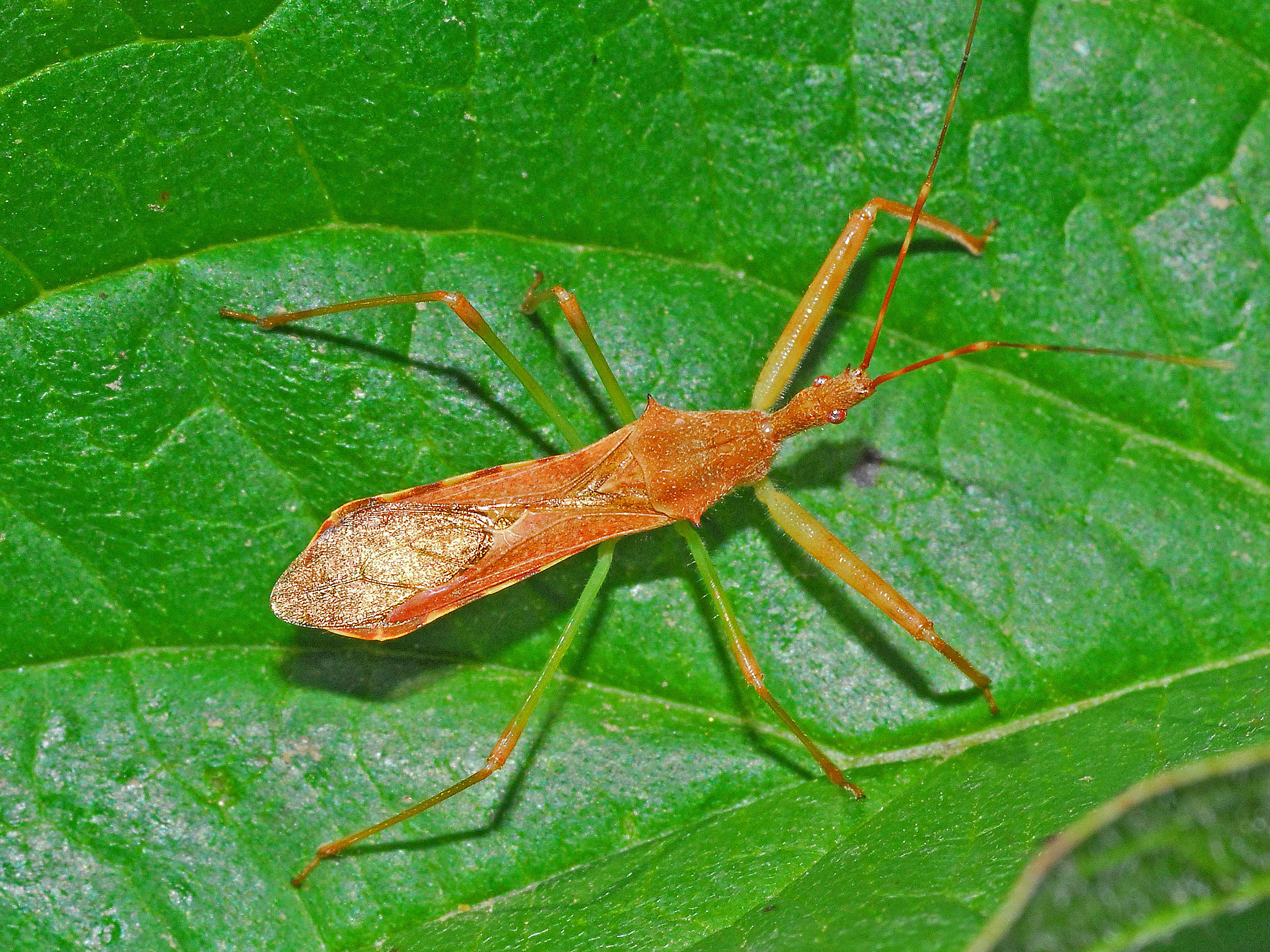
- Nagusta goedelii

Scientific classification
- Kingdom: Animalia
- Phylum: Arthropoda
- Clade: Pancrustacea
- Class: Insecta
- Order: Hemiptera
- Suborder: Heteroptera
- Family: Reduviidae
- Tribe: Harpactorini
- Genus: Nagusta; Stål, 1859

Synonyms
- Dinagusta Schouteden, 1912; Nagustana Miller, 1956; Phanerocoris Jakovlev, 1875

= Nagusta =

Genus of true bugs

Nagusta is a genus of assassin bugs in the family Reduviidae.

== Species ==
Species within this genus include:

- Nagusta aethiopica Villiers, 1967
- Nagusta albata Distant, 1903
- Nagusta atlantis (Miller, 1956)
- Nagusta burgeoni Schouteden, 1952
- Nagusta calamobata Breddin, 1903
- Nagusta carayoni Villiers, 1949
- Nagusta decorsei Villiers, 1951
- Nagusta dubia Villiers, 1966
- Nagusta gigas Schouteden, 1952
- Nagusta goedelii (Kolenati, 1857)
- Nagusta gracilis (Varela, 1905)
- Nagusta ivondroensis Villiers, 1951
- Nagusta junodi Montandon, 1892
- Nagusta leopoldi (Schouteden, 1929)
- Nagusta macroloba Bergroth, 1907
- Nagusta maura Distant, 1913
- Nagusta mirei Villiers, 1967
- Nagusta nigerensis Villiers, 1948
- Nagusta nigrina Villiers, 1963
- Nagusta praecatoria (Fabricius, 1794)
- Nagusta pretoriae Miller, 1956
- Nagusta pruinosa Villiers, 1948
- Nagusta punctaticollis Stål, 1865
- Nagusta ruindica Schouteden, 1944
- Nagusta rutshurica Schouteden, 1944
- Nagusta saegeri (Villiers, 1932)
- Nagusta schmitzi Villiers, 1967
- Nagusta schoutedeni Villiers, 1967
- Nagusta sigwalti Villiers, 1959
- Nagusta simonis Puton, 1890
- Nagusta simplex Bergroth, 1907
- Nagusta singalensis Distant, 1909
- Nagusta subflava Distant, 1903
- Nagusta synavei Villiers, 1973
- Nagusta tinantae Villiers, 1932
- Nagusta tuberosa Stål, 1874
- Nagusta uluguruensis Villiers, 1962
