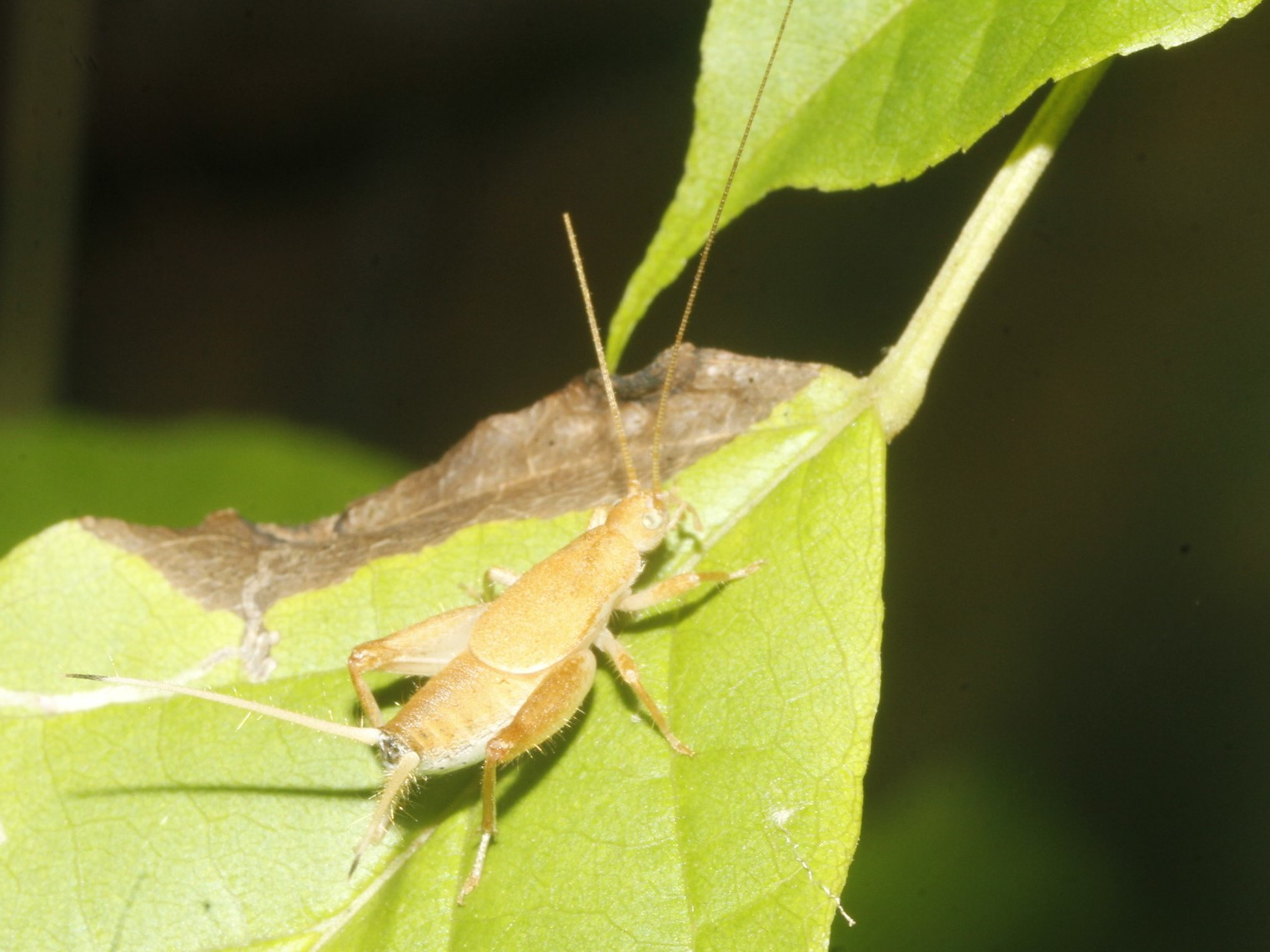
- Cycloptilum sp.

Scientific classification
- Domain: Eukaryota
- Kingdom: Animalia
- Phylum: Arthropoda
- Class: Insecta
- Order: Orthoptera
- Suborder: Ensifera
- Family: Mogoplistidae
- Tribe: Arachnocephalini
- Genus: Cycloptilum; Scudder, 1869

= Cycloptilum =

Genus of crickets

Cycloptilum is a genus of common scaly crickets in the family Mogoplistidae from the Americas. There are at least 50 described species in Cycloptilum.

== Species ==
These 53 species belong to the genus Cycloptilum:

- Cycloptilum absconditum Otte, D. & Perez-Gelabert, 2009^{c g}
- Cycloptilum abstrusum Otte, D. & Perez-Gelabert, 2009^{c g}
- Cycloptilum adecton Otte, D. & Perez-Gelabert, 2009^{c g}
- Cycloptilum ainiktos Love and Walker, 1979^{i c g}
- Cycloptilum albocircum Love and Walker, 1979^{i c g}
- Cycloptilum ambrosion Otte, D. & Perez-Gelabert, 2009^{c g}
- Cycloptilum animosum Otte, D. & Perez-Gelabert, 2009^{c g}
- Cycloptilum antillarum (Redtenbacher, 1892)^{c g}
- Cycloptilum antimimon Otte, D. & Perez-Gelabert, 2009^{c g}
- Cycloptilum aphanton Otte, D. & Perez-Gelabert, 2009^{c g}
- Cycloptilum bidens Hebard, 1931^{i c g b} (two-toothed scaly cricket)
- Cycloptilum celatum Otte, D. & Perez-Gelabert, 2009^{c g}
- Cycloptilum cineticon Otte, D. & Perez-Gelabert, 2009^{c g}
- Cycloptilum clandestinum Otte, D. & Perez-Gelabert, 2009^{c g}
- Cycloptilum comprehendens Hebard, 1929^{i c g b} (syncopated scaly cricket)
- Cycloptilum comptus Otte, D. & Perez-Gelabert, 2009^{c g}
- Cycloptilum contectum (Rehn, J.A.G. & Hebard, 1912)^{c g}
- Cycloptilum crypton Otte, D. & Perez-Gelabert, 2009^{c g}
- Cycloptilum distinctum Hebard, 1931^{c g}
- Cycloptilum distinctus Hebard, 1931^{i}
- Cycloptilum eidalimos Otte, D. & Perez-Gelabert, 2009^{c g}
- Cycloptilum epimonon Otte, D. & Perez-Gelabert, 2009^{c g}
- Cycloptilum erraticum Scudder, S.H., 1893^{c g}
- Cycloptilum eucharistos Otte, D. & Perez-Gelabert, 2009^{c g}
- Cycloptilum eumorphos Otte, D. & Perez-Gelabert, 2009^{c g}
- Cycloptilum eustatiensis Bland & Desutter-Grandcolas, 2003^{c g}
- Cycloptilum exsanguis Love and Walker, 1979^{i c g}
- Cycloptilum halticon Otte, D. & Perez-Gelabert, 2009^{c g}
- Cycloptilum hypoclopon Otte, D. & Perez-Gelabert, 2009^{c g}
- Cycloptilum inops Otte, D. & Perez-Gelabert, 2009^{c g}
- Cycloptilum irregularis Love and Walker, 1979^{i c g}
- Cycloptilum kelainopum Love and Walker, 1979^{i c g}
- Cycloptilum liberum Otte, D. & Perez-Gelabert, 2009^{c g}
- Cycloptilum minimum Caudell, 1922^{c g}
- Cycloptilum nesydrion Otte, D. & Perez-Gelabert, 2009^{c g}
- Cycloptilum occultum Otte, D. & Perez-Gelabert, 2009^{c g}
- Cycloptilum opertanium Otte, D. & Perez-Gelabert, 2009^{c g}
- Cycloptilum oriplanes Otte, D. & Perez-Gelabert, 2009^{c g}
- Cycloptilum panurgon Otte, D. & Perez-Gelabert, 2009^{c g}
- Cycloptilum pigrum Love and Walker, 1979^{i c g}
- Cycloptilum pusillulum Otte, D. & Perez-Gelabert, 2009^{c g}
- Cycloptilum quatrainum Love and Walker, 1979^{i c g}
- Cycloptilum sanum Otte, D. & Perez-Gelabert, 2009^{c g}
- Cycloptilum slossoni (Scudder, 1897)^{i c g b} (Slosson's scaly cricket)
- Cycloptilum spectabile Strohecker, 1939^{i c g}
- Cycloptilum squamosum Scudder, 1869^{i c g b} (Scudder's scaly cricket)
- Cycloptilum tardum Love and Walker, 1979^{i c g}
- Cycloptilum thoracicum Hebard, 1928^{c g}
- Cycloptilum thymicon Otte, D. & Perez-Gelabert, 2009^{c g}
- Cycloptilum tornatilis Otte, D. & Perez-Gelabert, 2009^{c g}
- Cycloptilum trigonipalpum (Rehn & Hebard, 1912)^{i c g b} (forest scaly cricket)
- Cycloptilum velox Love and Walker, 1979^{i c g}
- Cycloptilum zebra (Rehn and Hebard, 1905)^{i c g}

Data sources: i = ITIS, c = Catalogue of Life, g = GBIF, b = Bugguide.net
