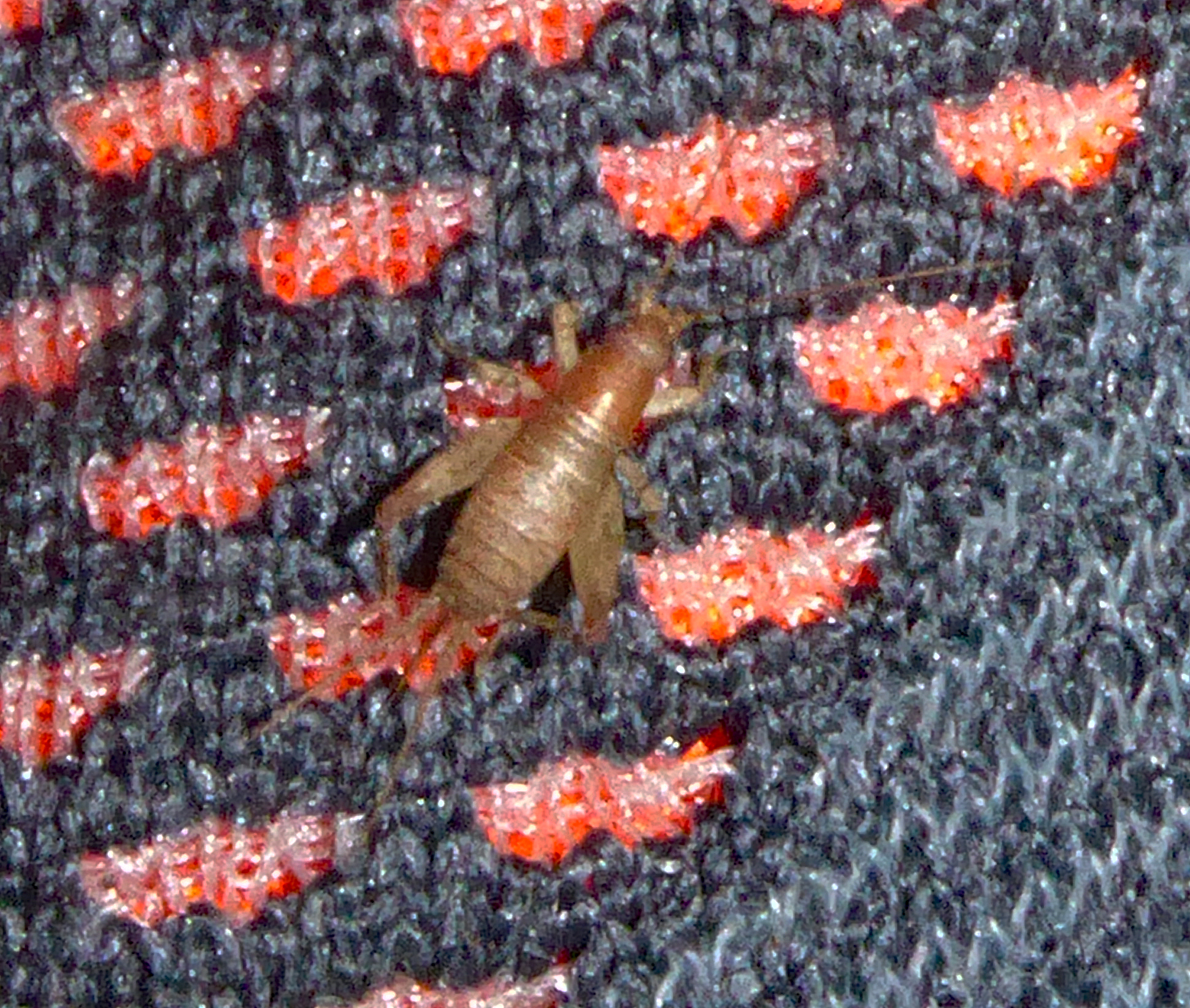
- Ornebius apertus

Scientific classification
- Domain: Eukaryota
- Kingdom: Animalia
- Phylum: Arthropoda
- Class: Insecta
- Order: Orthoptera
- Suborder: Ensifera
- Family: Mogoplistidae
- Subfamily: Mogoplistinae
- Tribe: Arachnocephalini
- Genus: Ornebius; Guérin-Méneville, 1844

Synonyms
- Liphoplus Saussure, 1877

= Ornebius =

Genus of crickets

External image
- Images at iNaturalist

Ornebius is a genus of crickets in the family Mogoplistidae and the tribe Arachnocephalini, erected by Félix Édouard Guérin-Méneville in 1844. Species may be called "common scaled crickets" and have widespread records of distribution, which are discontinuous (and probably incomplete); they include: Africa, Asia, Australia, islands in the Indian and Pacific Oceans, and South America.

== Description ==
Ornebius (at least the Australian species) are >7.5 mm in length. The tegmen posterior margin has either a continuous black or brown band or three darkened areas. The tibiae of the fore and mid legs are banded. The genital processes are brown to pale brown or whitish. In males, the last abdominal segment is not black between the cerci, and the front of the mirror is not hidden beneath the pronotum.

This genus can be divided into at least seven species groups, with other genera currently (2023) incertae sedis. The Australian fauna comprise three of these groups:

- The Abminga Group have the fore and mid leg tibiae unbanded or only faintly banded, the face not strongly banded, the tenth abdominal tergite without tufts of setae, and the forewings with a continuous dark band on the posterior margin and anteriorly with one or three dark spots.
- The Illaroo Group have the fore and mid leg tibiae strongly banded, the face usually with contrasting markings, the tenth abdominal tergite usually with two tufts of setae near its centre, and the forewings usually with two or three dark markings on the posterior margin (with indistinct dark markings scattered over the remainder).
- The Wandella Group have the fore and mid leg tibiae only faintly banded, the face not strongly banded, the tenth abdominal tergite usually with two tufts of setae near its centre, and the forewings usually with two or three dark markings on the posterior margin (with indistinct dark markings scattered over the remainder).

== Species ==
The Orthoptera Species File lists:

species group abminga Otte & Alexander, 1983

1. Ornebius abminga Otte & Alexander, 1983
2. Ornebius coorumbena Otte & Alexander, 1983
3. Ornebius kalara Otte & Alexander, 1983
4. Ornebius karkalo Otte & Alexander, 1983
5. Ornebius nigromaculatus (Chopard, 1925)
6. Ornebius woomba Otte & Alexander, 1983

species group alii Bhowmik, 1970

1. Ornebius alii Bhowmik, 1970
2. Ornebius aureus Ingrisch, 2006
3. Ornebius carnificare He, Zhang & Ma, 2021
4. Ornebius cibodas Ingrisch, 2006
5. Ornebius dowwiangkanae Tan, Dawwrueng & Artchawakom, 2015
6. Ornebius insculptus Tan & Ingrisch, 2013
7. Ornebius peniculatus Ingrisch, 2006
8. Ornebius samudra Ingrisch, 2006
9. Ornebius tuberculatus Ingrisch, 2006

species group flori Ingrisch, 1998

1. Ornebius fastus Yang & Yen, 2001
2. Ornebius flori Ingrisch, 1998
3. Ornebius marginatus Ingrisch, 1998
4. Ornebius pullus Ingrisch, 2006
5. Ornebius xinyao Tan, 2015

species group formosanus (Shiraki, 1911)

1. Ornebius albalatus Tan & Kamaruddin, 2013
2. Ornebius apterus He, 2018
3. Ornebius aurumalas He, Zhang & Ma, 2021
4. Ornebius formosanus (Shiraki, 1911)
5. Ornebius lunam He, Zhang & Ma, 2021
6. Ornebius panda He, 2019
7. Ornebius polycomus He, 2017
8. Ornebius yunnanensis Wang, Zhang & Liu, 2020

species group illaroo Otte & Alexander, 1983

1. Ornebius antakira Otte & Alexander, 1983
2. Ornebius attunga Otte & Alexander, 1983
3. Ornebius baloois Otte & Alexander, 1983
4. Ornebius balumba Otte & Alexander, 1983
5. Ornebius dandiri Otte & Alexander, 1983
6. Ornebius dirkanala Otte & Alexander, 1983
7. Ornebius illaroo Otte & Alexander, 1983
8. Ornebius jatalinga Otte & Alexander, 1983
9. Ornebius jirira Otte & Alexander, 1983
10. Ornebius kapunda Otte & Alexander, 1983
11. Ornebius lilka Otte & Alexander, 1983
12. Ornebius oradala Otte & Alexander, 1983
13. Ornebius yarandilla Otte & Alexander, 1983

species group kanetataki (Matsumura, 1904)

1. Ornebius bimaculatus (Shiraki, 1930)
2. Ornebius bioculatus Tan, Ingrisch, Baroga-Barbecho & Yap, 2019
3. Ornebius citrus Ingrisch, 2006
4. Ornebius fuscicerci (Shiraki, 1930)
5. Ornebius infuscatus (Shiraki, 1930)
6. Ornebius kanetataki (Matsumura, 1904)
7. Ornebius rubidus Ingrisch, 1998
8. Ornebius tampines Tan & Robillard, 2012
9. Ornebius vadus Ingrisch, 1998;species group rufonigrus Ingrisch, 1987
10. Ornebius alvarezi Tan, Ingrisch, Baroga-Barbecho & Yap, 2019
11. Ornebius consternus Ingrisch, 2006
12. Ornebius dumoga Ingrisch, 2006
13. Ornebius lupus Tan, 2022
14. Ornebius rufonigrus Ingrisch, 1987

species group wandella Otte & Alexander, 1983

1. Ornebius allambi Otte & Alexander, 1983
2. Ornebius aperta Otte & Alexander, 1983
3. Ornebius bambara Otte & Alexander, 1983
4. Ornebius coomialla Otte & Alexander, 1983
5. Ornebius curtipalpis Chopard, 1951
6. Ornebius elvalina Otte & Alexander, 1983
7. Ornebius gumbalera Otte & Alexander, 1983
8. Ornebius immarna Otte & Alexander, 1983
9. Ornebius kanya Otte & Alexander, 1983
10. Ornebius wandella Otte & Alexander, 1983

species group not assigned

1. Ornebius abdominalis (Stål, 1877)
2. Ornebius acutus Chopard, 1931
3. Ornebius alatus (Saussure, 1877)
4. Ornebius albipalpus Ingrisch, 2006
5. Ornebius †ambericus Vickery & Poinar, 1994
6. Ornebius angustifrons (Chopard, 1930)
7. Ornebius angustus Ingrisch, 2006
8. Ornebius annulatus (Hebard, 1928)
9. Ornebius barbicornis (Strohecker, 1953)
10. Ornebius bogor Ingrisch, 2006
11. Ornebius brasilianus (Saussure, 1877)
12. Ornebius brevipalpis Chopard, 1930
13. Ornebius brevipalpus Ingrisch, 2006
14. Ornebius brevipennis Chopard, 1931
15. Ornebius cucullatus (Bolívar, 1889)
16. Ornebius cydistos Otte, 2006
17. Ornebius dilatatus (Brancsik, 1901)
18. Ornebius elegantulus Bolívar, 1912
19. Ornebius euryxiphus Chopard, 1958
20. Ornebius fasciatus (Brunner von Wattenwyl, 1893)
21. Ornebius flavipalpis (Kirby, 1900)
22. Ornebius fuscipennis (Chopard, 1929)
23. Ornebius guerini (Bolívar, 1900)
24. Ornebius guerinianus (Saussure, 1877)
25. Ornebius howensis Chopard, 1951
26. Ornebius imitatus Ingrisch, 2006
27. Ornebius karnyi Chopard, 1929
28. Ornebius komodensis Bey-Bienko, 1966
29. Ornebius leai Chopard, 1951
30. Ornebius lepismoides (McNeill, 1901)
31. Ornebius longicaudus (Saussure, 1877)
32. Ornebius longipennis (Shiraki, 1930)
33. Ornebius luteicercis Chopard, 1957
34. Ornebius medius (Hebard, 1928)
35. Ornebius mexicanus (Saussure, 1897)
36. Ornebius minusculus (Chopard, 1929)
37. Ornebius nigrifrons Chopard, 1969
38. Ornebius nigripalpis Guérin-Méneville, 1844
39. Ornebius nigripennis (Chopard, 1929)
40. Ornebius nigripes Chopard, 1927
41. Ornebius nigrirostris Chopard, 1969
42. Ornebius noumeensis (Bolívar, 1882)
43. Ornebius novarae (Saussure, 1877)
44. Ornebius obscuripennis (Chopard, 1930)
45. Ornebius occultus (Saussure, 1877)
46. Ornebius pendleburyi Chopard, 1969
47. Ornebius peruviensis Chopard, 1913
48. Ornebius robustus (Hebard, 1925)
49. Ornebius rotundatus Chopard, 1931
50. Ornebius scotops (Hebard, 1928)
51. Ornebius serratus Ingrisch, 2006
52. Ornebius stenus Gorochov, 1994
53. Ornebius succineus Bolívar, 1912
54. Ornebius syrticus Bolívar, 1912
55. Ornebius testaceus Chopard, 1913
56. Ornebius unmadacitra Fernando, 1958
57. Ornebius validus (Bolívar, 1895)
58. Ornebius varipennis Chopard, 1936
59. Ornebius xanthopterus Guérin-Méneville, 1844 - type species (by subsequent designation)
