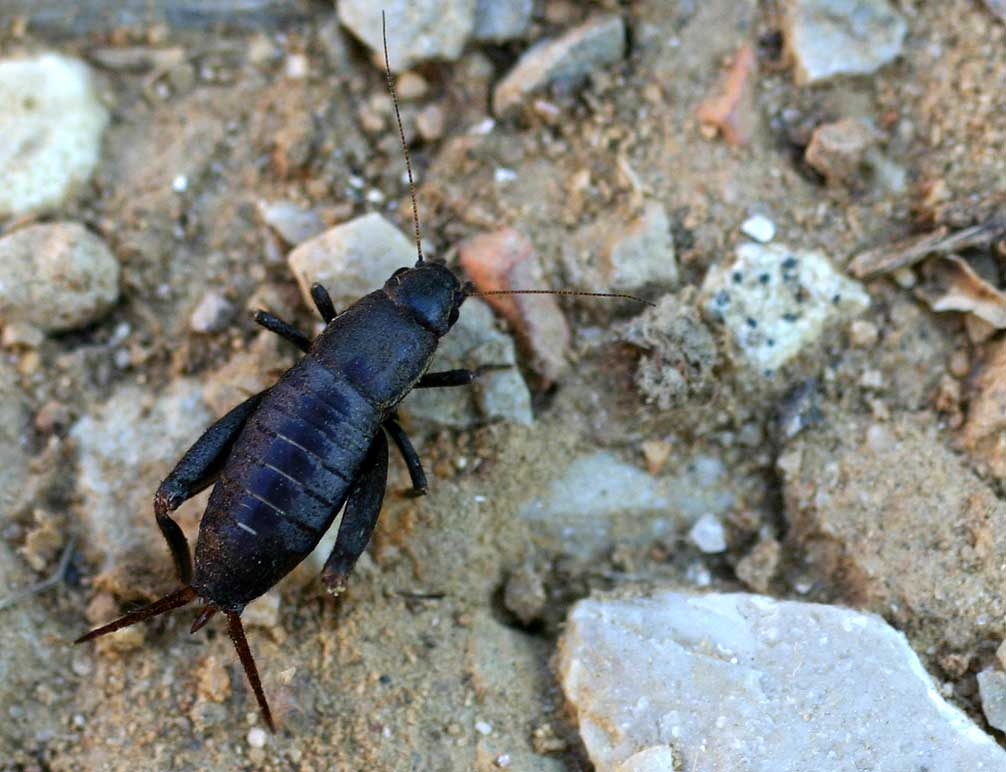
- Mogoplistes brunneus

Scientific classification
- Kingdom: Animalia
- Phylum: Arthropoda
- Clade: Pancrustacea
- Class: Insecta
- Order: Orthoptera
- Suborder: Ensifera
- Superfamily: Grylloidea
- Family: Mogoplistidae; Brunner von Wattenwyl, 1873

Subfamilies and Tribes
- See text

Synonyms
- Mogoplistoidea Brunner von Wattenwyl, 1873; Malgasiidae Gorochov, 1984; Mogoplistii Brunner von Wattenwyl, 1873

= Mogoplistidae =

Mogoplistidae Temporal range: Cenomanian–Recent

Family of crickets

Mogoplistidae is a family of scaly crickets and allies within the superfamily Grylloidea. Considered to be monophyletic, a sister taxon to the Gryllidae crickets. This family consists of more than 370 species worldwide; 20 species in 4 genera occur in North America and this family includes the scaly crickets of Europe.

== Subfamilies, Tribes and selected Genera ==
The Orthoptera Species File lists the following:

=== Malgasiinae ===
Auth.: Gorochov 1984; distribution: Madagascar and Indian Ocean islands

- Malgasia Uvarov, 1940

=== Mogoplistinae ===
Auth.: Brunner von Wattenwyl 1873

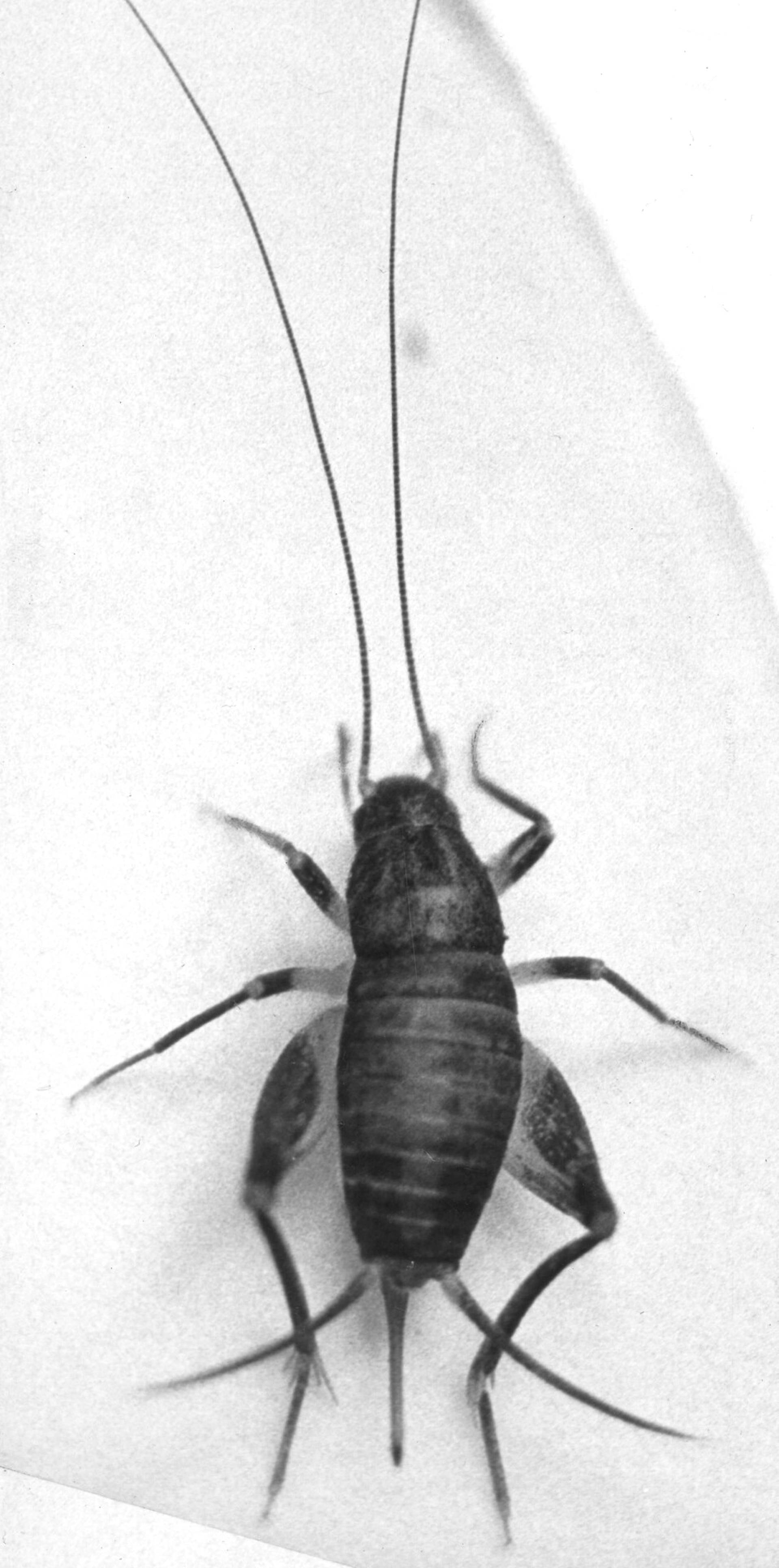
Cycloptiloides orientalis

tribe Arachnocephalini Gorochov 1984

1. Apterornebius Ingrisch, 2006
2. Arachnocephalus Costa, 1855
3. Bothromogoplistes Gorochov, 2020
4. Cycloptiloides Sjöstedt, 1909
5. Cycloptilum Scudder, 1869
6. Discophallus Gorochov, 2009
7. Ectatoderus Guérin-Méneville, 1847
8. Ornebius Guérin-Méneville, 1844
9. Pseudomogoplistes Gorochov, 1984
10. †Archornebius Gorochov, 2010
11. †Pseudarachnocephalus Gorochov, 2010

tribe Mogoplistini Brunner von Wattenwyl 1873

1. Biama Otte & Alexander, 1983
2. Collendina Otte & Alexander, 1983
3. Derectaotus Chopard, 1936
4. Eucycloptilum Chopard, 1935
5. Gotvendia Bolívar, 1927
6. Hoplosphyrum Rehn & Hebard, 1912
7. Kalyra Otte & Alexander, 1983
8. Kiah Otte & Alexander, 1983
9. Marinna Otte & Alexander, 1983
10. Microgryllus Philippi, 1863
11. Micrornebius Chopard, 1969
12. Mogoplistes Serville, 1838
13. Musgravia Otte, 1994
14. Oligacanthopus Rehn & Hebard, 1912
15. Pachyornebius Chopard, 1969
16. Paramogoplistes Gorochov, 1984
17. Pongah Otte & Alexander, 1983
18. Talia Otte & Alexander, 1983
19. Terraplistes Ingrisch, 2006
20. Tubarama Yamasaki, 1985
21. Yarabina Otte, 1994

=== †Protomogoplistinae ===
- †Protomogoplistes Gorochov, 2010 Burmese amber, Myanmar, Cenomanian

== Ecology ==
These crickets have a worldwide distribution: especially in tropical/subtropical environments near water. Like many other crickets, they are omnivorous scavengers and will eat fungi, plant material, and other insects. Members of this family are distinguished from closely related families by the scales that covers their abdomen and parts of their thorax and resemble those of Lepidoptera.

== History ==
The family was originally described by Brunner von Wattenwyl in 1873, but a genus (mogoplistes) was described earlier, 1838, by Serville and was the basis for the family nomenclature. Mogoplistidae has three subfamilies: Mogoplistinae, Malgasiinae and Protomogoplistinae. Little work has been completed to classify and describe these crickets although work has been done on their acoustic development and identification of new characters.
