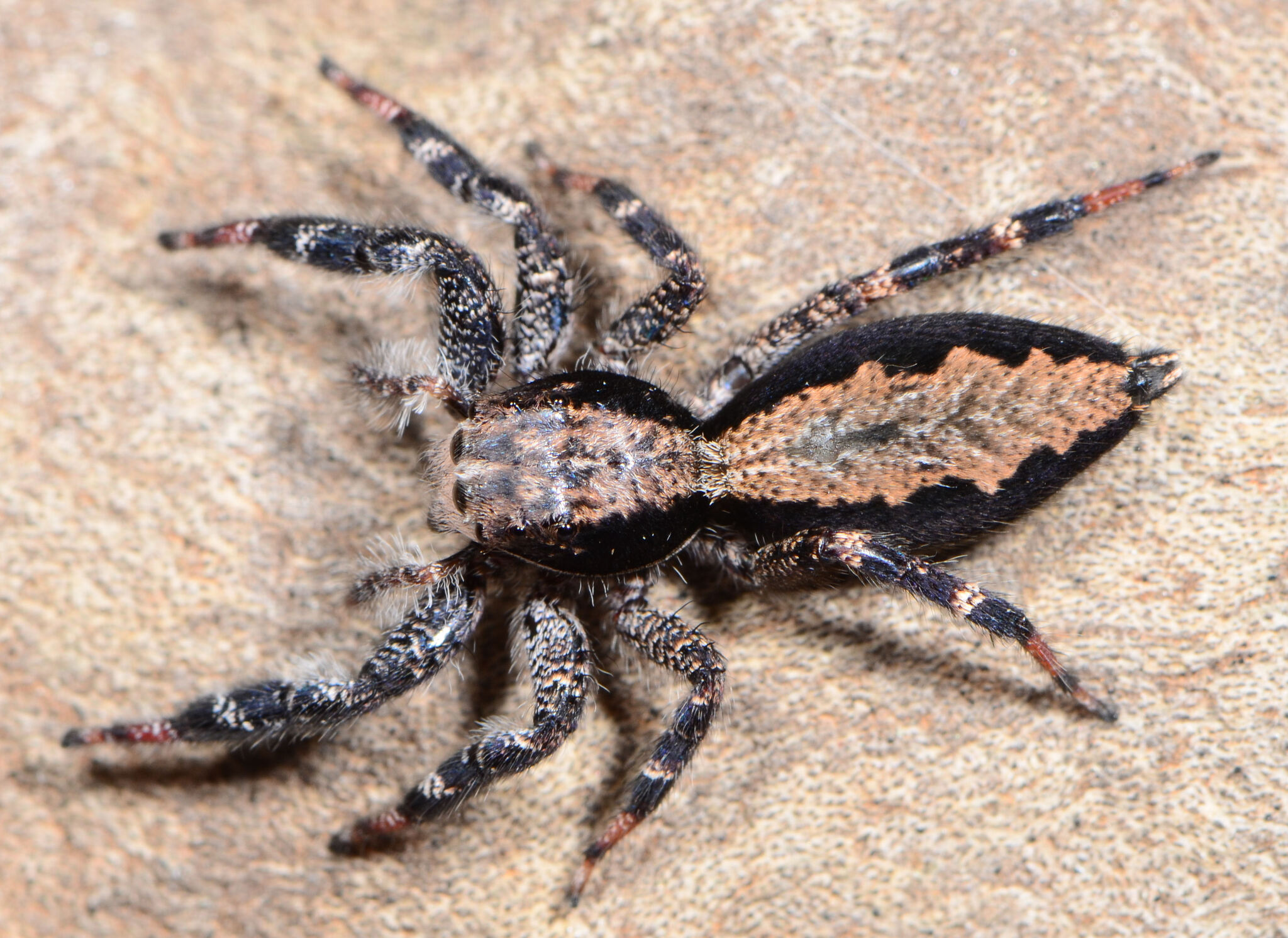
- female
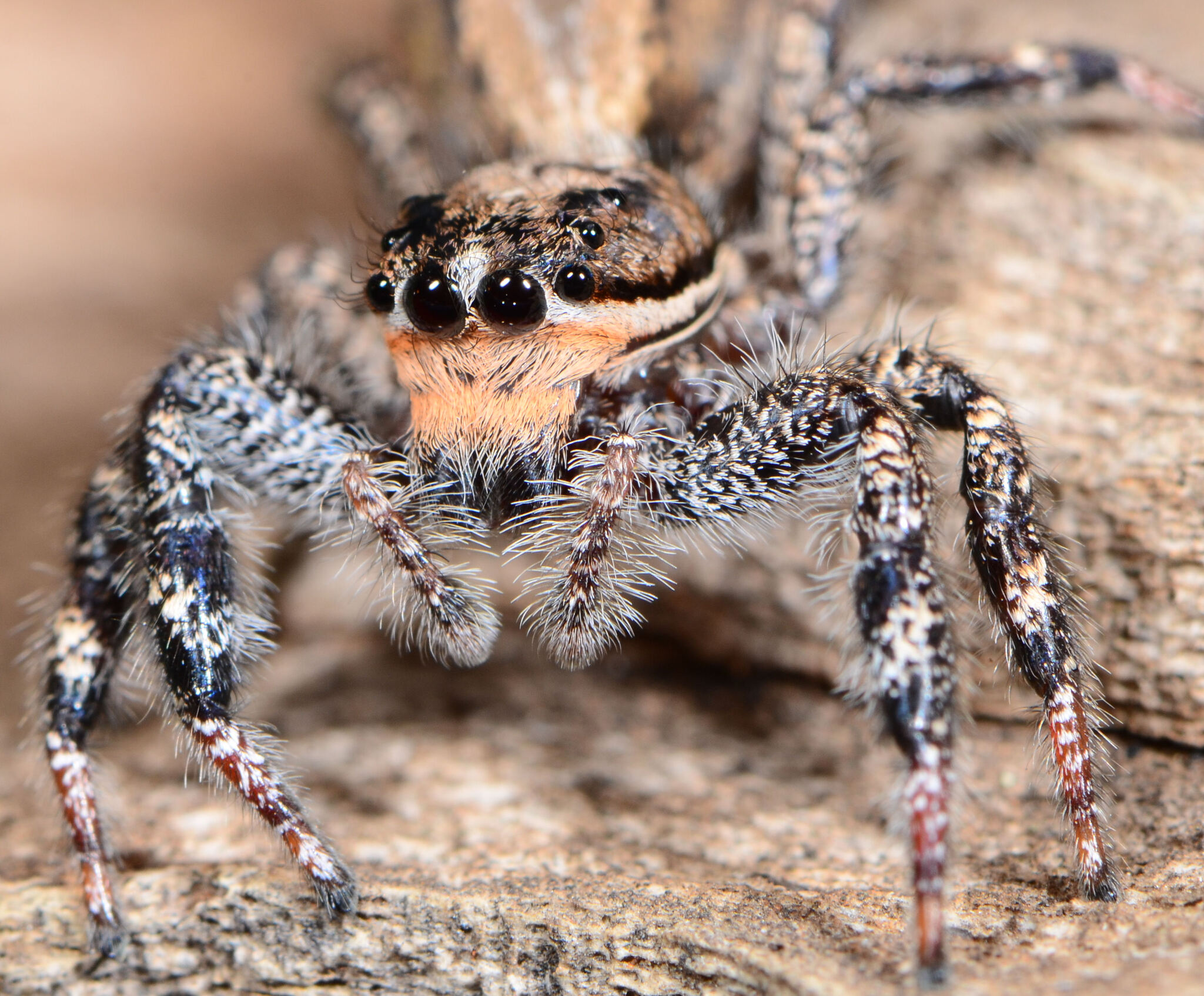
- female

Scientific classification
- Kingdom: Animalia
- Phylum: Arthropoda
- Subphylum: Chelicerata
- Class: Arachnida
- Order: Araneae
- Infraorder: Araneomorphae
- Family: Salticidae
- Genus: Holcolaetis
- Species: H. zuluensis

Binomial name
- Holcolaetis zuluensis Lawrence, 1937

= Holcolaetis zuluensis =

Zululand Holcolaetis Jumping Spider

Species of spider

Holcolaetis zuluensis is a species of jumping spider in the family Salticidae. It is found in several African countries and is commonly known as the Zululand Holcolaetis jumping spider.

== Distribution ==
Holcolaetis zuluensis is found in Kenya, Tanzania, Mozambique, and South Africa. Within South Africa, it is known from Gauteng, KwaZulu-Natal, Limpopo, and Mpumalanga.

== Habitat and ecology ==
The species is frequently associated with bark. In Ndumo Game Reserve, it was sampled from fever tree bark. The species has been sampled from the Forest, Indian Ocean Coastal Belt, Grassland and Savanna biomes at altitudes ranging from 4 to 1427 m.

Both sexes have flattened bodies that enable them to crawl into narrow crevices and under bark.

Egg sacs are constructed under bark either on the inner bark surface or on the tree trunk.

== Description ==
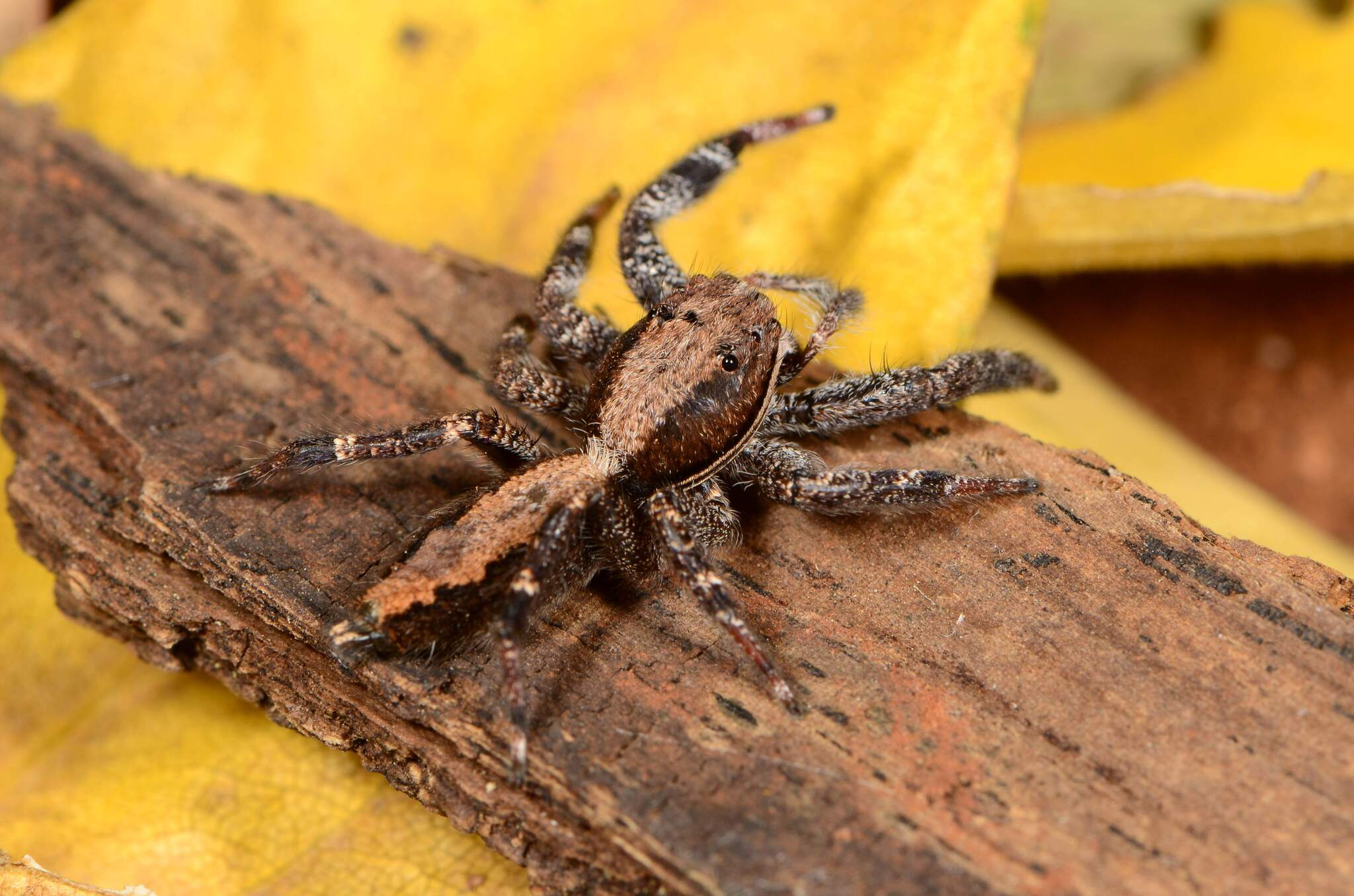
female

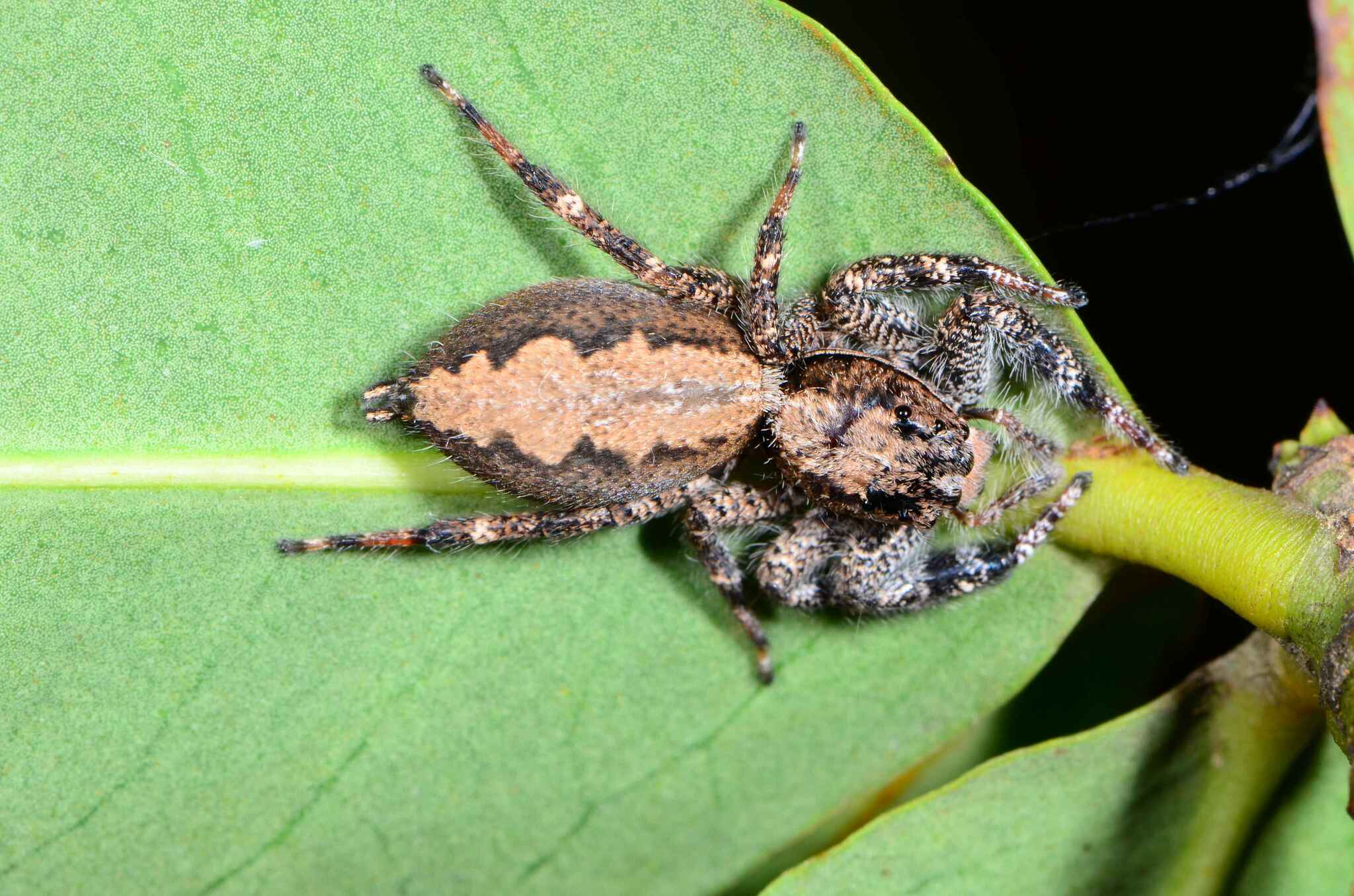
female

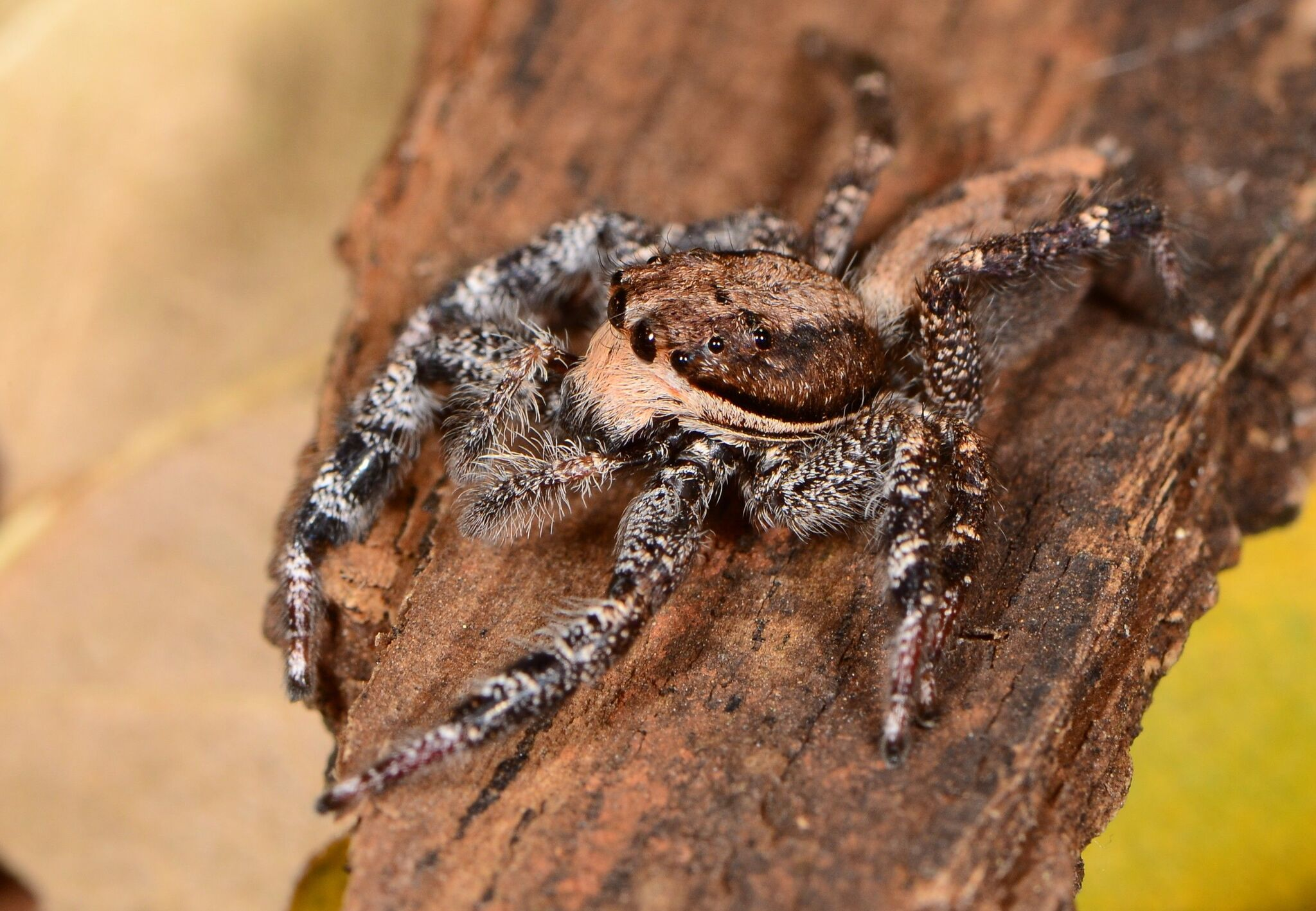
female

== Conservation ==
Holcolaetis zuluensis is listed as of Least Concern by the South African National Biodiversity Institute due to its wide geographical range. There are no known threats to the species. In South Africa, it has been recorded from eight protected areas.

== Taxonomy ==
The female of Holcolaetis zuluensis was described by Lawrence in 1937 from Kosi Bay Nature Reserve in South Africa. Additional information was added by Wesołowska and Haddad in 2009.
