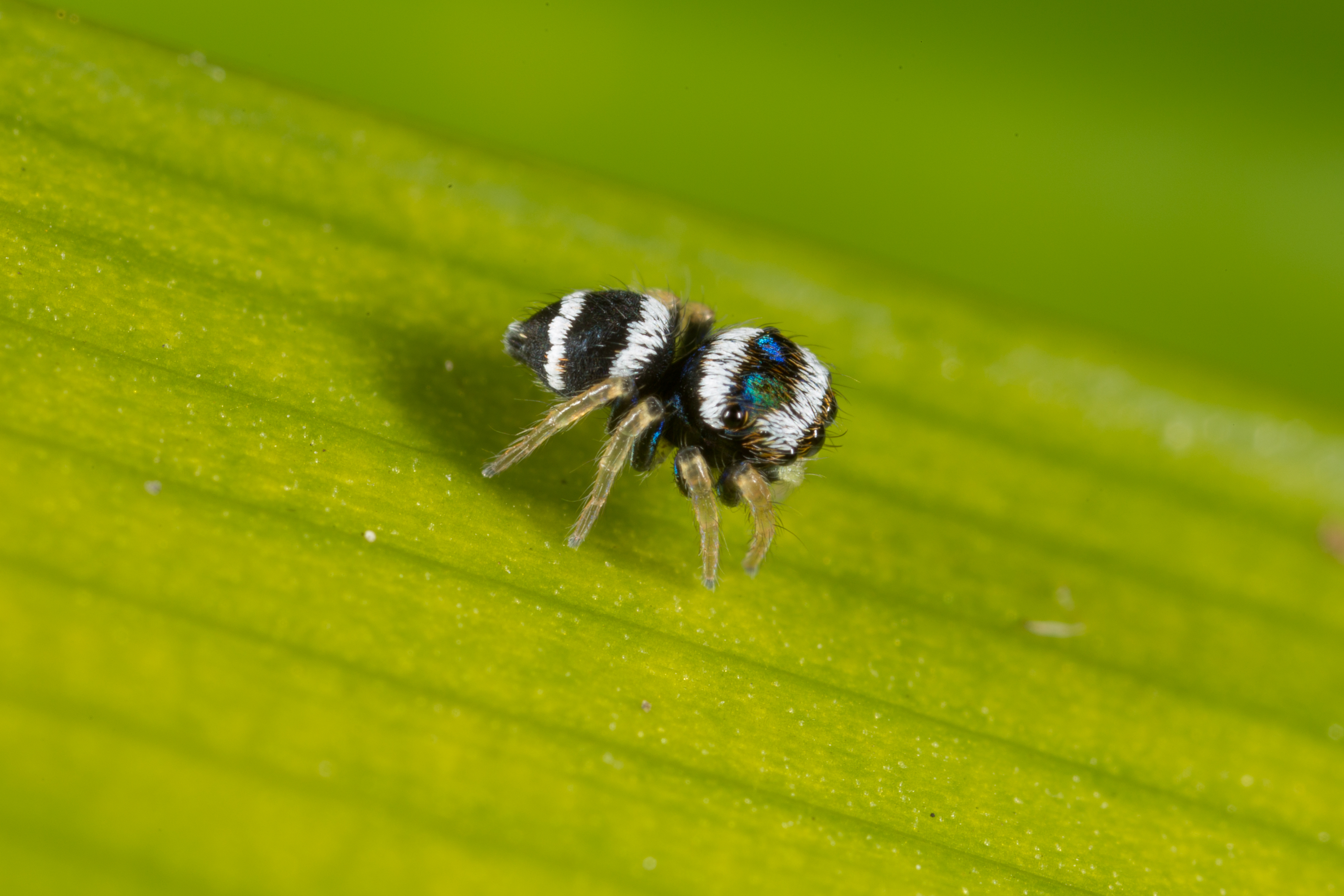
- Euryattus bleekeri

Scientific classification
- Kingdom: Animalia
- Phylum: Arthropoda
- Subphylum: Chelicerata
- Class: Arachnida
- Order: Araneae
- Infraorder: Araneomorphae
- Family: Salticidae
- Subfamily: Salticinae
- Genus: Euryattus; Thorell, 1881

Type species
- Euryattus porcellus Thorell, 1881

Species
- See text.

Diversity
- 14 species

Synonyms
- Plotius Simon, 1902

= Euryattus =

Genus of spiders

Euryattus is a genus of spiders in the family Salticidae (jumping spiders).

Like Holcolaetis and Thiania bhamoensis, these spiders build a flat, densely woven egg sac that is not contiguous with the silk of the nest. Euryattus posits the egg sac in rolled up leaves, similar to T. bhamoensis, which is in the same subfamily and stitches two leaves together.

== Etymology ==
The genus name is a compound of Ancient Greek eury "wide" and the common salticid ending -attus.

== Species ==
As of March 2017, the World Spider Catalog accepted the following species:

- Euryattus bleekeri (Doleschall, 1859) – Sri Lanka to Queensland
- Euryattus breviusculus (Simon, 1902) – Sri Lanka
- Euryattus celebensis (Merian, 1911) – Sulawesi
- Euryattus junxiae Prószyński & Deeleman-Reinhold, 2010 – Sumbawa
- Euryattus kinabalus Prószyński & Deeleman-Reinhold, 2013 – Borneo
- Euryattus koomeni Prószyński & Deeleman-Reinhold, 2013 – Borneo
- Euryattus leopoldi (Roewer, 1938) – New Guinea, Aru Islands
- Euryattus myiopotami (Thorell, 1881) – New Guinea
- Euryattus pengi Prószyński & Deeleman-Reinhold, 2013 – Borneo
- Euryattus porcellus Thorell, 1881 – New Guinea
- Euryattus pumilio (Keyserling, 1881) – Queensland
- Euryattus ventralis Prószyński & Deeleman-Reinhold, 2013 – New Guinea
- Euryattus venustus (Doleschall, 1859) – Amboina, New Guinea
- Euryattus wallacei (Thorell, 1881) – Queensland
