= Euryattus breviusculus =

Scientific classification
- Kingdom: Animalia
- Phylum: Arthropoda
- Subphylum: Chelicerata
- Class: Arachnida
- Order: Araneae
- Infraorder: Araneomorphae
- Family: Salticidae
- Genus: Euryattus
- Species: E. breviusculus

Binomial name
- Euryattus breviusculus (Simon, 1902)

Synonyms
- Plotius breviusculus Simon, 1902

Species of spider

Euryattus breviusculus, is a species of spider of the genus Euryattus. It is endemic to Sri Lanka.
