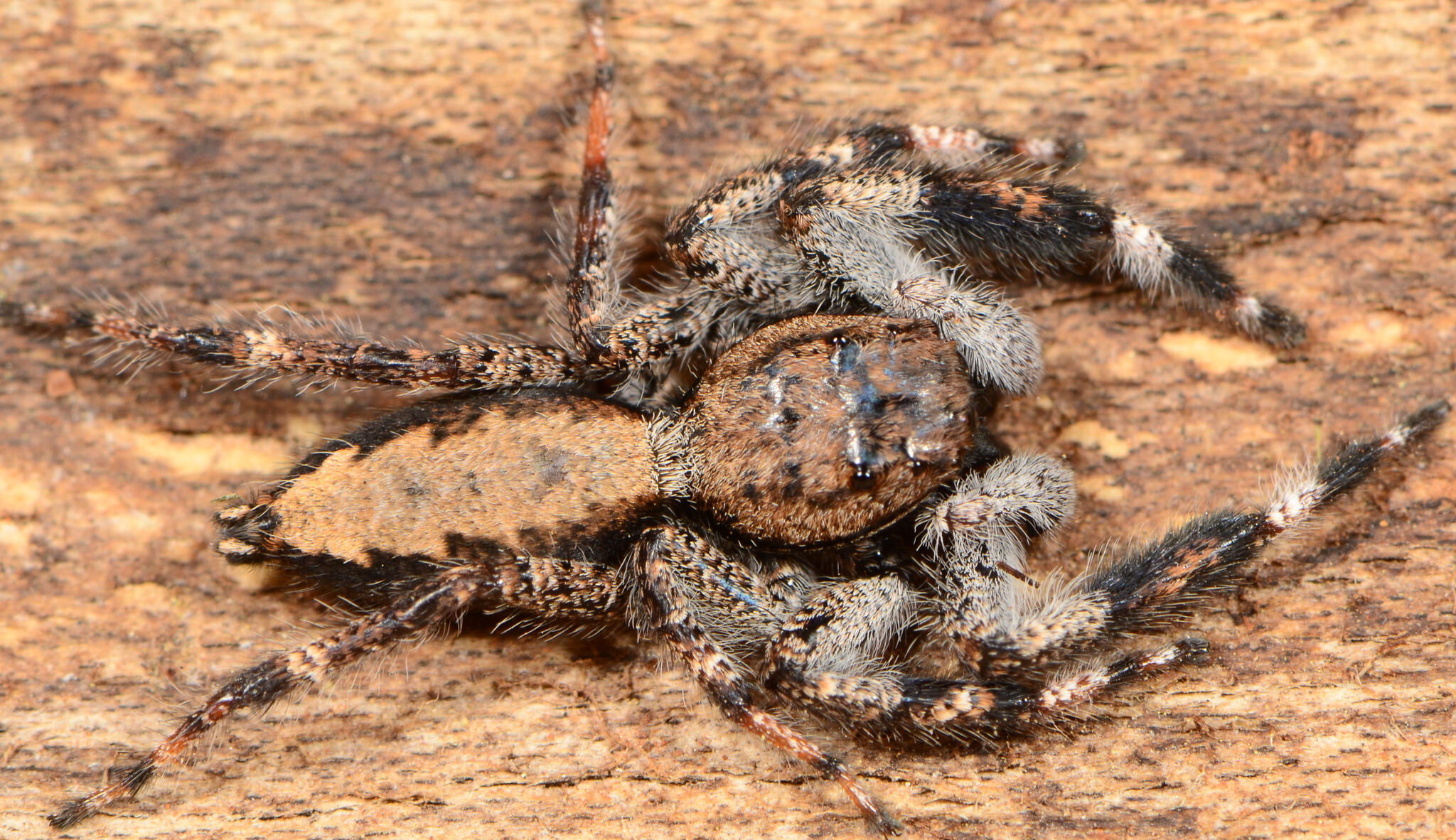
- male
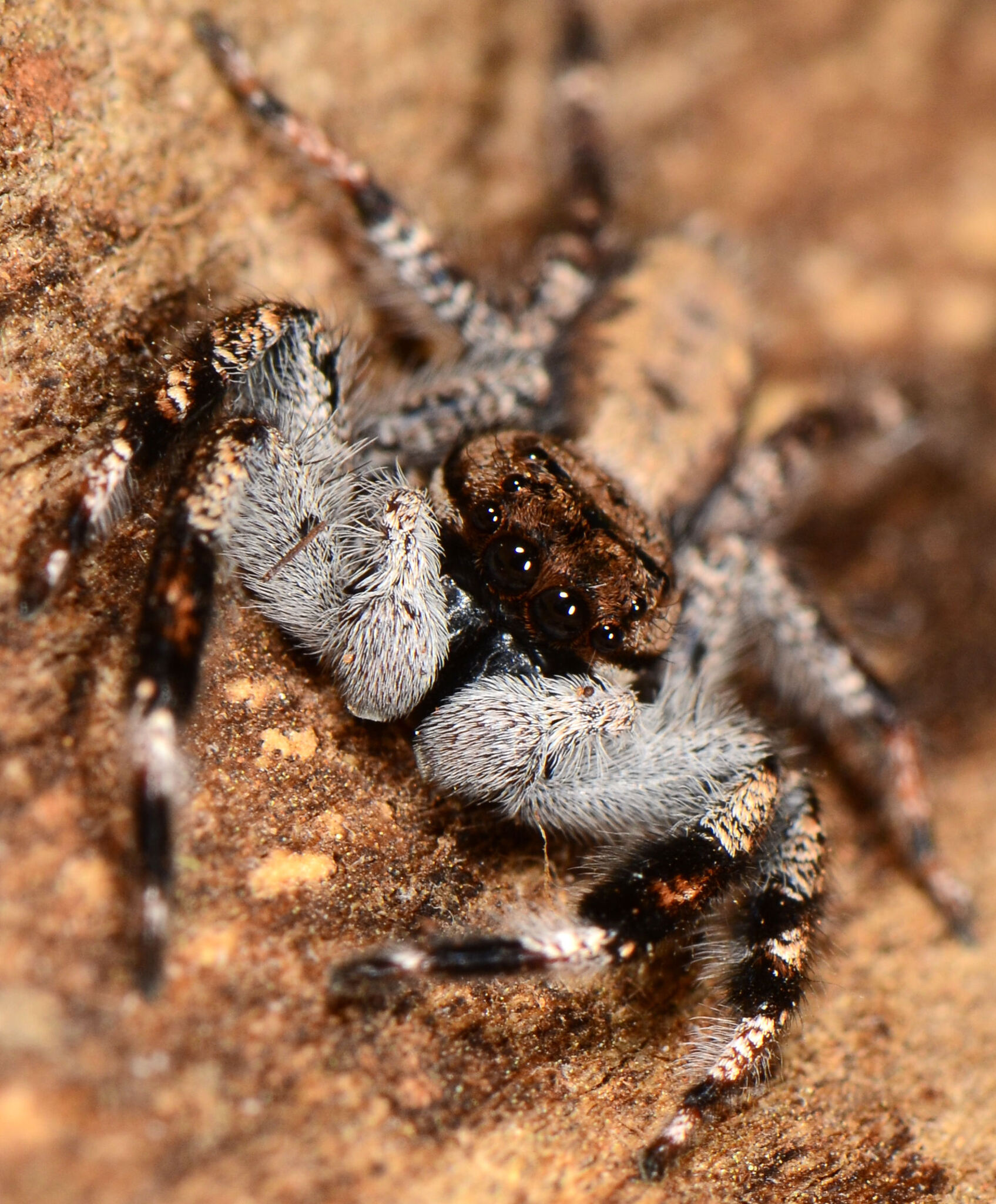
- male

Scientific classification
- Kingdom: Animalia
- Phylum: Arthropoda
- Subphylum: Chelicerata
- Class: Arachnida
- Order: Araneae
- Infraorder: Araneomorphae
- Family: Salticidae
- Genus: Holcolaetis
- Species: H. vellerea

Binomial name
- Holcolaetis vellerea Simon, 1909

Synonyms
- Holcolaetis vidua Lessert, 1927; Holcolaetis camerunensis Roewer, 1965

= Holcolaetis vellerea =

Species of spider

Holcolaetis vellerea is a species of jumping spider in the family Salticidae. It is found in several African countries as well as Yemen.

== Distribution ==
Holcolaetis vellerea is found in Ivory Coast, Cameroon, Equatorial Guinea (São Tomé), Democratic Republic of the Congo, Uganda, Rwanda, Kenya, Angola, Zimbabwe, Mozambique, South Africa, and Yemen.

Within South Africa, it is known from Limpopo and Gauteng.

== Habitat and ecology ==
Specimens are known from different habitats and have been sighted on tree trunks and walls, where they live among loose bricks or rubble. The species has been sampled from the Grassland and Savanna biomes at altitudes ranging from 1119 to 1412 m.

== Description ==
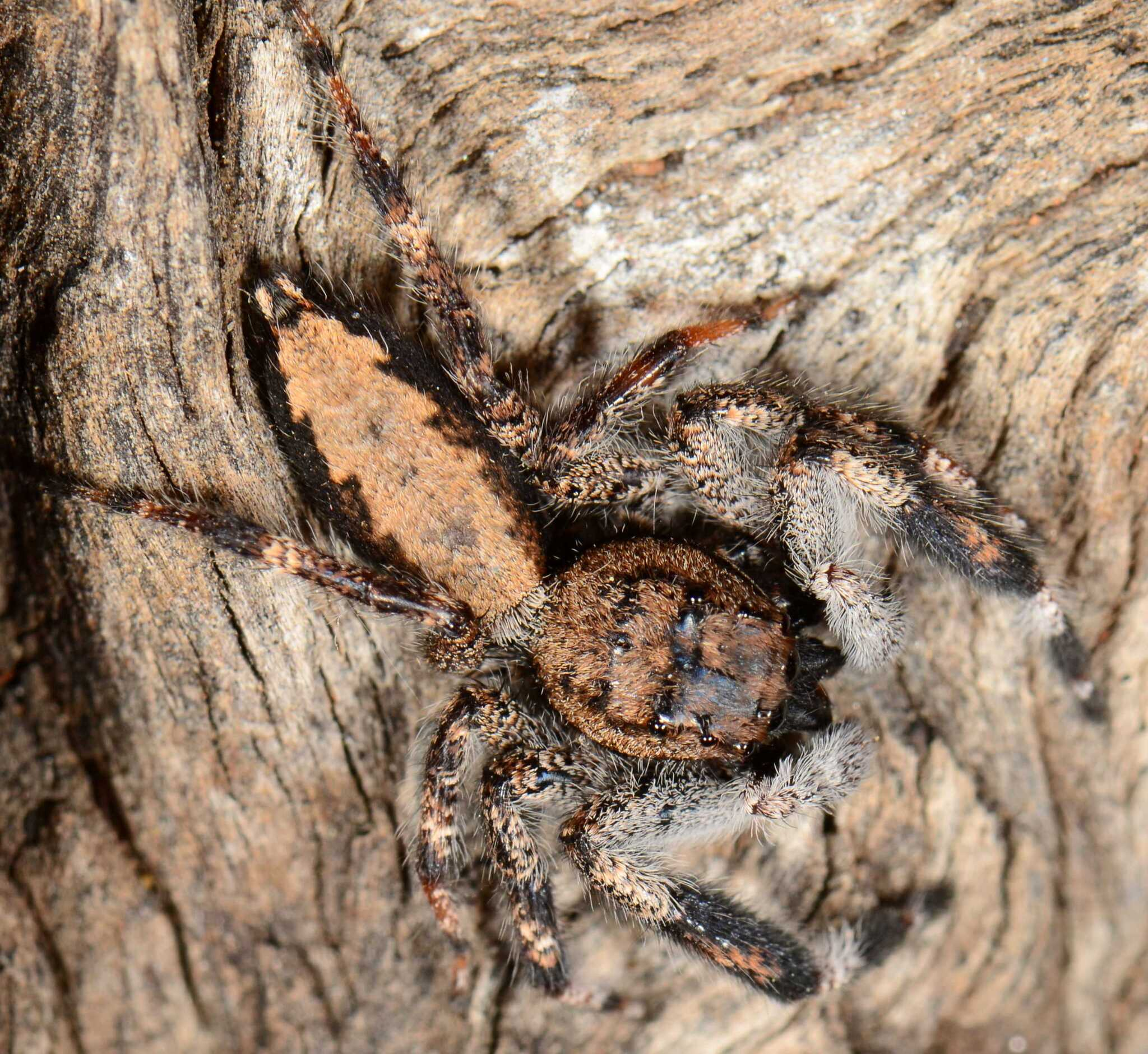

== Conservation ==
Holcolaetis vellerea is listed as of Least Concern by the South African National Biodiversity Institute due to its wide geographical range. There are no known threats to the species. In South Africa, it is protected at the Acacia Lodge Game Reserve and Pretoria National Botanical Garden.

== Taxonomy ==
Holcolaetis vellerea was described by Simon in 1909 from São Tomé. The species was redescribed by Wesołowska and Cumming in 2008.
