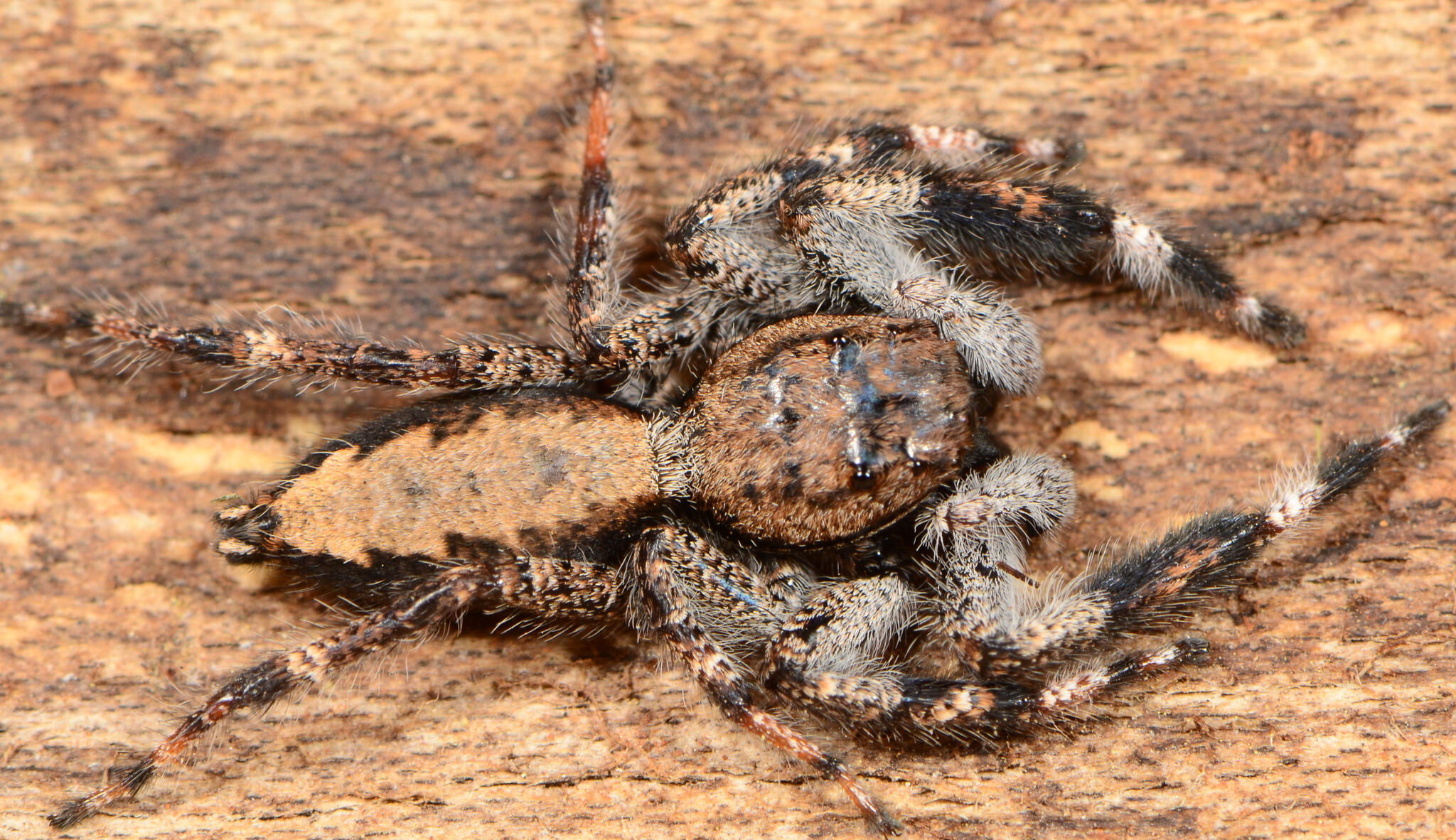
- male H. vellerea
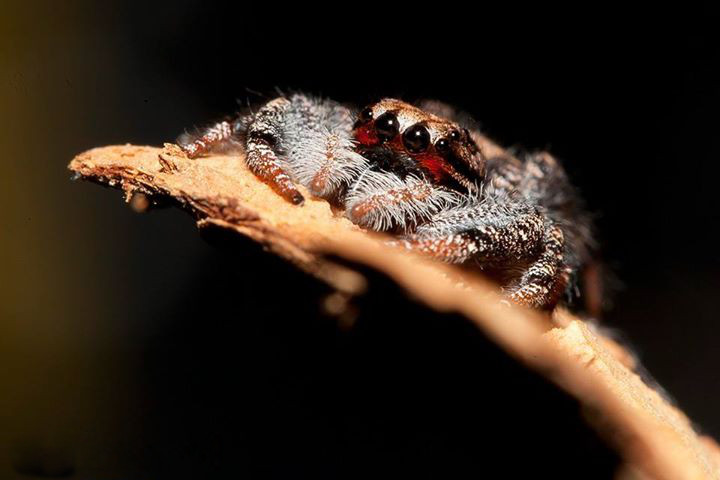
- Unknown species of Holcolaetis

Scientific classification
- Kingdom: Animalia
- Phylum: Arthropoda
- Subphylum: Chelicerata
- Class: Arachnida
- Order: Araneae
- Infraorder: Araneomorphae
- Family: Salticidae
- Subfamily: Spartaeinae
- Genus: Holcolaetis; Simon, 1886

Type species
- Holcolaetis xerampelina Simon, 1886

Species
- See text.

= Holcolaetis =

Genus of spiders

Holcolaetis is a genus of the spider family Salticidae (jumping spiders).

Like Euryattus and Thiania bhamoensis, these spiders build a flat, densely woven egg sac that is not contiguous with the silk of the nest. Holcolaetis posits the egg sac on the trunks of trees.

== Species ==
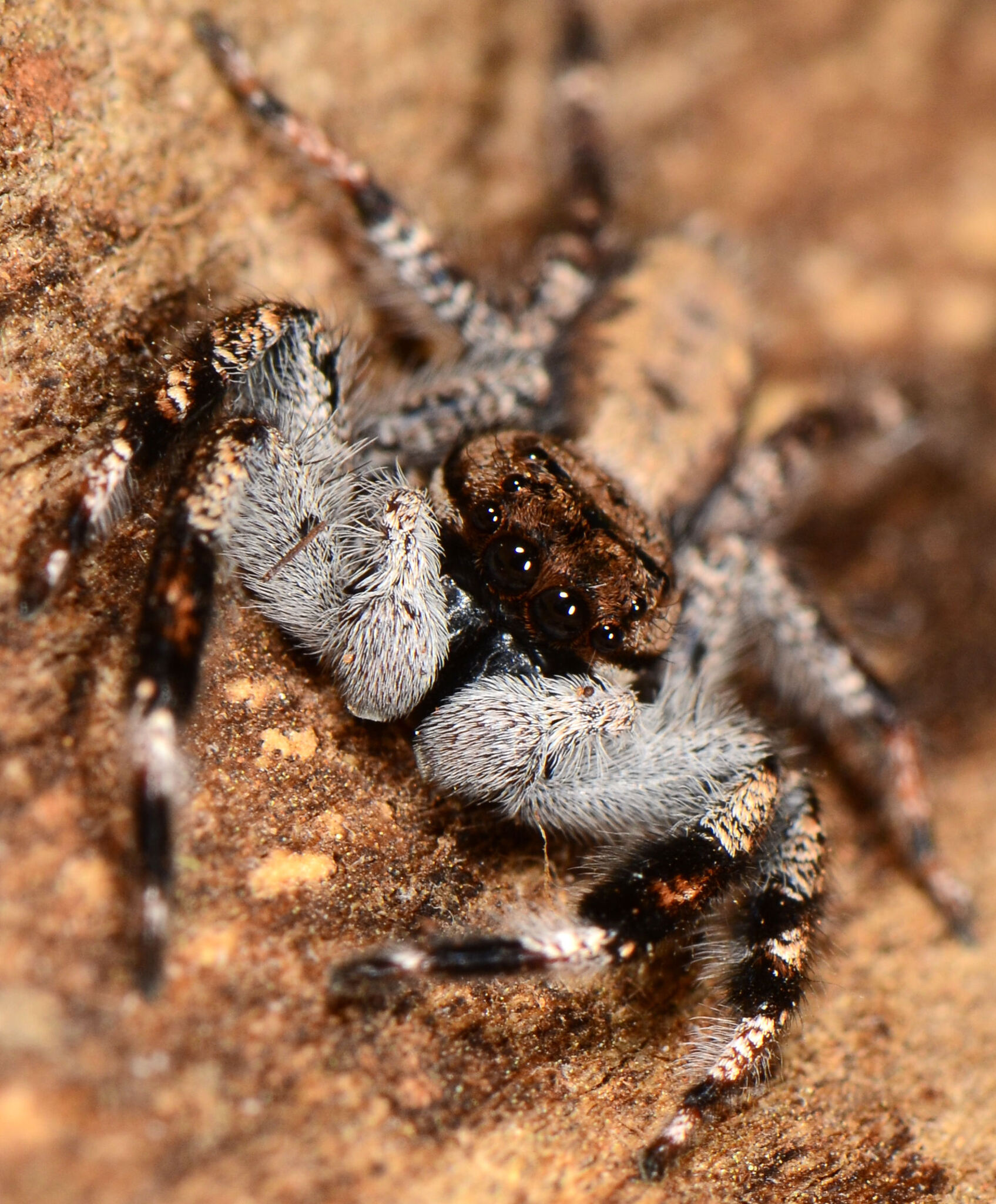
male H. vellerea

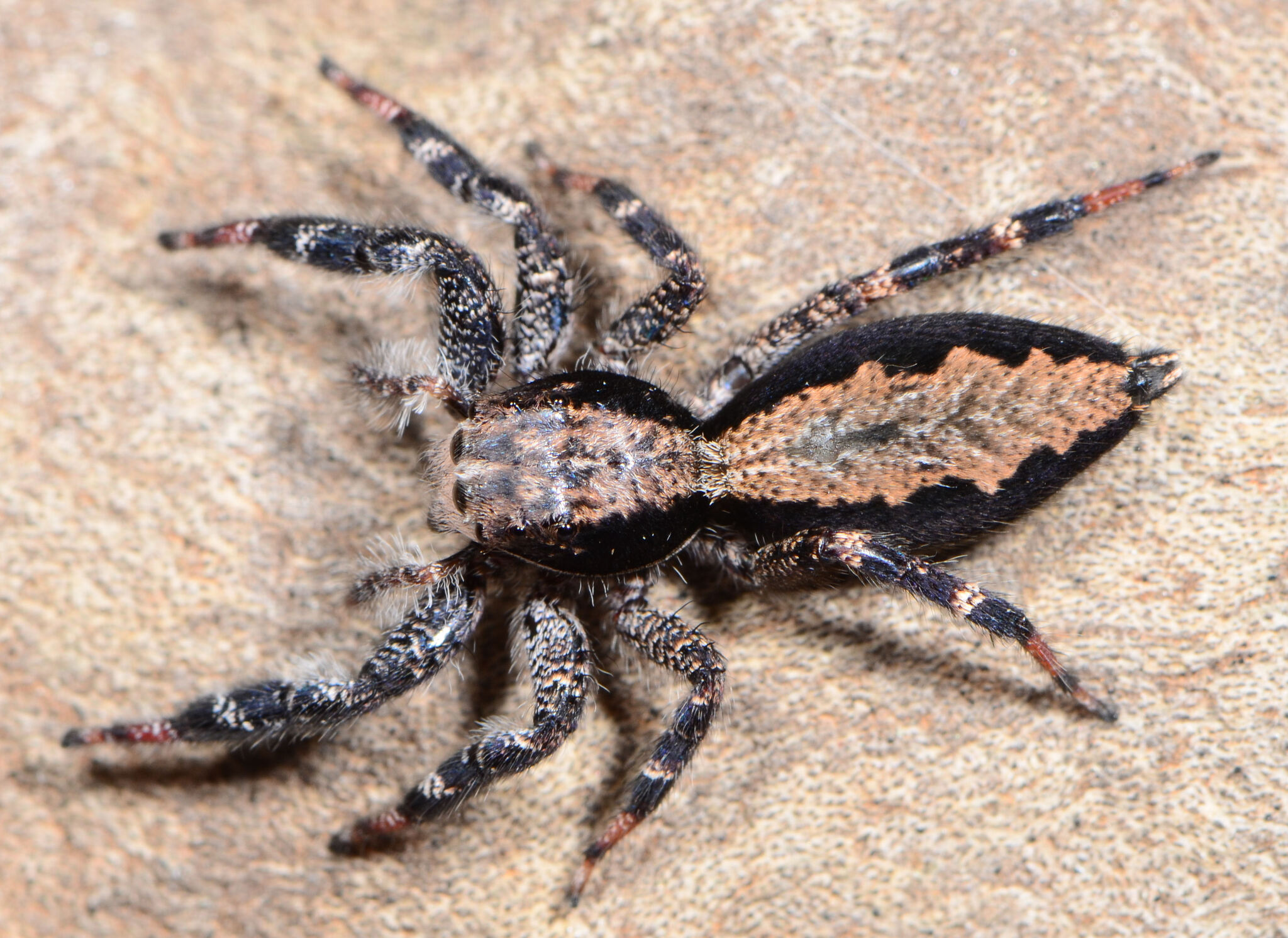
female H. zuluensis

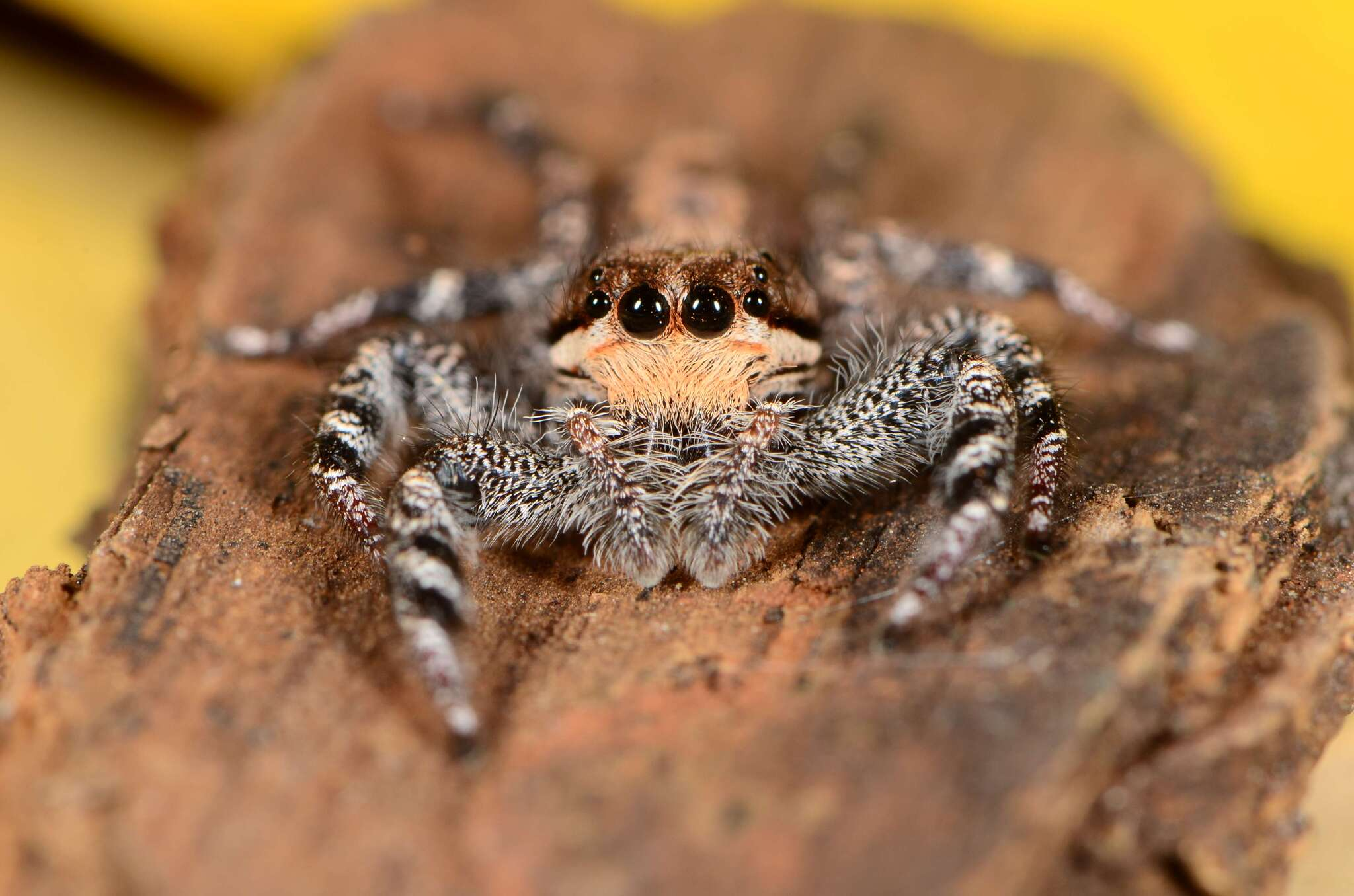
female H. zuluensis

As of October 2025, this genus includes eight species:

- Holcolaetis albobarbata Simon, 1909 – West, Central Africa
- Holcolaetis clarki Wanless, 1985 – West, Central Africa
- Holcolaetis cothurnata (Gerstaecker, 1873) – Tanzania (Zanzibar)
- Holcolaetis spatulata Wawer & Wesołowska, 2025 – Ghana
- Holcolaetis strandi Caporiacco, 1940 – Ethiopia
- Holcolaetis vellerea Simon, 1909 – Ivory Coast, Cameroon, Sao Tome, DR Congo, Uganda, Rwanda, Kenya, Angola, Zimbabwe, Mozambique, South Africa, Yemen
- Holcolaetis xerampelina Simon, 1886 – Malawi, Zambia, Tanzania, Zimbabwe (type species)
- Holcolaetis zuluensis Lawrence, 1937 – Kenya, Tanzania, Mozambique, South Africa
