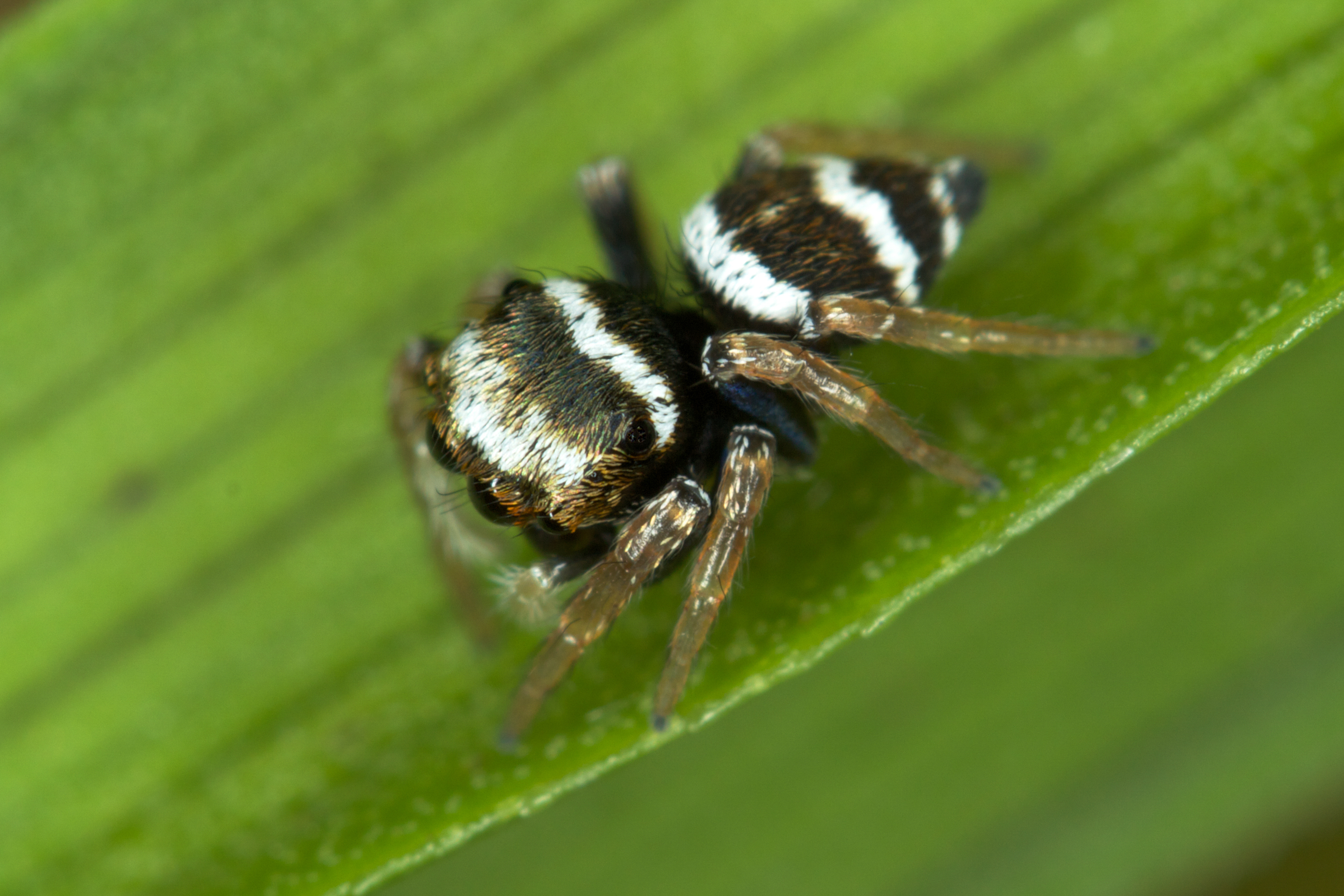
- Female

Scientific classification
- Kingdom: Animalia
- Phylum: Arthropoda
- Subphylum: Chelicerata
- Class: Arachnida
- Order: Araneae
- Infraorder: Araneomorphae
- Family: Salticidae
- Genus: Euryattus
- Species: E. bleekeri

Binomial name
- Euryattus bleekeri (Doleschall, 1859)

Synonyms
- Salticus bleekeri Doleschall, 1859

= Euryattus bleekeri =

Bleeker's jumping spider

Species of spider

Euryattus bleekeri, known as Bleeker's jumping spider, is a species of spider in the family Salticidae (jumping spiders). It is found from Sri Lanka to Queensland.

== Description ==
The male is smaller than the female, being generally about 6 mm in total length, whereas female is 12 mm. The adult mature spider has flat-fronted smooth dark black chelicerae and more black or orange opisthosoma. The female has less vivid coloration than the male, but with prominent orange markings on opisthosoma. Juvenile males are often more orange-brown than adults. Both male and female possess a whitish scaly band around the rear part of the carapace and the leading edge of the abdomen.

== Ecology ==
They do not form a web to capture prey. Bleeker's jumping spider builds a flat, densely woven egg sac and places it near the nest and in rolled up leaves. Their common habitats include dense shrubs and complex vines around coastal areas or near water courses.

== Toxicity ==
There are no records of bites causing serious harm to humans but they may sometimes cause local pain and inflammation.

== Gallery ==
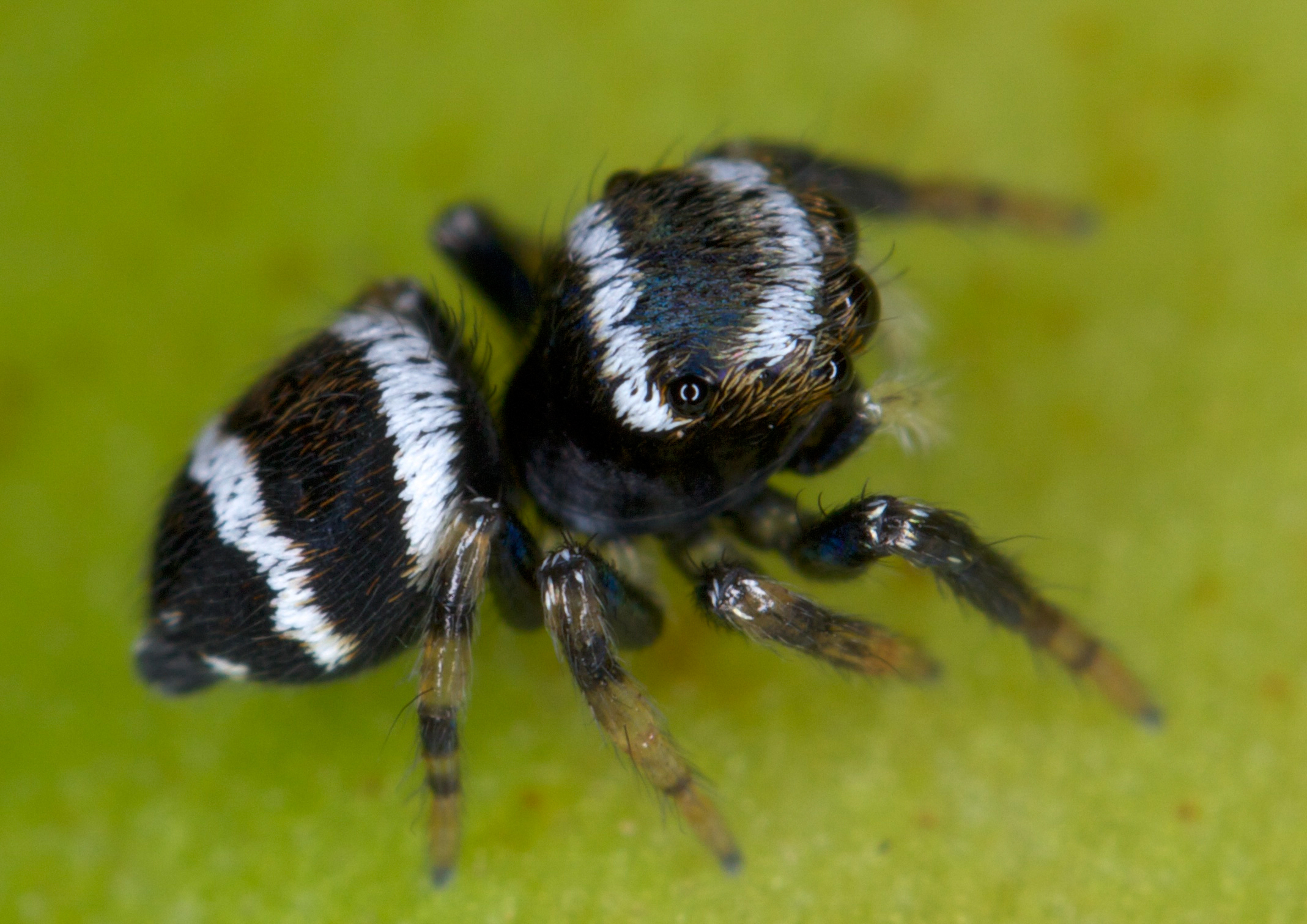
Female; note the white stripes of opisthosoma.

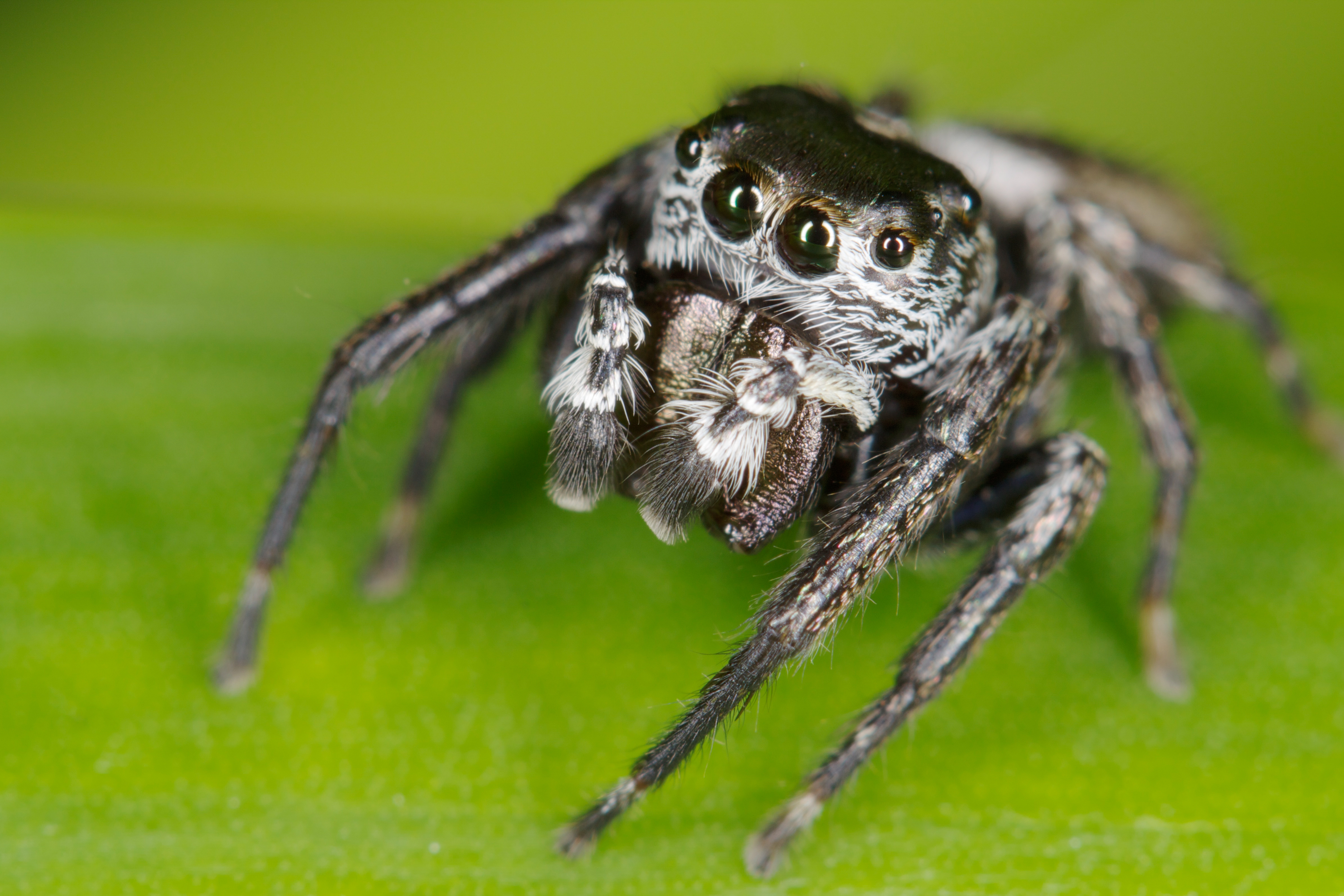
Chelicerae of a male

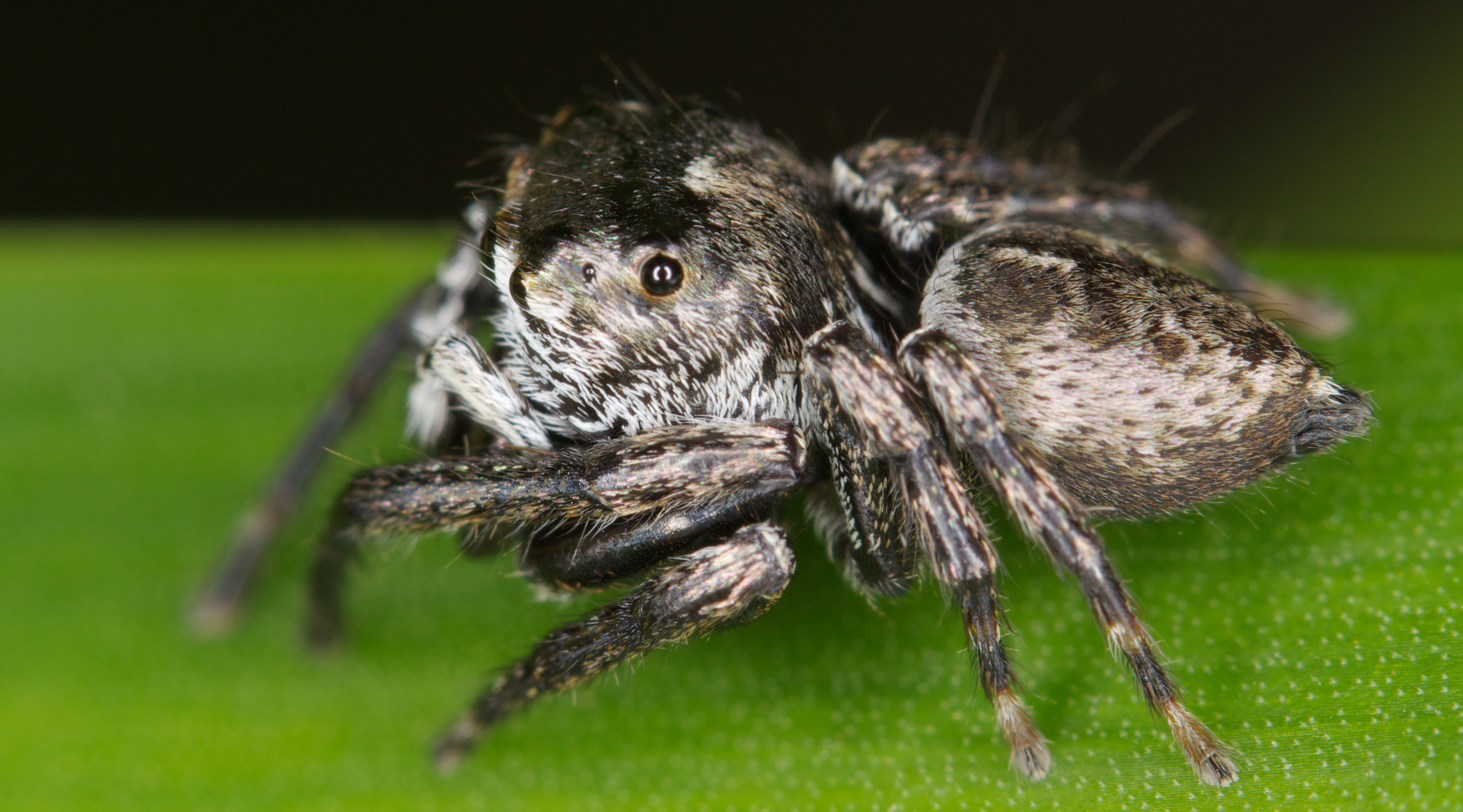
Morphology of male; note jet black coloration of body.

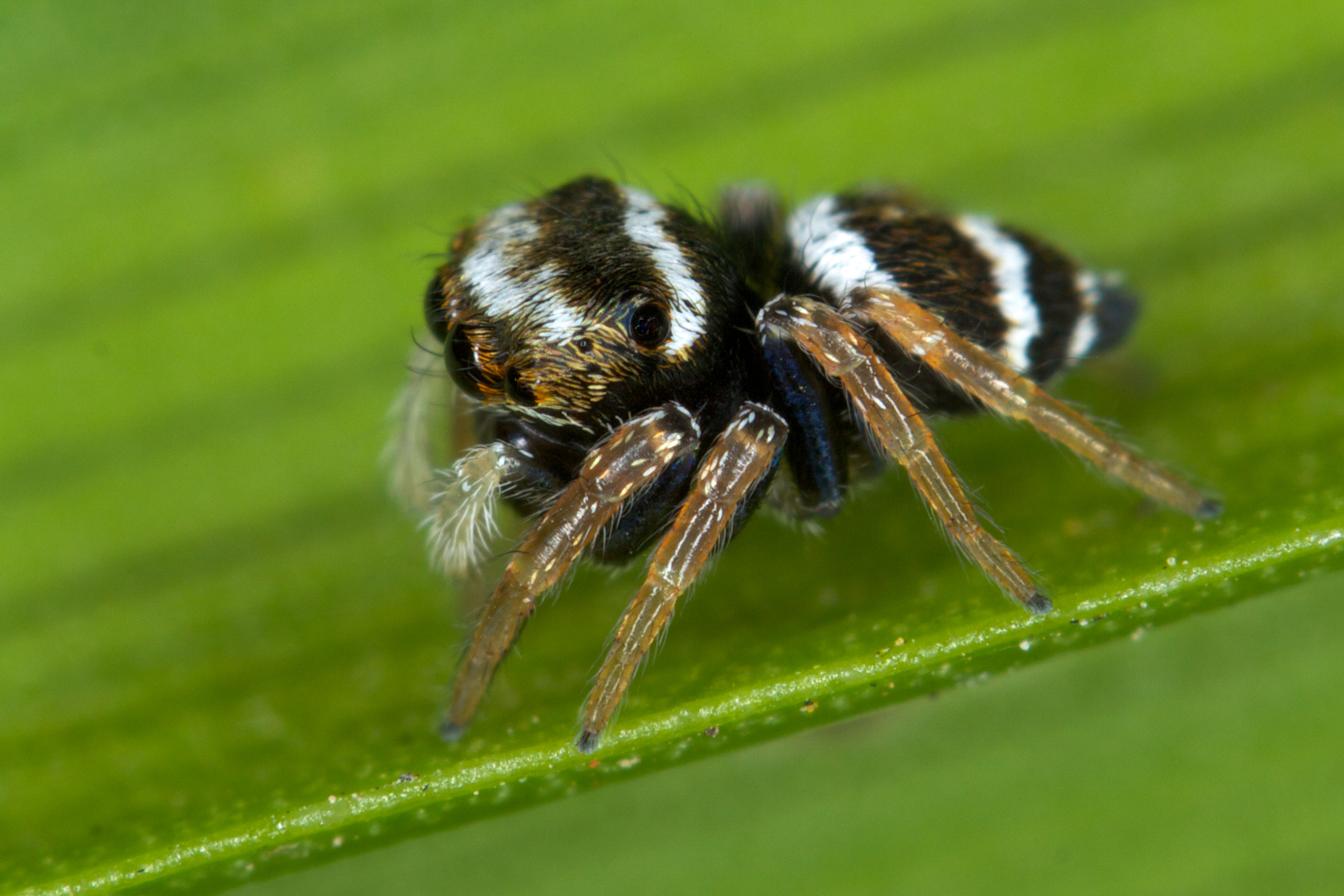
Female

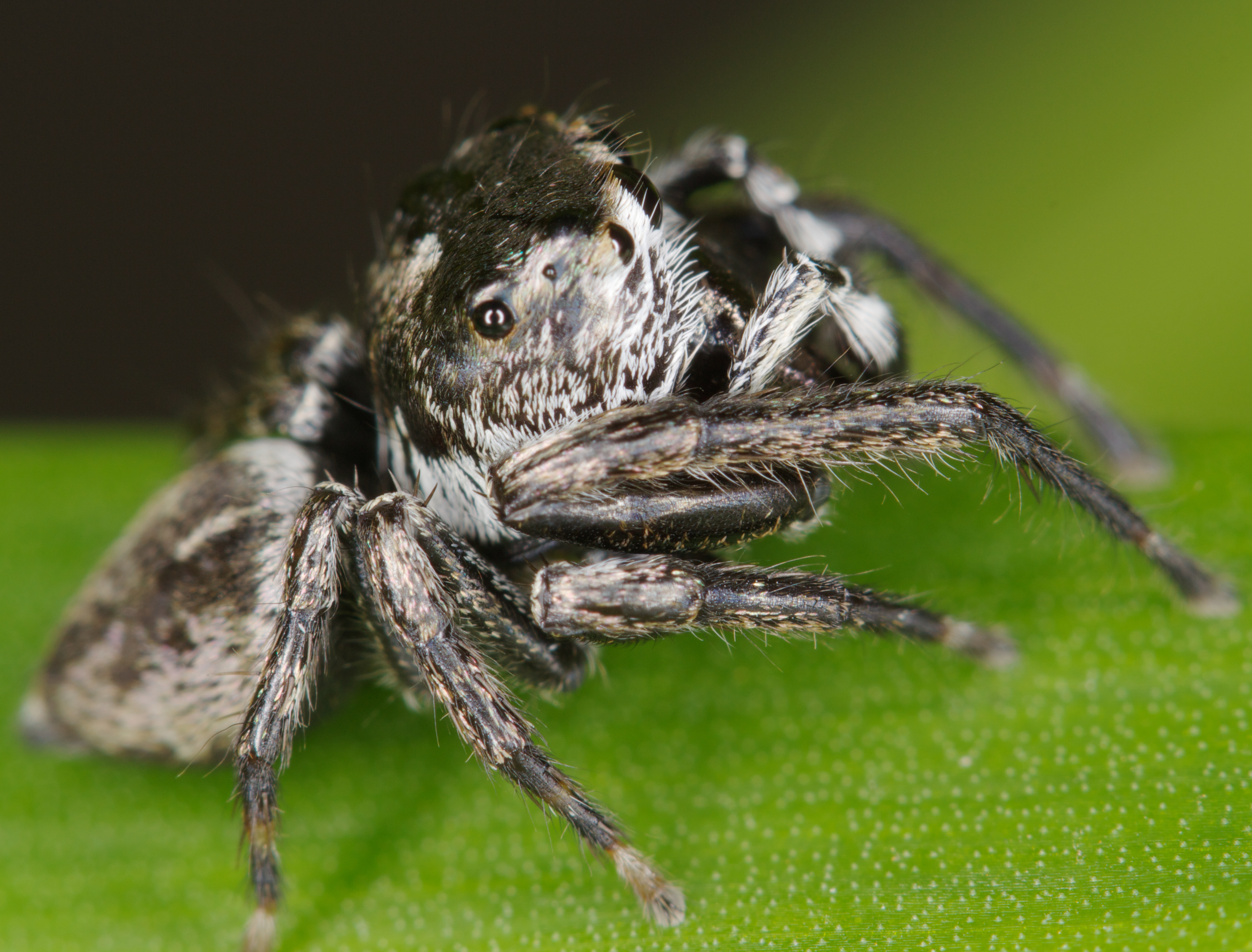
Male

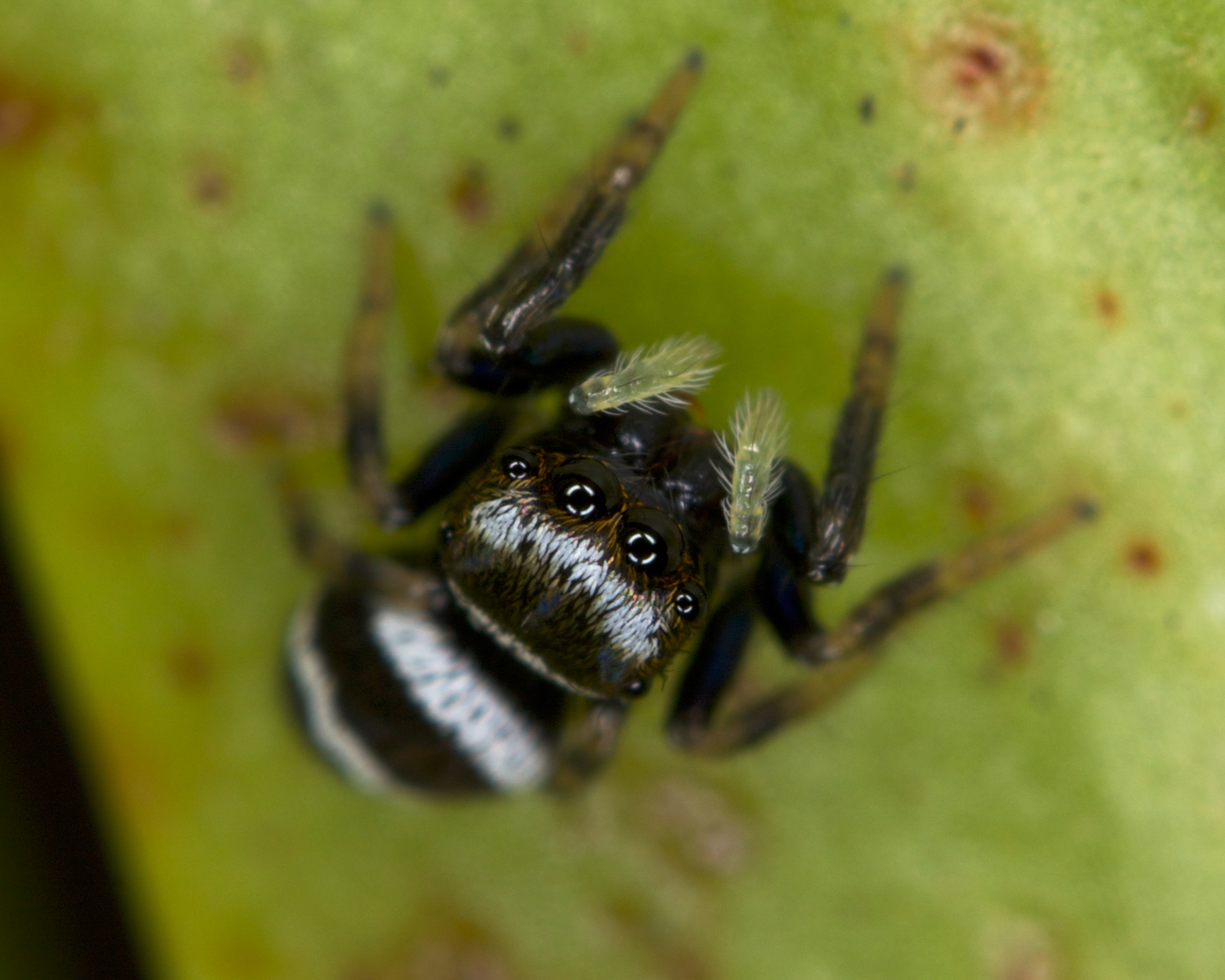
Female chelicerae

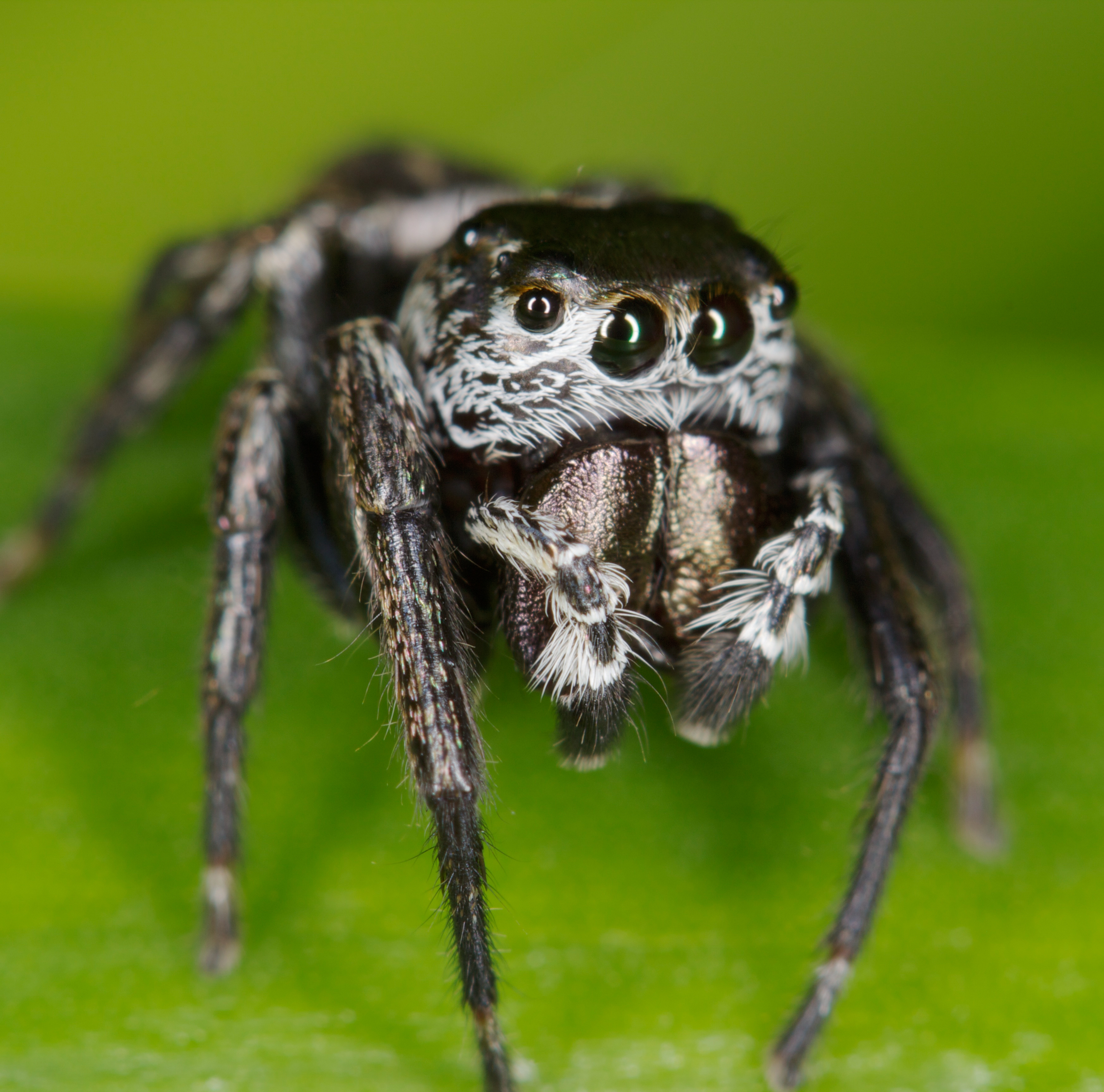
Male chelicerae

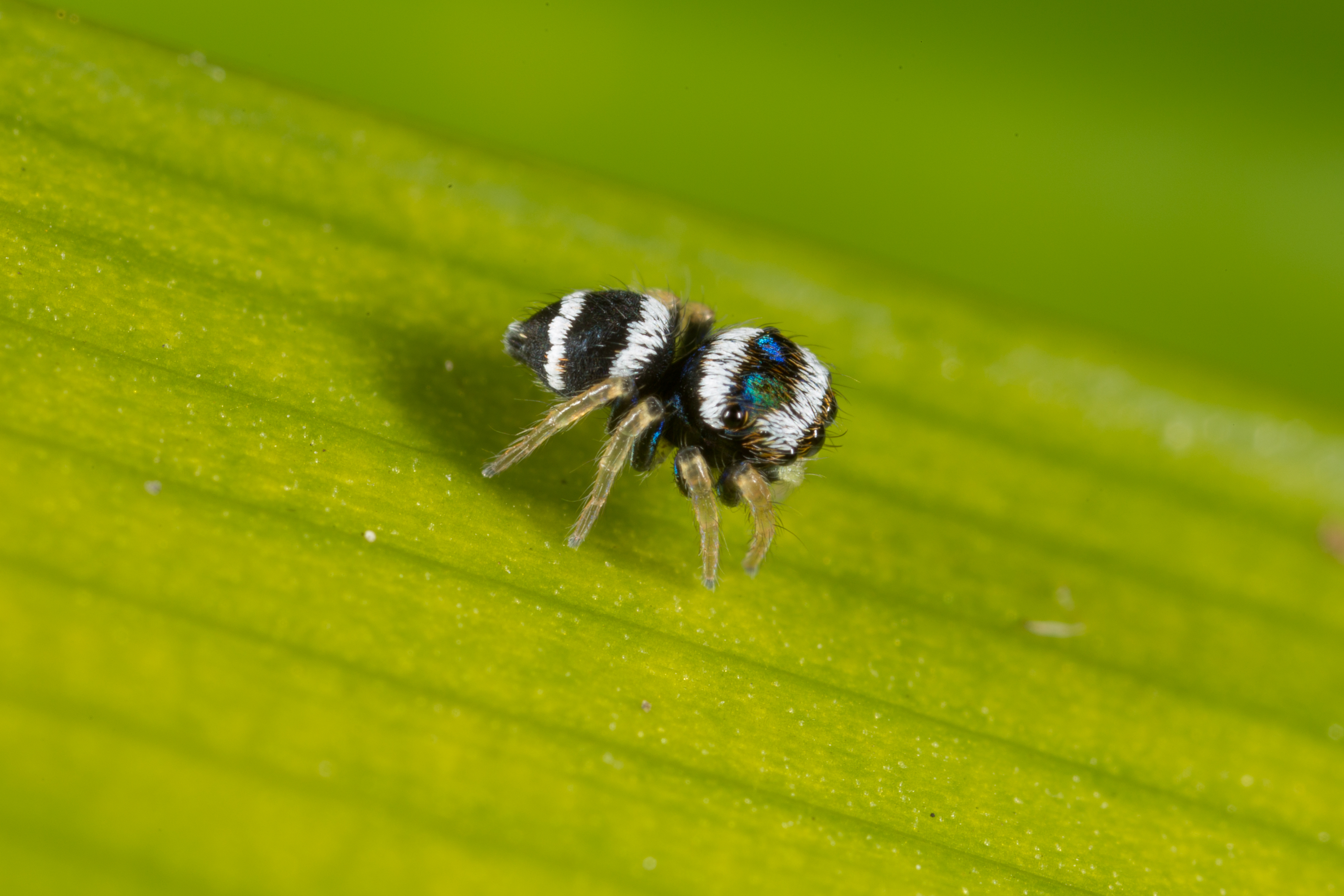
Dorsal side
