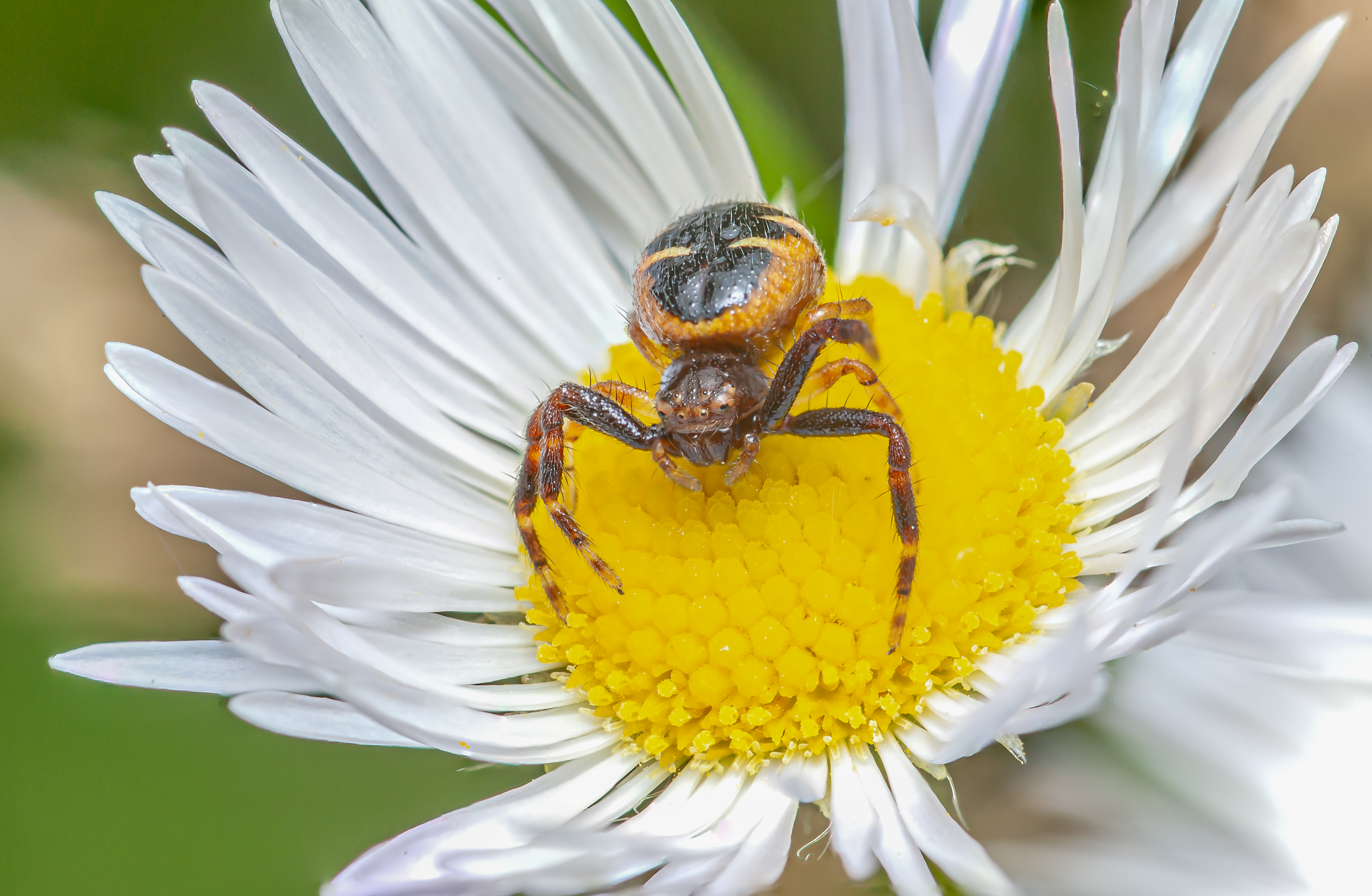

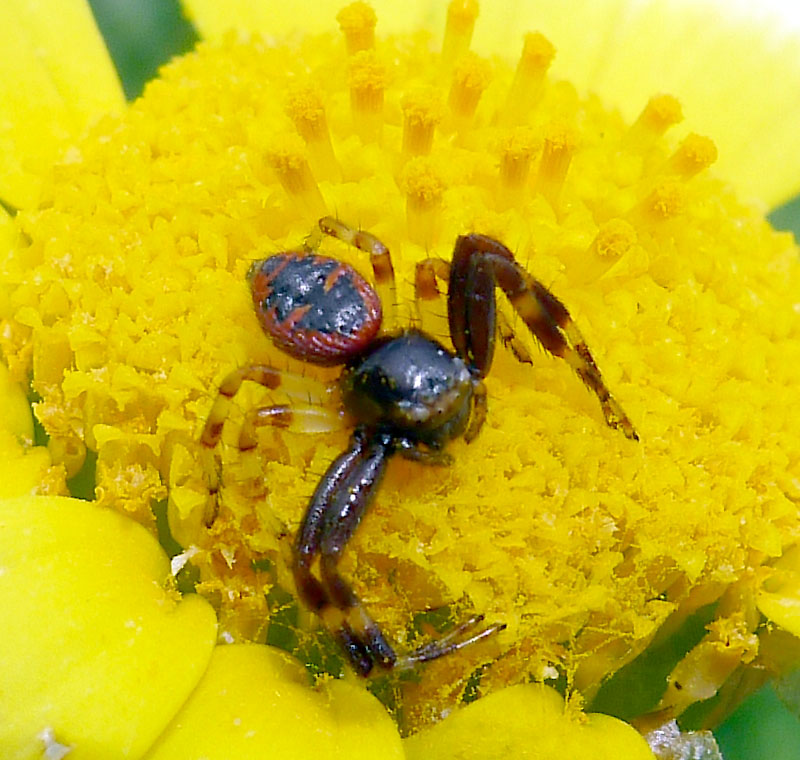
- male from UK

Scientific classification
- Kingdom: Animalia
- Phylum: Arthropoda
- Subphylum: Chelicerata
- Class: Arachnida
- Order: Araneae
- Infraorder: Araneomorphae
- Family: Thomisidae
- Genus: Synema
- Species: S. globosum

Binomial name
- Synema globosum (Fabricius, 1775)

Synonyms
- Aranea globosa Fabricius, 1775; Aranea irregularis Panzer, 1800; Aranea plantigera Rossi, 1790; Aranea rotundata Walckenaer, 1802; Diaea globosa (Fabricius, 1775); Diaea kochi Thorell, 1881; Diaea nitida L. Koch, 1878; Diaea nitidula Mello-Leitão, 1929; Synema japonicum (Karsch, 1879); Synema rotundatum (Walckenaer, 1802); Thomisus globosus (Fabricius, 1775); Thomisus rotundatus (Walckenaer, 1802)

= Synema globosum =

Species of spider

Synema globosum is a species of spider belonging to the family Thomisidae (crab spiders). It is sometimes called the Napoleon spider, because of a supposed resemblance of the markings on the abdomen to a silhouette of Napoleon wearing his iconic hat.

== Description ==
The adult males reach 2–4 mm (0.08–0.16 in) in length, while females are 7–8 millimetres (0.28–0.31 in) long. They can mostly be encountered from May through August on flowering plants (especially yellow or red Apiaceae species), waiting for their prey.

The two pairs of the front legs, used for hunting the flower-feeding insects, are more developed than the rear ones, which have a predominant motor function.

A striking feature of this species is the variation in colour among females. Mature males have a black abdomen with two white marks. In mature females, the background colour of the abdomen can be red, yellow or white, with a black pattern which has been noted for a certain resemblance to the silhouette of Napoleon. Prosoma and legs are black or dark brown.

Like other species of the family Thomisidae, these spiders do not make a web, but actively hunt their prey.

Colour variations in females
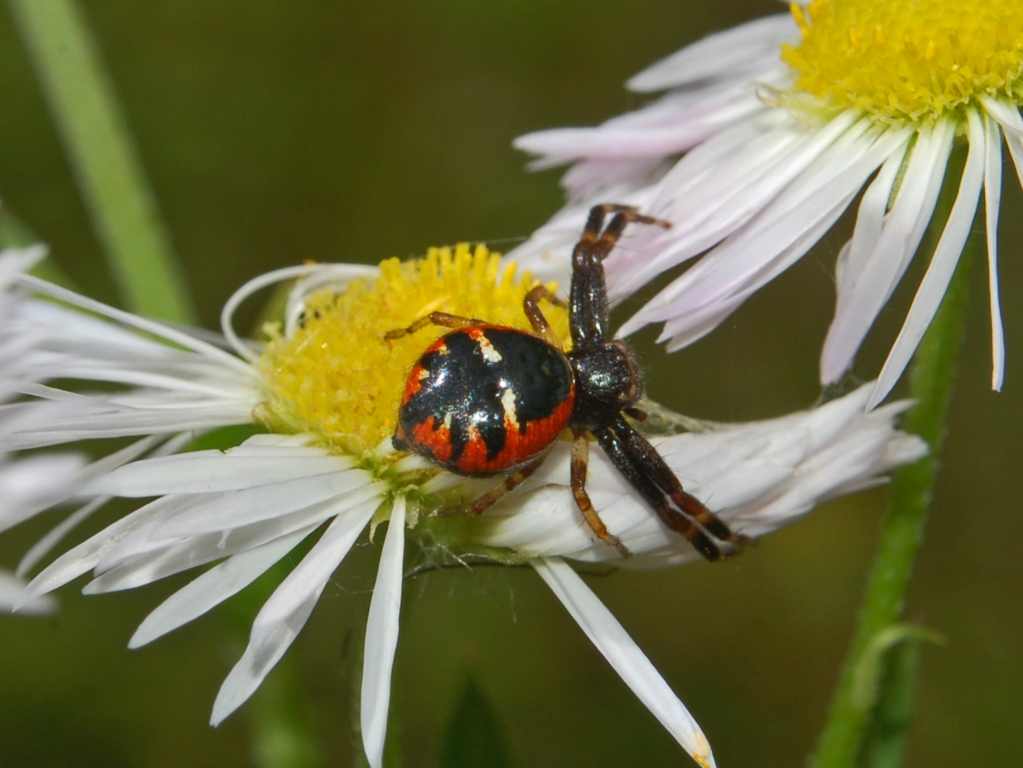
Red form

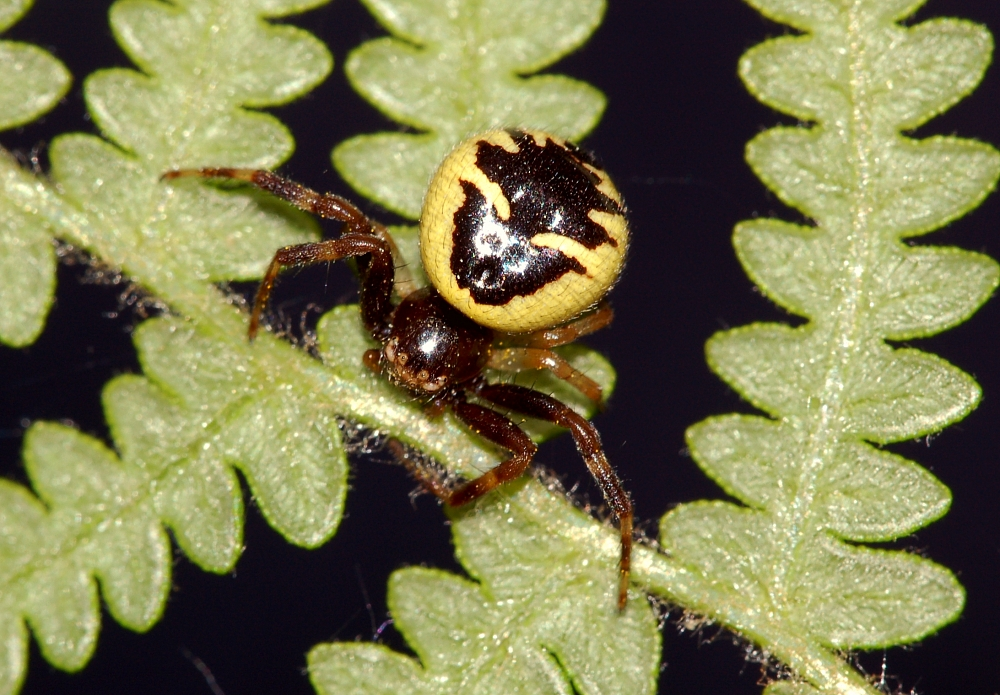
Yellow form

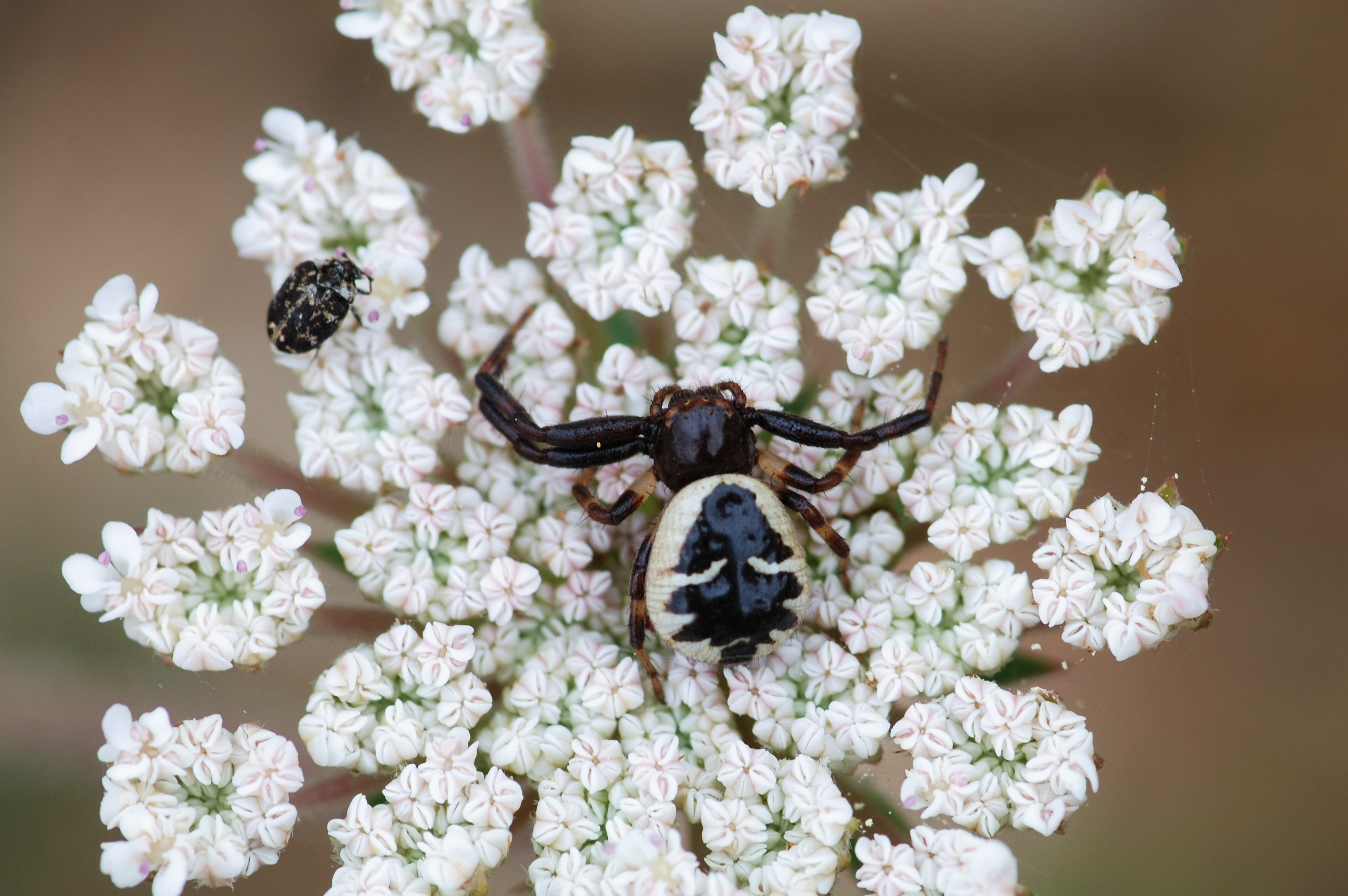
White form

== Distribution ==
This species is present in most countries of Europe and in the eastern Palearctic realm, although absent from Scandinavia and the British Isles. It is especially common throughout the Mediterranean region.

== Subspecies ==
Subspecies that have been recognized are:

- Synema globosum canariense Dahl, 1907
- Synema globosum globosum (Fabricius, 1775)
- Synema globosum nigriventre Kulczyński, 1901
