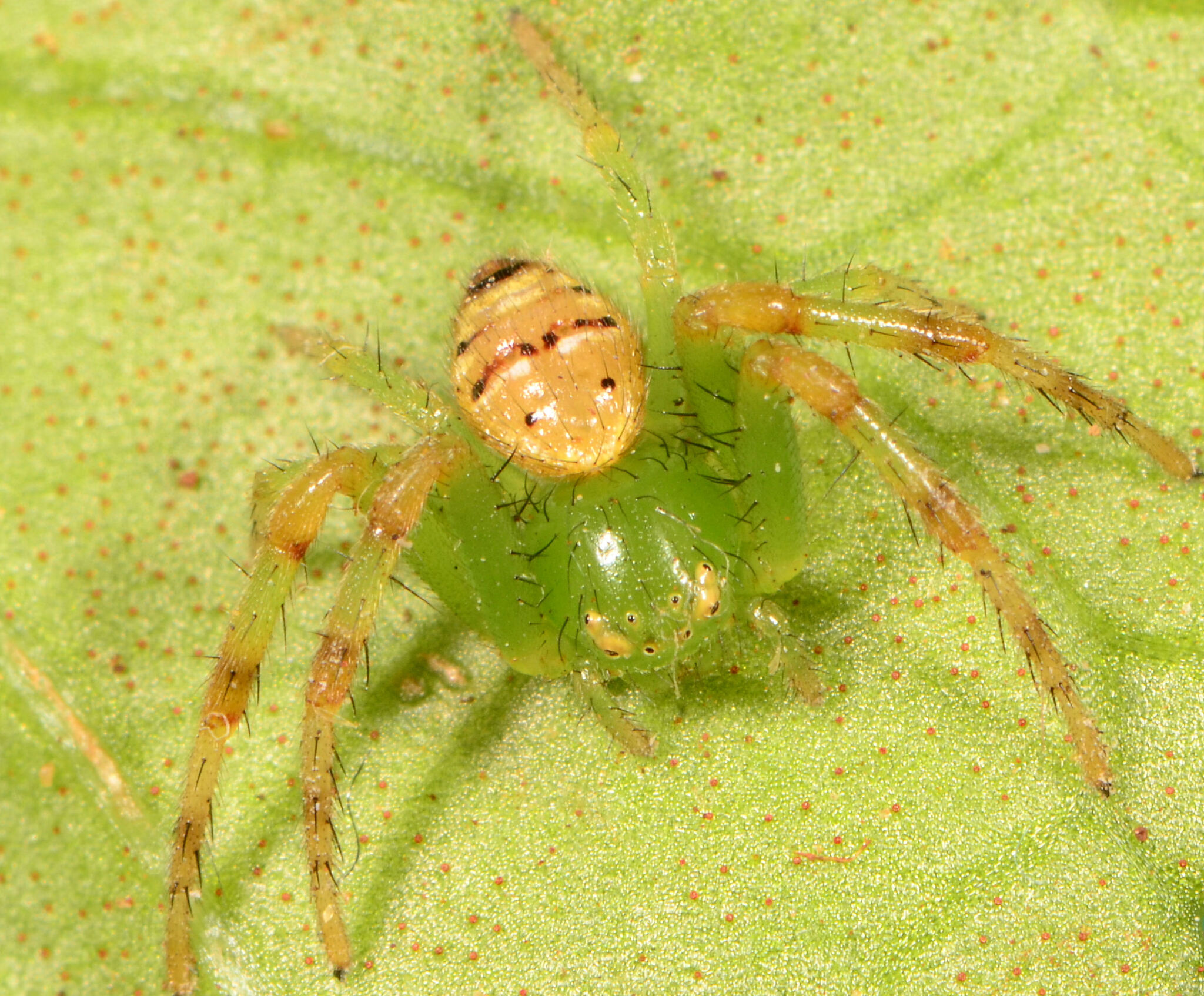
- female from South Africa
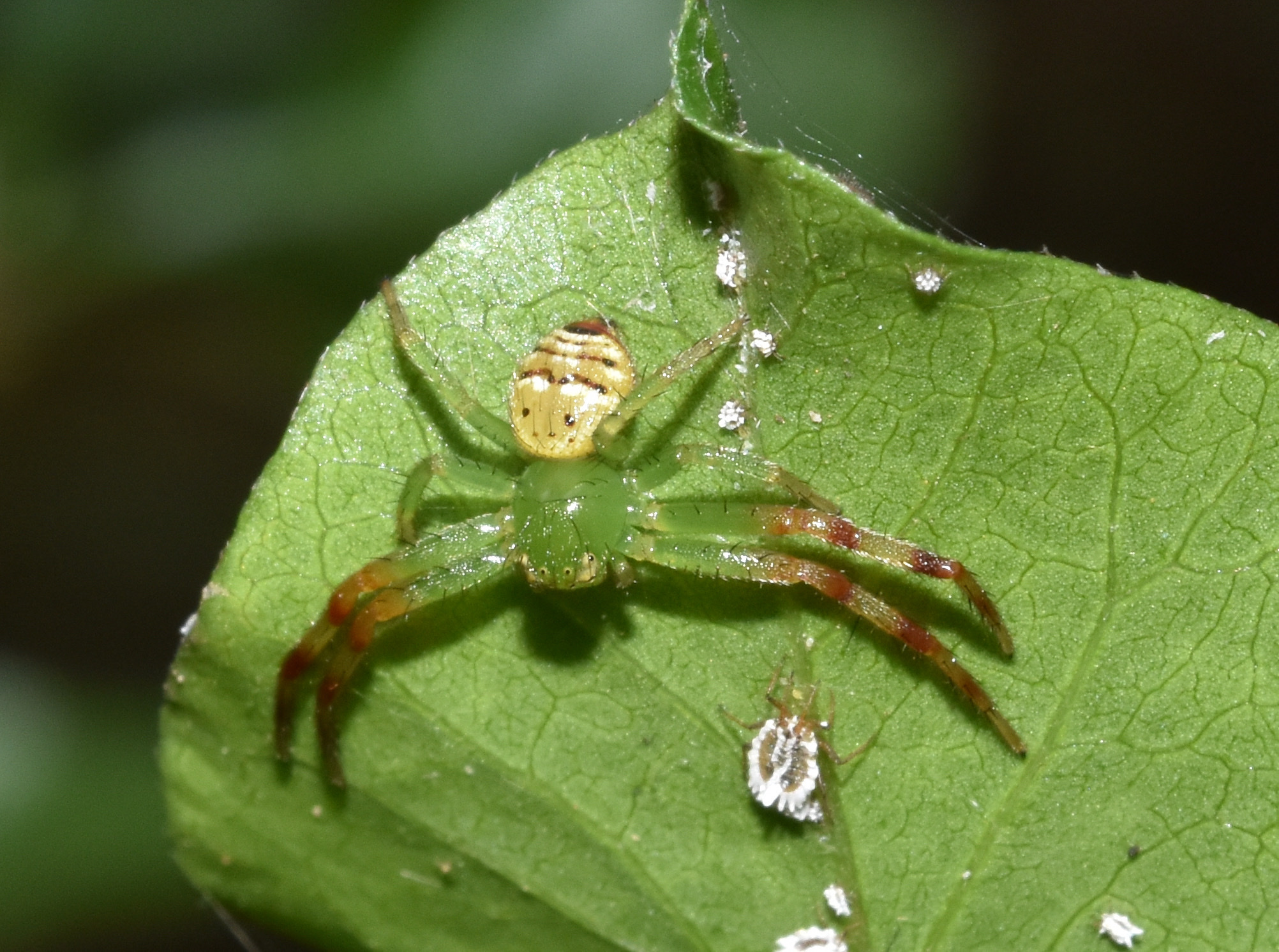
- from Durban

Scientific classification
- Kingdom: Animalia
- Phylum: Arthropoda
- Subphylum: Chelicerata
- Class: Arachnida
- Order: Araneae
- Infraorder: Araneomorphae
- Family: Thomisidae
- Genus: Synema
- Species: S. diana

Binomial name
- Synema diana (Audouin, 1826)

Synonyms
- Thomisus diana Audouin, 1826; Thomisus trematus Walckenaer, 1837; Synema tremata Simon, 1864; Diaea diana O. Pickard-Cambridge, 1876; Synaema diana Simon, 1882; Synema audouini Roewer, 1951

= Synema diana =

Banded Synema's crab spider

Species of crab spider

Synema diana is a species of crab spider in the family Thomisidae. It is widely distributed across Africa and the Middle East, ranging from Tunisia to Saudi Arabia and extending south to South Africa.

== Distribution ==
Synema diana has been recorded from Tunisia, Egypt, throughout eastern Africa including Eritrea, Ethiopia, and Tanzania, and extends south to South Africa, Lesotho, and Eswatini. The species also occurs in the Arabian Peninsula, with records from Yemen, Israel, and Saudi Arabia.

In South Africa, the species is known from Gauteng, KwaZulu-Natal, Limpopo, and Mpumalanga.

== Habitat ==
Synema diana is a free-living spider found on vegetation and occasionally inside flower corollas. It inhabits various biomes including forest, grassland, Indian Ocean coastal belt, and savanna environments. The species has also been recorded in agricultural settings, including citrus and macadamia orchards and tomato fields.

In Israel, Synema diana spins a small retreat web on tips of Tamarix twigs, with adults found almost throughout the year except possibly from October to December.

== Description ==
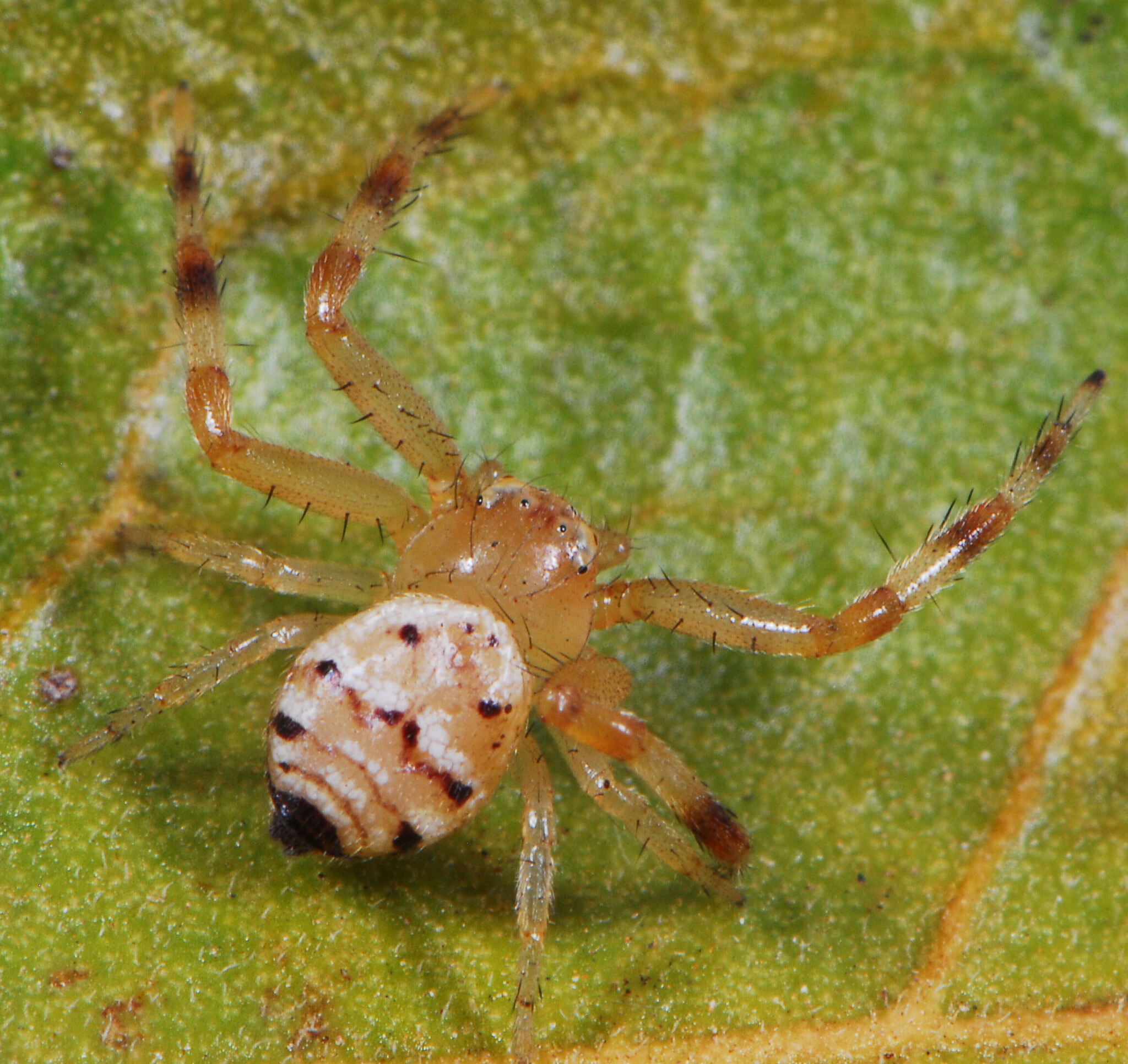
female

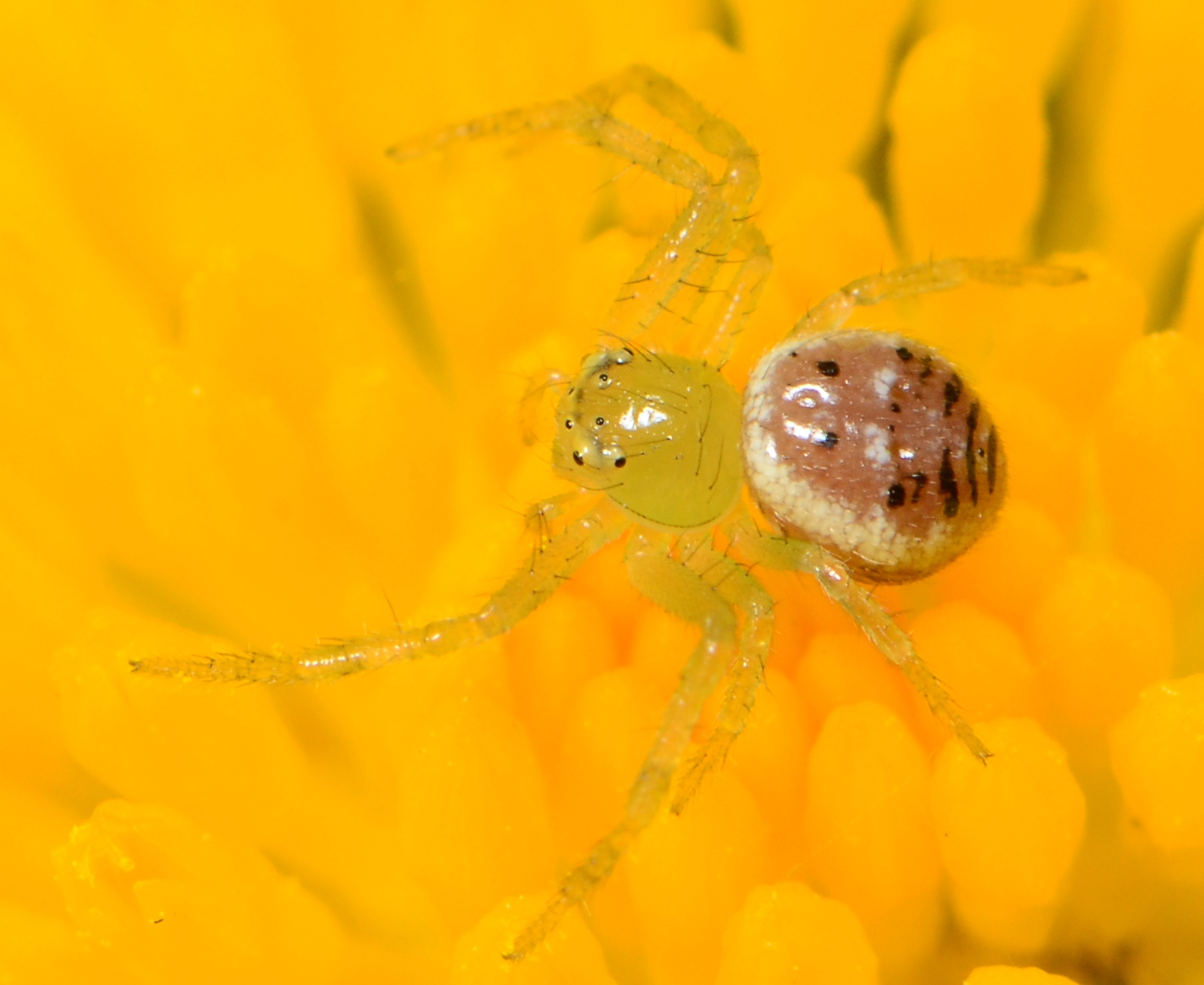
female

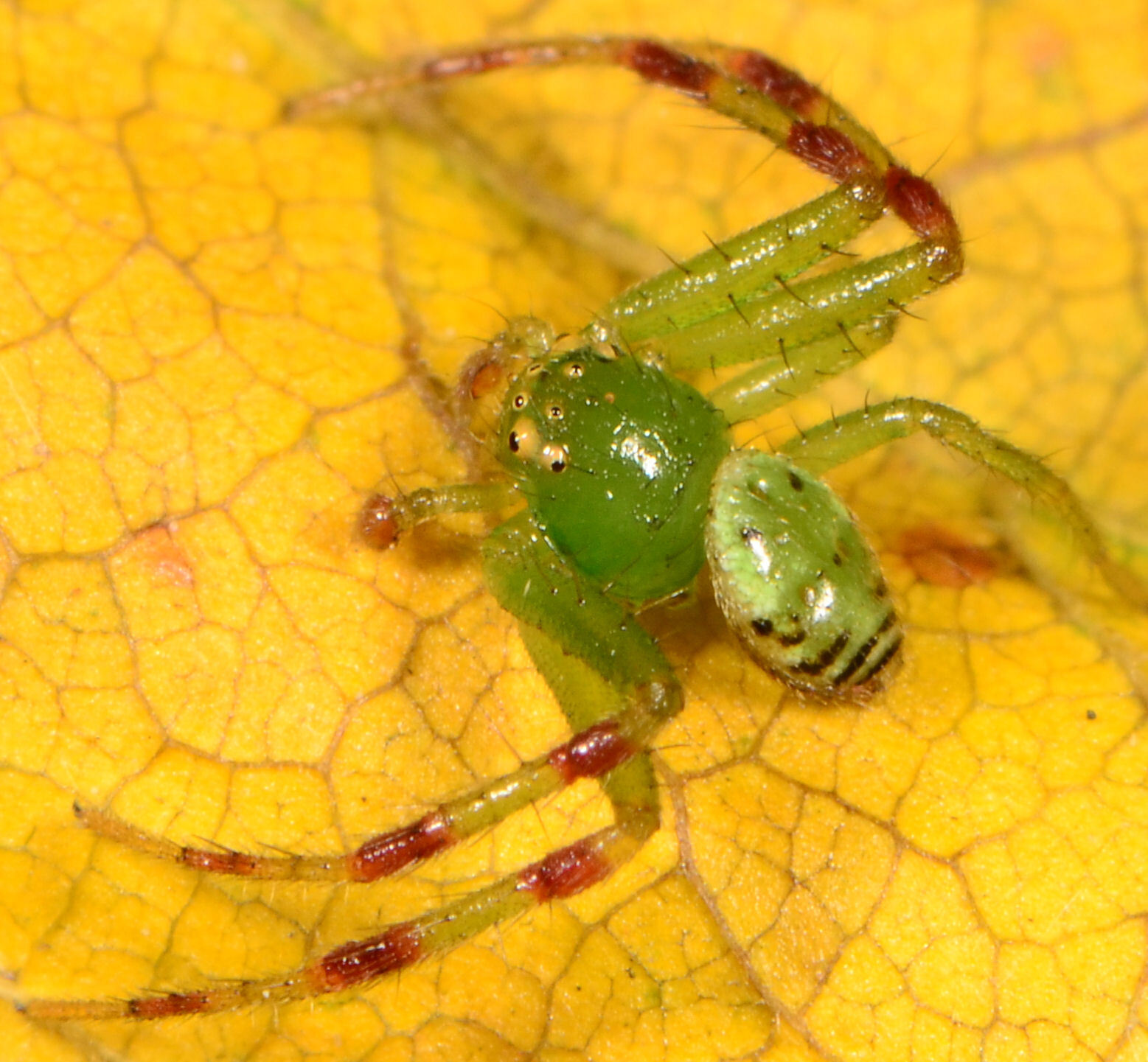
female

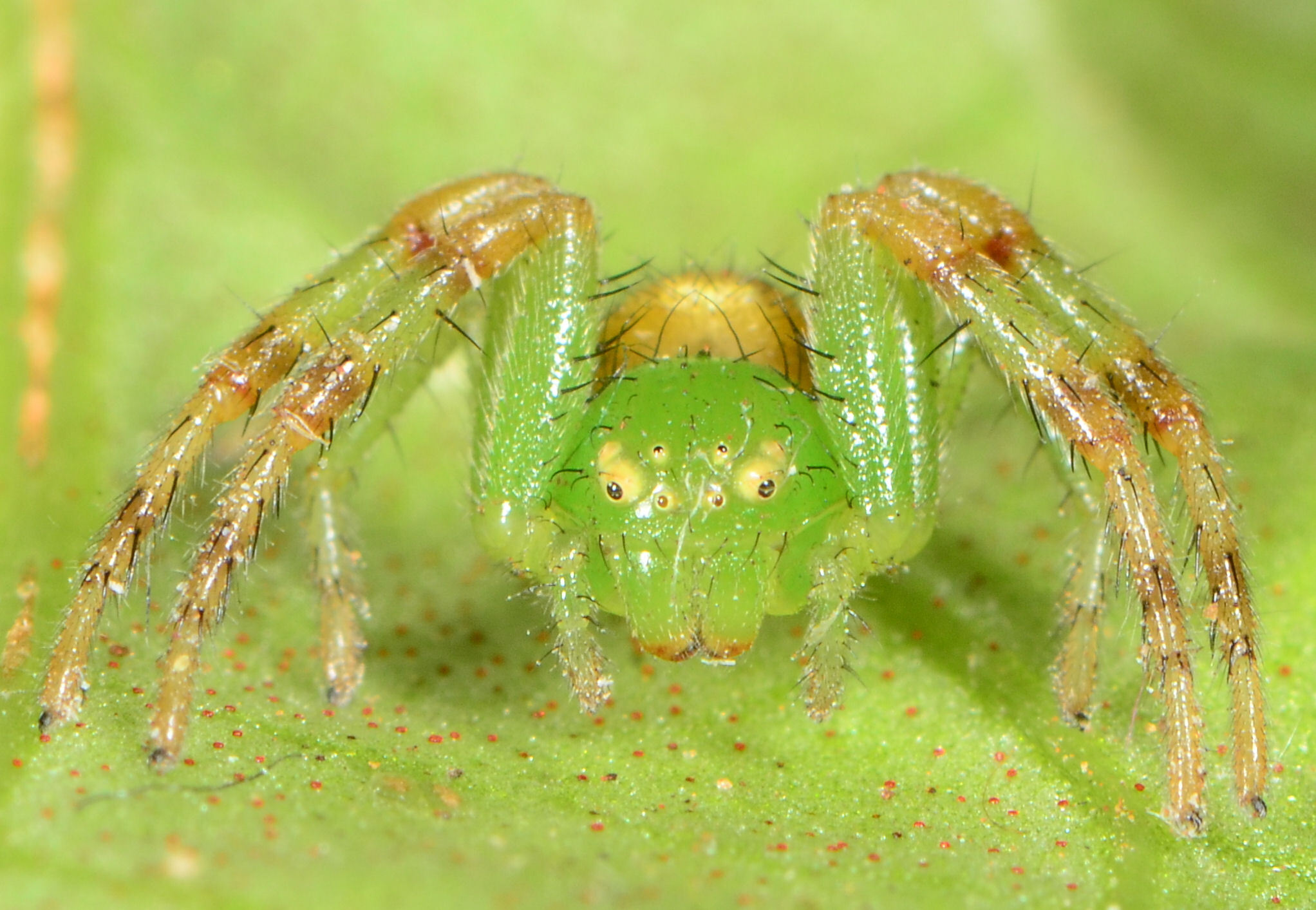
female

Females of Synema diana measure 4.4–6.5 mm in total length, while males are smaller at 3.6–4.7 mm. The cephalothorax is deep green with white eye tubercles.

Female Synema diana have a white opisthosoma decorated with black and red spots arranged in a distinctive pattern reminiscent of the Cedar of Lebanon flag design. The legs are green with red rings.

Males differ in coloration, having a green opisthosoma with white patches rather than the spotted pattern of females. The legs maintain the same green coloration with red rings as in females.

The male pedipalps are of medium size, with a tibia that is short and approximately as long as it is wide.

== Conservation status ==
Synema diana is listed as Least Concern due to its wide geographical range and stable populations. No known threats have been identified, and the species is recorded in several protected areas including Roodeplaatdam Nature Reserve and Polokwane Nature Reserve.
