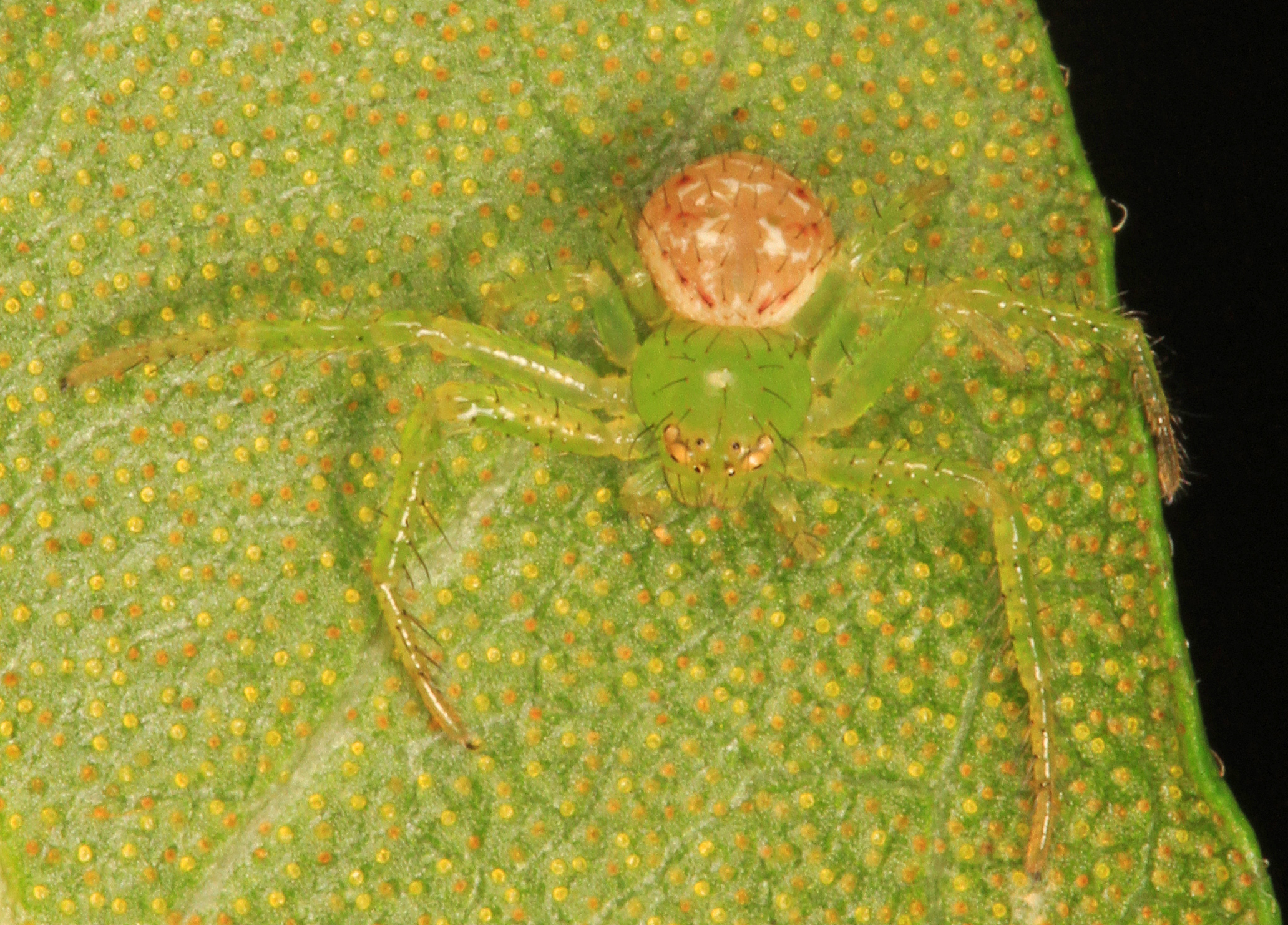

Scientific classification
- Domain: Eukaryota
- Kingdom: Animalia
- Phylum: Arthropoda
- Subphylum: Chelicerata
- Class: Arachnida
- Order: Araneae
- Infraorder: Araneomorphae
- Family: Thomisidae
- Genus: Synema
- Species: S. viridans

Binomial name
- Synema viridans (Banks, 1896)

= Synema viridans =

Species of spider

Synema viridans is a species of crab spider in the family Thomisidae. It is found in the United States.
