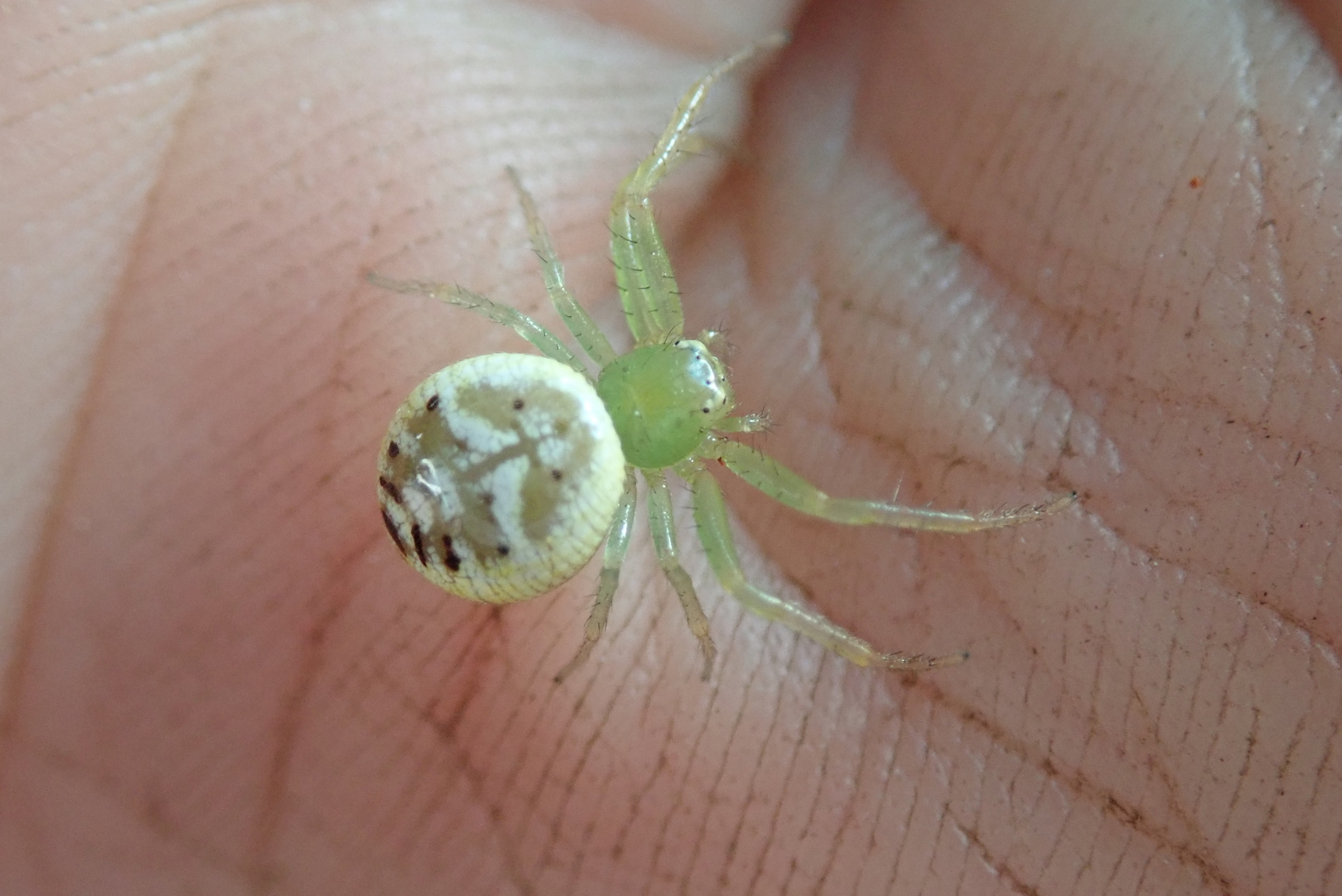
- S. simoneae from Botswana
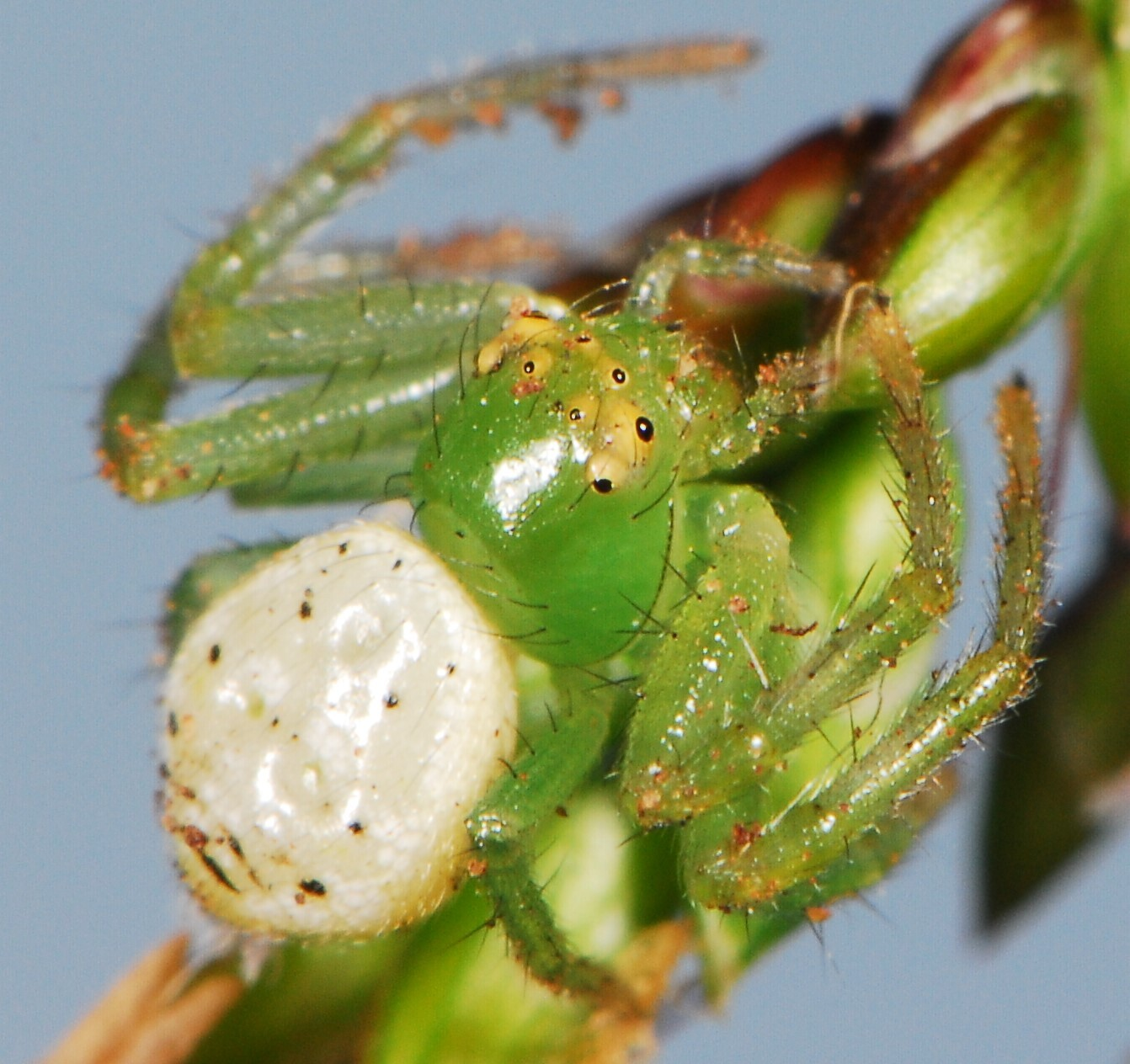
- female

Scientific classification
- Kingdom: Animalia
- Phylum: Arthropoda
- Subphylum: Chelicerata
- Class: Arachnida
- Order: Araneae
- Infraorder: Araneomorphae
- Family: Thomisidae
- Genus: Synema
- Species: S. simoneae

Binomial name
- Synema simoneae Lessert, 1919

= Synema simoneae =

Species of crab spider

Synema simoneae is a species of crab spider in the family Thomisidae. It is endemic to Africa, where it has been recorded from Tanzania, South Africa, and Lesotho.

== Taxonomy ==
Synema simoneae was described by Roger de Lessert in 1919 from specimens collected in Tanzania, with only the female known at the time. The male remains undescribed, though immature males have been observed.

== Distribution ==
Synema simoneae has a wide distribution across eastern and southern Africa. The species was originally described from Tanzania and has since been recorded from South Africa and Lesotho. In South Africa, it has been found in the provinces of Eastern Cape, Gauteng, KwaZulu-Natal, Limpopo, and Western Cape.

The species occurs across multiple biomes including the Fynbos, Indian Ocean Coastal Belt, Thicket, Grassland, and Savanna biomes, at elevations ranging from 19 to 2066 metres above sea level.

== Habitat ==
Synema simoneae is free-living on vegetation and is occasionally found inside flower corollas. Specimens have been collected by hand sampling and sweep netting of vegetation.

== Description ==
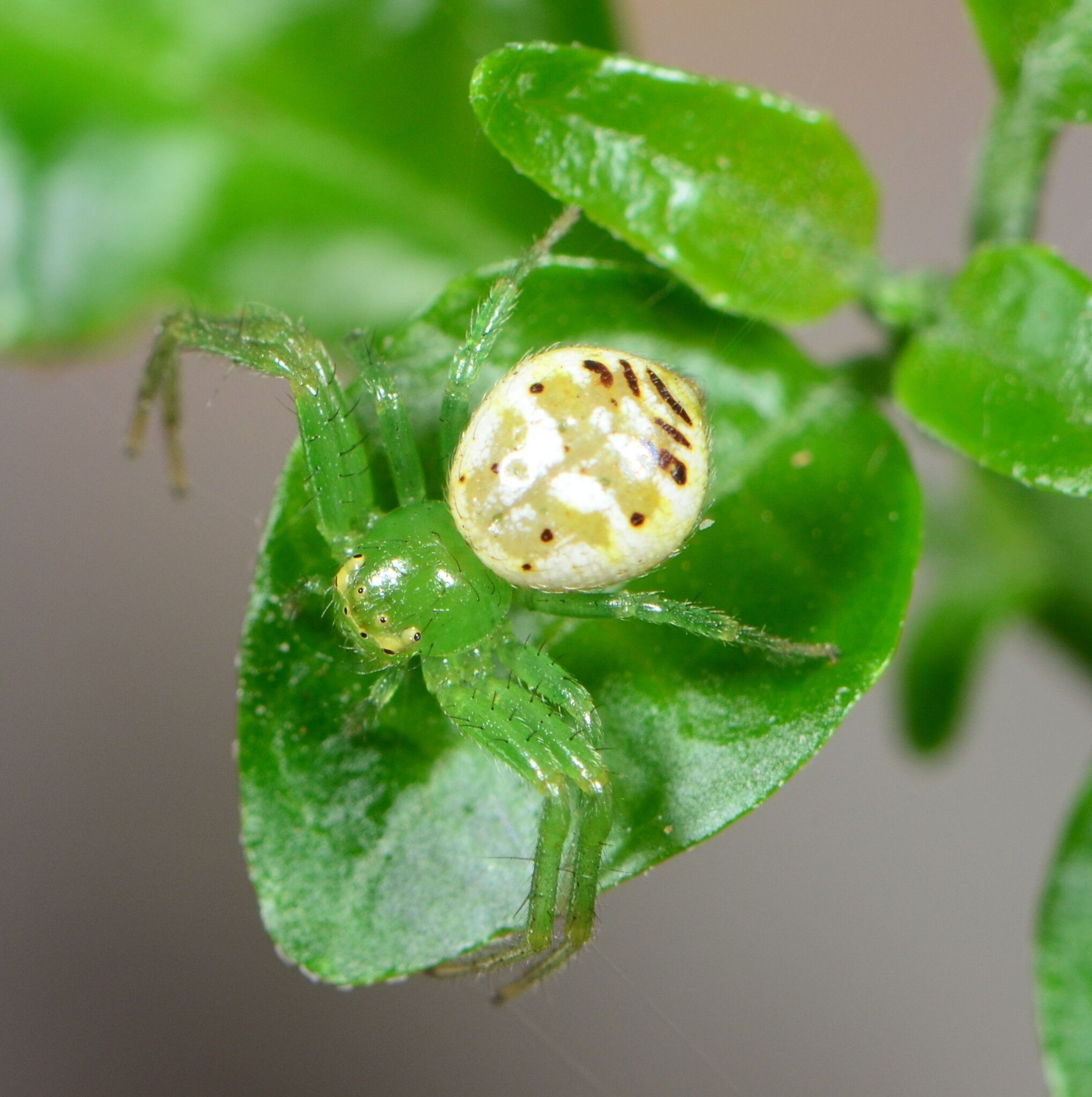
female

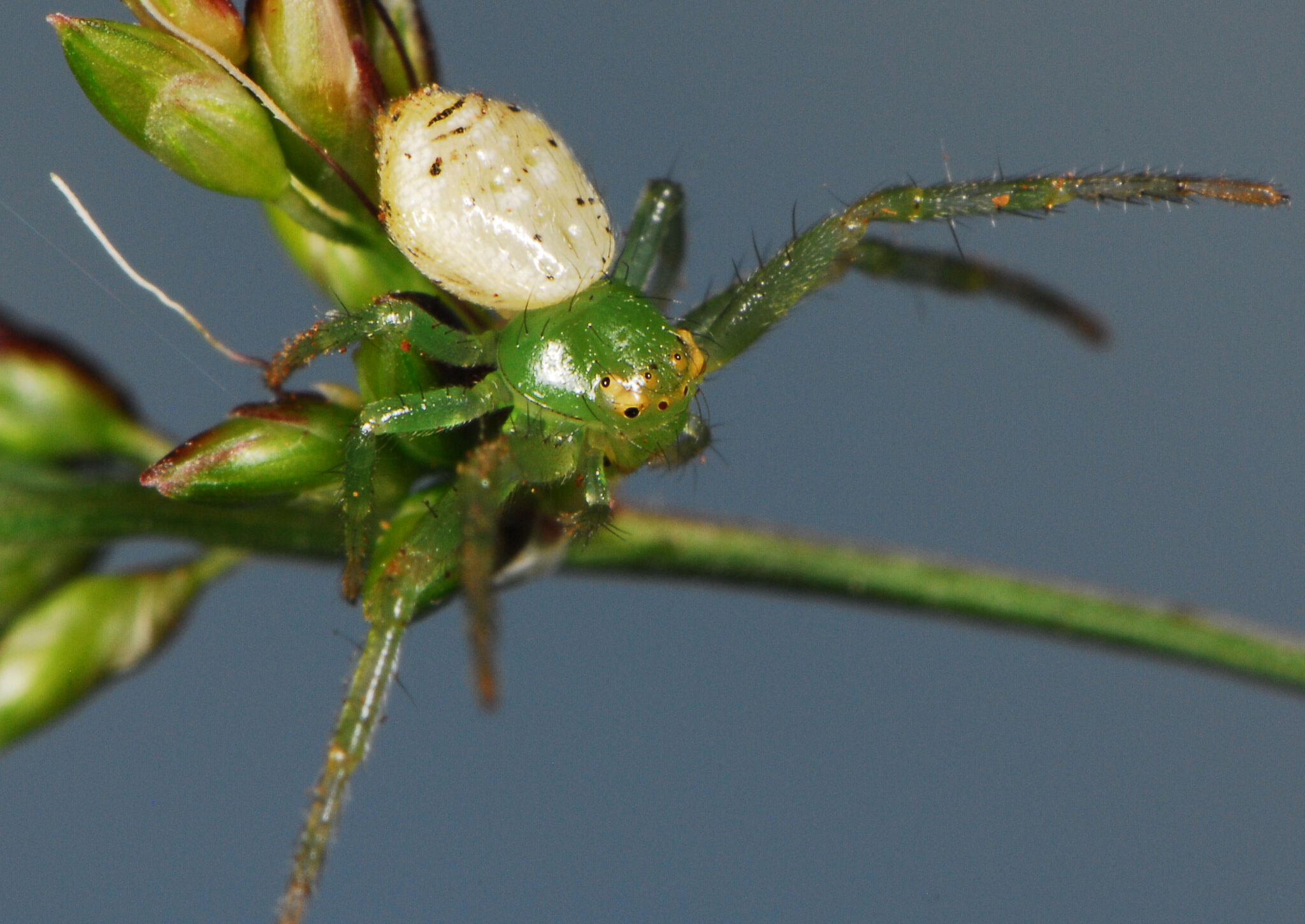
female

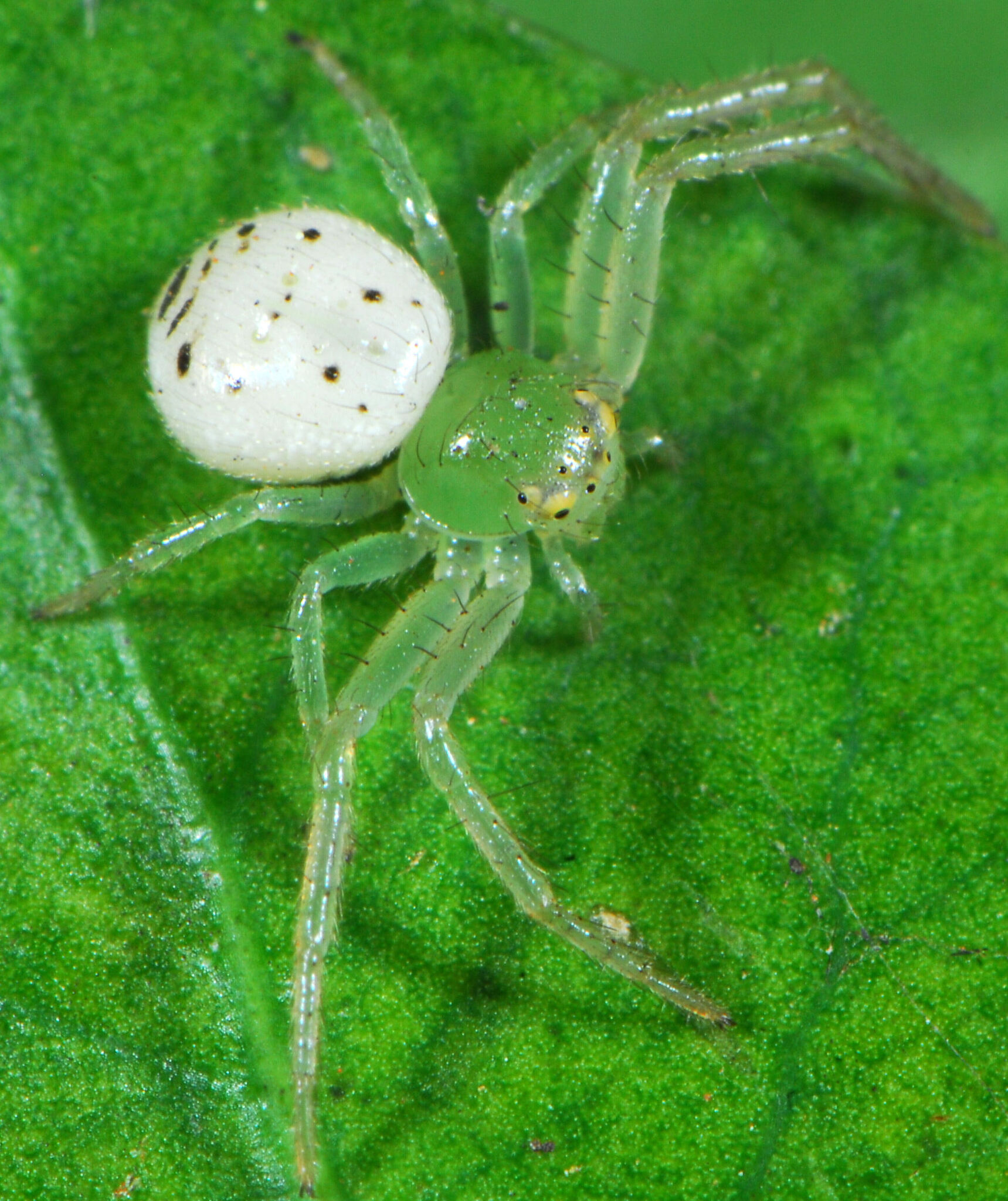
female

Females have a total length of approximately 4.1 mm. The carapace is shiny and varies in colour from pale green to dark green in live specimens, with the eye region showing a fawn tint.

The opisthosoma is white and shiny, with six small black spots arranged along the border. Posteriorly, there are 2-3 dark transverse wavy black bands, and sometimes the dorsum appears translucent.

The first and second pairs of legs are stronger than the remaining legs and are the same colour as the carapace. The front legs sometimes show a brownish tint.

Immature males resemble females in body shape, size, and abdominal colouration, but the tibiae of legs I and II have red-brown bands.

== Conservation ==
Synema simoneae is classified as Least Concern due to its wide geographical range across Africa. The species is likely under-collected and suspected to occur in additional localities beyond those currently documented.

In South Africa, the species is protected within several conservation areas, including Mountain Zebra National Park, Roodeplaat Dam Nature Reserve, uMkuze Game Reserve, Loteni Nature Reserve, Royal Natal National Park, Ndumo Game Reserve, and Tembe Elephant Park.
