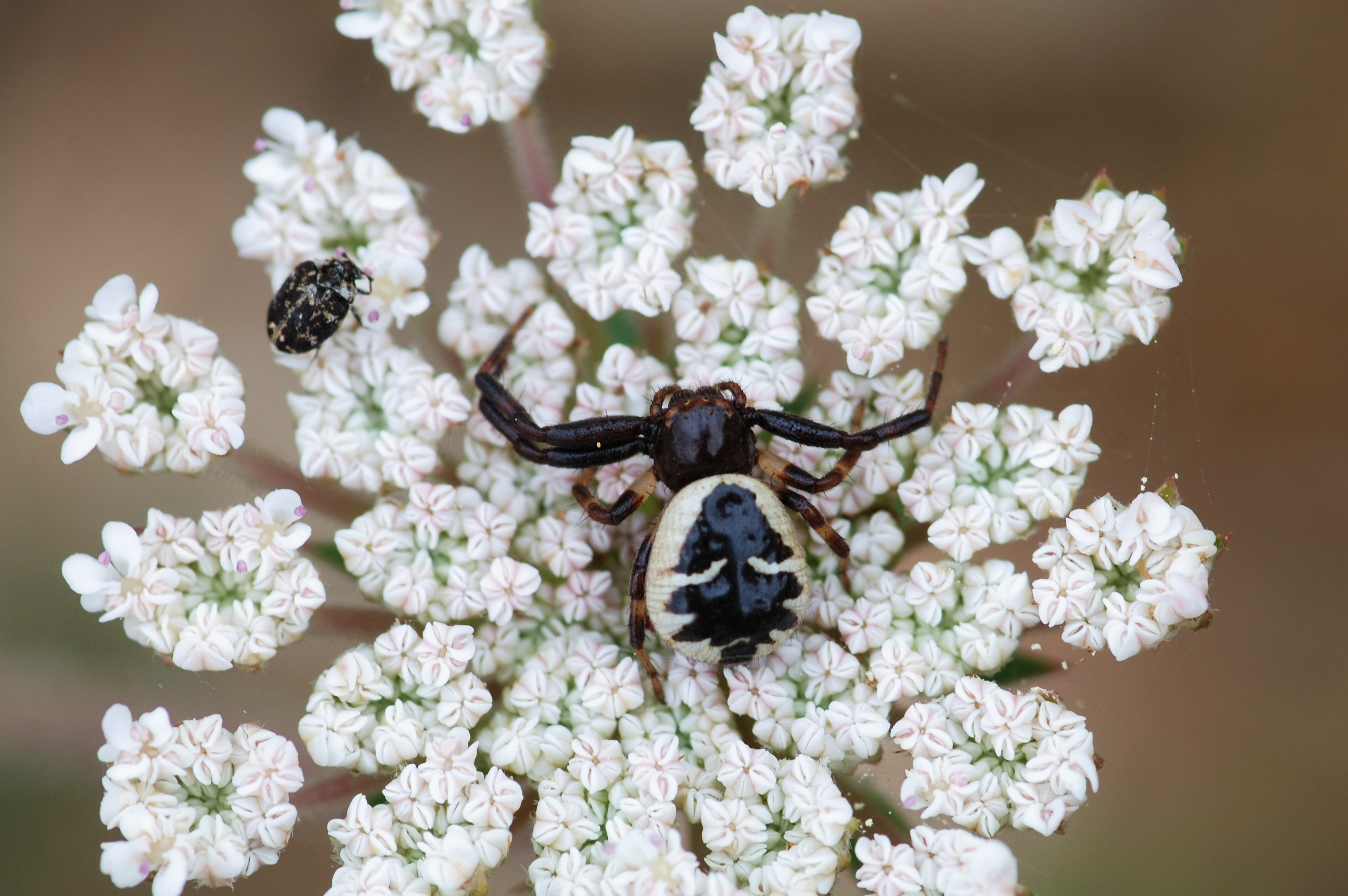
- Pale form of Synema globosum (Napoleon spider)
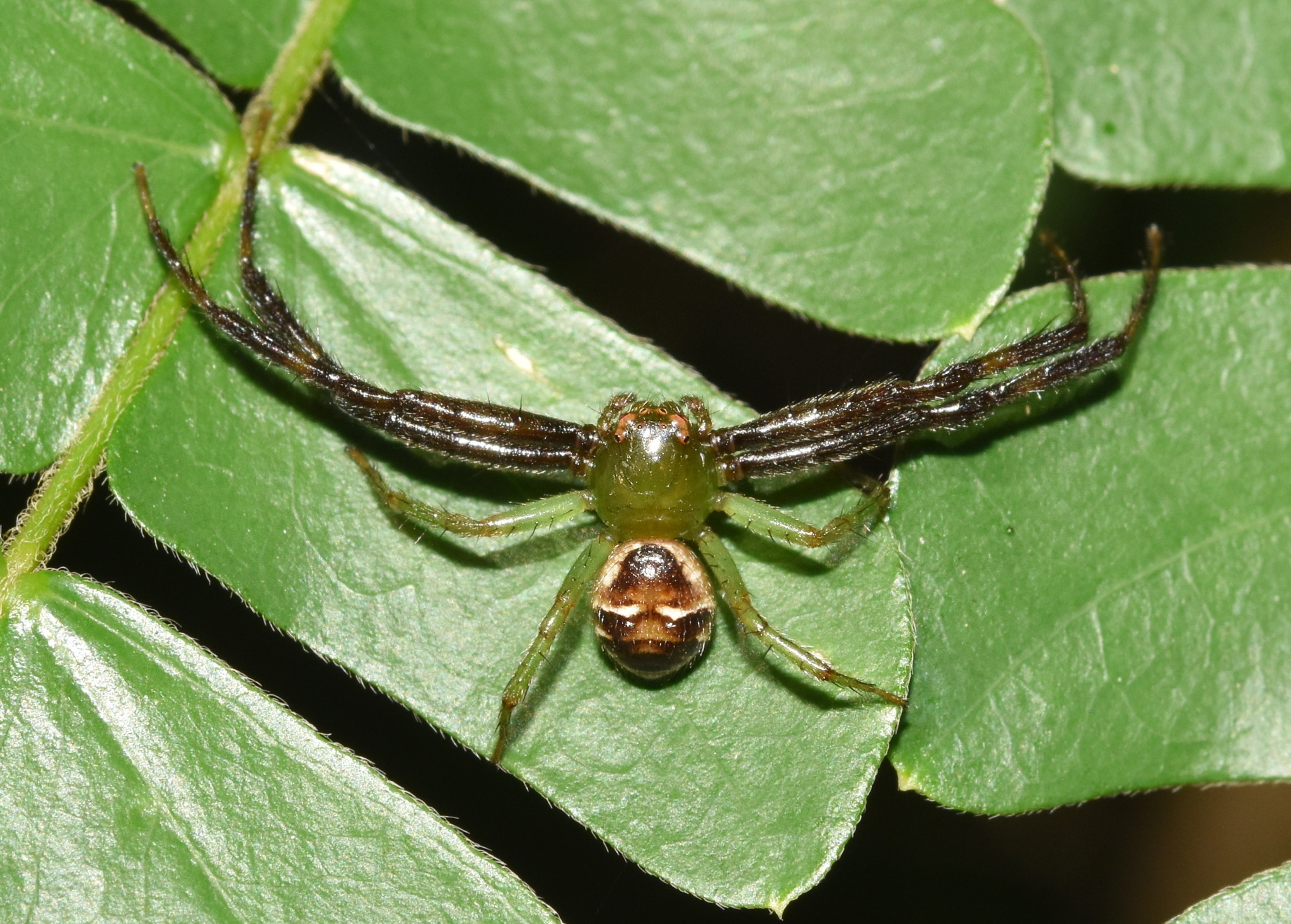
- male S. imitatrix

Scientific classification
- Kingdom: Animalia
- Phylum: Arthropoda
- Subphylum: Chelicerata
- Class: Arachnida
- Order: Araneae
- Infraorder: Araneomorphae
- Family: Thomisidae
- Genus: Synema; Simon

= Synema (spider) =

Synema Temporal range: Palaeogene–present

Genus of spiders

Synema is a genus of spider in the family Thomisidae, found in most parts of the world.

== Species ==
As of October 2025, this genus includes 124 species and two subspecies.

These species have articles on Wikipedia:

- Synema decens (Karsch, 1878) – South Africa, Eswatini
- Synema diana (Audouin, 1826) – Tunisia to Saudi Arabia, Eritrea, Ethiopia, Tanzania, South Africa, Lesotho, Eswatini
- Synema globosum (Fabricius, 1775) – Europe, North Africa, Turkey, Caucasus, Russia (Europe to Far East), Israel, Iran, Kazakhstan, Central Asia, China, Korea, Japan (type species)
- Synema imitatrix (Pavesi, 1883) – Ethiopia, Mozambique, South Africa, Eswatini
- Synema langheldi Dahl, 1907 – Somalia, Tanzania, South Africa
- Synema mandibulare Dahl, 1907 – Tanzania, South Africa
- Synema marlothi Dahl, 1907 – South Africa, Lesotho
- Synema nigrotibiale Lessert, 1919 – Tanzania, Botswana, Mozambique, South Africa, Yemen
- Synema parvulum (Hentz, 1847) – United States, Mexico
- Synema riflense Strand, 1909 – South Africa
- Synema simoneae Lessert, 1919 – Tanzania, South Africa, Lesotho
- Synema vallotoni Lessert, 1923 – Zimbabwe, South Africa
- Synema viridans (Banks, 1896) – United States
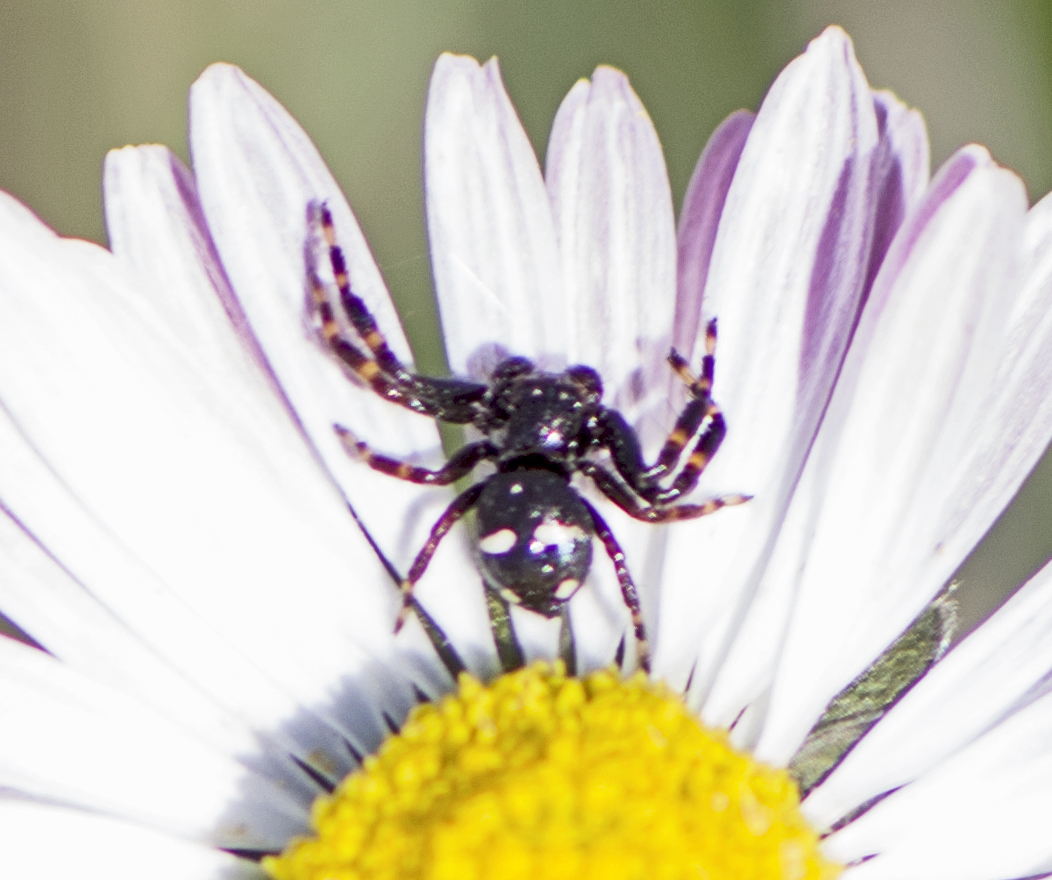
S. anatolicum

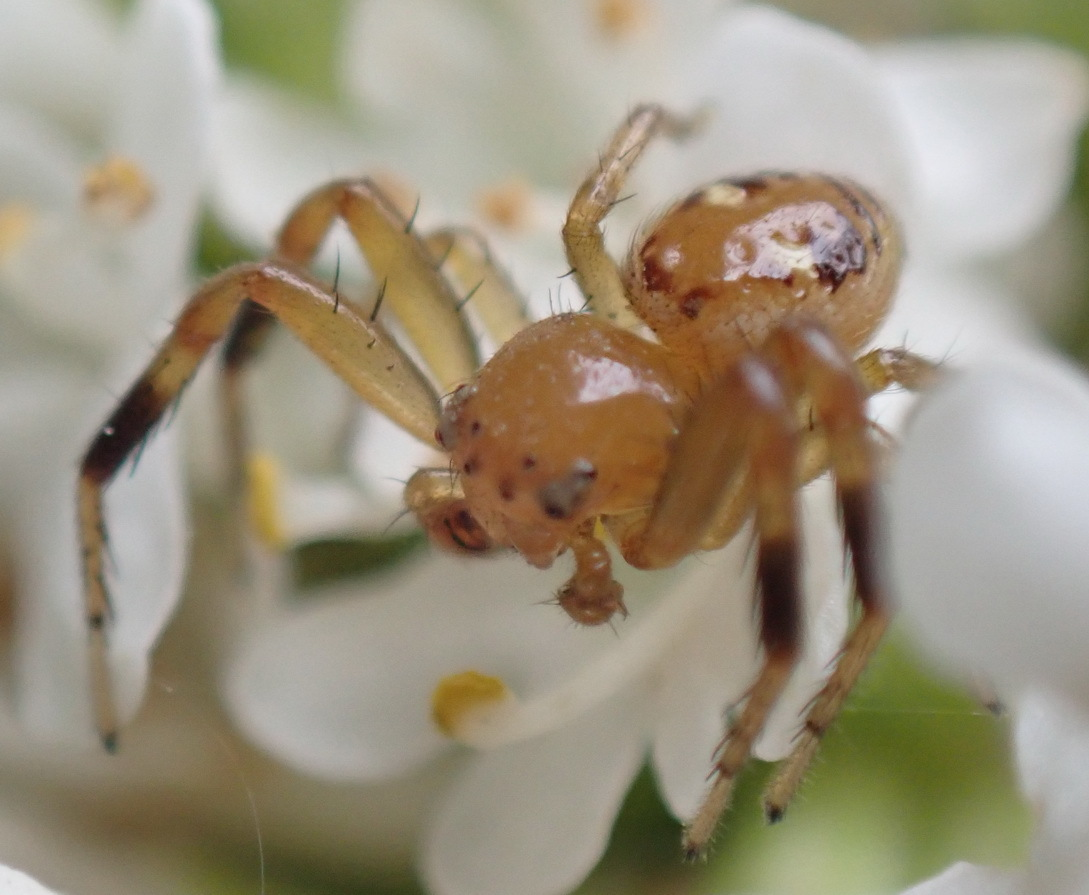
S. decens

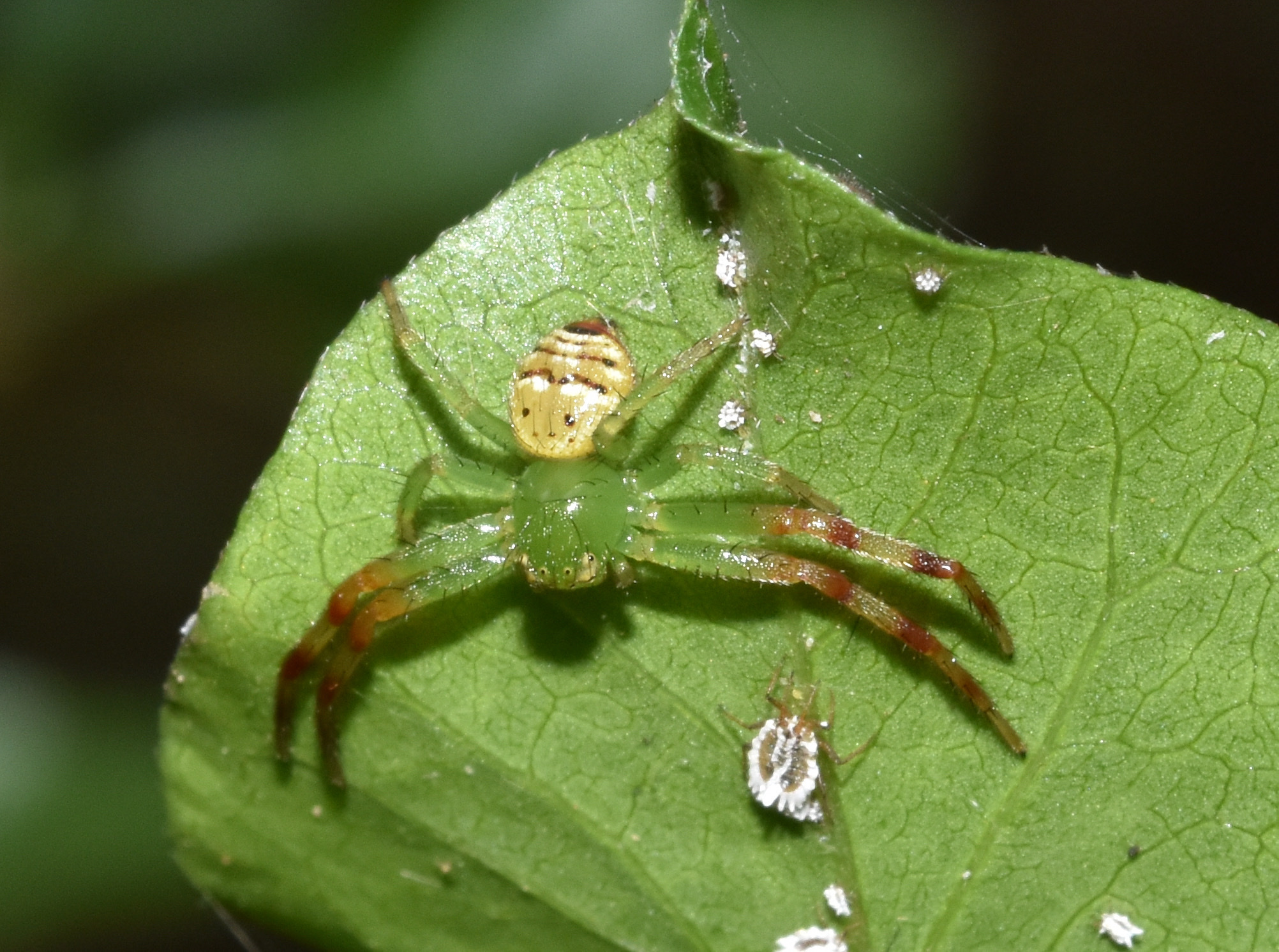
S. diana

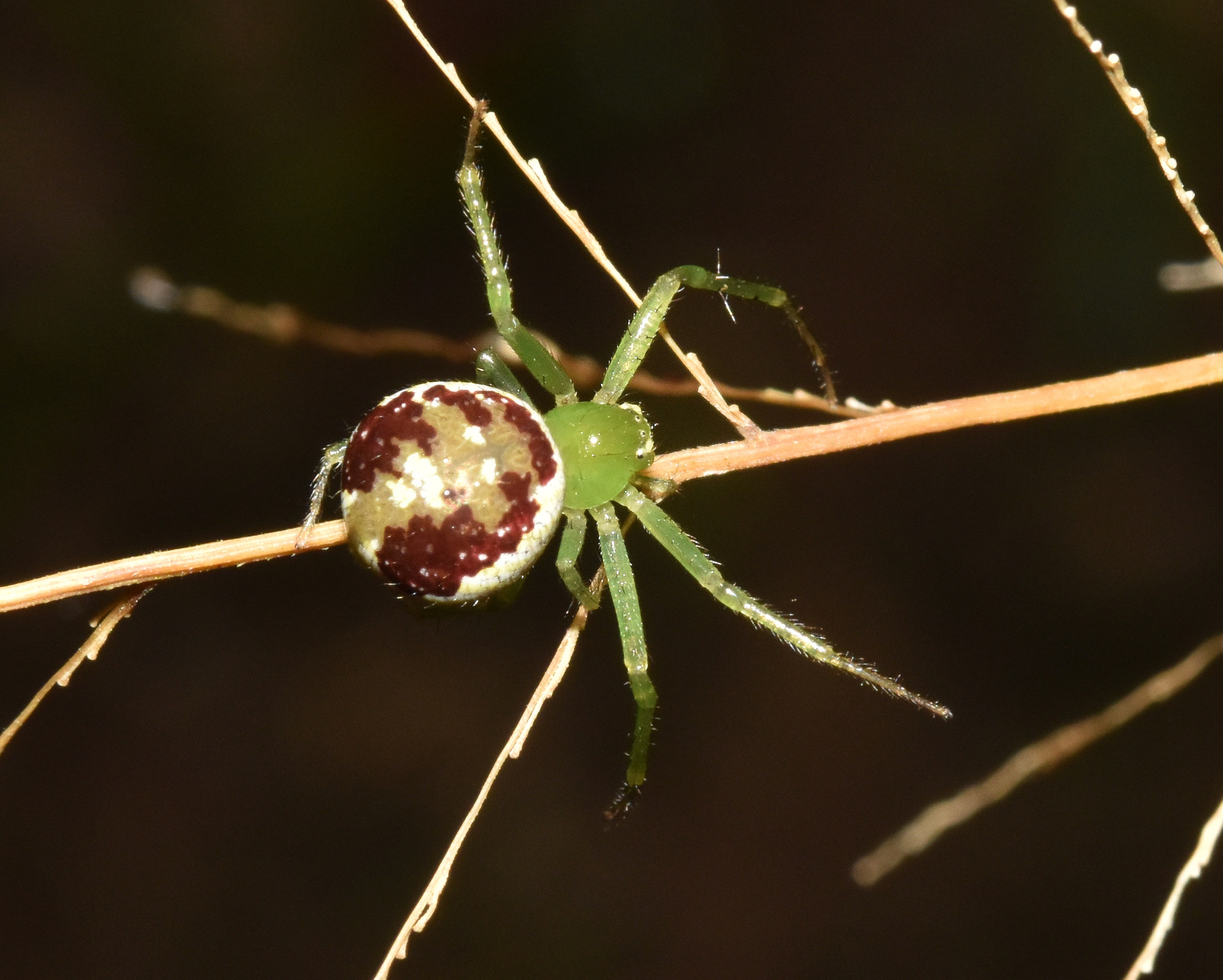
S. langheldi

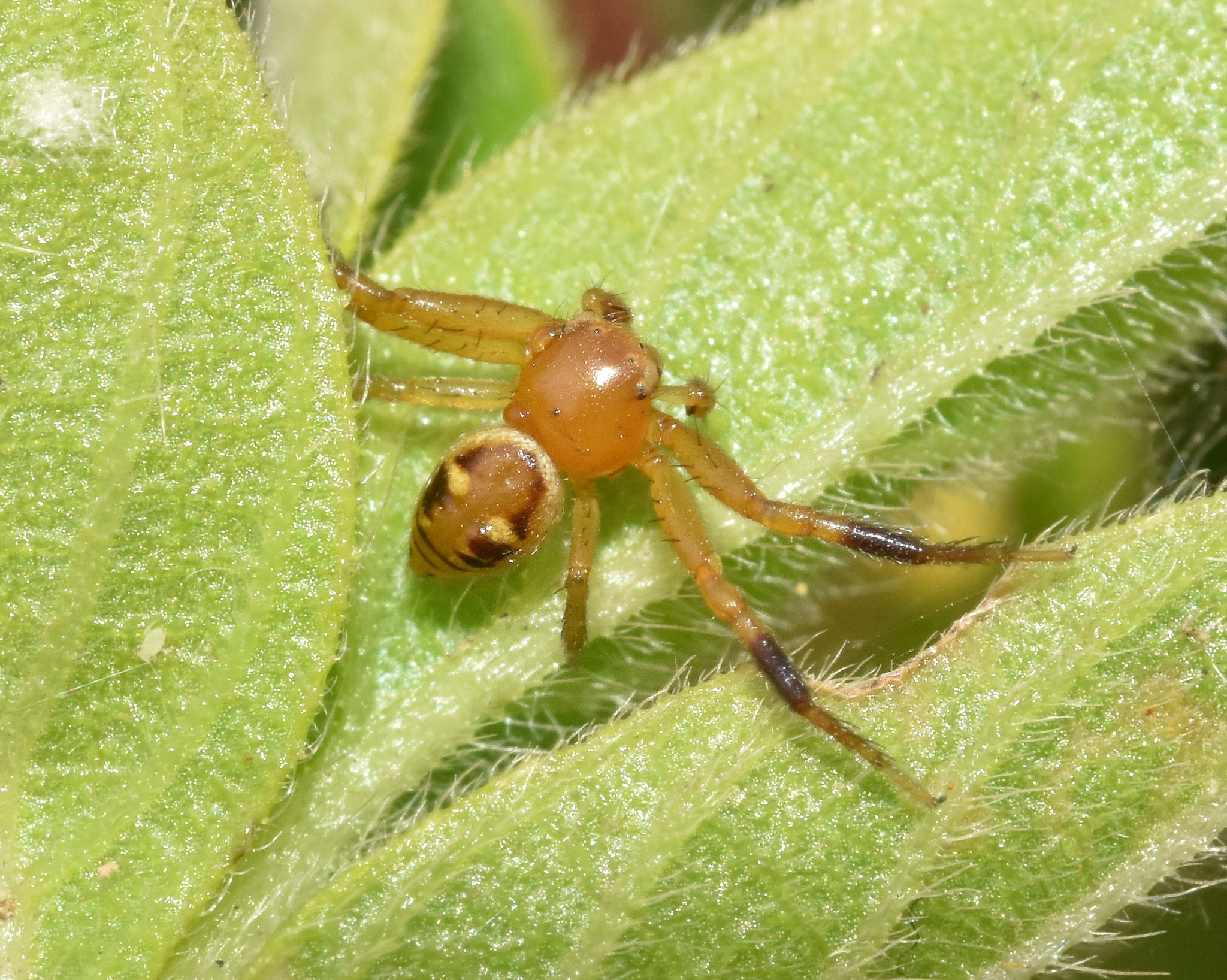
S. mandibulare

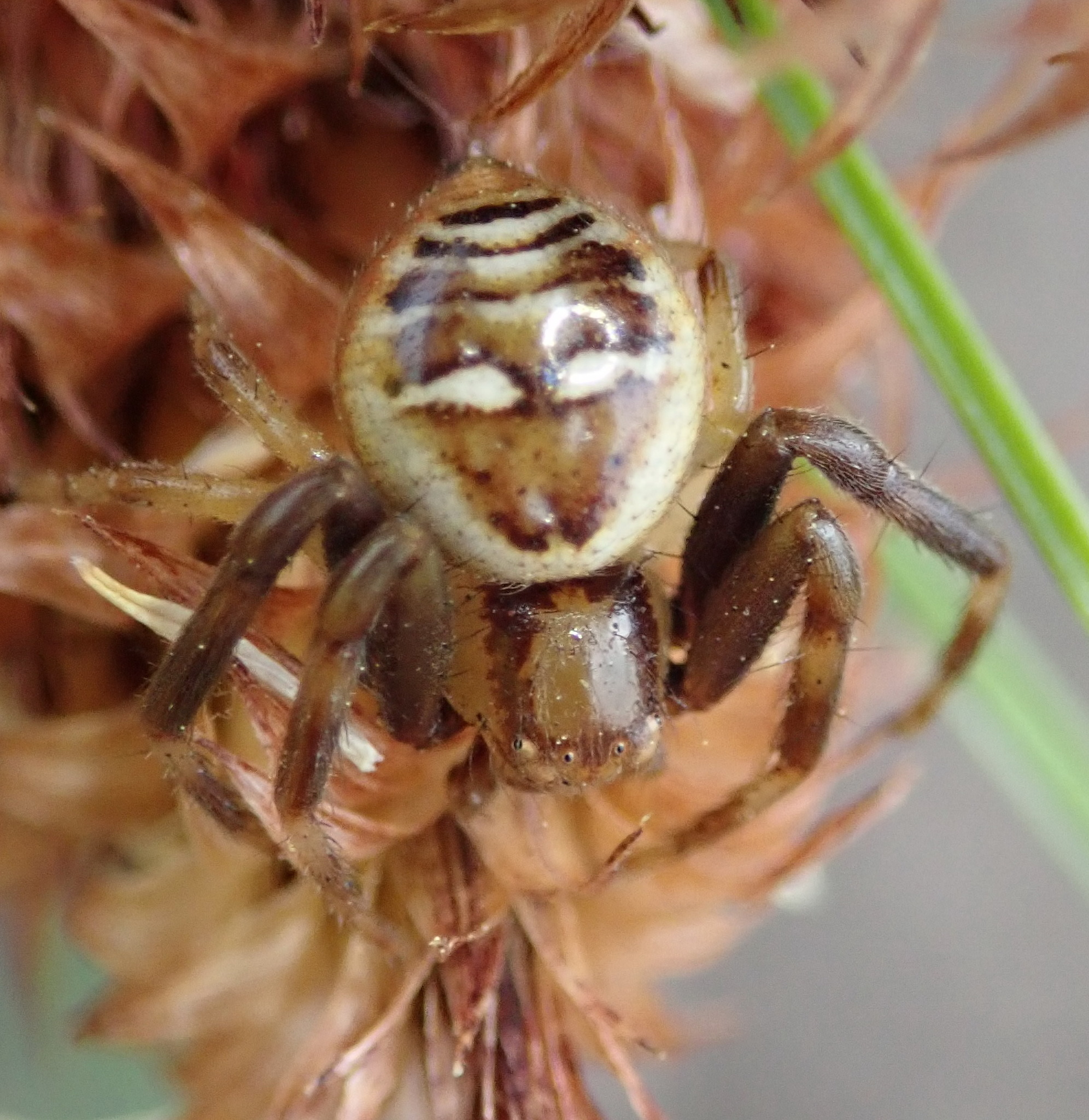
S. marlothi
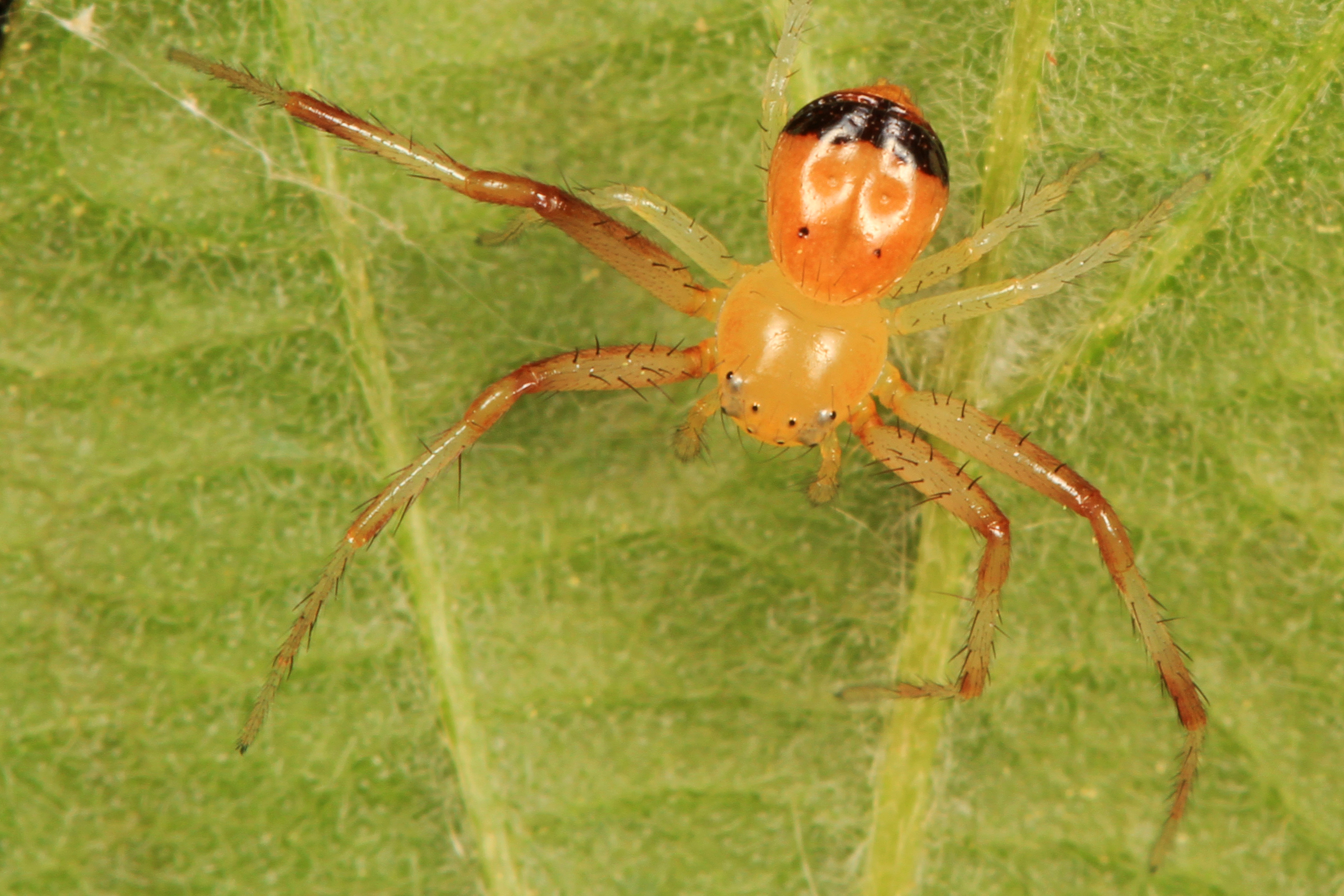
S. parvulum

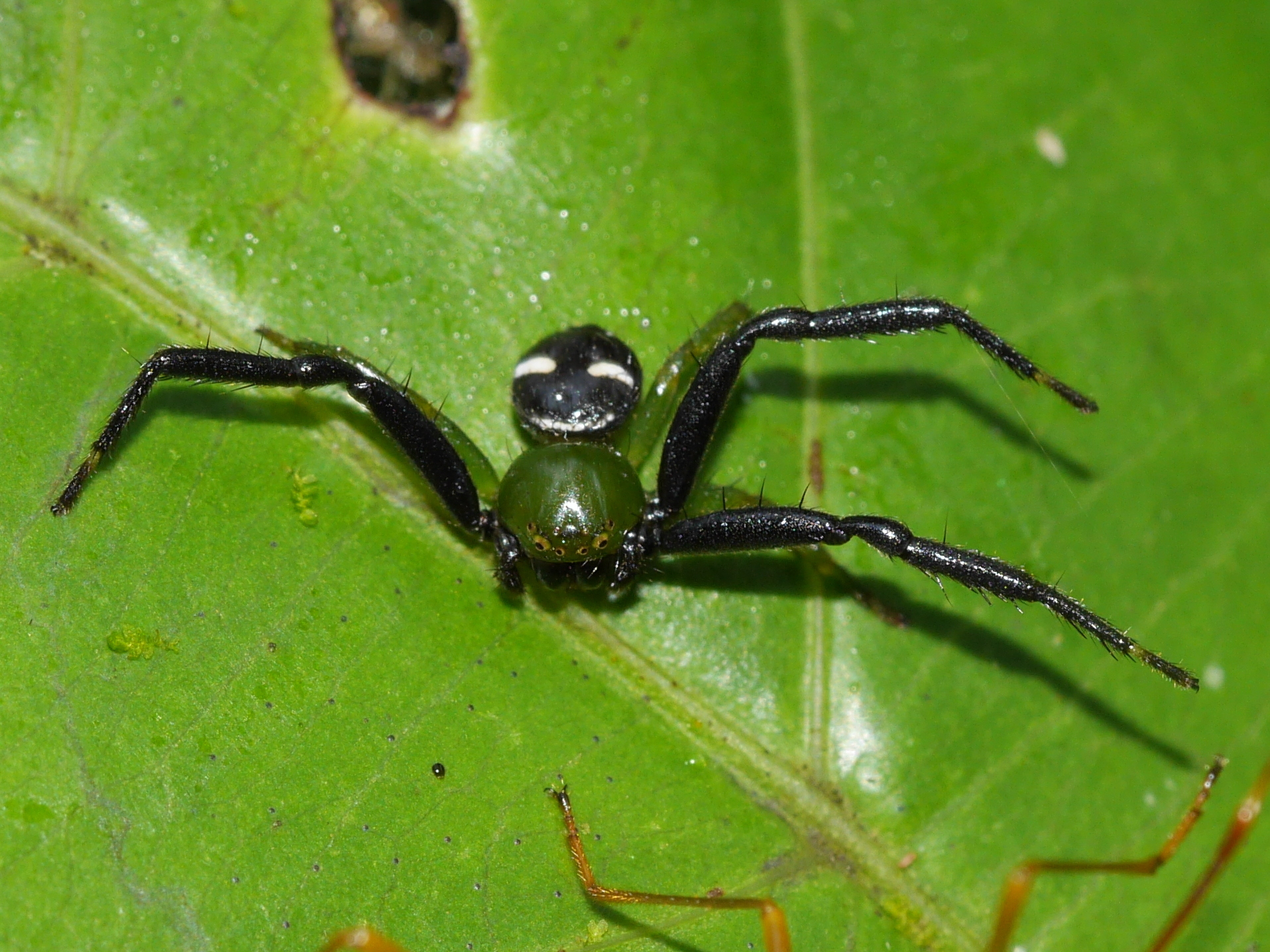
S. revolutum

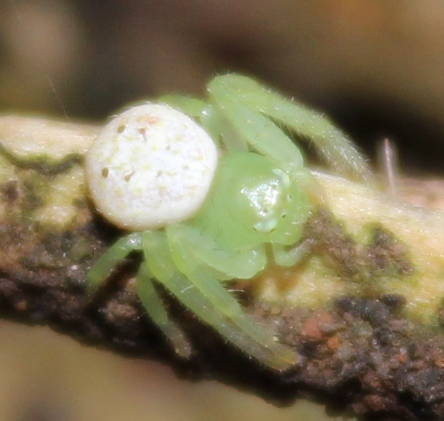
S. riflense

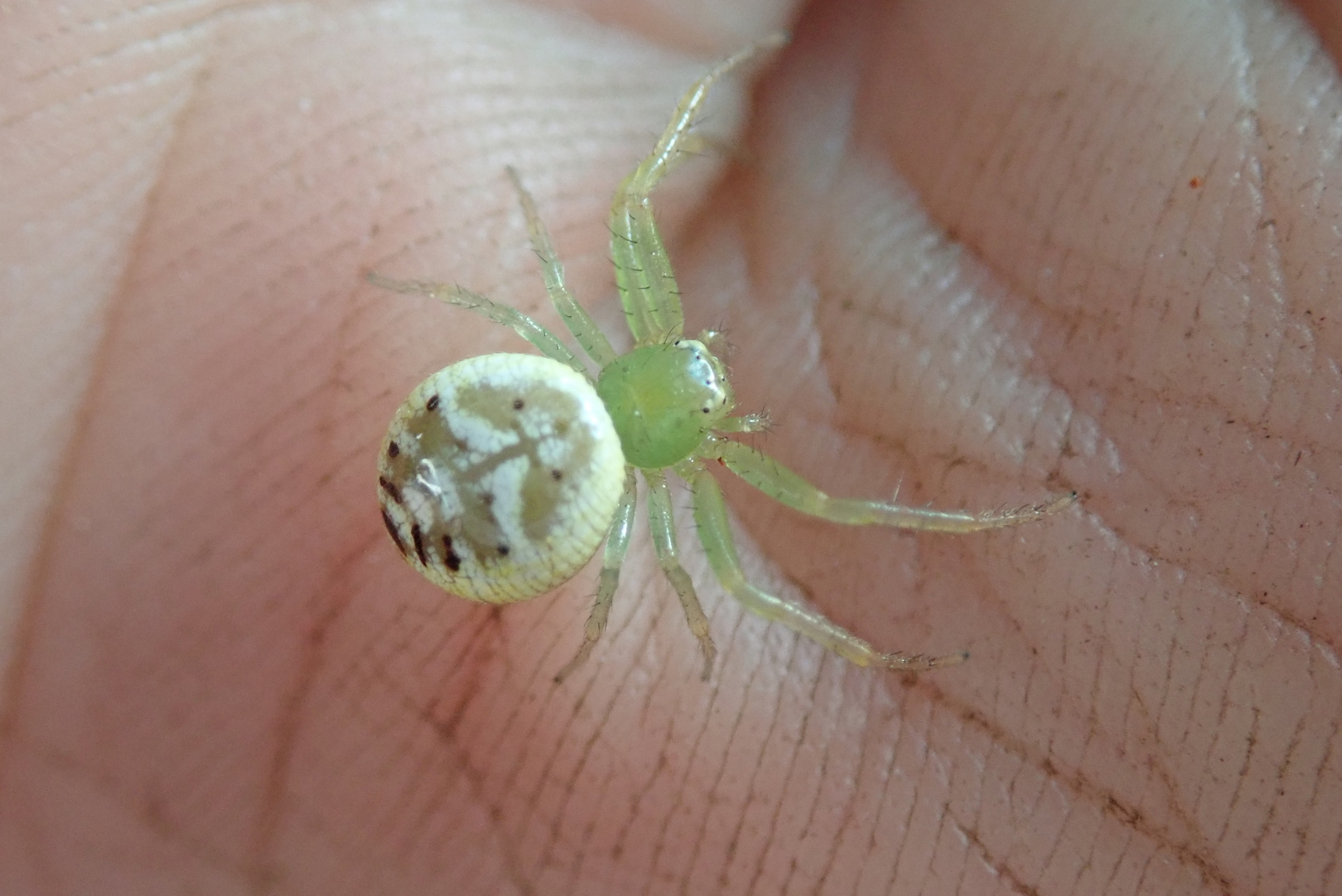
S. simoneae

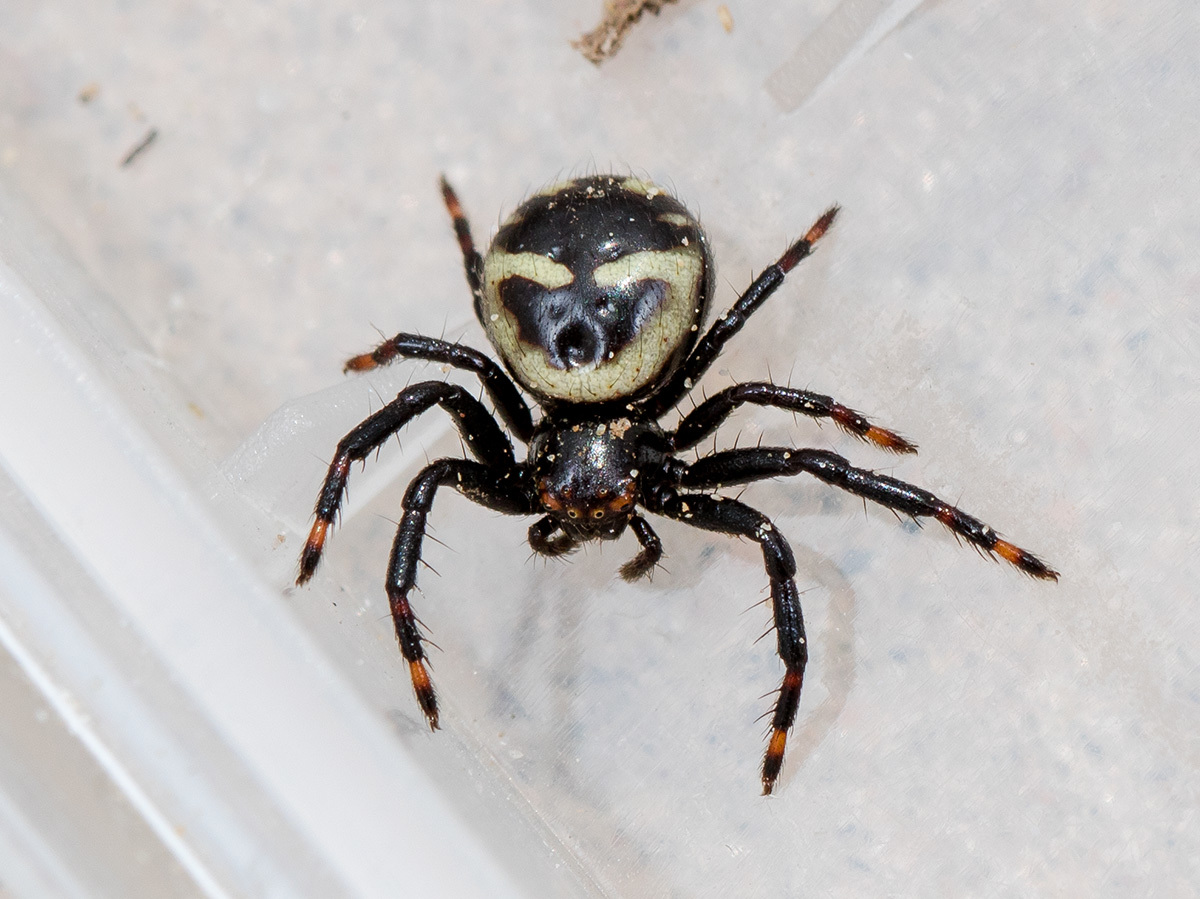
S. utotchkini

Complete species list as of October 2025
- Synema abrahami Mello-Leitão, 1948 – Guyana
- Synema adjunctum O. Pickard-Cambridge, 1891 – Panama
- Synema aequinoctiale (Taczanowski, 1872) – Mexico, French Guiana
- Synema affinitatum O. Pickard-Cambridge, 1891 – Mexico to Brazil
- Synema albomaculatum Ono, 2001 – Bhutan
- Synema anatolicum Demir, Aktaş & Topçu, 2009 – North Macedonia, Bulgaria, Greece, Turkey, Iran
- Synema annulipes Dahl, 1907 – Tanzania
- Synema bariguiense Mello-Leitão, 1947 – Brazil
- Synema batarasa Barrion & Litsinger, 1995 – Philippines
- Synema bellum Soares, 1944 – Brazil
- Synema berlandi Lessert, 1919 – Ethiopia, Tanzania
- Synema bipunctatum (Taczanowski, 1872) – Brazil, French Guiana
- Synema bishopi Caporiacco, 1955 – Venezuela, French Guiana
- Synema bourgini Millot, 1942 – Guinea
- Synema buettneri Dahl, 1907 – Cameroon, Togo
- Synema camerunense Dahl, 1907 – Cameroon
- Synema candicans (O. Pickard-Cambridge, 1876) – Egypt
- Synema caucasicum Utochkin, 1960 – Georgia, Armenia, Azerbaijan
- Synema cervinum Schenkel, 1936 – China
- Synema chikunii Ono, 1983 – Japan
- Synema concolor Caporiacco, 1947 – Tanzania
- Synema conradti Dahl, 1907 – Cameroon
- Synema curvatum Dahl, 1907 – Kenya, Tanzania
- Synema decens (Karsch, 1878) – South Africa, Eswatini
- Synema decoratum Tikader, 1960 – India, China
- Synema diana (Audouin, 1826) – Tunisia to Saudi Arabia, Eritrea, Ethiopia, Tanzania, South Africa, Lesotho, Eswatini
- Synema fasciatum Mello-Leitão, 1929 – Brazil
- Synema fiebrigi Dahl, 1907 – Paraguay
- Synema fischeri Dahl, 1907 – Somalia
- Synema flavimanus Dahl, 1907 – Kenya
- Synema flavipes Dahl, 1907 – Togo
- Synema flavum Dahl, 1907 – Tanzania
- Synema flexuosum Dahl, 1907 – East Africa (no details)
- Synema fuelleborni Dahl, 1907 – Tanzania
- Synema fuscomandibulatum Petrunkevitch, 1925 – Panama
- Synema glaucothorax Piza, 1934 – Brazil
- Synema globosum (Fabricius, 1775) – Europe, North Africa, Turkey, Caucasus, Russia (Europe to Far East), Israel, Iran, Kazakhstan, Central Asia, China, Korea, Japan (type species)
  - S. g. canariense Dahl, 1907 – Canary Islands
- Synema gracilipes Dahl, 1907 – Kenya
- Synema guiyang J. S. Zhang, Lu & Yu, 2022 – China
- Synema haemorrhoidale Dahl, 1907 – Paraguay
- Synema haenschi Dahl, 1907 – Guatemala, Brazil
- Synema helvolum Simon, 1907 – Guinea-Bissau
- Synema hildebrandti Dahl, 1907 – Madagascar
- Synema hirtipes Dahl, 1907 – Zimbabwe
- Synema illustre Keyserling, 1880 – Peru
- Synema imitatrix (Pavesi, 1883) – Ethiopia, Mozambique, South Africa, Eswatini
- Synema inexpectatum Seropian, Bulbulashvili, Makharadze & Baznikin, 2024 – Georgia
- Synema interjectivum Mello-Leitão, 1947 – Brazil
- Synema jaspideum Simon, 1907 – Sierra Leone, Equatorial Guinea (Bioko)
- Synema lanceolatum Mello-Leitão, 1929 – Brazil
- Synema langheldi Dahl, 1907 – Somalia, Tanzania, South Africa
- Synema laticeps Dahl, 1907 – Tanzania
- Synema latispinum Keyserling, 1883 – Peru
- Synema latissimum Dahl, 1907 – Togo
- Synema lineatum Thorell, 1895 – Singapore
- Synema longipes Dahl, 1907 – Togo
- Synema longispinosum Dahl, 1907 – Tanzania
- Synema lopezi Jiménez, 1988 – Mexico
- Synema lunulatum Dahl, 1907 – Madagascar
- Synema luridum Keyserling, 1880 – Peru
- Synema luteovittatum Keyserling, 1891 – Brazil
- Synema maculatovittatum Caporiacco, 1954 – French Guiana
- Synema maculosum O. Pickard-Cambridge, 1891 – Guatemala, Panama
- Synema madidum O. Pickard-Cambridge, 1895 – Mexico
- Synema mandibulare Dahl, 1907 – Tanzania, South Africa
- Synema marcidum Simon, 1907 – Guinea-Bissau
- Synema marlothi Dahl, 1907 – South Africa, Lesotho
- Synema multipunctatum (Simon, 1895) – Yemen, DR Congo, Guinea
- Synema mysorense Tikader, 1980 – India
- Synema nangoku Ono, 2002 – China, Japan
- Synema neomexicanum Gertsch, 1939 – United States
- Synema nigrianum Mello-Leitão, 1929 – Venezuela to Brazil
- Synema nigriventer Dahl, 1907 – Tanzania
- Synema nigrotibiale Lessert, 1919 – Tanzania, Botswana, Mozambique, South Africa, Yemen
- Synema nigrum Keyserling, 1880 – Peru
- Synema nitidulum Simon, 1929 – Brazil
- Synema obscurifrons Dahl, 1907 – Madagascar
- Synema obscuripes Dahl, 1907 – Madagascar
- Synema opulentum Simon, 1886 – Vietnam, Indonesia (Sumatra)
  - S. o. birmanicum Thorell, 1887 – Myanmar
- Synema ornatum (Thorell, 1875) – Hungary, Albania, Ukraine, Russia (Europe, Caucasus), Azerbaijan
- Synema palliatum O. Pickard-Cambridge, 1891 – Panama
- Synema papuanellum Strand, 1913 – New Guinea
- Synema paraense Mello-Leitão, 1929 – Brazil
- Synema parvulum (Hentz, 1847) – United States, Mexico
- Synema pauciaculeis Caporiacco, 1947 – Tanzania
- Synema pereirai Soares, 1943 – Brazil
- Synema pichoni Schenkel, 1963 – China
- Synema plorator (O. Pickard-Cambridge, 1872) – Eastern Europe, Tunesia, Middle East, Caucasus, Iran to Central Asia
- Synema pluripunctatum Mello-Leitão, 1929 – Brazil
- Synema pusillum Caporiacco, 1955 – Venezuela
- Synema putum O. Pickard-Cambridge, 1891 – Guatemala
- Synema quadratum Mello-Leitão, 1929 – Brazil
- Synema quadrifasciatum Dahl, 1907 – Tanzania
- Synema quadrimaculatum Roewer, 1961 – Senegal
- Synema reimoseri Lessert, 1928 – Congo
- Synema revolutum Tang & Li, 2010 – China, India
- Synema riflense Strand, 1909 – South Africa
- Synema rubromaculatum Keyserling, 1880 – Colombia, Brazil
- Synema scalare Strand, 1913 – Uganda
- Synema scheffleri Dahl, 1907 – Kenya
- Synema schulzi Dahl, 1907 – Brazil
- Synema setiferum Mello-Leitão, 1929 – Brazil
- Synema simoneae Lessert, 1919 – Tanzania, South Africa, Lesotho
- Synema socium O. Pickard-Cambridge, 1891 – Panama
- Synema spinosum Mello-Leitão, 1929 – Brazil
- Synema spirale Dahl, 1907 – South America
- Synema steckeri Dahl, 1907 – Togo, Sudan
- Synema subabnorme Caporiacco, 1947 – Uganda
- Synema suteri Dahl, 1907 – New Zealand
- Synema tadzhikistanicum Utochkin, 1960 – Central Asia
- Synema ternetzi Mello-Leitão, 1939 – Paraguay
- Synema tibiale Dahl, 1907 – Malawi
- Synema togoense Dahl, 1907 – Togo
- Synema tricalcaratum Mello-Leitão, 1929 – Brazil
- Synema trimaculosum Schmidt, 1956 – Ecuador
- Synema utotchkini Marusik & Logunov, 1995 – North Macedonia, Turkey, Russia (Europe, West Siberia), Kazakhstan, Kyrgyzstan
- Synema vachoni Jézéquel, 1964 – Ivory Coast
- Synema valentineri Dahl, 1907 – Egypt
- Synema vallotoni Lessert, 1923 – Zimbabwe, South Africa
- Synema variabile Caporiacco, 1939 – Ethiopia
- Synema viridans (Banks, 1896) – United States
- Synema viridisterne Jézéquel, 1966 – Ivory Coast
- Synema vittatum Keyserling, 1880 – Peru
- Synema zonatum Tang & Song, 1988 – China
