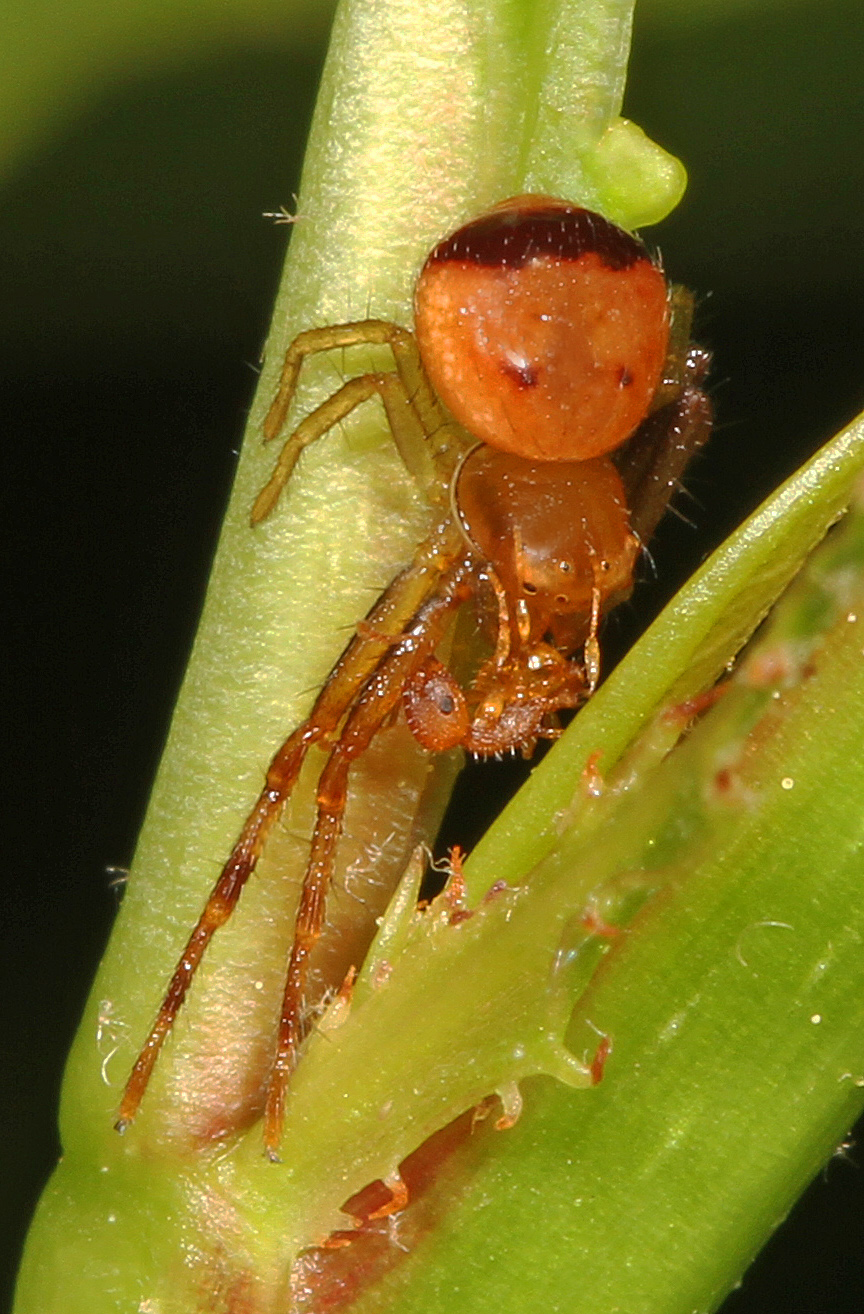
- with ant

Scientific classification
- Kingdom: Animalia
- Phylum: Arthropoda
- Subphylum: Chelicerata
- Class: Arachnida
- Order: Araneae
- Infraorder: Araneomorphae
- Family: Thomisidae
- Genus: Synema
- Species: S. parvulum

Binomial name
- Synema parvulum (Hentz, 1847)

= Synema parvulum =

Species of arachnid

Synema parvulum is a species of crab spider in the family Thomisidae. It is found in the United States and Mexico.

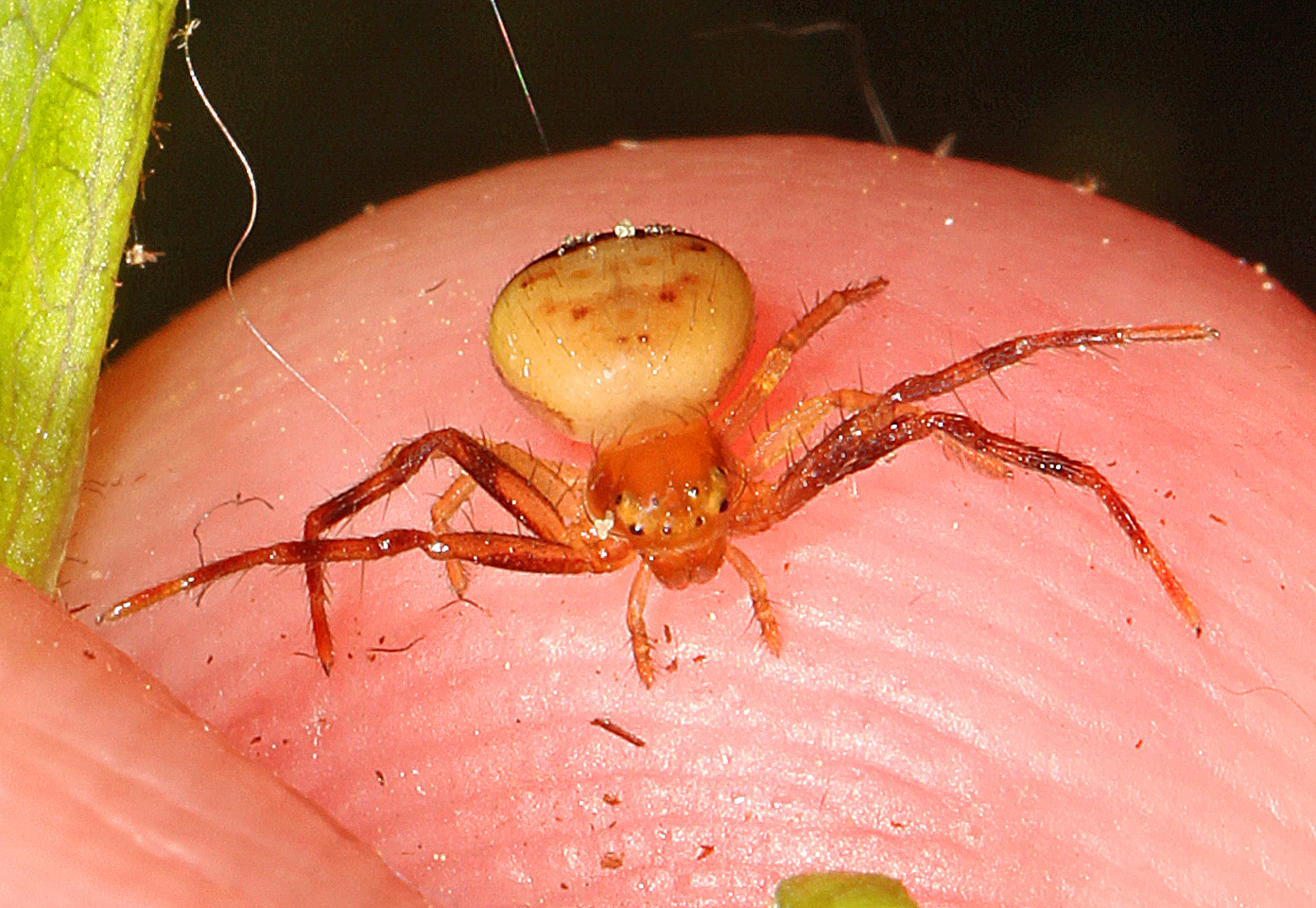

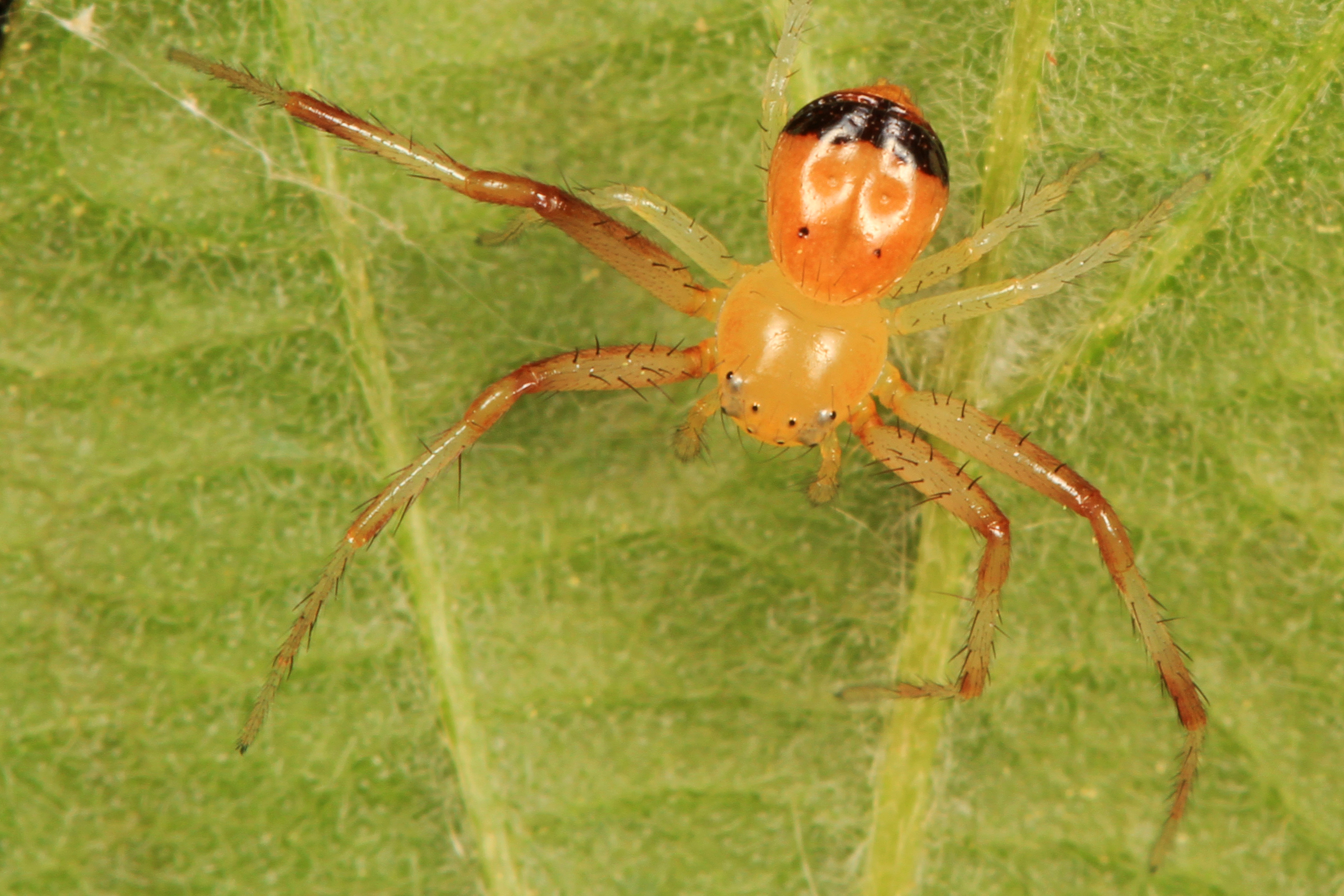
