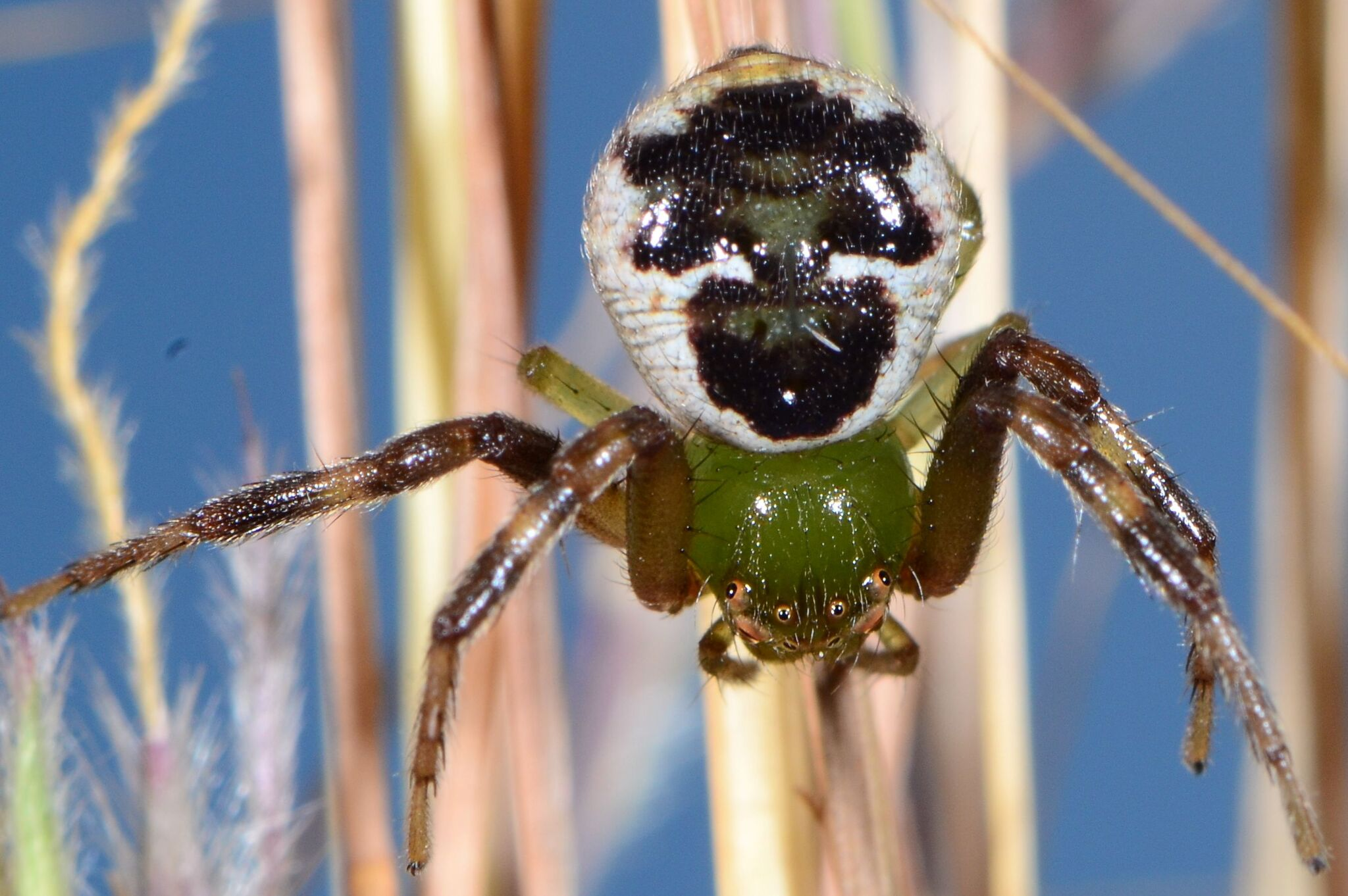
- female
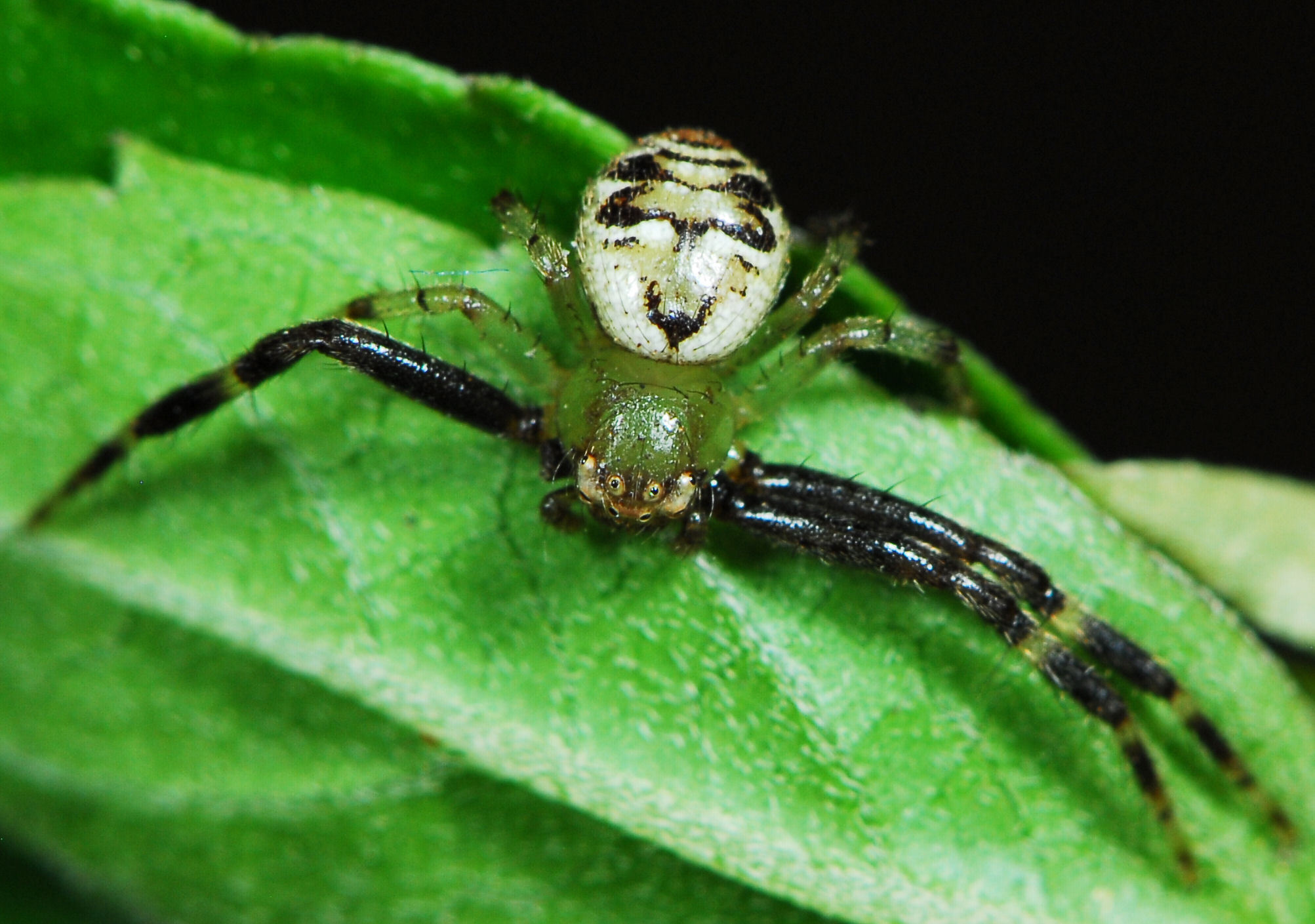
- female

Scientific classification
- Kingdom: Animalia
- Phylum: Arthropoda
- Subphylum: Chelicerata
- Class: Arachnida
- Order: Araneae
- Infraorder: Araneomorphae
- Family: Thomisidae
- Genus: Synema
- Species: S. nigrotibiale

Binomial name
- Synema nigrotibiale Lessert, 1919

= Synema nigrotibiale =

Dark legged Synema crab spider

Species of crab spider

Synema nigrotibiale is a species of crab spider in the family Thomisidae. The species is widely distributed across Africa and the Arabian Peninsula.

== Etymology ==
The specific name nigrotibiale is derived from Latin niger (black) and tibia (shin bone), referring to the characteristic black coloration of the tibiae on the front legs.

== Distribution ==
Synema nigrotibiale has been recorded from Tanzania, Botswana, Mozambique, South Africa, and Yemen.

== Habitat ==
The species is free-living on plants and is occasionally found inside flower corollas. In South Africa, it has been recorded from all floral biomes except the Desert and Succulent Karoo biomes, at elevations ranging from 1 to 1,951 meters above sea level.

== Description ==
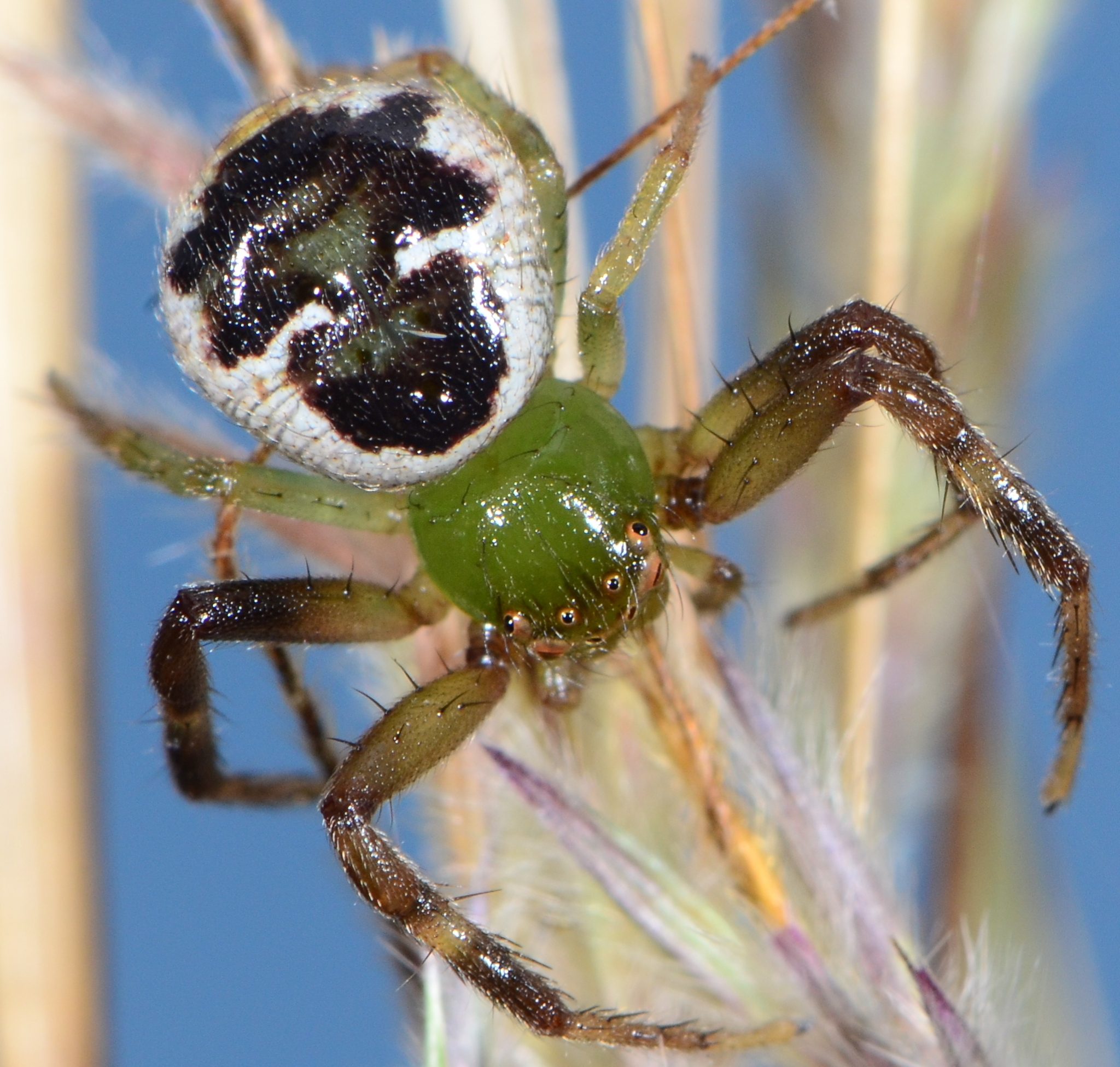
female

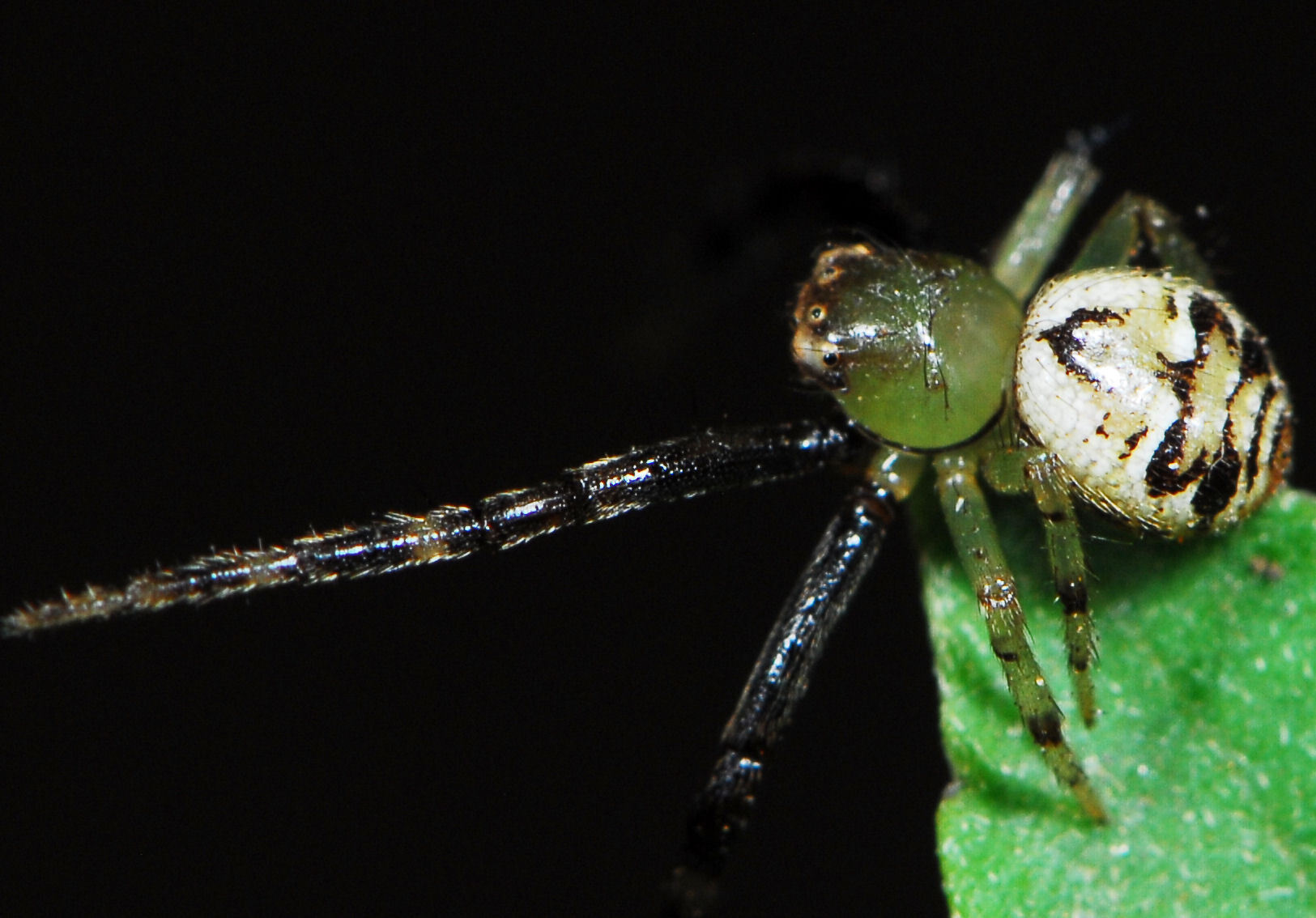
female

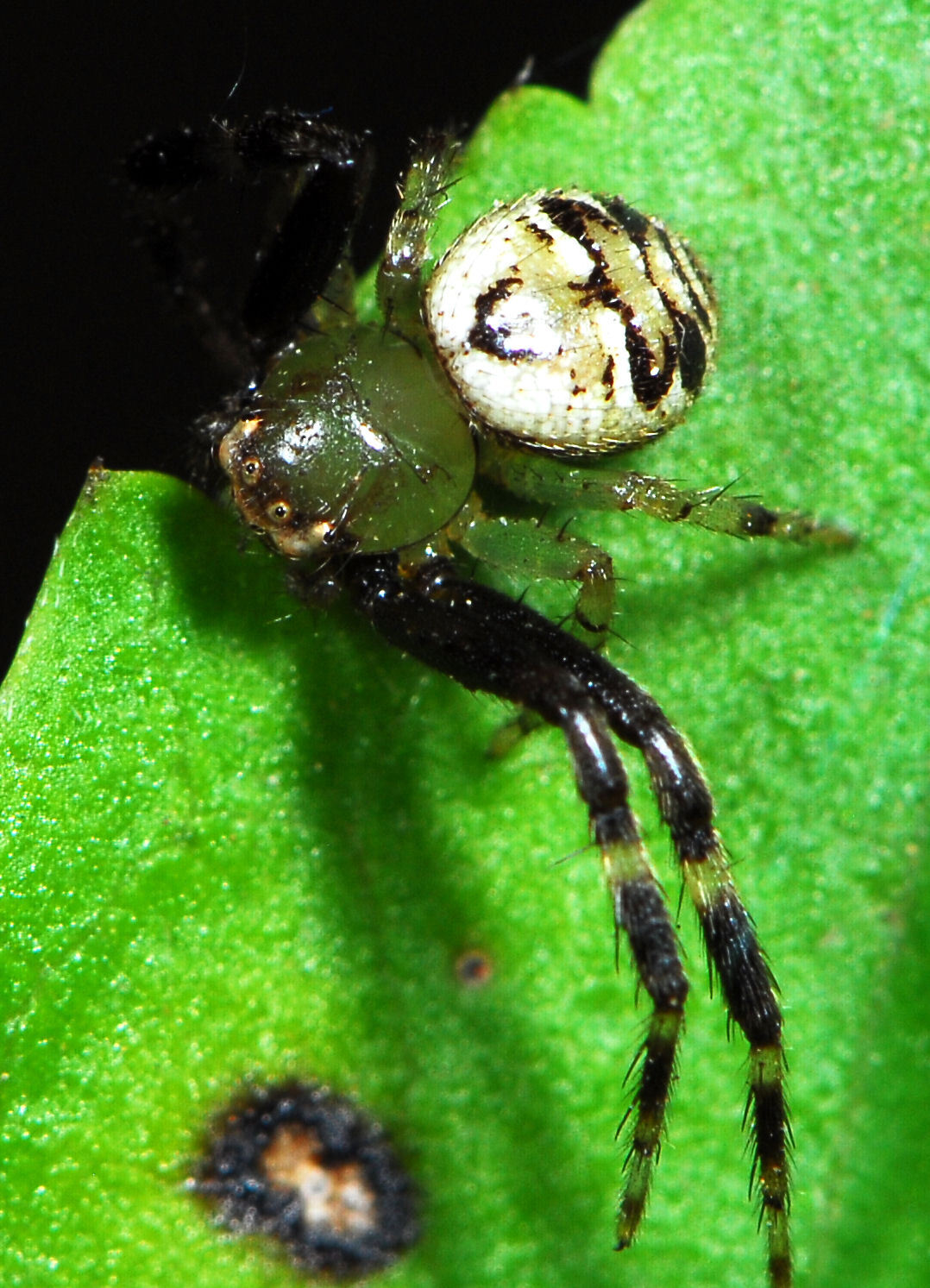
female

Synema nigrotibiale is easily recognizable by the distinctive black coloration of the anterior tibiae and the form of the tibial apophysis on the male pedipalps.

=== Male ===
The male has a body length of 3.4 mm and a cephalothorax that is tawny-orange with the ocular area spotted with brown. A brown longitudinal median line extends along the carapace but does not reach the posterior edge. The chelicerae are tawny-orange with yellowish maxillary blades and a blackish labium.

The legs show distinctive coloration patterns. Legs I and II are tawny-reddish, with the femora slightly tinted with blackish markings and the patellae marked with a small anterior apical spot and two inferior blackish spots. Most notably, the tibiae are black except for a narrow basal tawny-reddish ring. Legs III and IV are yellow, finely encircled with black at the joints.

The opisthosoma is greyish-testaceous, varying to white, with a distinctive black oval spot in the center of the dorsal surface. This spot is divided on each side toward the anterior third by a white transverse mark and generally divided posteriorly into four slightly procurved transverse streaks.

The pedipalp tibia is equipped with two apophyses. The inferior apophysis is cylindrical and directed obliquely forward on the bulb, curved internally and rounded at the extremity. The external apophysis is broad, directed obliquely forward and outward, and bifurcated with two compressed branches.

=== Female ===
The female remains undescribed in the literature, though habitus photographs have been published.

== Conservation status ==
Synema nigrotibiale is classified as Least Concern due to its wide geographical range across multiple African countries and Yemen. The species has been recorded in more than 15 protected areas and faces no known threats.
