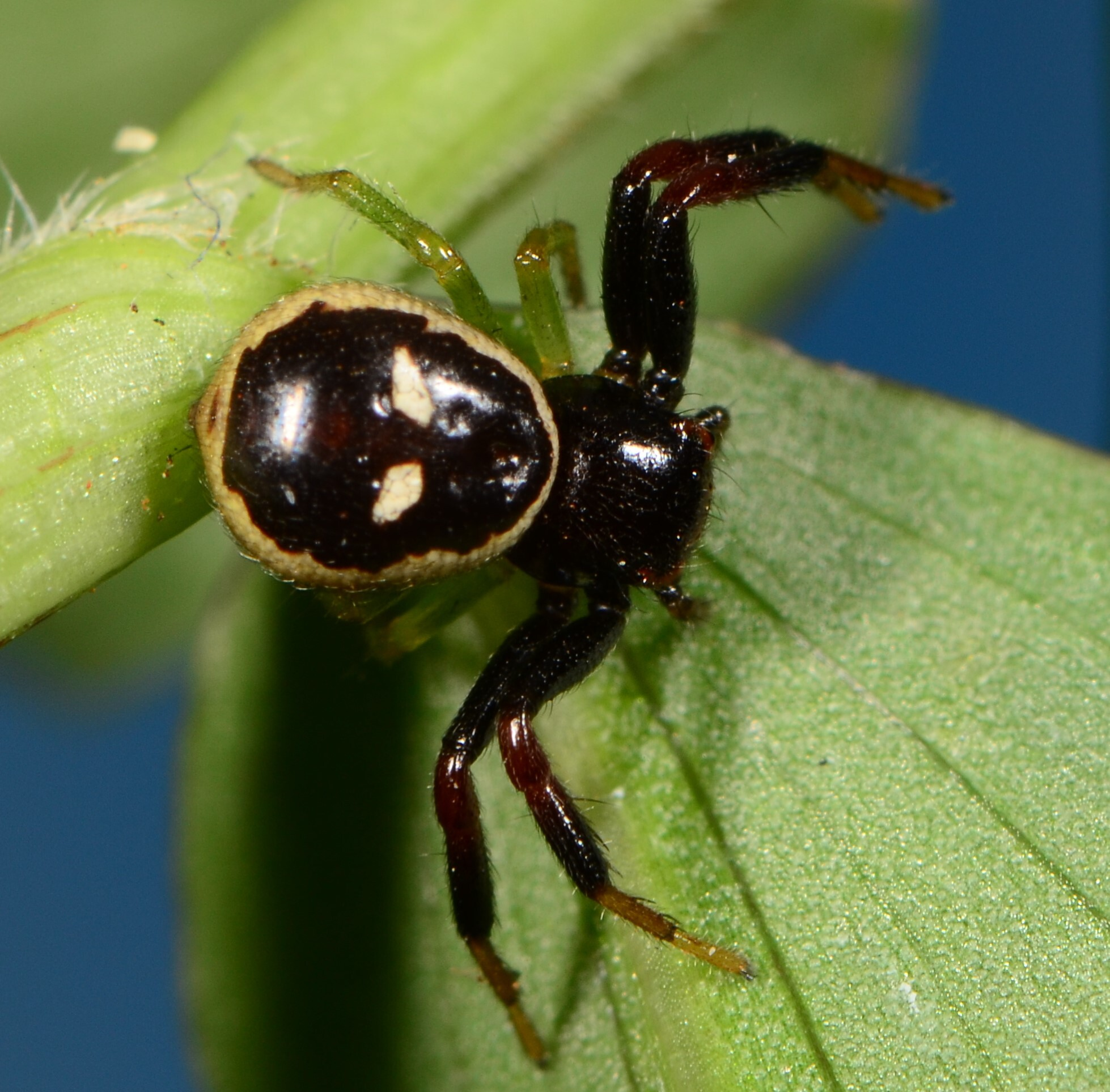
- female from South Africa
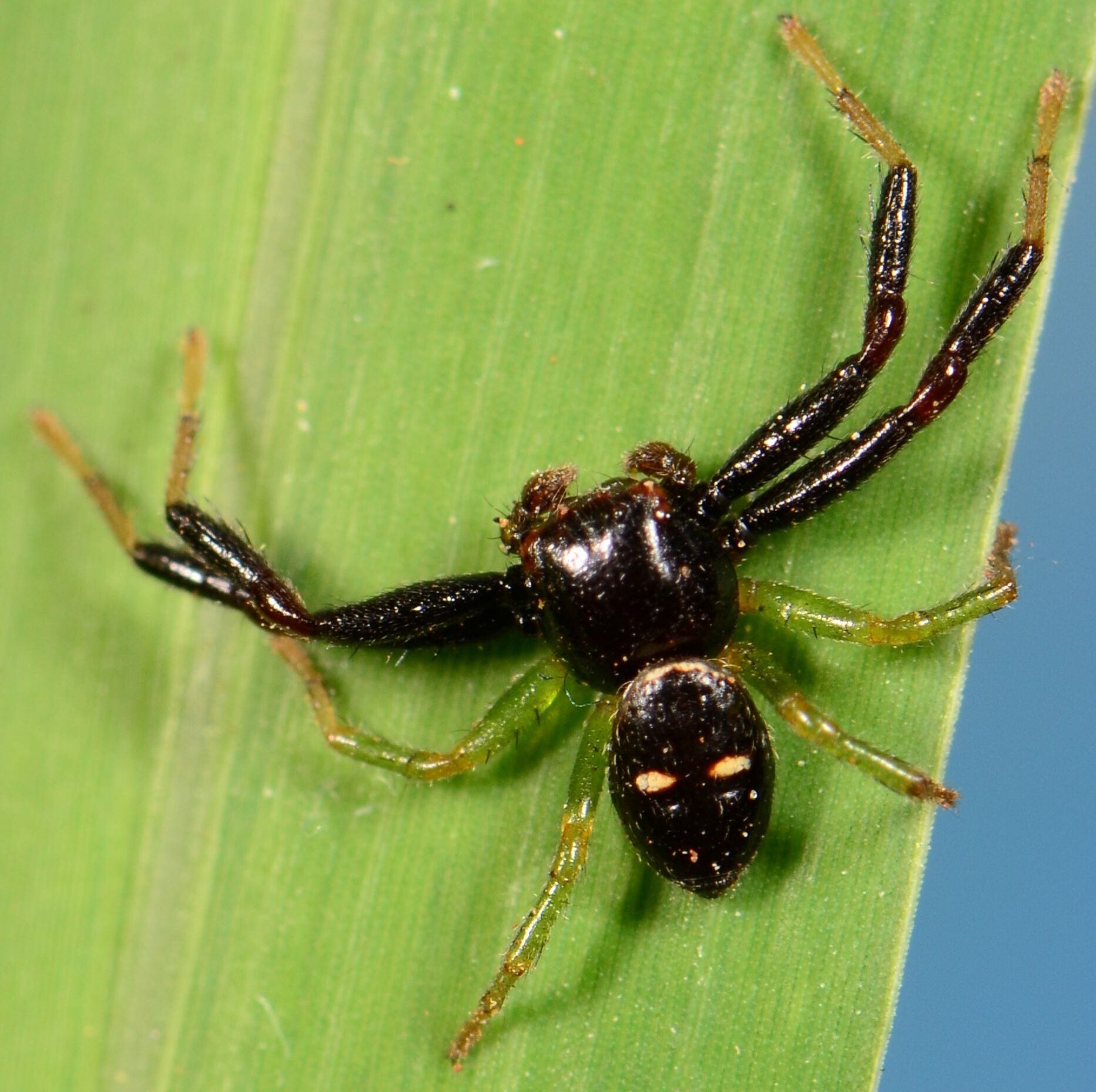
- male from South Africa

Scientific classification
- Kingdom: Animalia
- Phylum: Arthropoda
- Subphylum: Chelicerata
- Class: Arachnida
- Order: Araneae
- Infraorder: Araneomorphae
- Family: Thomisidae
- Genus: Synema
- Species: S. marlothi

Binomial name
- Synema marlothi Dahl, 1907

Synonyms
- Synaema (Synaema) marlothi Dahl, 1907

= Synema marlothi =

Marloth's Synema crab spider

Species of spider

Synema marlothi is a species of crab spider in the family Thomisidae. It is endemic to southern Africa, where it occurs in South Africa and Lesotho. The species is commonly known as Marloth's Synema crab spider.

== Etymology ==
The specific epithet marlothi honours the botanist Rudolf Marloth, who contributed significantly to the study of South African flora.

== Taxonomy ==
The species was first described by German arachnologist Friedrich Dahl in 1907 as Synaema (Synaema) marlothi.

The syntype specimens are deposited in the Museum für Naturkunde in Berlin, Germany.

== Distribution ==
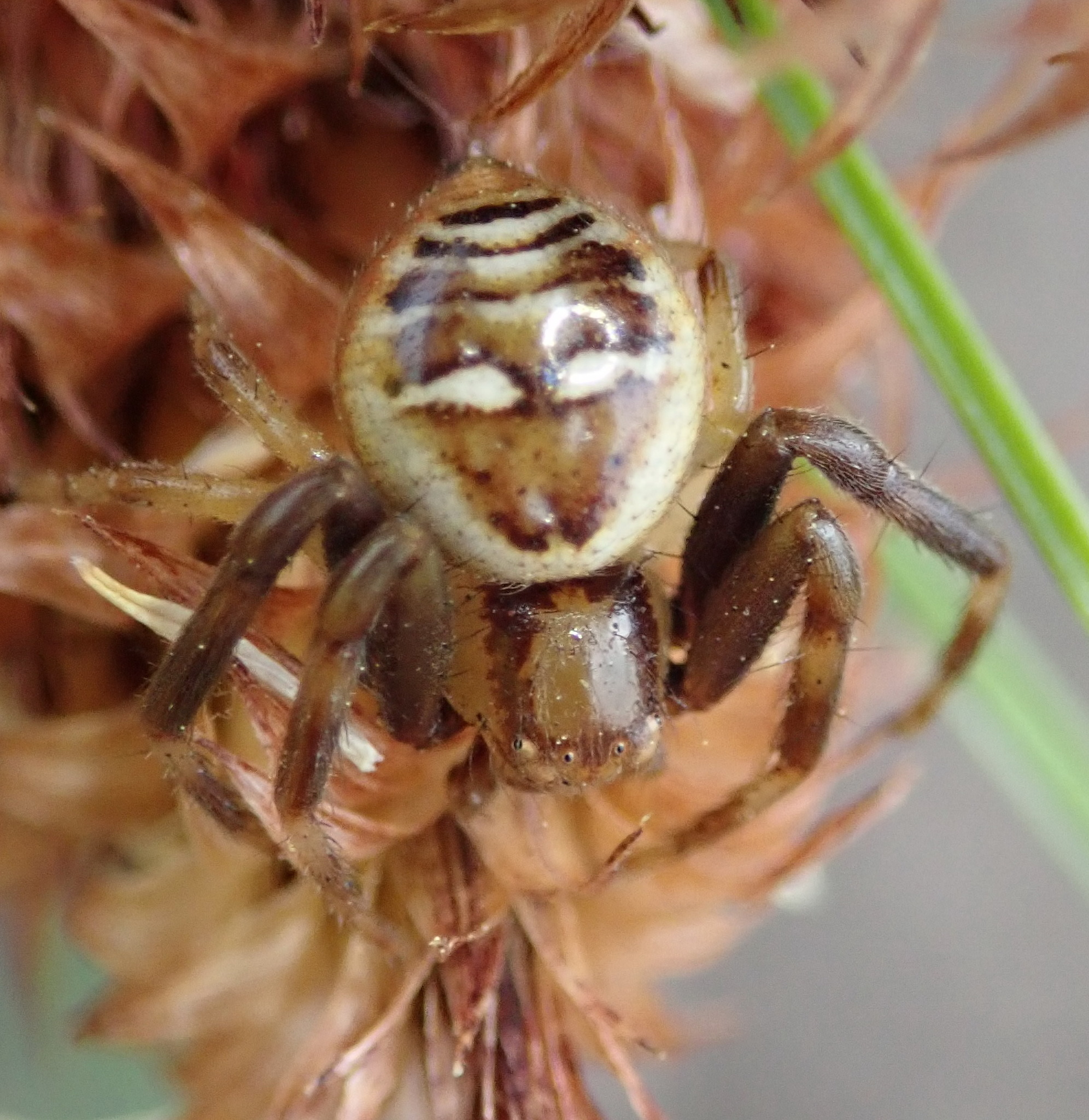
female

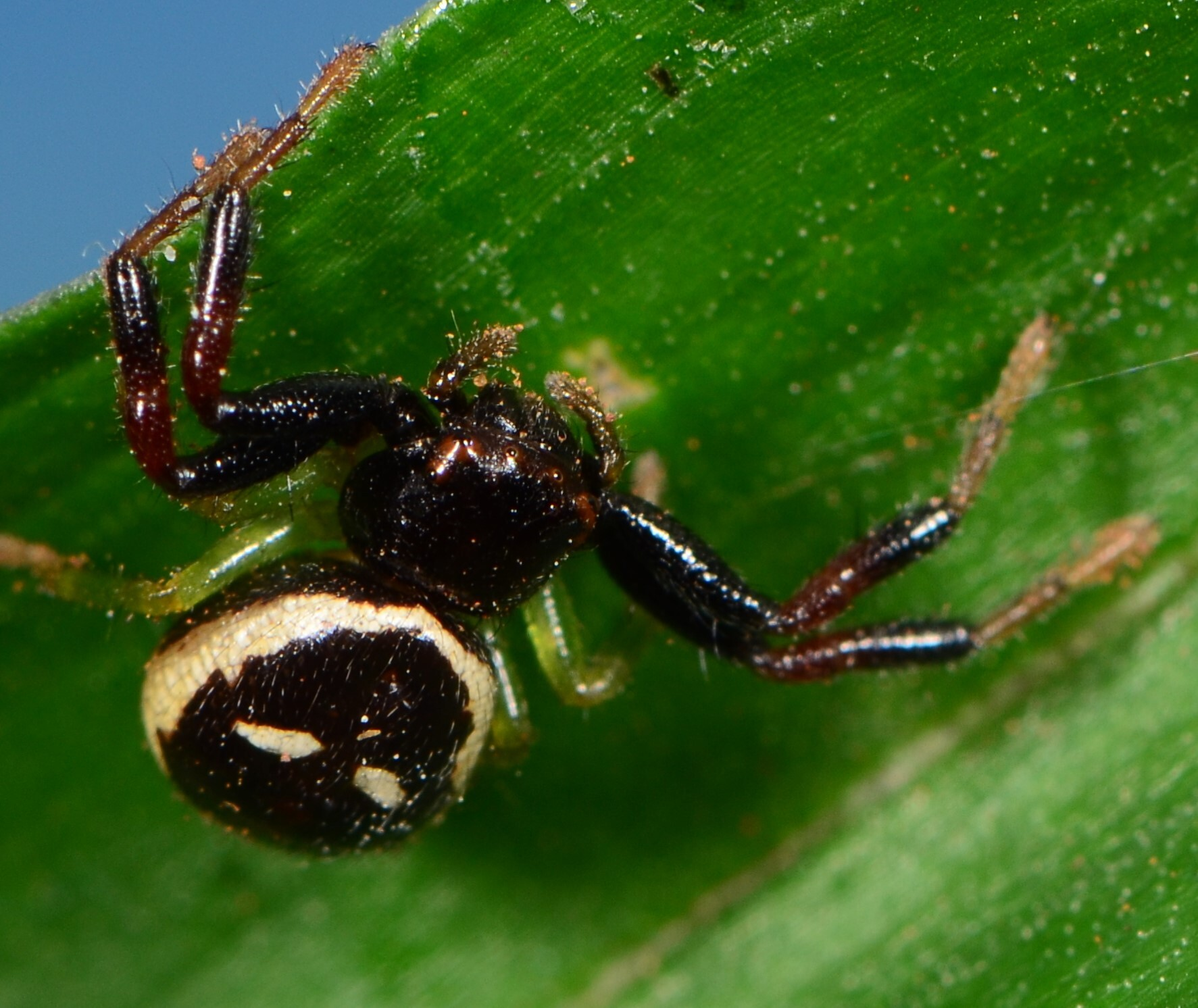
female

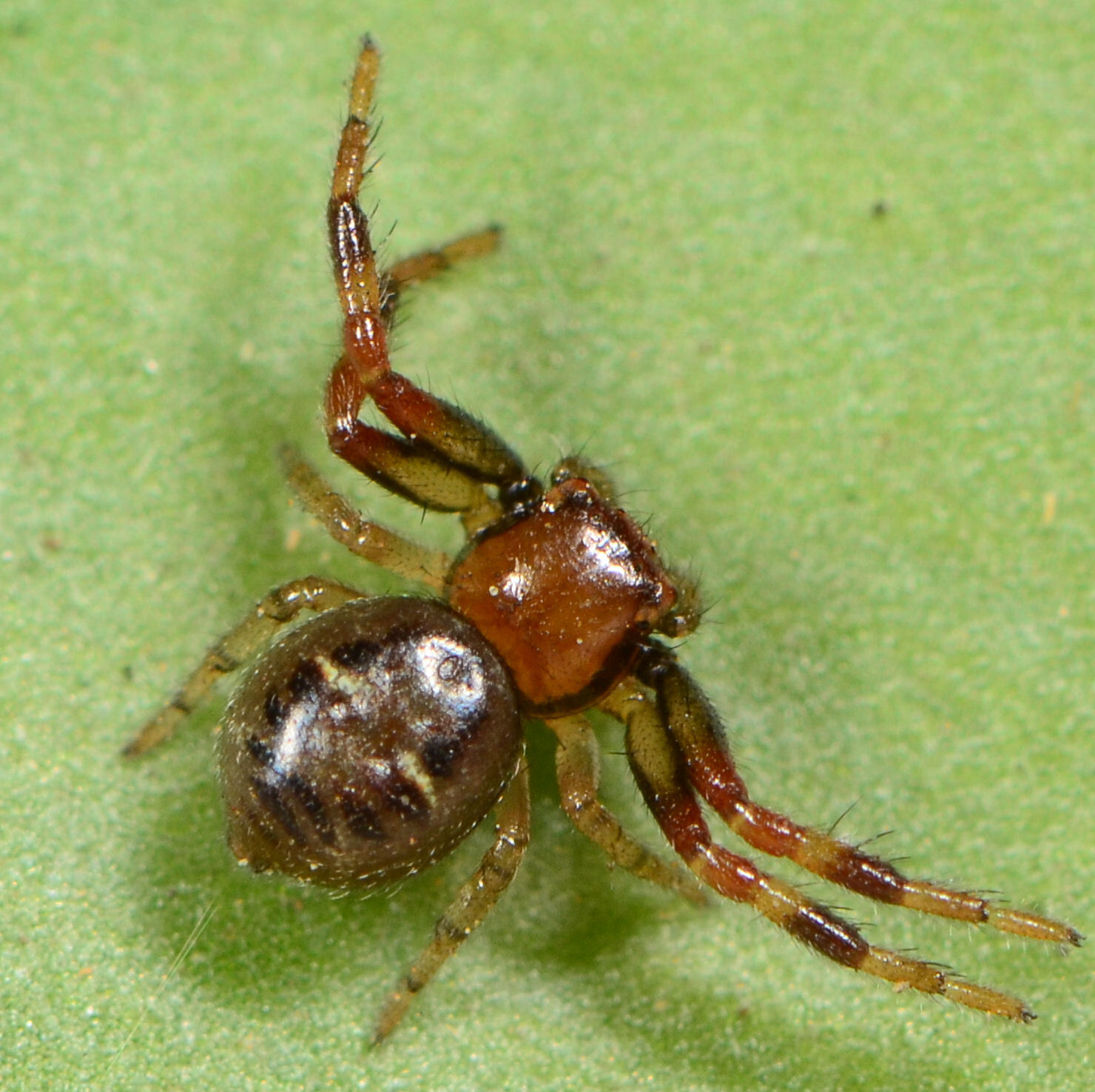
juvenile female

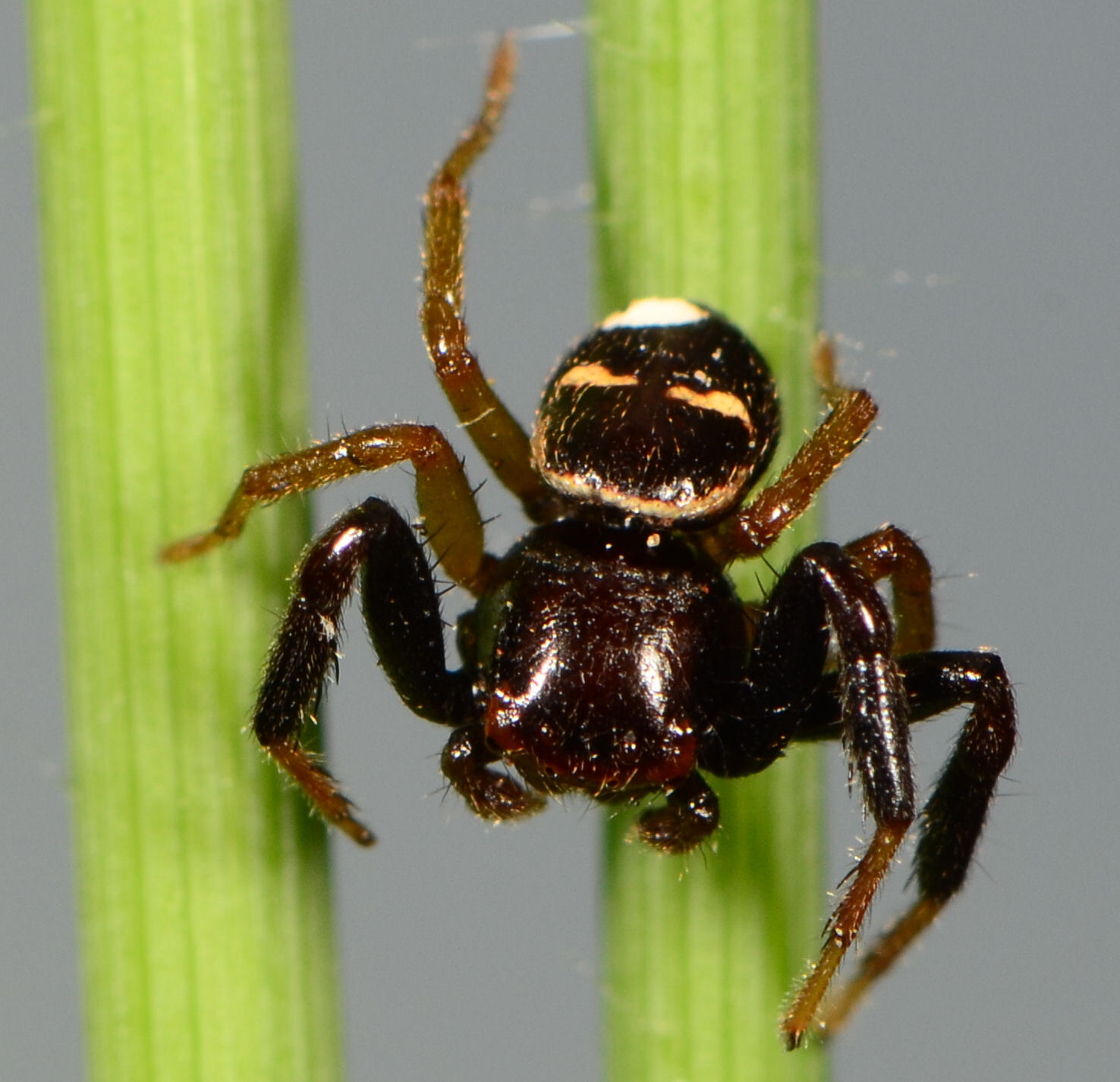
male

Synema marlothi has been recorded from multiple provinces across South Africa, as well as from Lesotho. In South Africa, the species has been found in the Eastern Cape, Gauteng, Mpumalanga, KwaZulu-Natal, and Western Cape provinces.

Notable localities include Addo Elephant National Park, Kruger National Park, Ndumo Game Reserve, and Table Mountain National Park. The species occurs at elevations ranging from 9 to 1,551 metres above sea level.

== Habitat and ecology ==
Synema marlothi is a free-living spider that inhabits vegetation and is occasionally found inside flower corollas. Notably, the species has also been recorded living on two species of carnivorous plants, Roridula dentata and Roridula gorgonias. On these plants, S. marlothi feeds on insects that become trapped by the plant's sticky leaf glands, representing an interesting ecological relationship between the spider and the carnivorous plants.

== Description ==
Like other members of the family Thomisidae, Synema marlothi is a crab spider with a laterally flattened body adapted for ambush predation. The species exhibits the characteristic laterigrade leg arrangement typical of crab spiders, with legs extending sideways from the body.

== Conservation ==
Synema marlothi is classified as Least Concern due to its wide distribution range across southern Africa. No known threats have been identified, and the species is recorded from several protected areas including national parks and game reserves.
