= Coprophagia =

Act of voluntarily ingesting feces

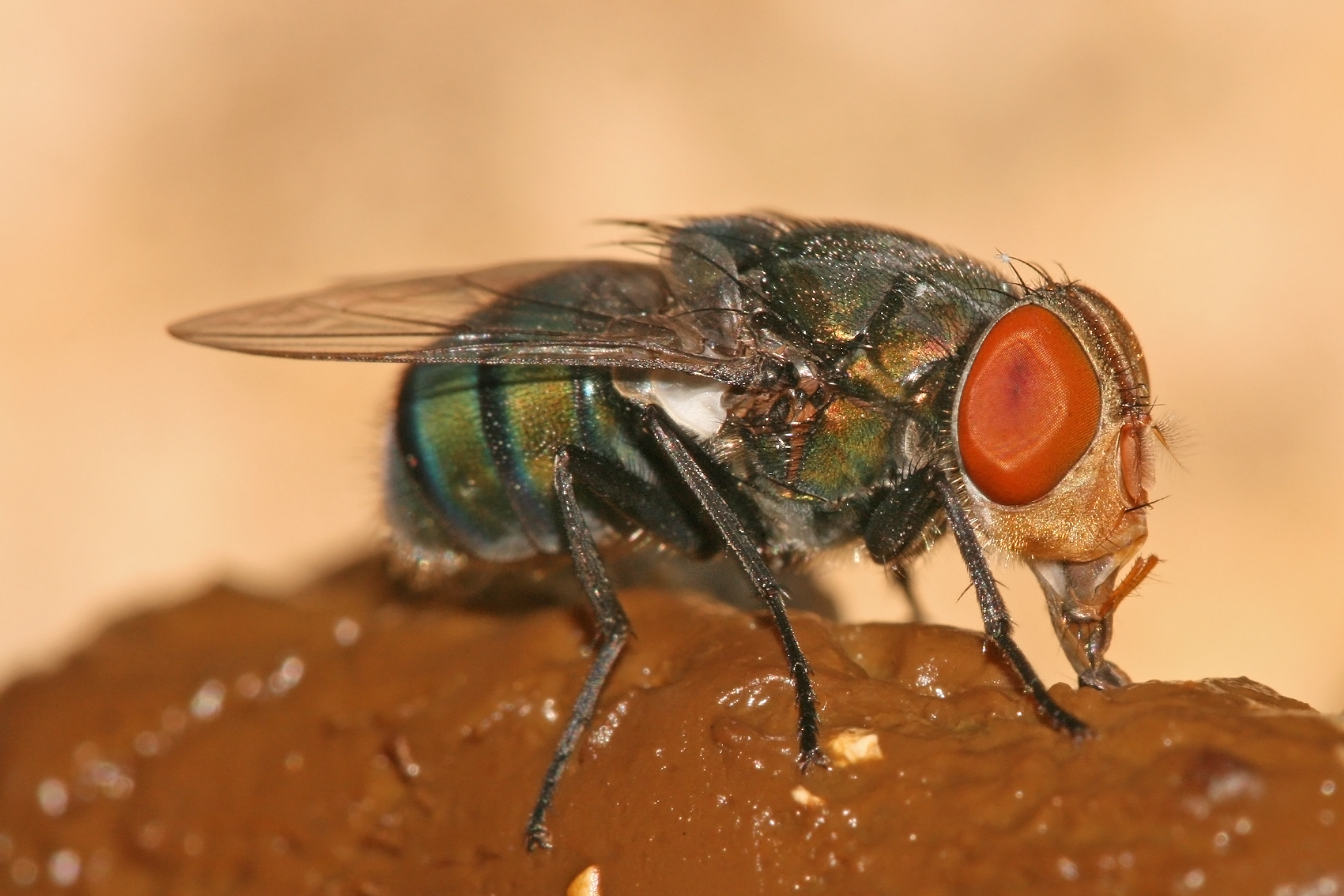
A female oriental latrine fly (Chrysomya megacephala) feeding on feces

Coprophagia (/ˌkɒprəˈfeɪdʒiə/ KOP-rə-FAY-jee-ə) or coprophagy (/kəˈprɒfədʒi/ kə-PROF-ə-jee) is the consumption of feces. The word is derived from the Ancient Greek κόπρος kópros "feces" and φαγεῖν phageîn "to eat". Coprophagy refers to many kinds of feces-eating, including eating feces of other species (heterospecifics), of other individuals (allocoprophagy), or one's own (autocoprophagy). Feces may be already deposited or taken directly from the anus. Some animal species eat feces as a normal behavior, but in most species, coprophagia indicates a pathological condition.

== Coprophagia by plants ==
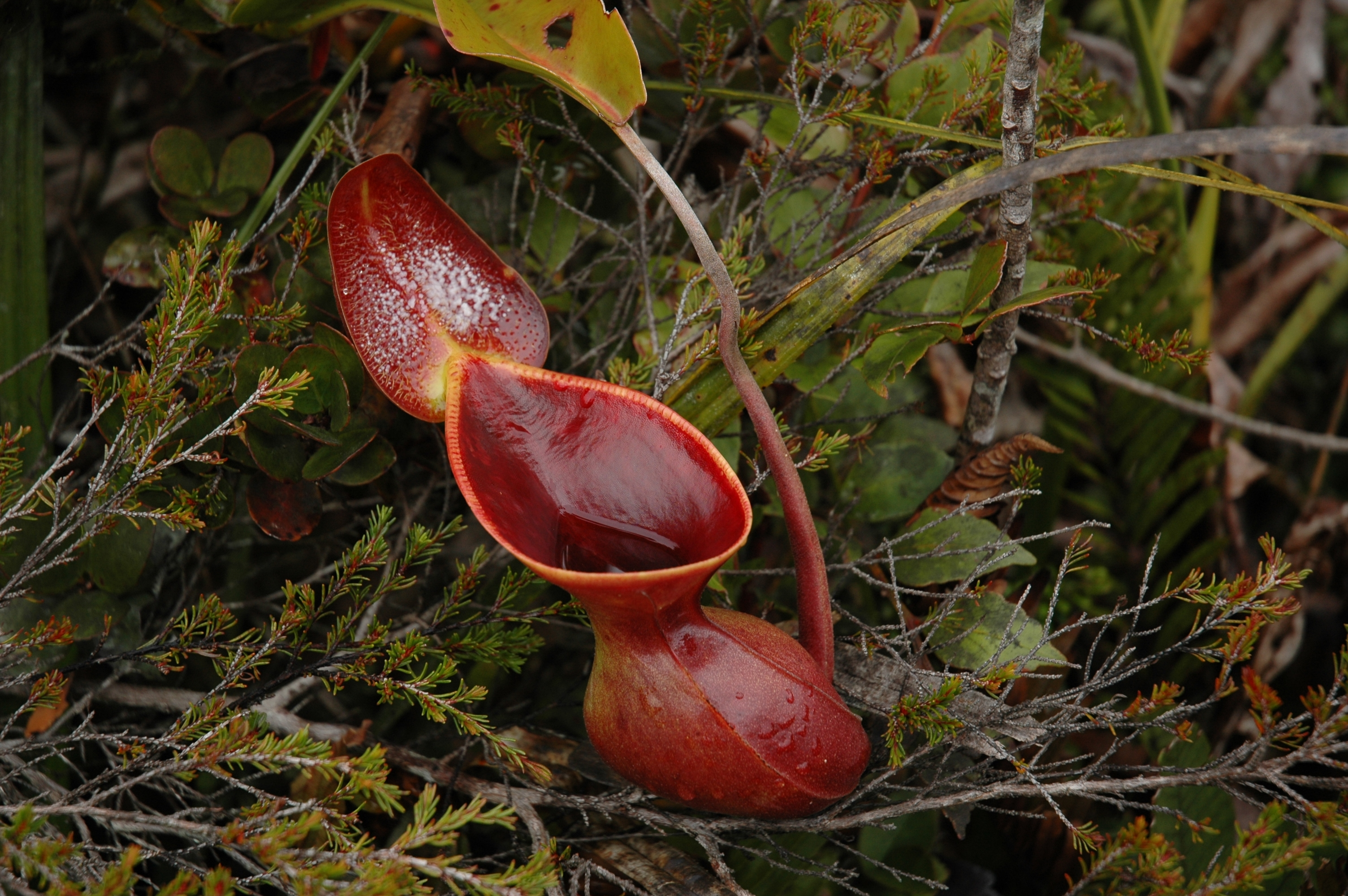
Nepenthes lowii pitcher

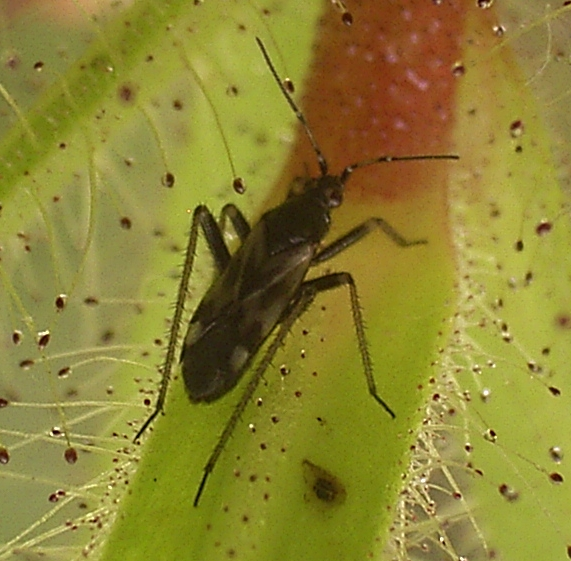
Pameridea roridulae on Roridula dentata

Some carnivorous plants, such as pitcher plants of the genus Nepenthes, obtain nutrition from the feces of commensal animals. Nepenthes lowii has evolved interdependence with tree shrews which feed on the plants secretions from the pitcher lid then defecate in the plant's pitchers. In the case of N. Lowii, the pitchers have evolved a toilet like shape to accommodate tree shrews who feed on the sweet, waxy, white substance on the pitcher lid then defecate into the pitchers.

Two species of proto-carnivorous plants in the genus Roridula trap and kill insect prey, then rely on a symbiosis with the insect species Pameridea roridulae, a jumping tree bug in the family Miridae. It has a symbiotic relationship with Roridula, where it feeds on trapped insects and its feces are absorbed through the leaves of the Roridula, giving the plant much-needed nutrients and nitrogen. Juvenile P. roridulae also pollinate the plant.

Manure is organic matter, mostly animal feces, that is used as organic fertilizer for plants in agriculture.

== Coprophagia by nonhuman animals ==
=== By invertebrates ===
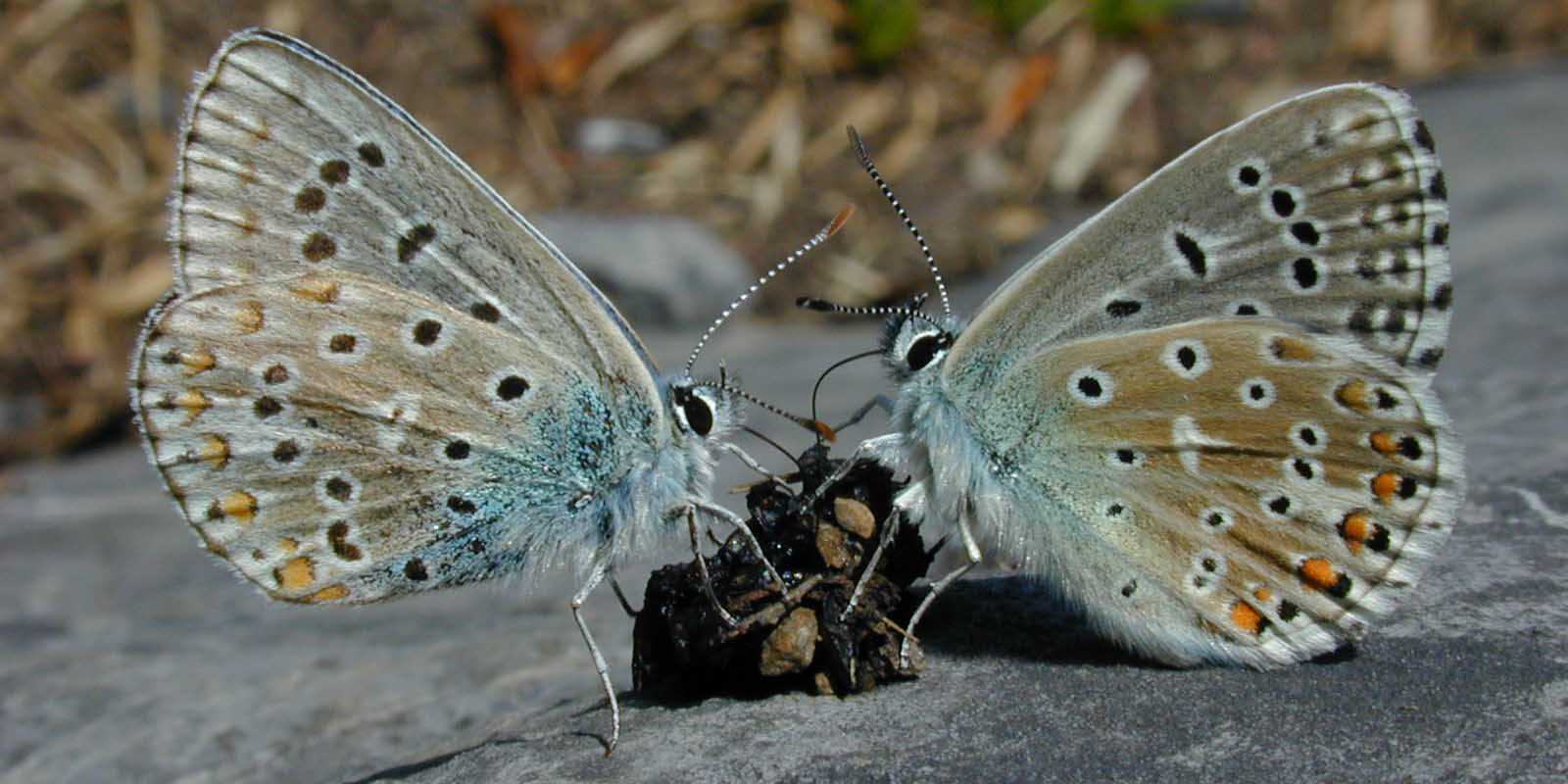
Two Adonis blue butterflies feeding on a lump of feces

Coprophagous insects consume and redigest the feces of large animals. These feces contain substantial amounts of semidigested food, particularly in the case of herbivores, owing to the inefficiency of the large animals' digestive systems. Thousands of species of coprophagous insects are known, especially among the orders Diptera and Coleoptera. Examples of such flies are Scathophaga stercoraria and Sepsis cynipsea, dung flies commonly found in Europe around cattle droppings.

Among beetles, dung beetles are a diverse lineage, many of which feed on the microorganism-rich liquid component of mammals' dung, and lay their eggs in balls composed mainly of the remaining fibrous material. Group living and aggregation among common earwigs promotes allo-coprophagy (consuming the feces of other members of one's own species) to promote the growth of helpful gut bacteria and provide a food source when food is scarce.

Through proctodeal feeding, termites eat one another's feces as a means of obtaining their hindgut protists. Termites and protists have a symbiotic relationship (e.g. with the protozoan that allows the termites to digest the cellulose in their diet). For example, in one group of termites, a three-way symbiotic relationship exists; termites of the family Rhinotermitidae, cellulolytic protists of the genus Pseudotrichonympha in the guts of these termites, and intracellular bacterial symbionts of the protists.

Among crustaceans, juvenile Gammarus pulex have been known to feed on adult feces until they have matured enough to eat conditioned leaves.

=== By vertebrates ===
Lagomorphs (rabbits, hares, pikas) and some other mammals ferment fiber in their cecums, which is then expelled as cecotropes and eaten from the anus, a process called "cecotrophy". Then their food is processed through the gastrointestinal tract a second time, which allows them to absorb more nutrition. While cecotropes are expelled from the anus, they are not feces, and thus eating them is not called coprophagia.

Domesticated and wild mammals are sometimes coprophagic. Some dogs may lack critical digestive enzymes when they are only eating processed dried foods, so they gain these from consuming fecal matter. They only consume fecal matter that is less than two days old, which supports this theory.

Cattle in the United States are often fed chicken litter. Concerns have arisen that the practice of feeding chicken litter to cattle could lead to bovine spongiform encephalopathy (mad-cow disease) because of the crushed bone meal in chicken feed. The U.S. Food and Drug Administration regulates this practice by attempting to prevent the introduction of any part of cattle brain or spinal cord into livestock feed. Chickens also eat their own feces. Other countries, such as Canada, have banned chicken litter for use as a livestock feed.

The young of elephants, giant pandas, koalas, and hippos eat the feces of their mothers or other animals in the herd, to obtain the bacteria required to properly digest vegetation found in their ecosystems. When such animals are born, their intestines are sterile and do not contain these bacteria. Without doing this, they would be unable to obtain any nutritional value from plants. Piglets with access to maternal feces early in life exhibited better performance.

Hamsters, guinea pigs, chinchillas, hedgehogs, and pigs eat their own droppings, which are thought to be a source of vitamins B and K, produced by gut bacteria. Sometimes, there is also the aspect of self-anointment while these creatures eat their droppings. On rare occasions gorillas have been observed consuming their feces, possibly out of boredom, a desire for warm food, or to reingest seeds contained in the feces.

== Coprophagia by humans ==
In humans, coprophagia has been described since the late 19th century in individuals with mental illnesses and in some sexual acts, such as the practices of anilingus and felching where sex partners insert their tongue into each other's anus and ingest biologically significant amounts of feces. Coprophagia is also done sexually, by coprophiles.

=== In cuisine ===
Animal feces-made food include but are not limited to Kopi luwak, insect tea, and Black Ivory Coffee. Casu martzu is a cheese that uses the digestive processes of live maggots to help ferment and break down the cheese's fats.

=== As a cult practice ===
Members of an unnamed religious cult in Thailand routinely ate the feces and dead skin of their leader, whom they considered to be a holy man with healing powers.

=== As a paraphilia ===
According to the DSM-5, coprophilia is a paraphilia where the object of sexual interest is feces. This can involve coprophagia. Coprophagia is sometimes depicted in pornography, typically under the term "scat" (from scatology), such as in the shock video 2 Girls 1 Cup. The 120 Days of Sodom, a 1785 novel by the Marquis de Sade, prominently features depictions of erotic sadomasochistic coprophagia. The 1975 film of the same name also contains scenes of coprophilia and coprophagia.

=== As a supposed medical treatment ===
Ayurveda and Siddha medicine use animal excreta in various forms, with the most important being the dung and urine of the zebu.

During the mid 16th century, physicians tasted their patients' feces to better judge their state and condition, according to François Rabelais. Rabelais studied medicine, but was also a writer of satirical and grotesque fiction, so the truth of this statement is unclear.

Elephant caretakers in Xayaboury province, Laos, have been documented using elephant feces primarily as a medicine for gastrointestinal and skin problems.

=== As a symptom ===
Coprophagia has also been observed in some people with schizophrenia and pica.

== See also ==
- Coprophilous fungi
- Faecal transplant
- Fecal bacteriotherapy
- Fecal–oral route, a route of disease transmission
- Panchagavya
- Pig toilet
- Scathophagidae
- Scatophagidae
- Urophagia, the consumption of urine
