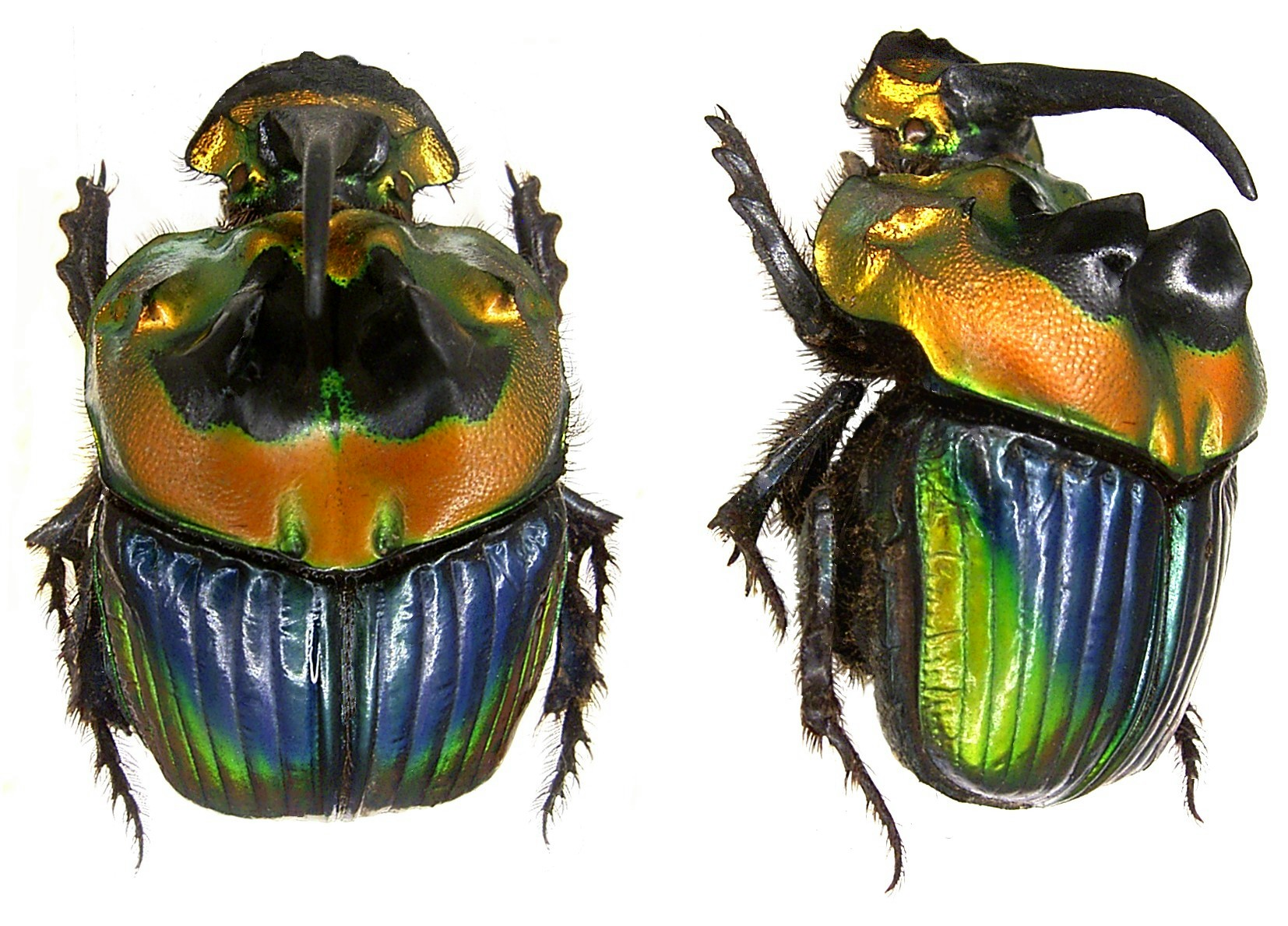
- Male Sulcophanaeus i. imperator

Scientific classification
- Kingdom: Animalia
- Phylum: Arthropoda
- Class: Insecta
- Order: Coleoptera
- Suborder: Polyphaga
- Infraorder: Scarabaeiformia
- Family: Scarabaeidae
- Genus: Sulcophanaeus
- Species: S. imperator

Binomial name
- Sulcophanaeus imperator (Chevrolat, 1844)

Synonyms
- Phanaeus dimidiatus Solier, 1851; Phanaeus imperator Chevrolat, 1844

= Sulcophanaeus imperator =

Species of beetle

Sulcophanaeus imperator is a brightly colored species of dung beetle belonging to the family Scarabaeidae. This diurnal, coprophagous beetle is native to south-central South America and generally common. It is paracoprid, meaning that adults dig tunnels into the soil under the food source and move parts of the food source to a nest chamber where the eggs are laid.

== Distribution and habitat ==
This species can be found in central to northwestern Argentina, central and southern Bolivia and western Paraguay in dry and thorny forests, pastures and scrublands at an elevation of 320–3,000 m (1,050–9,850 ft) above sea level.

== Subspecies ==
There are three subspecies, which alternatively have been considered as color phases.

- Sulcophanaeus imperator imperator (Chevrolat, 1844) ("golden phase") – widespread in central and northern Argentina, Paraguay
- Sulcophanaeus imperator alticollis Arnaud, 2002 ("red phase") – highlands of Bolivia, northern Argentina
- Sulcophanaeus imperator obscurus Arnaud, 2002 ("green phase") – only known from La Rioja, Argentina

== Description ==
Adults of Sulcophanaeus imperator are 18–28 mm (0.7–1.1 in) long. Males have a dark, long and curved horn on the forehead, whereas females at most have a small indication of a horn.

There are three distinct subspecies (or color phases) that are similar, except for their color. All three have a black center of the head and a large black spot on the central pronotum, while the central and frontal parts of the elytra are shiny blue, shiny green or black. In S. i. imperator ("golden phase") the outer parts of the head and outer and rear parts of the pronotum are gold to coppery, often with some shiny green, and the rear part and outer edges of the elytra are gold, coppery or shiny green. In S. i. alticollis ("red phase") the outer parts of the head, outer and rear parts of the pronotum, and the rear part and outer edges of the elytra are shiny coppery red to brick red. In S. i. obscurus ("green phase") the outer parts of the head, outer and rear parts of the pronotum, and rear part and outer edges the elytra are shiny green.

== Gallery ==
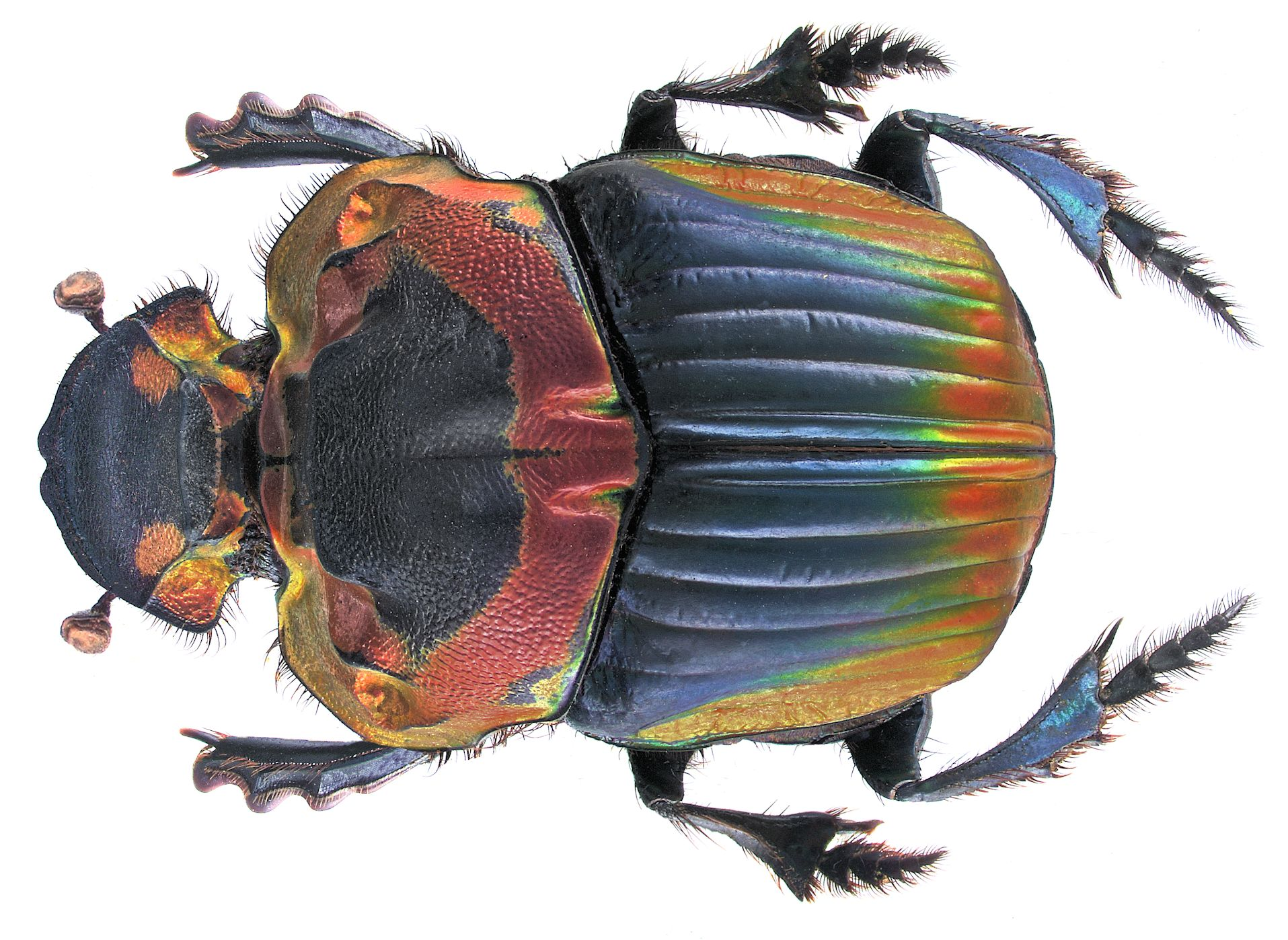
Female of Sulcophanaeus i. alticollis

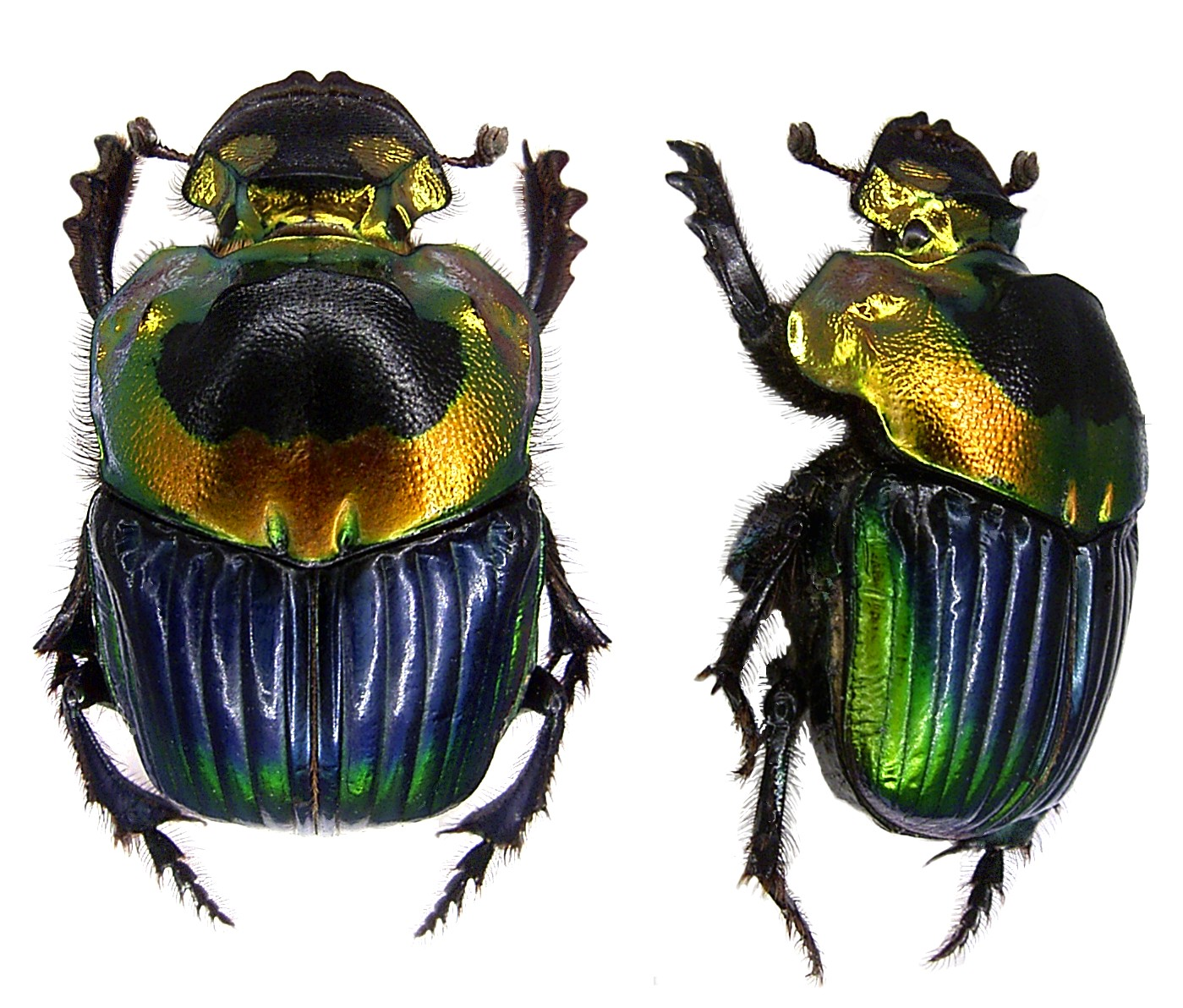
Female of Sulcophanaeus i. imperator
