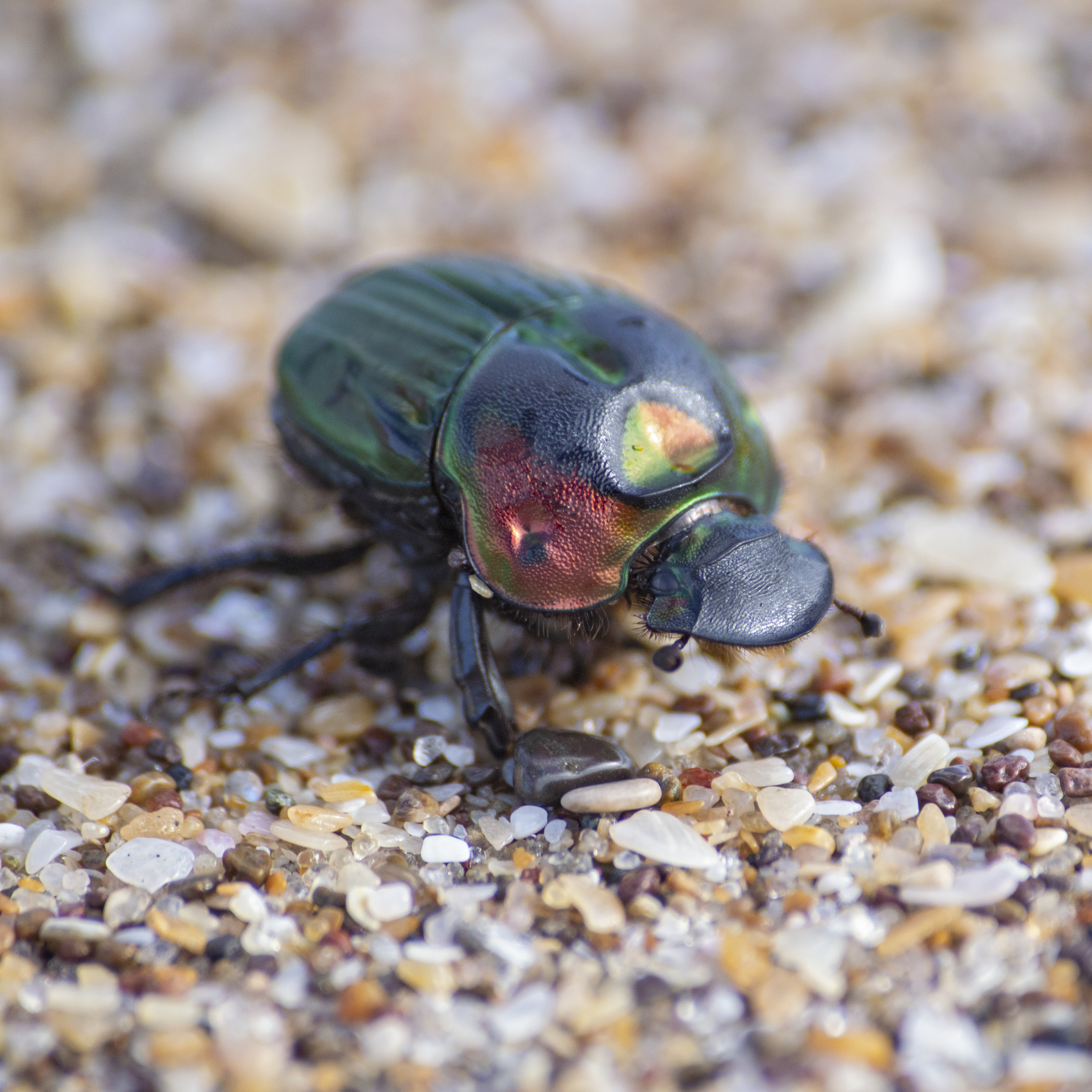
- Sulcophanaeus menelas (female)

Scientific classification
- Kingdom: Animalia
- Phylum: Arthropoda
- Class: Insecta
- Order: Coleoptera
- Suborder: Polyphaga
- Infraorder: Scarabaeiformia
- Family: Scarabaeidae
- Tribe: Phanaeini
- Genus: Sulcophanaeus; Olsoufieff, 1924

= Sulcophanaeus =

Genus of beetles

Sulcophanaeus is a genus of dung beetles belonging to the family Scarabaeidae. Most species in this genus are from tropical and subtropical South America, but a few are found in Central America and Mexico, and S. carnifex is from Jamaica (no other Phanaeini is found on an oceanic island). Sulcophanaeus are mostly coprophagous, but some are also necrophagous. They are paracoprids, meaning that adults dig tunnels into the soil under the food source and move parts of the food source to a nest chamber where the eggs are laid, and their activity pattern (diurnal / crepuscular / nocturnal; year-round / seasonal) varies depending on species.

== Species ==
Sulcophanaeus comprises five species groups (faunus, carnifex, auricollis, imperator and menelas) and about 15 valid species:

- Sulcophanaeus actaeon (Erichson, 1847)
- Sulcophanaeus auricollis (von Harold, 1880)
- Sulcophanaeus batesi (von Harold, 1868)
- Sulcophanaeus carnifex (Linnaeus, 1758)
- Sulcophanaeus chryseicollis (von Harold, 1863)
- Sulcophanaeus columbi (W.S. MacLeay, 1819)
- Sulcophanaeus faunus (Fabricius, 1775)
- Sulcophanaeus imperator (Chevrolat, 1844)
- Sulcophanaeus leander (Waterhouse, 1891)
- Sulcophanaeus menelas (Laporte de Castelnau, 1840)
- Sulcophanaeus miyashitai Arnaud, 2002
- Sulcophanaeus noctis (Bates, 1887)
- Sulcophanaeus rhadamanthus (von Harold, 1875)
- Sulcophanaeus steinheili (von Harold, 1875)
- Sulcophanaeus velutinus (Murray, 1856)

== Description ==
Adult Sulcophanaeus are generally 1–3 cm (0.4–1.2 in) long with some variations in exact size range depending on species, but the common Amazonian S. faunus usually is 3–4 cm (1.2–1.6 in) and sometimes even larger. They are short and powerful dung beetles. This genus includes some particularly colorful species with shiny, metallic colors, but there are also Sulcophanaeus species that are all black or very dark brown. Especially the males tend to have a long curved horn on the top of the head and may also have outgrowths of various kinds on the pronotum. The pronotum is much broader than long. The elytra are short and broad with deep longitudinal wrinkles.

== Gallery ==
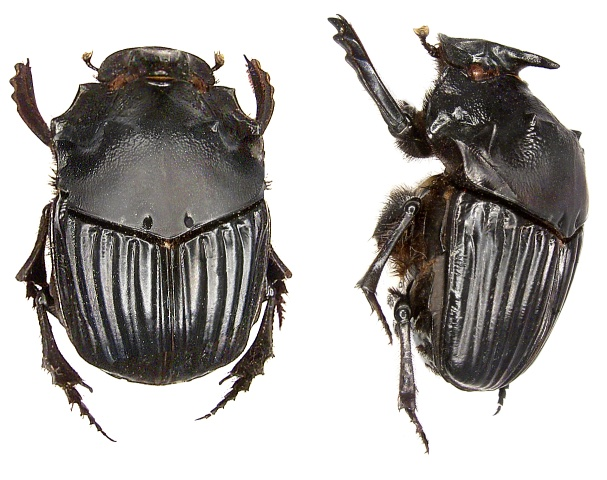
Sulcophanaeus faunus - female

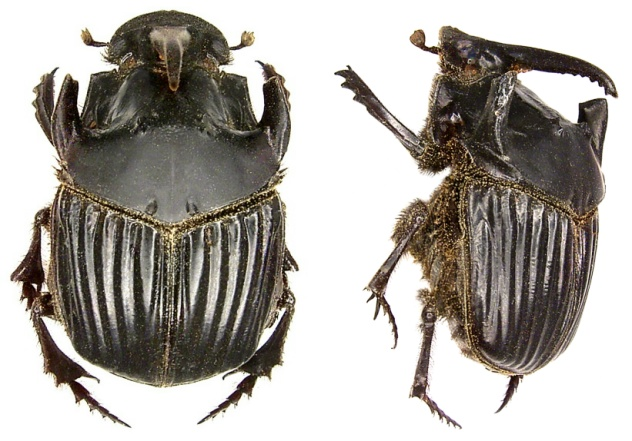
Sulcophanaeus faunus - male

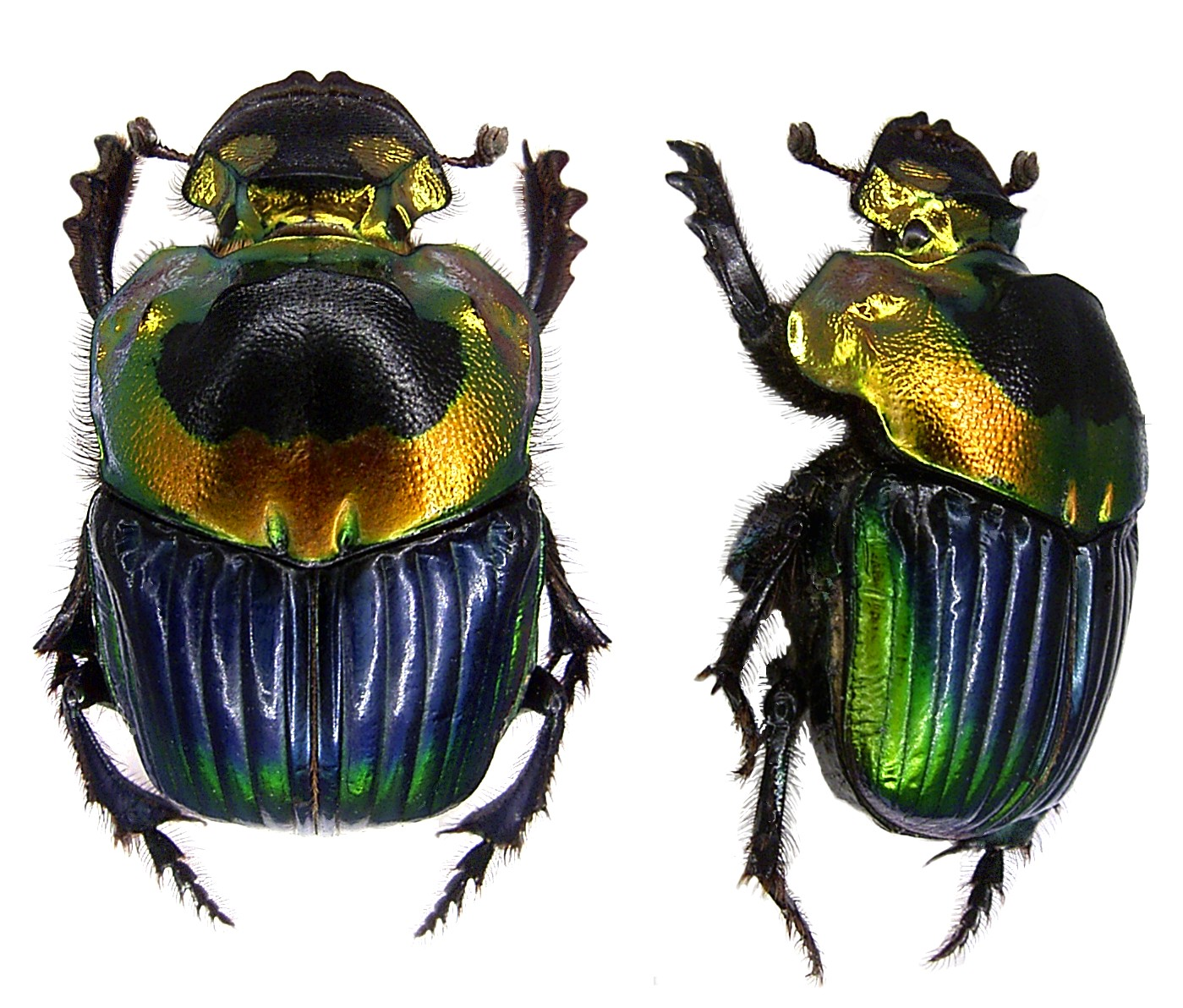
Sulcophanaeus imperator imperator - female

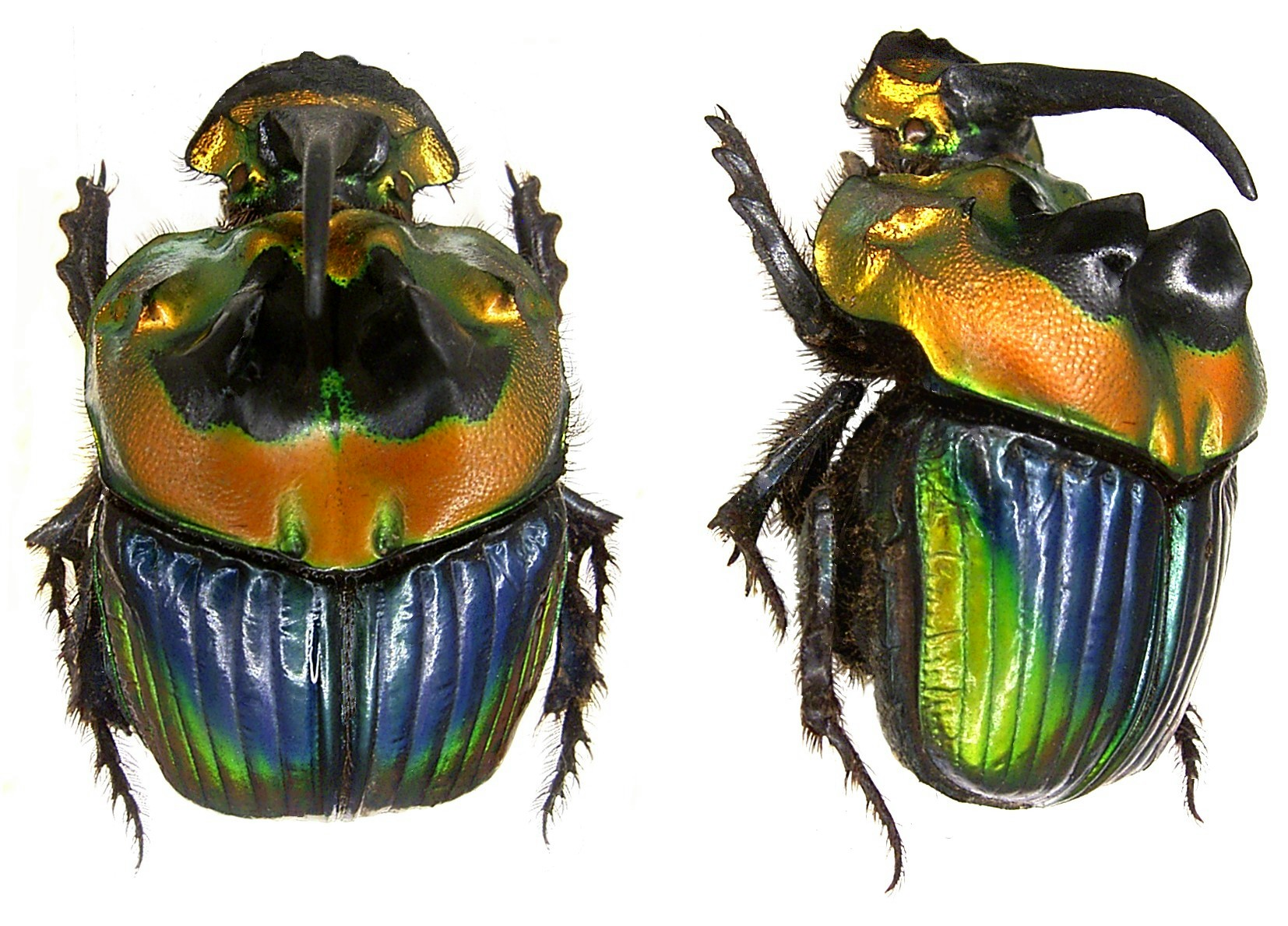
Sulcophanaeus imperator imperator - male

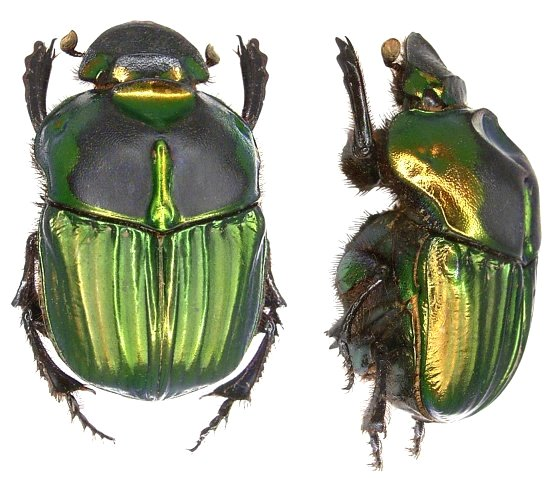
Sulcophanaeus menelas - female

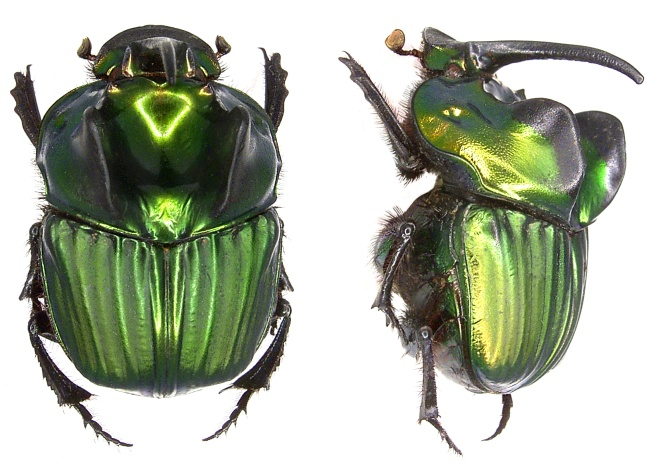
Sulcophanaeus menelas - male
