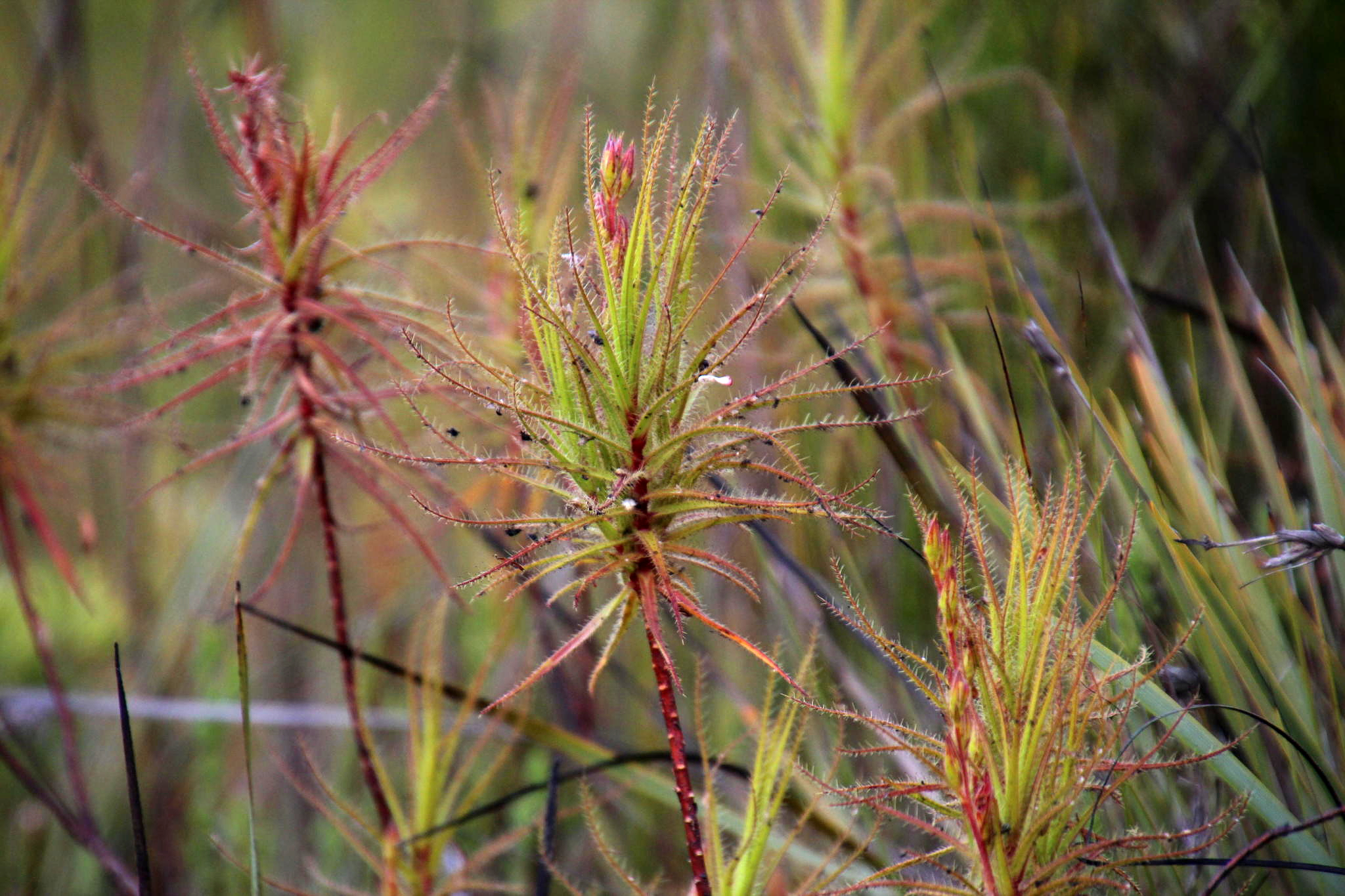
- photo: Tony Rebelo

Scientific classification
- Kingdom: Plantae
- Clade: Tracheophytes
- Clade: Angiosperms
- Clade: Eudicots
- Clade: Asterids
- Order: Ericales
- Family: Roridulaceae
- Genus: Roridula
- Species: R. gorgonias

Binomial name
- Roridula gorgonias Planch. (1848)

Synonyms
- Roridula brachysepala Gdgr. (1913) [=R. dentata/R. gorgonias]; Roridula crinita Gdgr. (1913)

= Roridula gorgonias =

Evergreen shrub

Roridula gorgonias is an evergreen, branching, upright shrub of up to about 1 m (3 ft) high, from the family Roridulaceae. It has awl-shaped leaves with entire margins, crowded at the tip of the branches. These are set with tentacles that secrete a sticky, shiny resin from the thicker gland at their tips, that catch many airborne items. At the center of the shoots appear inflorescences between July and October that consist of up to twelve flowers in spikes, each on a short flower stalk, with a bract at its base. The 5-merous flower is about 2½ cm (1 in) in diameter and has pinkish purple or white petals. The plants do not digest the trapped insects, but the bug Pameridea roridulae sucks out their juices and the plant absorbs nutrients from the bug's droppings. It is therefore considered a protocarnivorous plant. It is called Gorgons dewstick, fly bush or fly catcher bush in English and vliebos, or vlieëbossie in Afrikaans. (but these names are also used for its relative R. dentata). R. gorgonias is an endemic species home to the southwest of the Western Cape province of South Africa.

== Description ==
Gorgons dewstick is a slender shrub growing up to 60–100 cm high. It has fairly stout brownish stems, that show conspicuous horizontal leaf scars. The leaves are crowded at the tip of the branches, the youngest upright, but the leaf base steadily bending down until eventually fully reflexed. When a shoot has flowered, it dies off, but produces side shoots below the old inflorescences. The leaves are set alternately and lack both stipules and leaf stalk. The leaf blade is line-shaped, up to 12 cm (6 in) long and ½ cm (0.2 in) wide, tapering towards the tip. It has an entire margin, that carries many with long tentacles topped by teardrop-shaped glands. The upper surface of the leaves is covered with much smaller, shorter tentacles intermingled with white hairs. The lower surface of the leaves is hairless but on the raised mid-vein is a row of short tentacles. The flowers are set in a spike with a terminal flower, and may consist of up to twelve star-symmertical flowers, each on a short flower stalk with a bract at its base.
