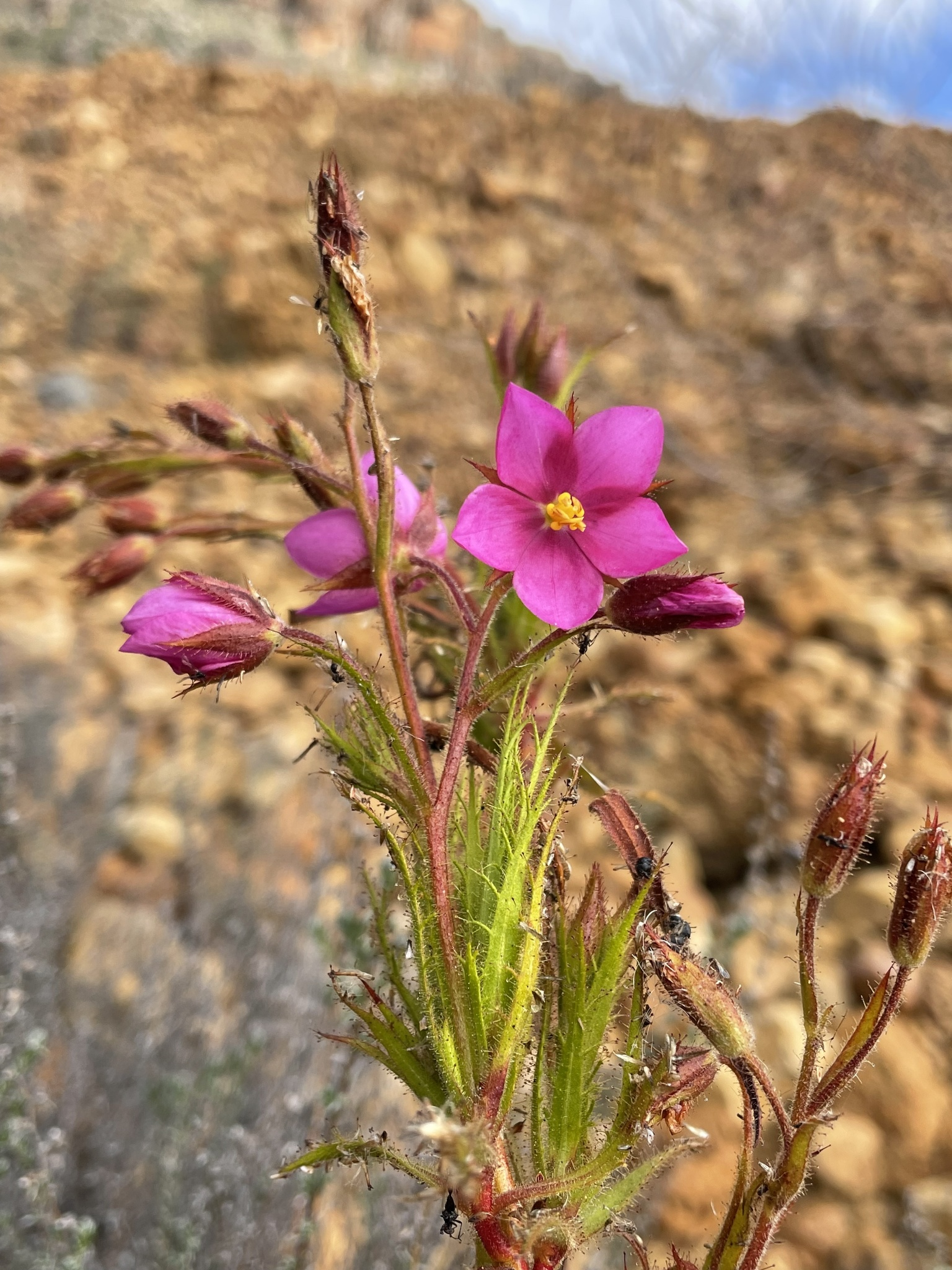

Conservation status
- Least Concern (SANBI Red List)

Scientific classification
- Kingdom: Plantae
- Clade: Tracheophytes
- Clade: Angiosperms
- Clade: Eudicots
- Clade: Asterids
- Order: Ericales
- Family: Roridulaceae
- Genus: Roridula
- Species: R. dentata

Binomial name
- Roridula dentata L. (1764)

Synonyms
- Drosera roridula Thunb. (1797) nom.illeg.; Drosera verticillata L. (1830) nom.illeg.; Ireon verticillatum (L.) Burm.f. (1768) nom.illeg.; Roridula brachysepala Gdgr. (1913) [=R. dentata/R. gorgonias]; Roridula muscicapa Gaertn. (1788); Roridula verticillata (L.) Pers. (1815) nom.illeg.

= Roridula dentata =

Species of carnivorous plant

Roridula dentata (also called the northern dewstick) is a protocarnivorous plant native to the Western Cape province of South Africa.

It can be found only in South Africa, in the hotter and more arid inland mountains of Clanwilliam, Tulbagh and Ceres, and can grow up to more than 150 cm. The leaves are covered with sticky hairs and produce a resin (rather than a mucilage as in most other sticky carnivorous plants), enabling it to catch insects, such as wasps or bees, and very occasionally small birds. It benefits indirectly from catching prey, as several species of Pameridea are unaffected by the stickiness of the leaves. R. dentata then absorbs the nitrogen from the droppings of the insects, resulting in an obligate mutualistic relationship. This relationship is effectively indirect carnivory, which some believe is enough to classify R. dentata as a proper carnivorous plant with flypaper-type traps.

== Gallery ==
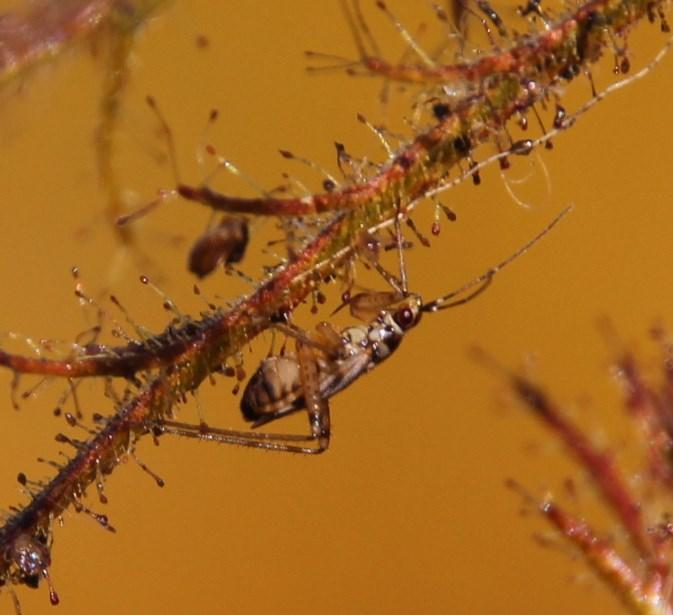
Cedarberg dewstick bug on the northern dewstick.

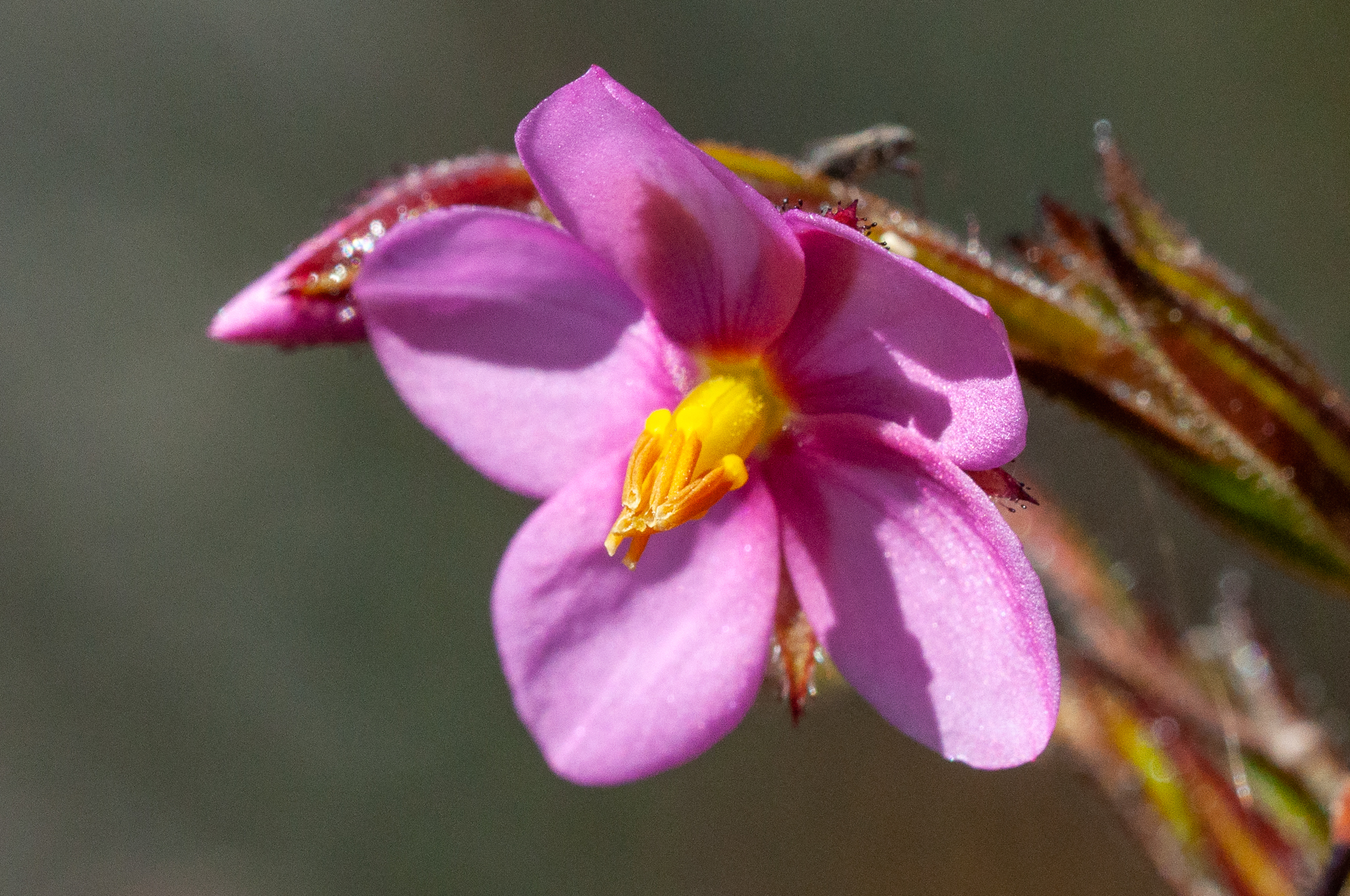
Close-up

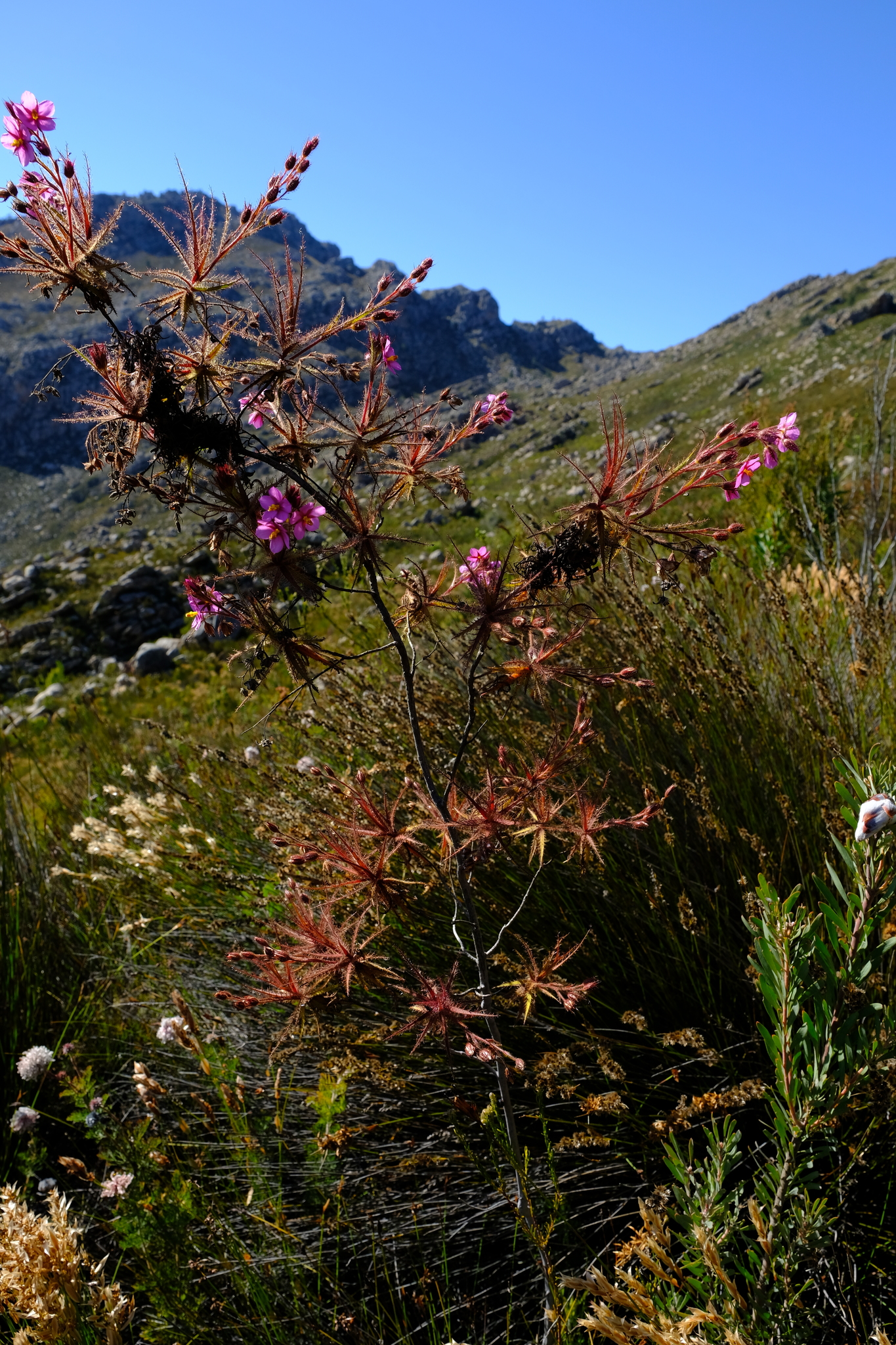

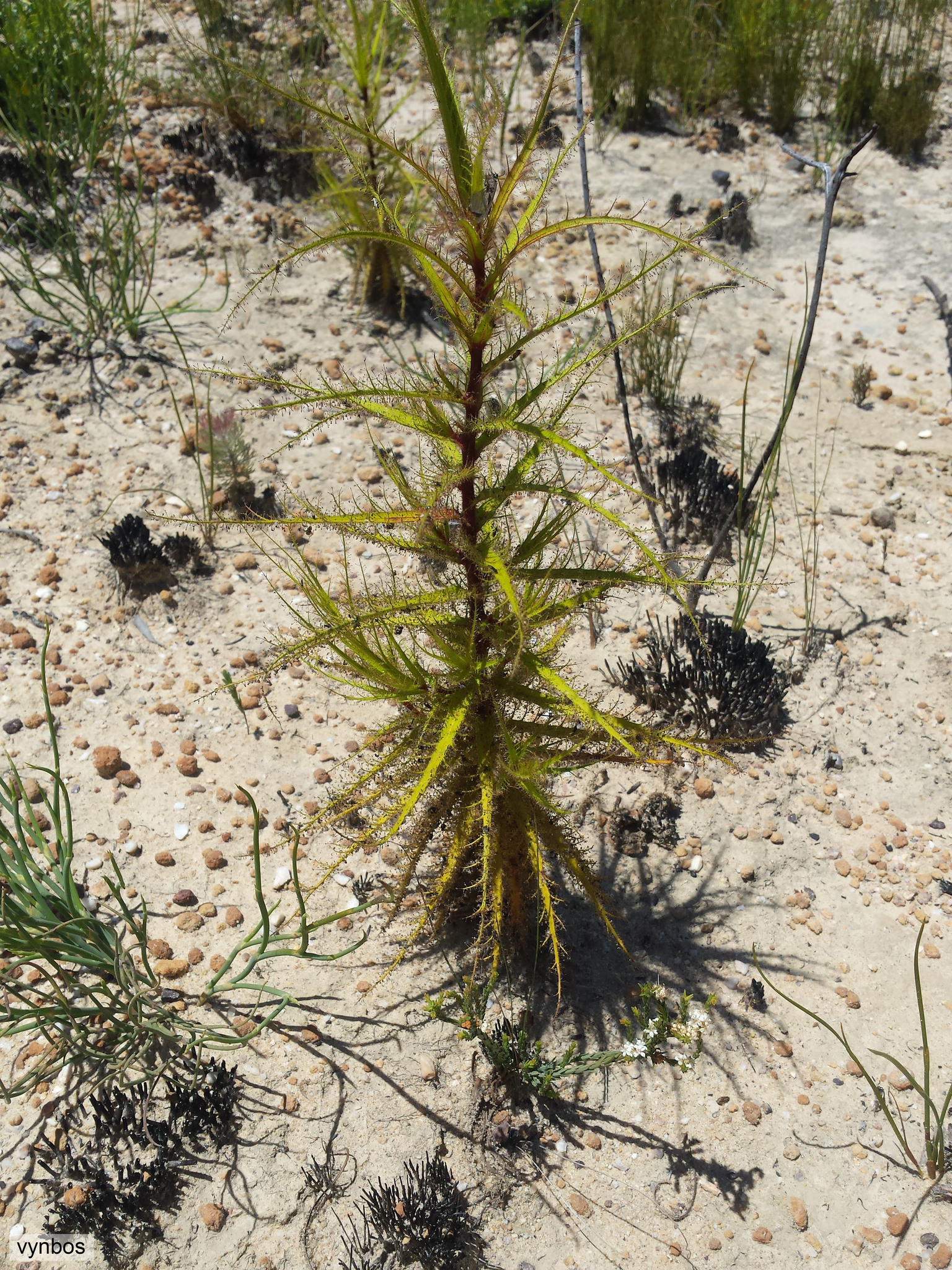
