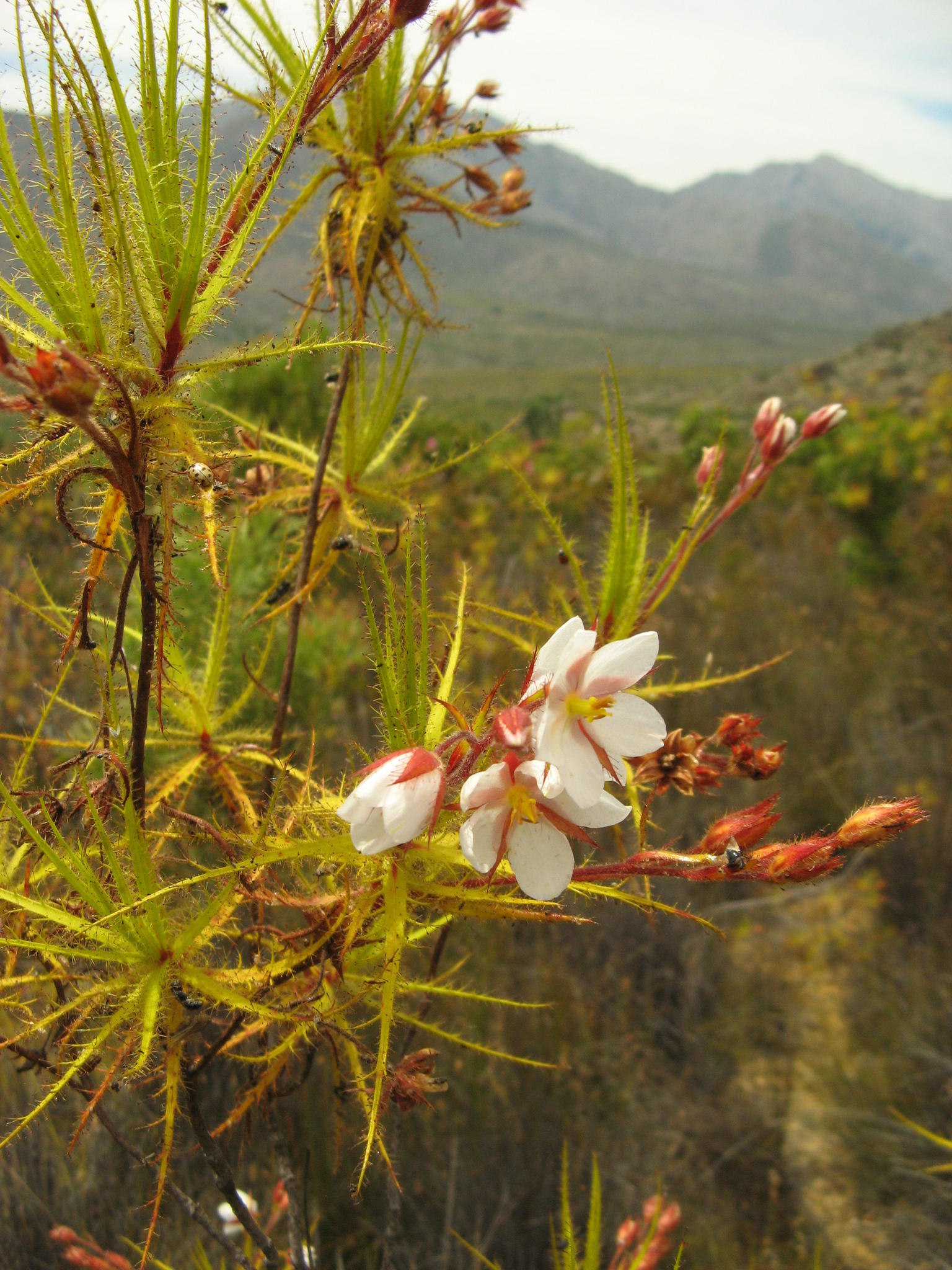
- Roridula dentata

Scientific classification
- Kingdom: Plantae
- Clade: Tracheophytes
- Clade: Angiosperms
- Clade: Eudicots
- Clade: Asterids
- Order: Ericales
- Family: Roridulaceae; Engl. & Gilg (1924) nom.cons.
- Genus: Roridula; L. (1764)

Species
- Roridula dentata; Roridula gorgonias
- Roridula distribution

= Roridula =

Insect-trapping shrublet from South Africa

Roridula (/rɒˈrɪdjʊlə/; from Latin roridus "dewy") is a genus of evergreen, insect-trapping shrubs, with two species, of about 1.3–2 m (4.3–6.6 ft). It is the only genus in the family Roridulaceae. It has thin, woody, shyly branching, upright, initially brown, later grey stems, with lance- to awl-shaped leaves crowded at their tips. The star-symmetrical flowers consist from the outside in of five, green or reddish, free sepals, alternating with five white, pink or purple, free petals. Further to the middle and opposite the sepals are five stamens with the anthers initially kinked down. These suddenly flip up if the nectar-containing swelling at its base is being touched. The center of the flower is occupied by a superior ovary. The leaves and sepals carry many sticky tentacles of different sizes, that trap insects. Roridula does not break down the insect proteins, but bugs of the genus Pameridea prey on the trapped insects. These later deposit their feces on the leaves, which take up nutrients from the droppings. The species can be found in the Western Cape province of South Africa. They are commonly known as dewstick or fly bush in English and vlieëbos or vlieëbossie in Afrikaans.

== Description ==
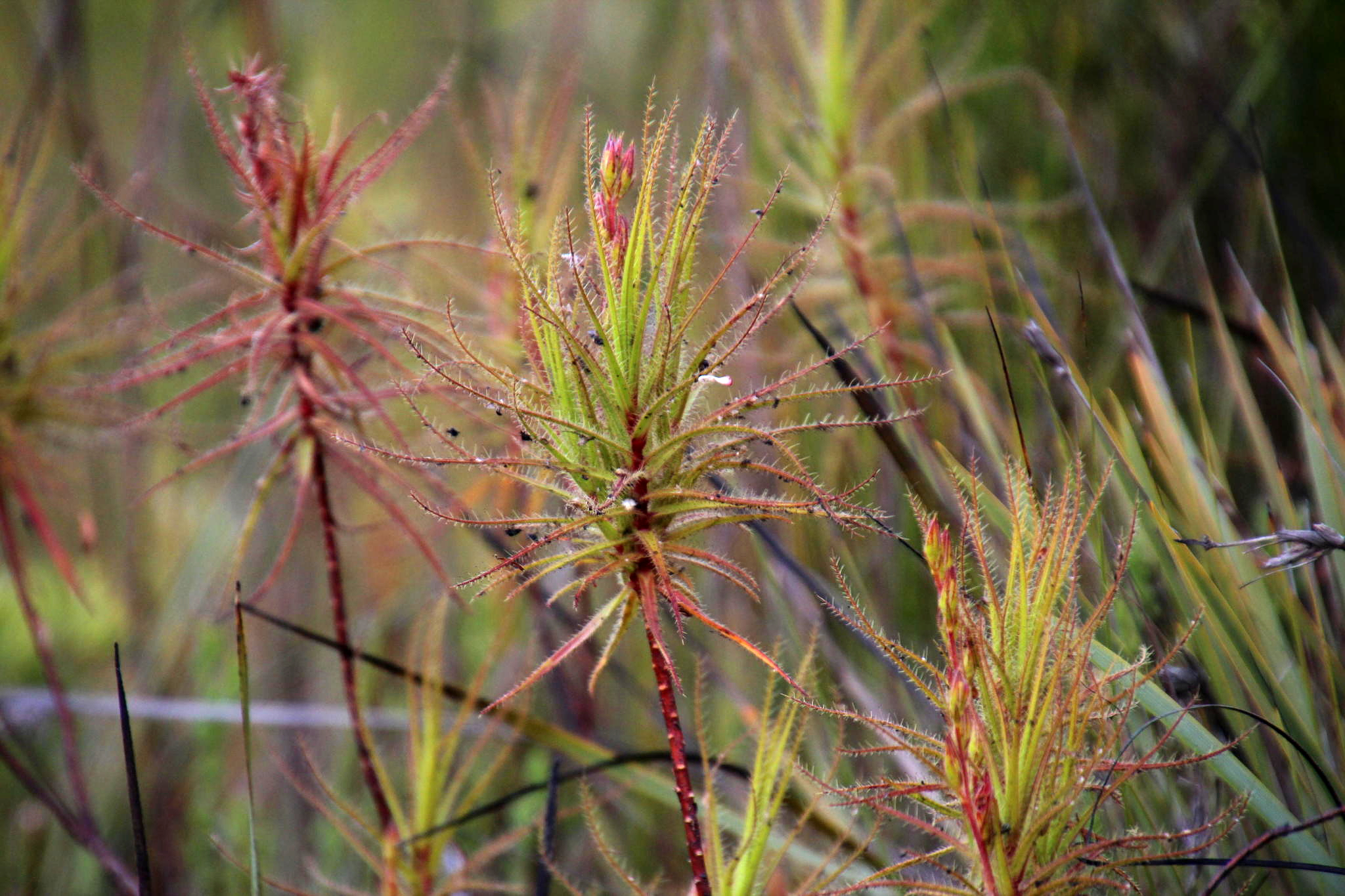
R. gorgonias can be distinguished by its entire leaves and spiky inflorescences

The two species in the genus Roridula are slender evergreen shrubs up to 1.3–2 m (4.3–6.6 ft) high. They grow from a taproot with few side roots. The perennial, upright, shyly branching stems are leafless, except near the top. The leaves are arranged alternately, crowded at the tip of the branches, almost as if in a rosette. The leaves are awl-shaped, lack both stipules and a leaf stalk, either with entire margins or with distanced line-shaped lobes. The leaves and calyx are set with different sizes stalked glands or tentacles that secrete a resin.

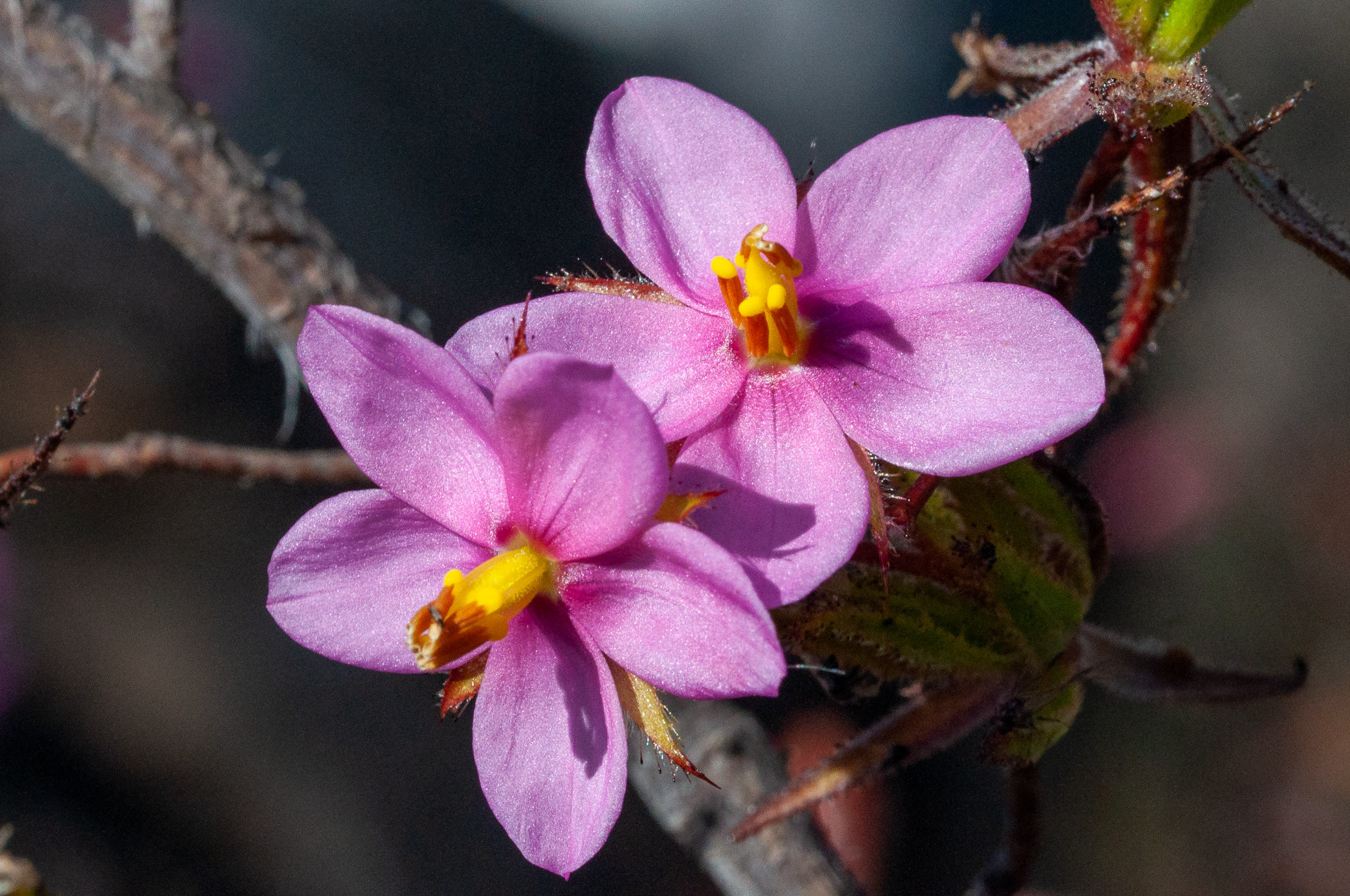
Two flowers of R. dentata, the one in the background showing three anthers still flipped down, the two in the back already turned up.

The 5-merous bisexual flowers are set with several in racemes amidst the crowded leaves at the tip of the branches. The free sepals and petals are well-developed and star-symmetrical. The broadly inverted egg-shaped petals are white, reddish pink or bright purple and are overlapping in a circle in the bud. Inside the petals are five stamens that sit opposite the sepals and below the ovary. The filaments are free, line-shaped, topped by anthers that are connected with the filament near their base. These anthers have two pollen-containing cavities that open inwards through four short slits near the top. The anthers are initially flipped downward on the outside. They are subtended by a swelling that contains a cavity that contains nectar. When the swelling is touched, the anther explosively swings up, releasing the pollen through the slits. The superior ovary in the center of the flower consists of three merged carpels, that together protect three cavities within which are one to four anatropous ovules each of which is covered by a single layer. The upright style tapers towards the top and carries a small globe-shaped stigma or expands towards the top into an inverted cone-shaped stigma, covered in small grains. The smooth, cartilaginous, dehiscent fruit opens with three valves. The small, dark reddish brown seeds are ellipsoid in shape either with a smoothed netted structure or angular with three sutures and with prominent warts or a honeycomb-like structure.

Both species are diploids having six sets of homologue chromosomes (2n=12).

=== Differences between the species ===
R. dentata can be distinguished by its larger habit of up to 2 m, the line-shaped lobes along its leaves and the umbel-like inflorescences, whereas R. gorgonias is smaller, up to 1.3 m (4.3 ft), has entire leaves and spike-like inflorescences.

== Taxonomy ==
Carl Linnaeus described Roridula in 1764. The name Roridula derives from roridus, a Latin word meaning "dewy", which refers to the fine drops of liquid on the tentacles that give the leaves a dewy appearance.

Over time, different botanists have held different views on the affinities of the genus Roridula. Jules Émile Planchon thought it should be assigned to the Ochnaceae in 1848. George Bentham and Joseph Dalton Hooker, two of the nineteenth century's most influential British botanists however, included it in 1867 in the Droseraceae. In 1912, Johannes Gottfried Hallier regarded Roridula as a specialized member of the Clethraceae. Hutchinson in 1959, and Arthur Cronquist in 1981 included it in the Byblidaceae. Current insights in the relationships of the Roridulaceae, based on a 2015 DNA-analysis, are summarized in the following tree.

- core Ericales
  - Sarracenoid clade
    - - family Sarraceniaceae
        - Darlingtonia
        - - Heliamphora
          - Sarracenia
    - - family Actinidiaceae
        - Saurauia
        - - Clematoclethra
          - Actinidia
      - family Roridulaceae
        - R. dentata
        - R. gorgonias
  - Ericoid clade
    - - family Ericaceae
      - family Cyrillaceae
    - family Clethraceae

== Distribution, habitat and ecology ==
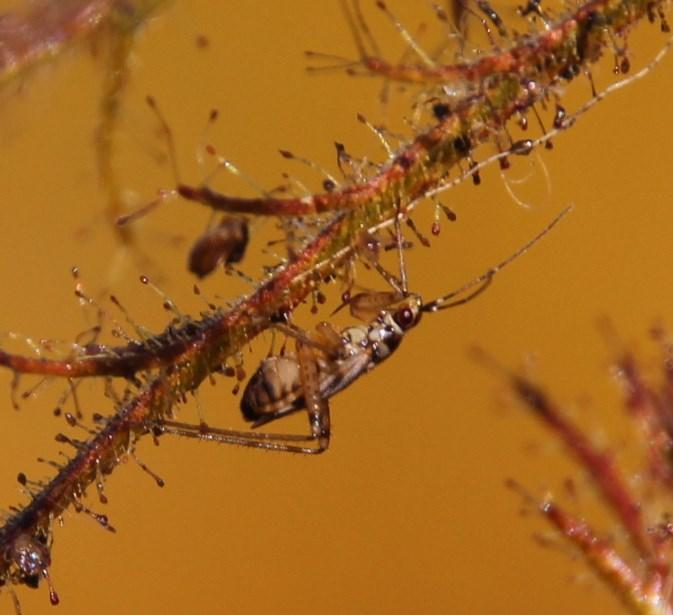
Pameridea marlothi on Roridula dentata

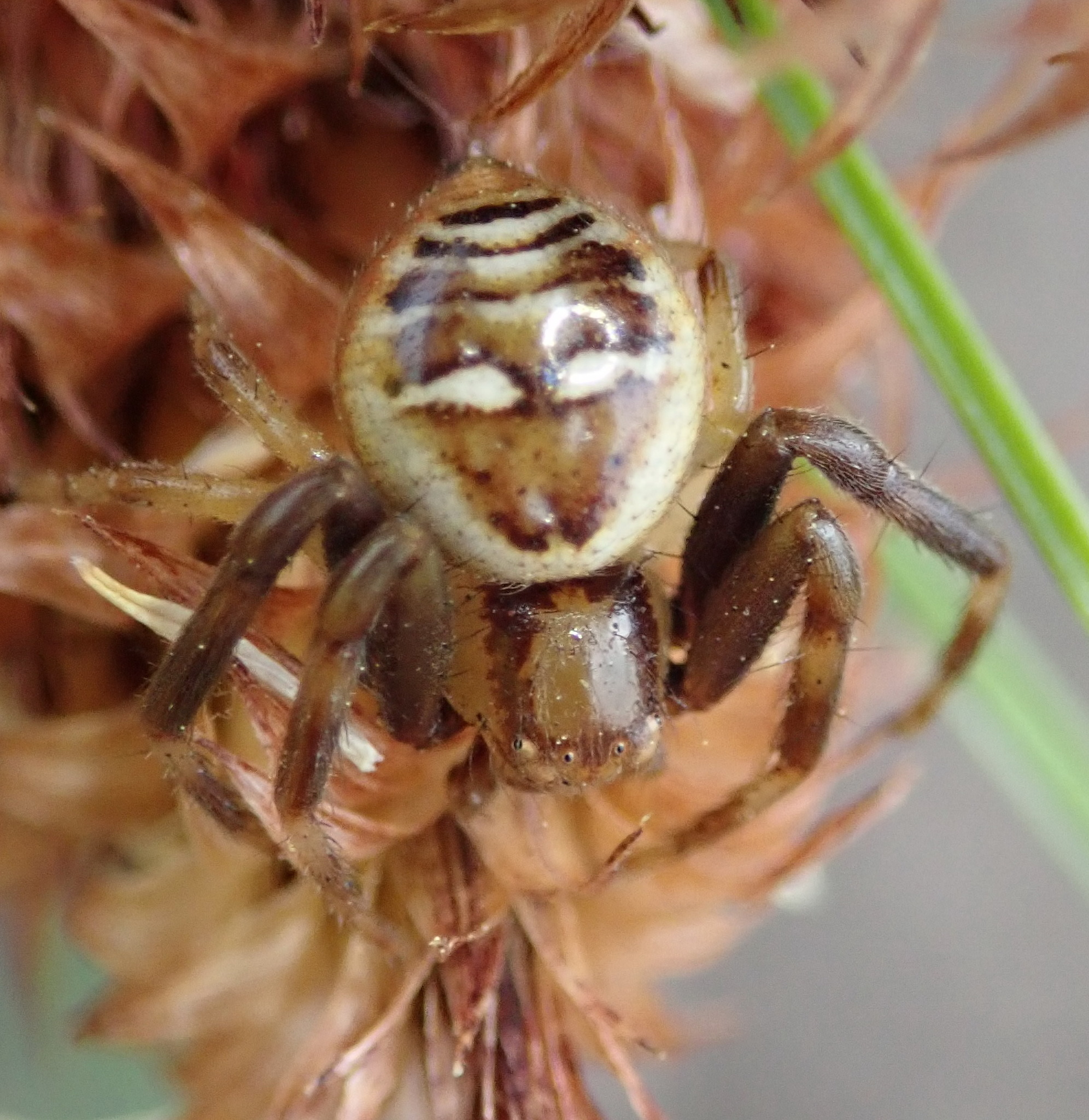
Synema marlothi

The genus Roridula is endemic to parts of the mountains in the west and southwest of the Western Cape province of South Africa. R. dentata can be found in the mountains of Tulbagh, Clanwilliam and Ceres. R. gorgonias occurs between Somerset West and Swellendam. Both species grow on acidic and nutrient-poor, sandy soils, in locations that are relatively moist, at altitudes of 900–1,200 m (3,000–3,900 ft) for R. dentata and 150–925 m (500–3,000 ft) for R. gorgonias.

The seeds of Roridula dentata germinate shortly after a fire has destroyed the vegetation. Flowering mostly occurs in September and December.

Like many other carnivorous plants, Roridula has a rather poorly developed root system, and grows on acidic and leached soils in humid locations. Roridula shares its habitat with several Drosera species. Like Drosera, R. gorgonias strongly absorbs UV and this is assumed to attract flying insects. Both Drosera and Roridula trap large numbers of various flying insects. Unlike Drosera, Roridula gorgonias secretes a very sticky resinous substance, mainly containing acylglycerides and triterpenoids that are insoluble in water. This implies that insects can even be trapped during rainy weather.

Roridula does not respond by bending tentacles to struggling insects, unlike Drosera, that secrete a sticky mixture of saccharides or proteins. Instead, it carries three types of glandular hairs that differ in size: long, medium, and short. The long tentacles are less sticky, and by struggling, the insect comes in contact with the much more sticky medium and short glands, which completely immobilize it.

Carnivorous plants like Drosera secrete enzymes that break down proteins (so-called proteases) from the captured insects, and so make available nitrates to these plants, that grow in soils with low ammonium and nitrate content. R. gorgonias however lacks proteases and is thus unable to extract these nutrients from trapped prey directly. Instead, each plant houses individuals of the bug Pameridea roridulae, which quickly close in on the trapped insects and feed on them. The bugs consequently defecate on the leaves. In a nitrogen-15 tracing experiment, where prey insects enriched with the rare heavy nitrogen isotope were eaten by Pameridea bugs, the share of N^{15} increased, showing that the plant had taken up nitrogen nutrients from the captured insects.

Pameridea was shown to have a thick greasy layer that prevents direct contact between the resin on Roridula tentacles and the insect's cuticle, this allows them to roam freely across the plants.

R. dentata also has a hemipteran resident, Pameridea marlothi, and may receive nitrogen nutrients in much the same way. In addition, several crab spider species of the genus Synema can be found on the plant and these may both prey on the captive insects as well as on the resident bugs. The unrelated Australian genus Byblis resembles Roridula in having sticky tentacles, and lives together with hemipteran bugs in much the same way. Unlike Roridula, Byblis also produces its own digestive enzymes, but this was not proven until 2005.

Pameridea is assigned to the Miridae, a family of bugs that further live from sucking plant juices. Although Pameridea depends on insects with their high protein content that have been captured by Roridula for completing its life cycle, it can survive on plant juices. In case of a fire, the bugs probably evacuate their home plant and fly off. Even if they do not find another Roridula specimen, the bugs can sit out the period until Roridula plants have germinated and sufficiently grown, by sucking juices of other plant species.

== Fossil record ==
Fragments of fossil leaves, morphologically very close to extant Roridula, have been found in two pieces of amber of Eocene age (35–47 million years old), from the Yantarny mine near Kaliningrad. These leaf tips are set with both non-glandular hairs and stalked glands (or tentacles), and have a linear-triangular shape that narrows to a terminal stalked gland. The hairs are on both surfaces and the margins, consist of a single cell, taper to a point, and are 10 to 80 μm long. The stalked glands are restricted to the margins and lower surface. The glands consist of many cells, forming a tapering stalk and a thick, hoof-shaped or egg-shaped head, with a small pore at its very tip. The stalks are 20–350 μm long (one stalk reaching 1.4 mm), the heads 20–120 μm long and 10–40 μm wide. Organic remains and hairs of other plant species are positioned on the heads, suggesting these were sticking to a secretion from the heads. The surface of the leaf consists of small six-sided cells at the base of the leaf and long, larger cells from the center to the tip of the leaf. These epidermal cells are 3–54 μm long and 6–18 μm wide. Stomata of 20–38 μm long and 15–25 μm wide are restricted to the underside of the leaf. Leaf shape, size and shape of the stomata and epidermal cells, the presence of non-glandular hairs, and of stalked glands that strongly differ in size on the lower leaf surface and on the margins including a terminal tentacle, as well as the head of the tentacle having an apical pore, are all characters shared with extant Roridula species. These fossils differ from today's dewsticks in having smaller tentacles, and in lacking a prominent midrib on the underside of the leaf.

The pieces of amber with the roridulid remains were found in a deposit formed in a forested swamp on a nutrient-poor and carbonate-free soil in a coastal area, with both angiosperm and conifer trees in a warm-temperate or subtropical climate. The presence of roridulids in the Northern Hemisphere during the Eocene questions the assumption that the family originated in Gondwana, about 90 million years ago.

== Use ==
Early settlers in parts of the Cape used to hang Roridula branches from the ceiling to catch flies.
