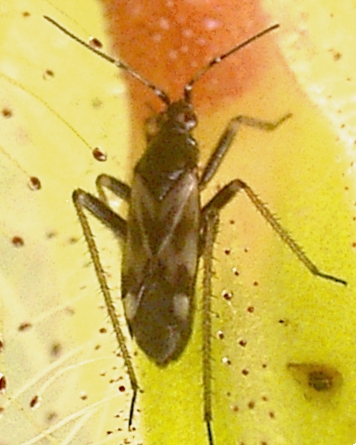
- Pameridea roridulae

Scientific classification
- Kingdom: Animalia
- Phylum: Arthropoda
- Class: Insecta
- Order: Hemiptera
- Suborder: Heteroptera
- Family: Miridae
- Subfamily: Bryocorinae
- Tribe: Dicyphini
- Genus: Pameridea; Reuter, 1907

Species
- Pameridea marlothi Pameridea roridulae

= Pameridea =

Genus of true bugs

Pameridea is a genus of insects comprising two species, P. roridulae and P. marlothii, that live in symbiotic relationships with carnivorous plants in the genus Roridula. Pameridea marlothii only occurs on R. dentata, while P. roridulae exists on both R. dentata and R. gorgonias.

== Life cycle ==
Pameridea roridulae can only live on Roridula, where it feeds on insects that the plant captures with its resin-tipped trichomes. After devouring the captured arthropods, bugs in the genus excrete waste, which the plant absorbs using glands, making it an example of symbiosis. Pameridea also mates while on the plant, and hatchlings continue to live on the Roridula plant.

== Conservation status ==
Since it is symbiotic with Roridula, its conservation status depends on the status of the plant. The Roridula plant is scarce in the wild, due to collecting, pollution, and habitat destruction, although it is secure in cultivation from avid carnivorous plant enthusiasts.

== Characteristics ==
Pameridea roridulae and P. marlothii both have wings; however they are not very good fliers. They are small bugs, usually not reaching more than a few millimetres in size.

== Relationship with Roridula ==
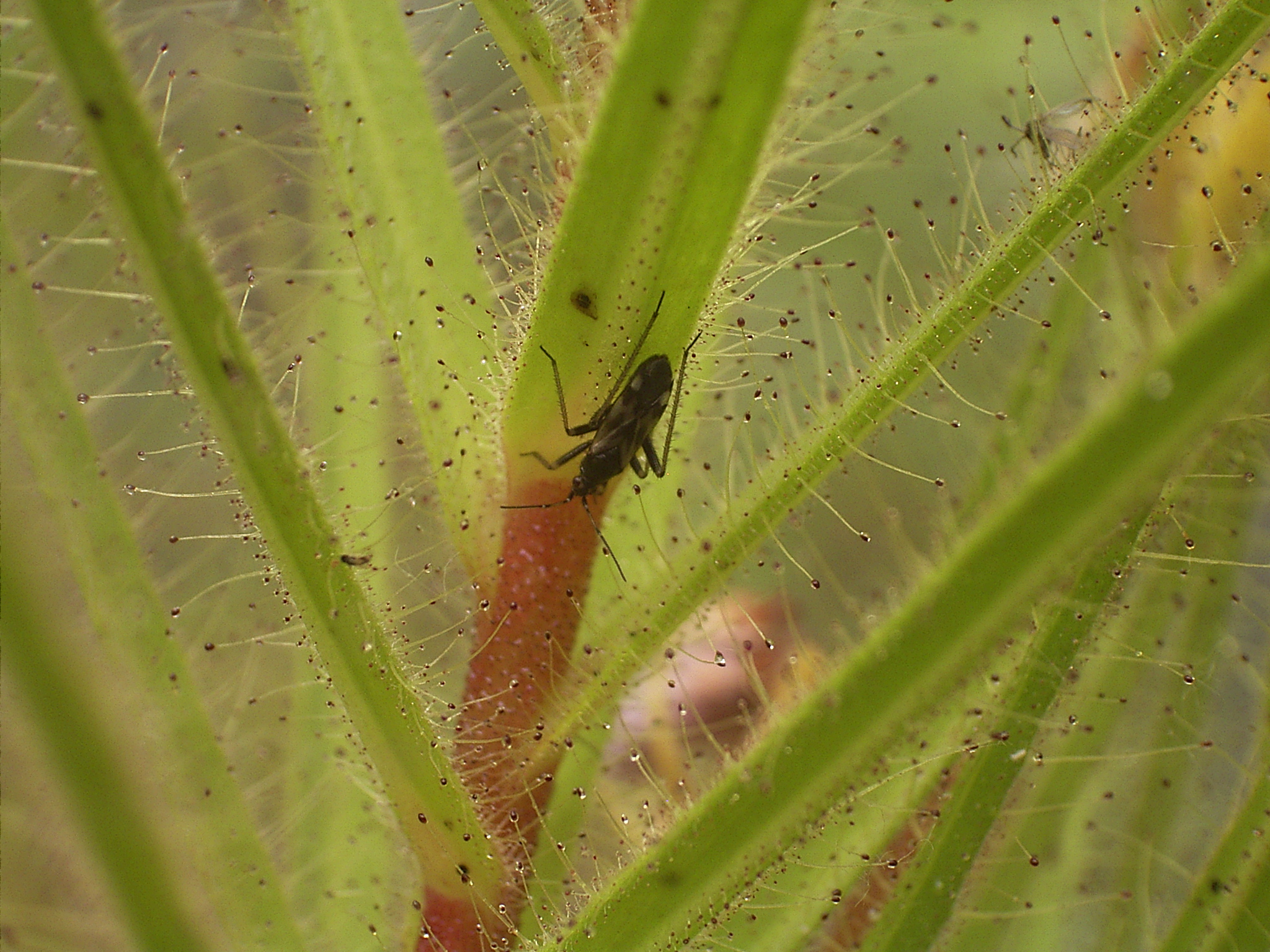
Pameridea roridulae on a Roridula gorgonias plant

The relationship with Roridula consists primarily of the fact that Roridula produces a resin that cannot digest captured insects like other carnivorous plants such as Dionaea muscipula, Drosera, Pinguicula, and Nepenthes. Thus, P. roridulae and P. marlothii devour the trapped insects on the Roridula and then excrete waste that is consumable by the plant to supplement its diet, since it grows in nutrient poor soil. Without the Roridula, Pameridea cannot find a food source and ultimately die.

Because P. roridulae and P. marlothii eat and digest the food for the plant, some carnivorous plant enthusiasts consider Roridula only sub-carnivorous. However, Sarracenia purpurea uses a variety of worms to digest captured arthropods for them, as does Darlingtonia californica, and these plants are generally considered carnivorous. Pameridea have special feet with hairs on them that allow them to run through the plants' resin without being caught in it.
