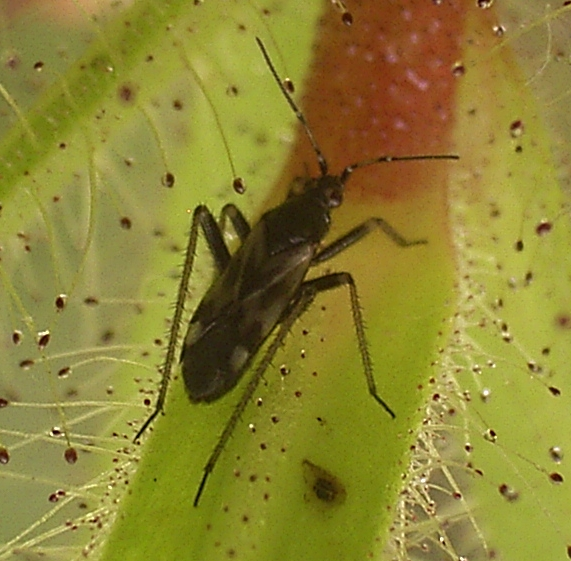

Scientific classification
- Kingdom: Animalia
- Phylum: Arthropoda
- Clade: Pancrustacea
- Class: Insecta
- Order: Hemiptera
- Suborder: Heteroptera
- Family: Miridae
- Genus: Pameridea
- Species: P. roridulae

Binomial name
- Pameridea roridulae Reuter, 1907

= Pameridea roridulae =

Species of tree bug

Pameridea roridulae is a species of jumping tree bug in the family Miridae. It has a symbiotic relationship with Roridula, where it feeds on trapped insects and its excretions are absorbed through the leaves of the Roridula, giving the plant much needed nutrients and nitrogen. Juvenile P. roridulae also pollinate the plant.
