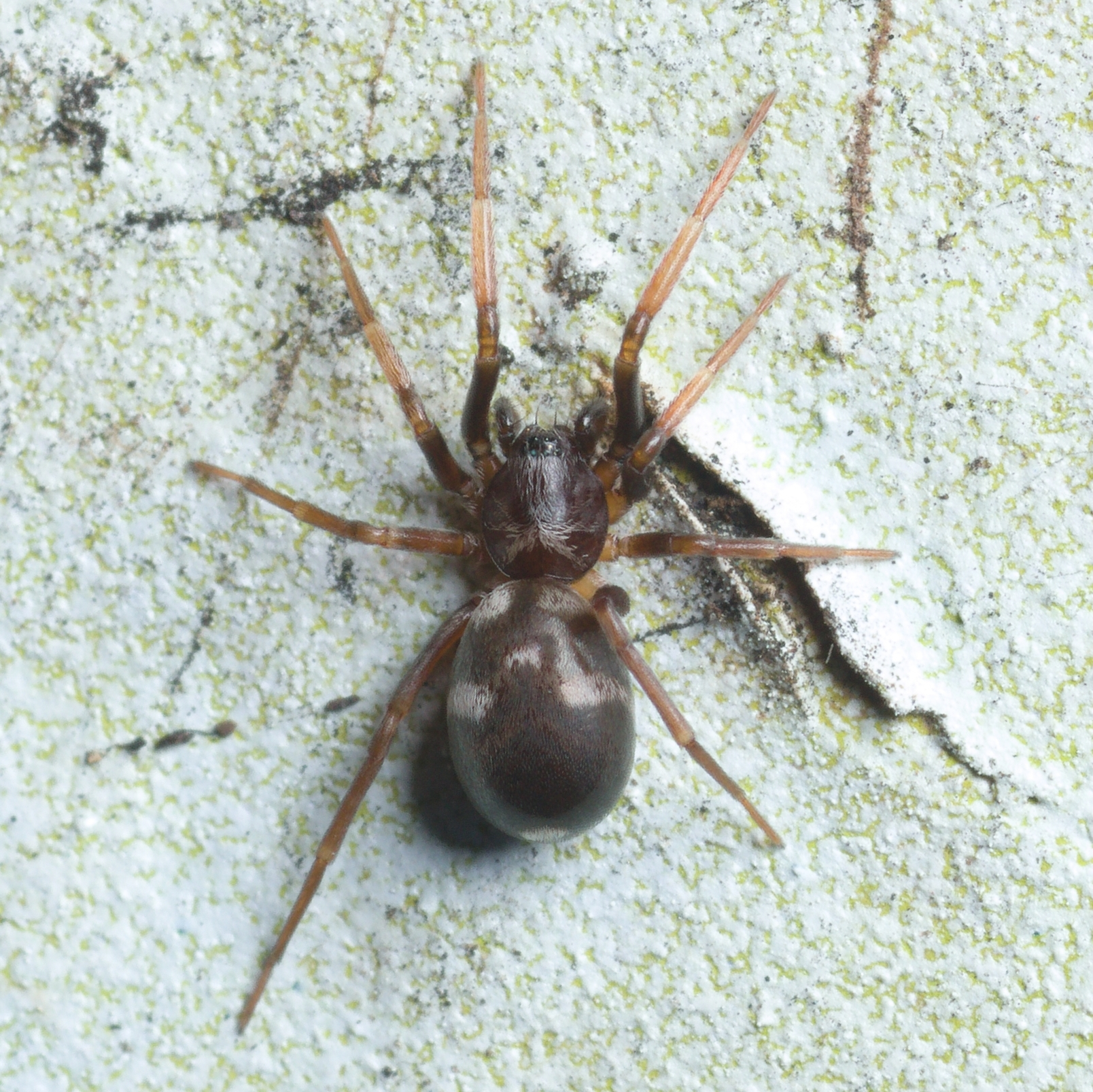
- Female

Scientific classification
- Kingdom: Animalia
- Phylum: Arthropoda
- Subphylum: Chelicerata
- Class: Arachnida
- Order: Araneae
- Infraorder: Araneomorphae
- Family: Phrurolithidae
- Genus: Phrurolithus
- Species: P. festivus

Binomial name
- Phrurolithus festivus (C. L. Koch, 1835)

= Phrurolithus festivus =

Species of spider

Phrurolithus festivus is a spider in the family Phrurolithidae. It was originally distributed only in the Palaearctic and was introduced into Canada. The highly adaptable species inhabits a variety of both dry and wet habitats and can also be found in man-made habitats, but generally prefers open areas.

A special characteristic of P. festivus, which it shares with other Phrurolithidae species, is the imitation of ants in the form of Batesian mimicry. To do this, the species imitates the movements of ants and also mimics them visually. According to the principle of Batesian mimicry, this imitation serves as a deterrent to predators, since ants are unpopular prey for many predators due to their defensiveness.

Phrurolithus festivus, which is diurnal like all species of the genus, also moves around quickly according to the peculiarity of Phrurolithus and preys on any arthropods smaller than the hunter itself as an active running hunter. Mating is not preceded by courtship behavior. A mated female lays several egg cocoons with comparatively few eggs some time after mating. Otherwise, the life cycle of the spider is little studied.

== Characteristics ==
According to Sven Almquist (2006), the female of P. festivus can reach a body length of 2.7 up to 3.8 as well as an average of 3.1 ± 0.2 and the male one of 2.6 up to 3 as well as an average of 2.8 ± 0.1 millimeters. Thus, like all Phrurolithidae, it is a smaller spider species. The basic body structure of the spider resembles that of other Phrurolithus.

The leg formula, as in many spiders, is 4-1-2-3.

Arrangement of the spines on the two front pairs of legs according to Cleopatra Sterghiu (1985)
Leg pair	Femur (thigh)	Tibia (splint)	Metatarsus (Heel link)
1	v1, d1, pl1	5 pairs in 2 rows	spines arranged in the formation 4,4 or 2,4 in a row
2	–	4,4	spines arranged in the formation 4,4 or 2,4 in a row

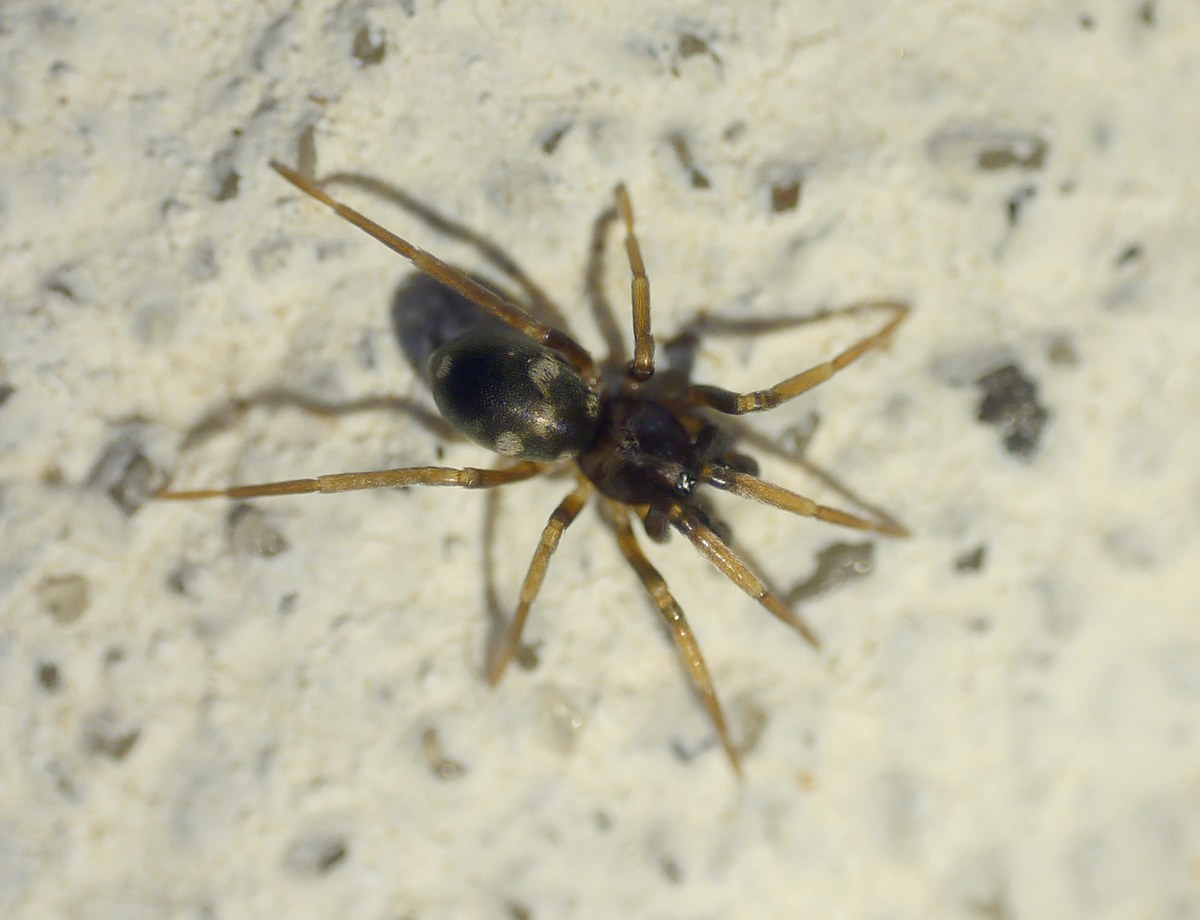
Male

Legend for indicated directional positions:

- d = dorsal (above)
- pl = prolateral (laterally in front)
- v = ventral (below)

In this species, the opisthosoma (abdomen) appears angled and about the same width anteriorly (front) as posteriorly (back).

=== Sexual dimorphism ===
Phrurolithus festivus, like many spiders, exhibits a pronounced sexual dimorphism (difference in sexes). This is noticeable not only in the dimensions but also in the coloration of females and males. In addition, as is common in Phrurolithus, the male has a scutum (sclerotized, or hardened plate) on the opisthosoma, which the female lacks.

==== Female ====
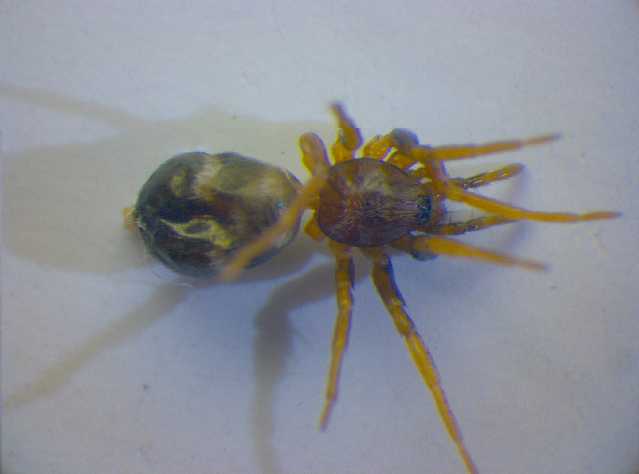
Prepared female in the Zoological State Collection Munich with one leg missing here

In the female, according to Almquist, the carapace (dorsal shield of the prosoma, or anterior body) can have a length of 1.04 up to 1.35 and an average of 1.2 ± 0.06, and a width of 0.86 up to 1.09 and an average of 0.97 ± 0.05 millimeters. The ratio between the length and width of the carapace is 1.16 to 1.34 in the female, with an average value here of 1.23 ± 0.05. The carapace is also inclined at 52 degrees in the female.

The carapace of the female is dark yellowish brown and the chelicerae (jaw claws) are brownish in color. Promarginal (inside anteriorly) the chelicerae each have three teeth and retromarginal (inside posteriorly) one tooth. The sternum (thoracic shield of the prosoma) has a brown ground color, with a darker coloration marginally going into the width. The legs are yellowish brown in color, and the femora (thighs) appear darker.

Lengths of the legs of the female in millimeters with a body length of 3 up to 3.5 millimeters according to Sterghiu
Leg pair	Femur	Patella (limb between femur and tibia)	Tibia (splint)	Metatarsus (calcaneal phalanx)	Tarsus (foot link)	Total length
1	0,84	0,41	0,99	0,79	0,48	3,51
2	0,89	0,38	0,64	0,71	0,46	3,08
3	0,74	0,35	0,51	0,71	0,46	2,77
4	1,04	0,41	0,94	107	0,6	4,06

The opisthosoma of the female has dorsally a dark brown ground coloration as well as iridescent setae (chitinized hairs). Anterolaterally (anteriorly lateral) there are two white spots on the opisthosoma, while median (centrally) on this part of the body there is a white zigzag band. Not infrequently, there are narrow and pale angular spots posteriorly on the opisthosoma. Ventrally, the opisthosoma appears grayish and it also has small pale spots there.

Female views

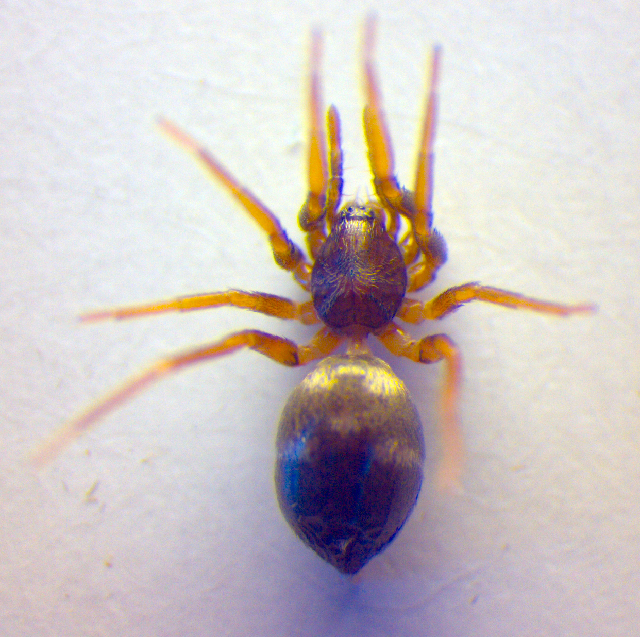
Dorsal view (another prepared specimen in the Zoologische Staatssammlung Munich)

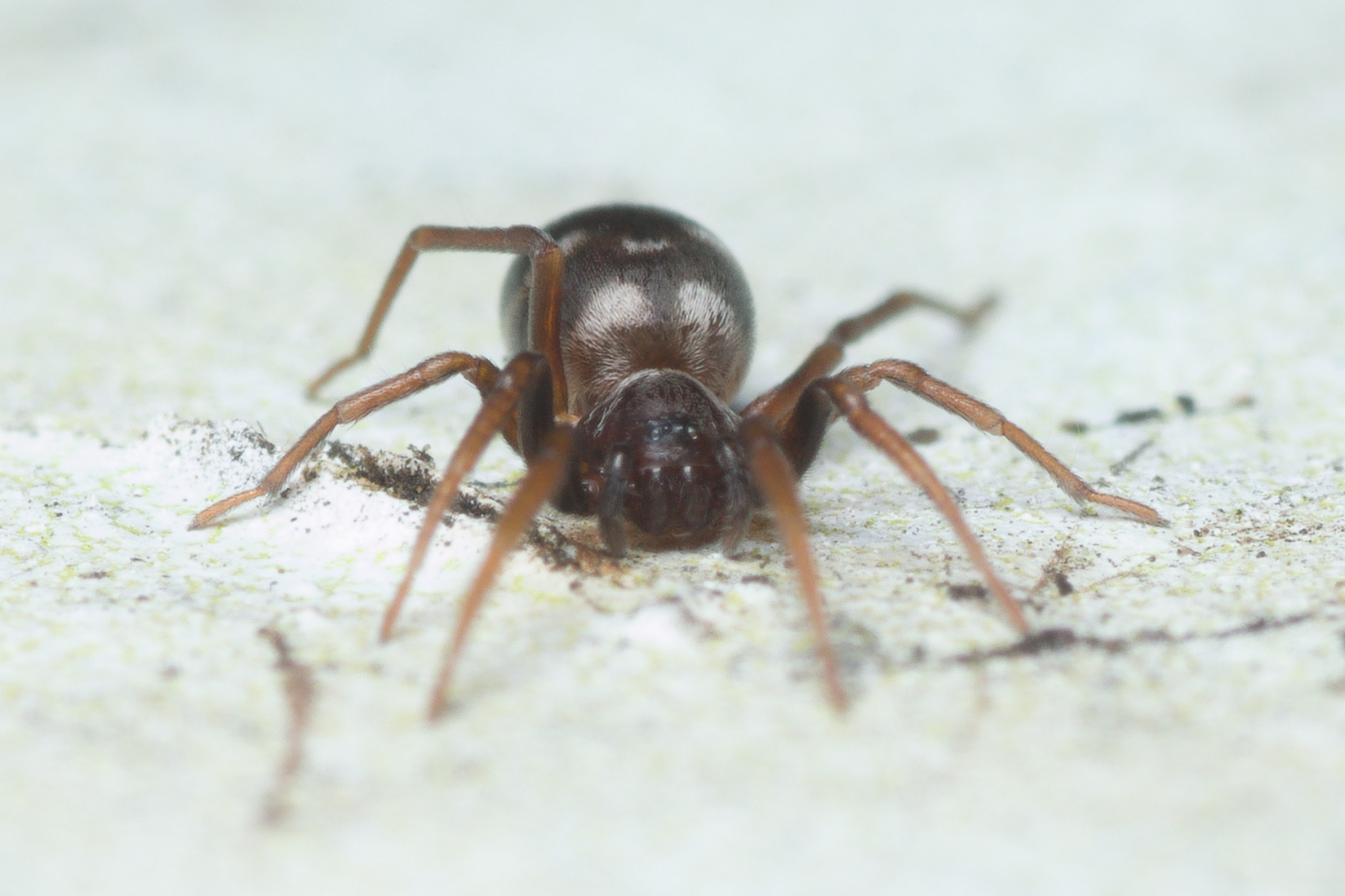
Frontal view

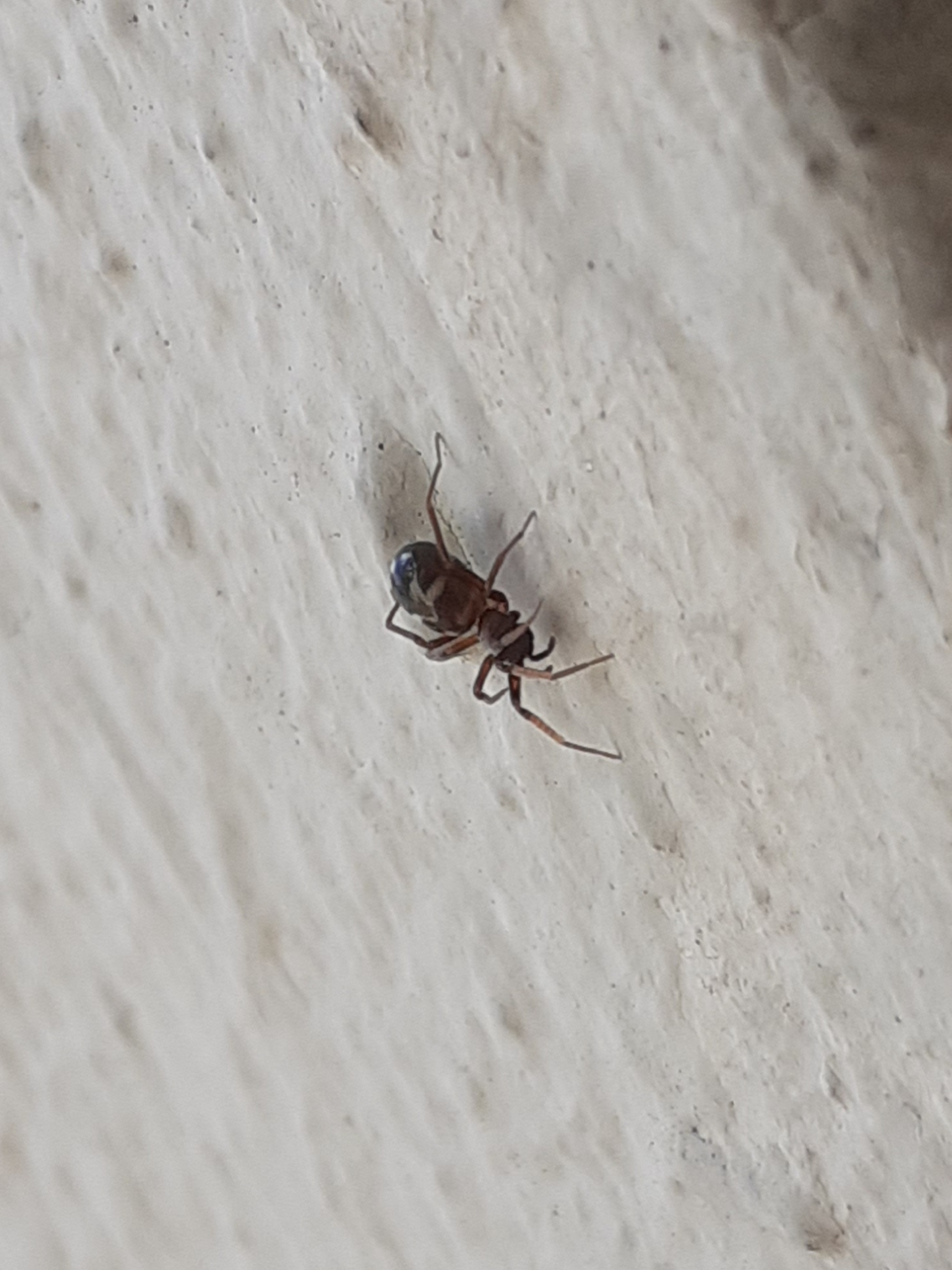
Lateral view

==== Male ====
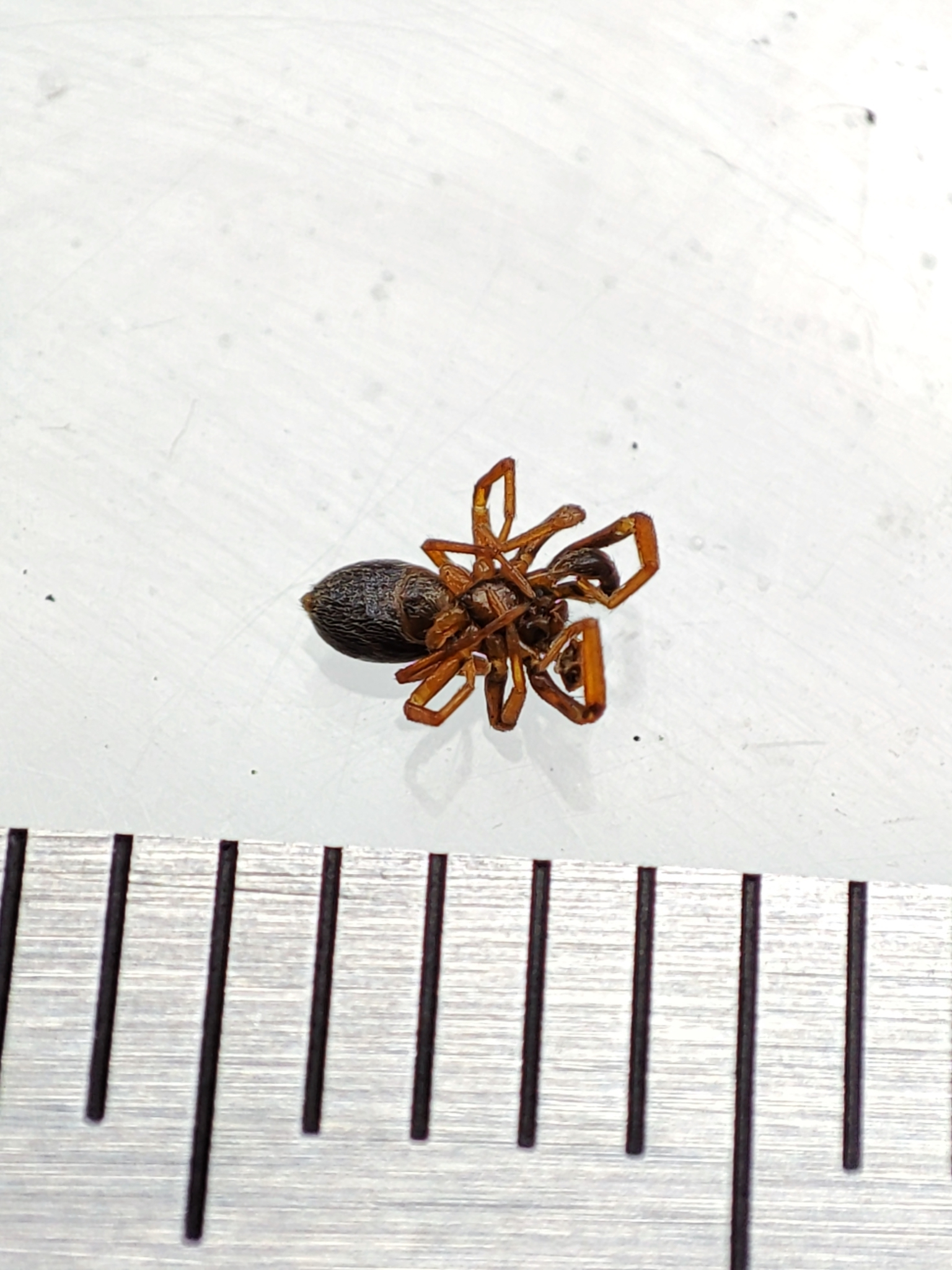
Dead male ventral size comparison

In the male, the carapace is 1.2 to 1.38 and on average 1.27 ± 0.04 millimeters long and 0.97 to 1.2 and on average 1.06 ± 0.05 millimeters wide. The length-to-width ratio of the carapace here is 1.13 to 1.3 and mostly 1.21 ± 0.04, and its inclination is 28 degrees.

The carapace of the male has a dark brown coloration and is covered medially on the cephalic (head) area with white and posteriorly with radial rows of equally white setae. The chelicerae of the male are dark brown in coloration and, unlike those of the female, do not bear teeth. The sternum is brown colored as in the female and marginally darker, but here less projecting. The legs of the male have a yellowish brown basic coloration. Here the femora are dark brown and the coxae (hip limbs) as well as the trochanters (thigh rings) are light yellowish brown in color.

Lengths of the legs of the female in millimeters with a body length of 2.45 up to 3 millimeters according to Sterghiu
Leg pair	Femur	Patella	Tibia	Metatarsus	Tarsus	Total length
1	0,92	0,43	0,84	0,81	0,51	3,51
2	0,84	0,35	0,66	0,66	0,46	2,97
3	0,74	0,35	0,51	0,69	0,43	2,72
4	1,04	0,43	0,89	1,07	0,58	4,01

The dorsal side of the opisthosoma shows a black coloration in the male, while there are two spot-like formations of white setae anterolaterally. As in the female, a white zigzag band runs median on the dorsal side of the opisthosoma in the male. Additionally, in the male there is a tuft of white setae on the apex (tip) of the opisthosoma. The ventral surface of the opisthosoma here is yellowish brown to brown in color.

Male views

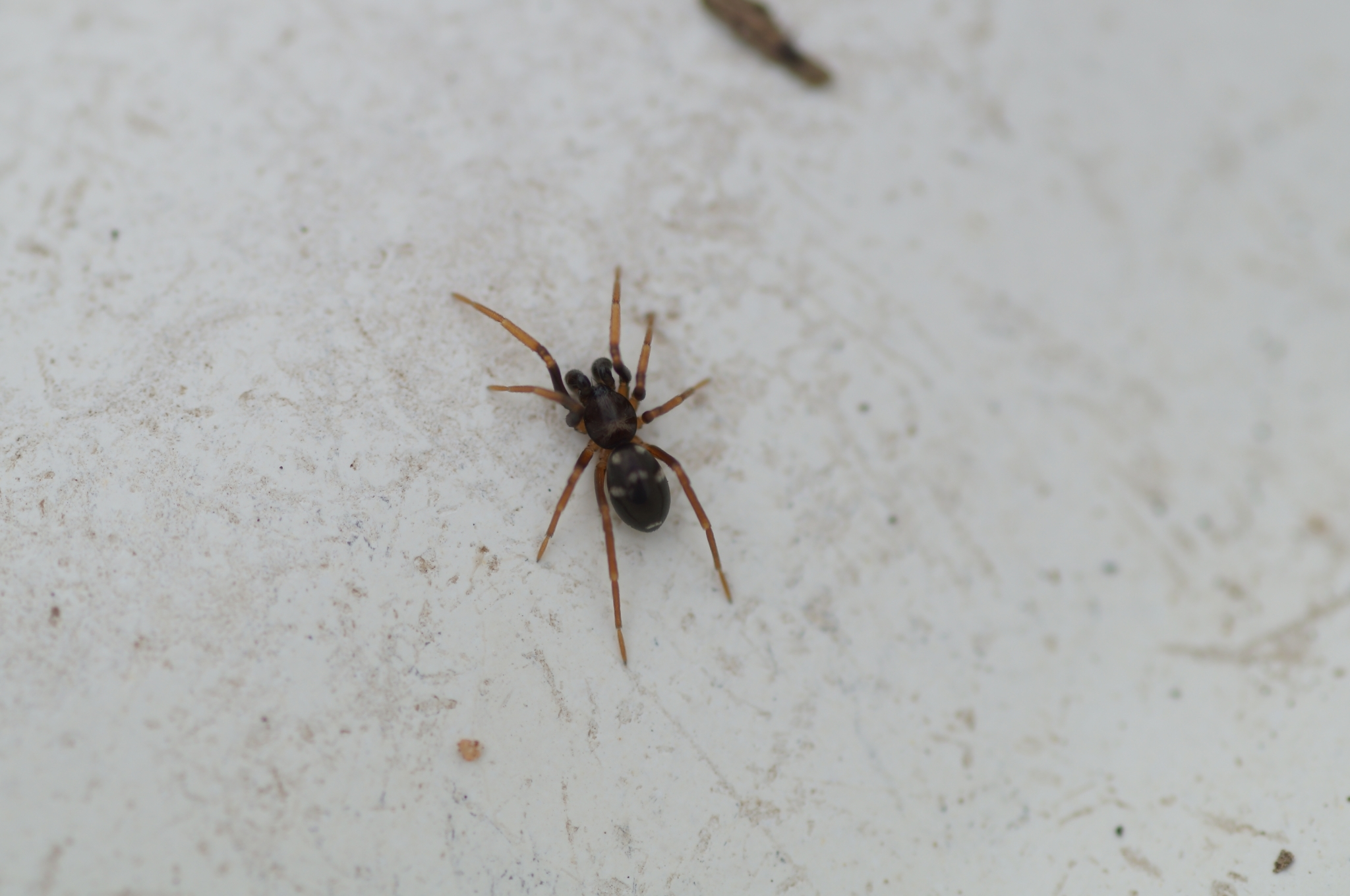
Dorsal view

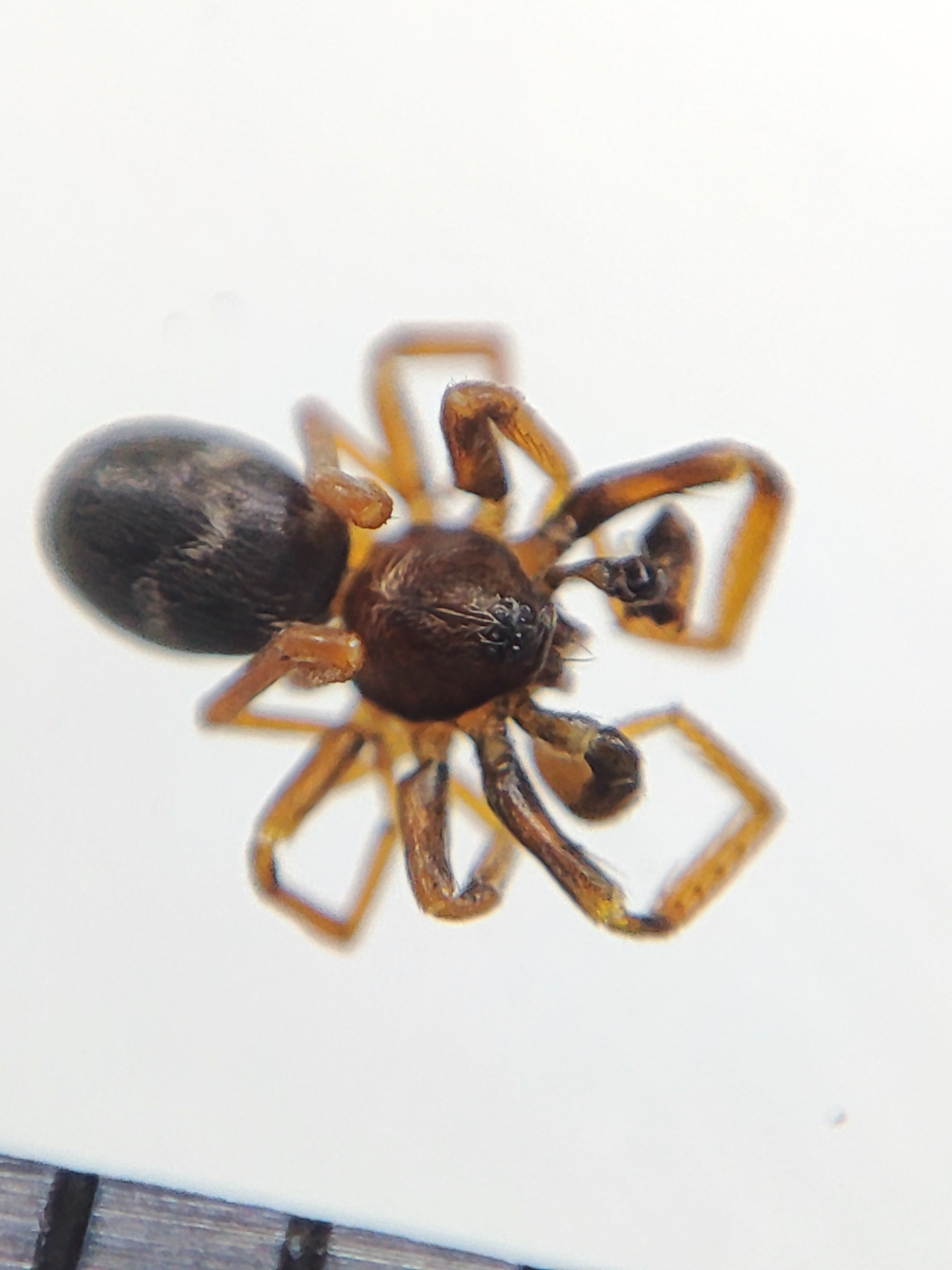
Frontal view, dead find.

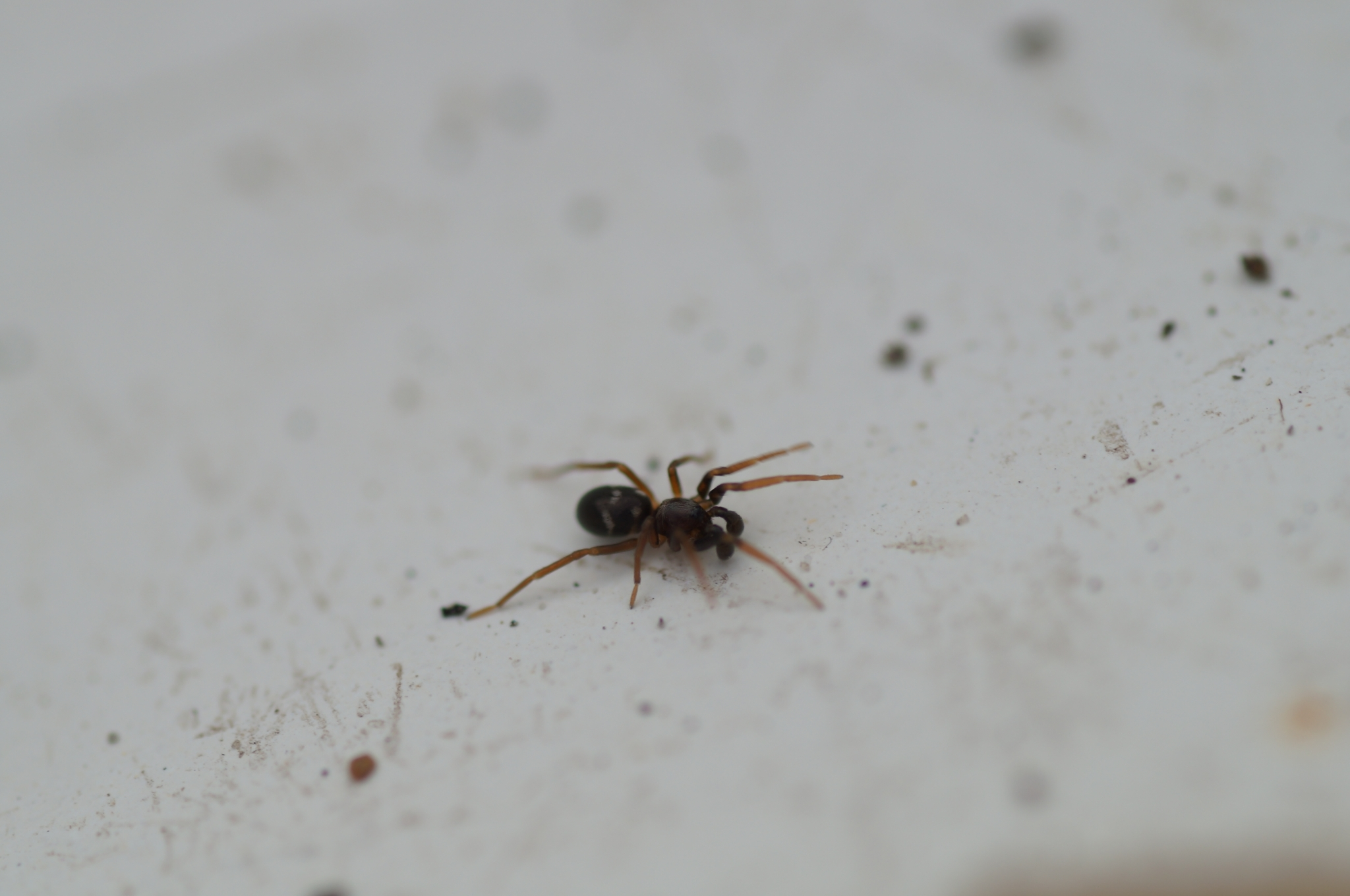
Lateral view

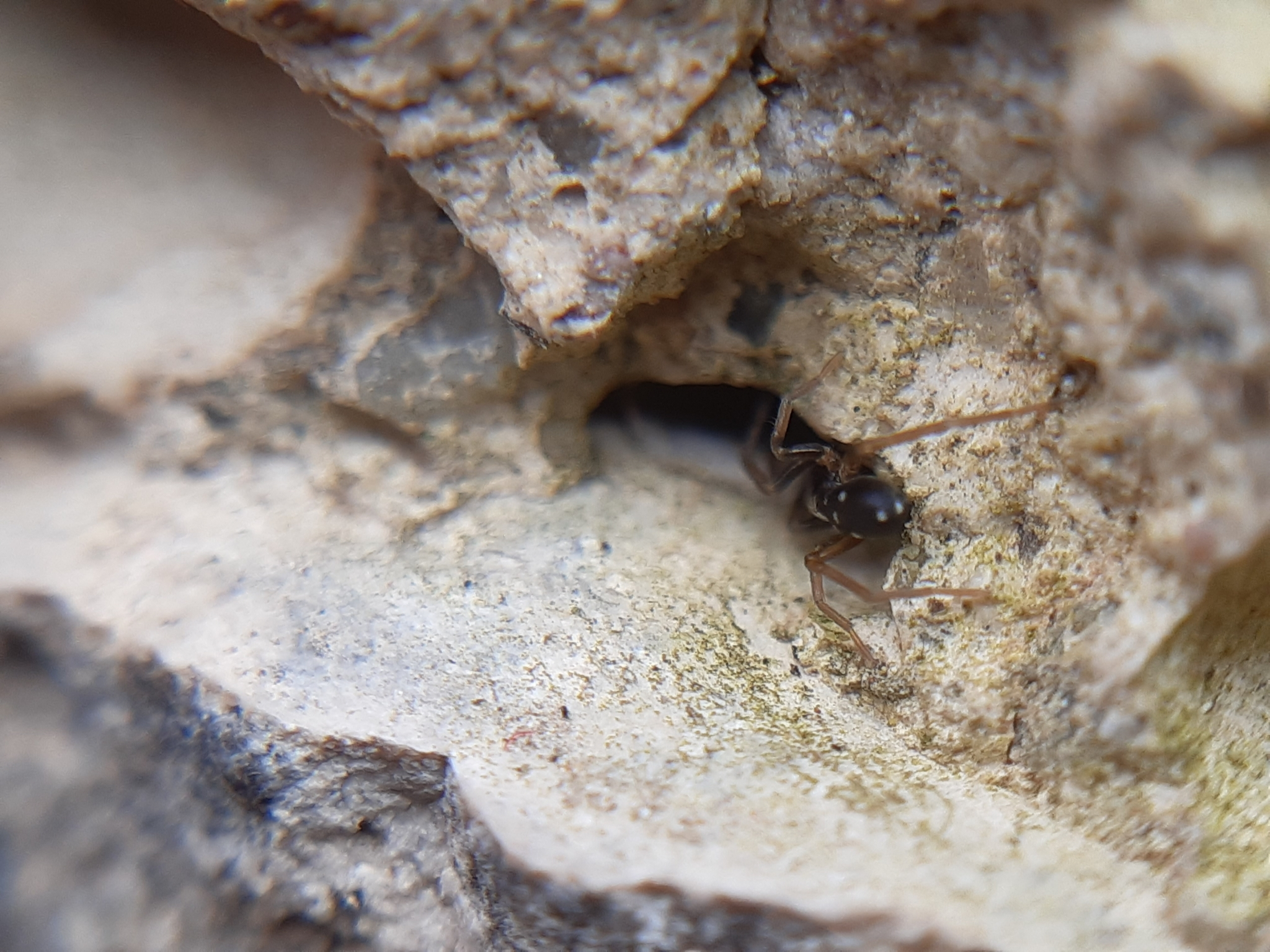
Back view

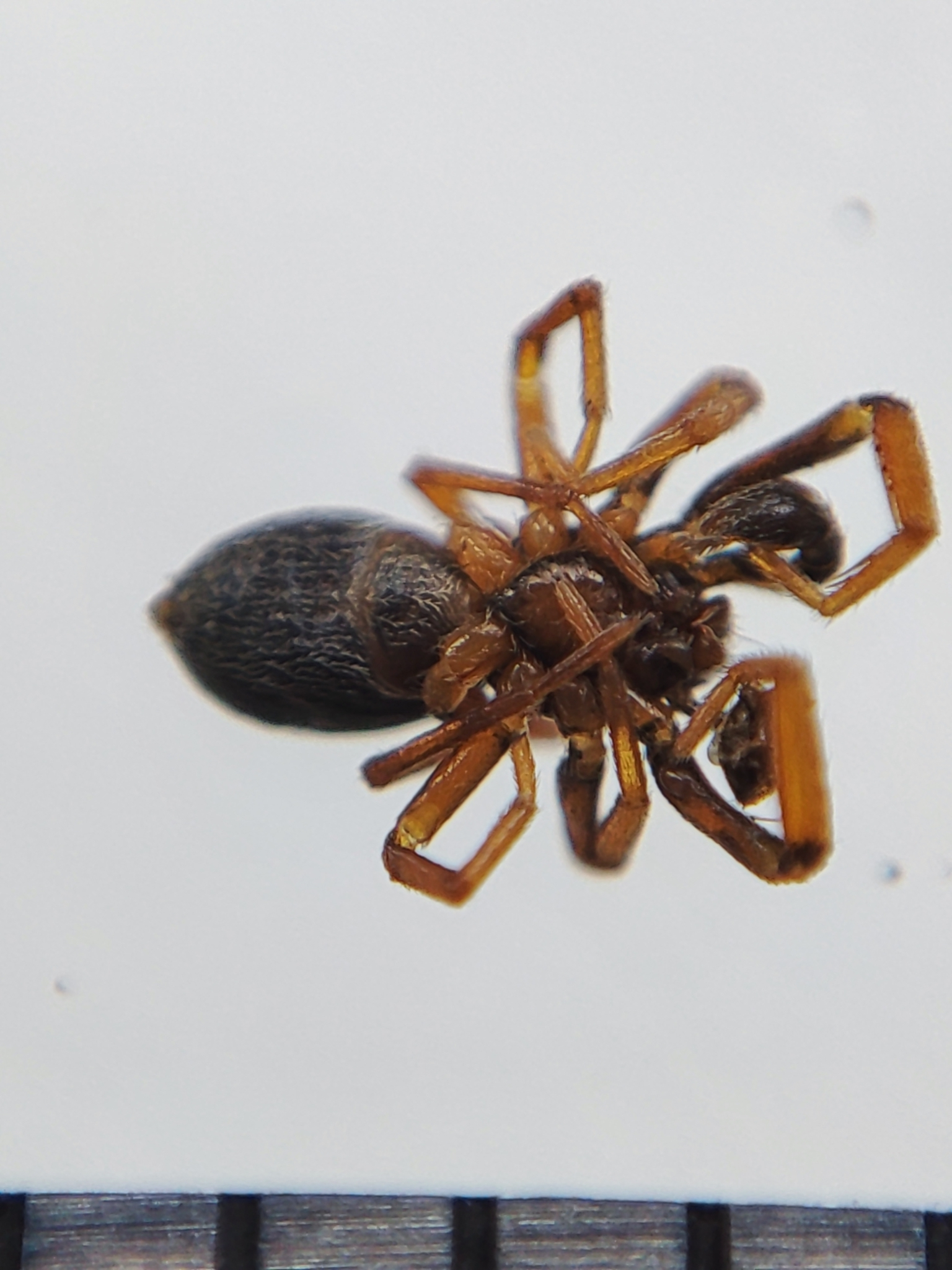
Ventral view, found dead.

=== Genital morphological characteristics ===
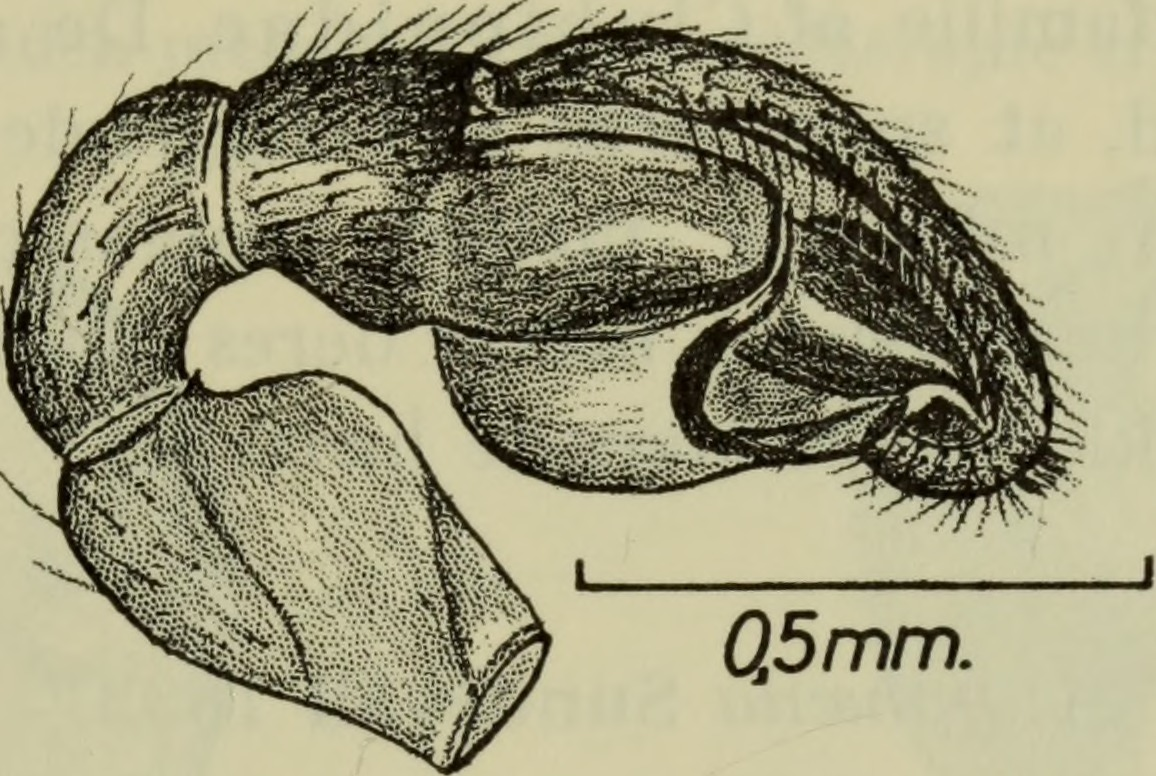
Detail from "Danmarks fauna; illustrerede haandbøger over den danske dyreverden.." (1907), showing the schematic of a bulb of the common ant vagabund

The pedipalps (transformed extremities) from the male of P. festivus are almost black in color. At the same time the femora appear dark brown. A single pedipalpus can sometimes be distinguished from those of other male Phrurolithus by the retrolateral (laterally recessed) apophysis (chitinized process) on its tibia (splint), which is very large in comparison here and has a shovel-shaped appearance. The basal (located at the base) part of a bulb (male sex organ) of the species is prominent. Another tegular (posterior) apophysis on each of the two pedipalps is broadly built in P. festivus and has a curved tip. The curved embolus (third and last sclerite or hard part of a bulb) appears peg-like.

The epigyne (female sex organ) of P. festivus is sometimes characterized within the genus by its posteriorly sclerotized (hardened) plate. In addition, the sex organ projects slightly beyond the epigastric (located at the stomach) furrow. The epigyne of has a rather smaller copulatory opening and the copulatory ducts are comparatively short and wide. The primary spermathecae (seminal pockets) of the species are transverse (transversely) laid out, and the secondary ones are large and oval shaped.

=== Differentiation from other Phrurolithus ===
Since all Phrurolithus including P. festivus are very similar to each other and especially the spot pattern is presumably present in such a way in all species of the genus, a differentiation of these as well as of P. festivus is only given on the basis of the genital morphological characteristics.

In Phrurolithus minimus the pedipalps of the male are black striped and a single tibial apophysis attached to it is strongly curved. A bulb here has one apophysis each distal (away from the center of the body), tapering and curved. The epigyne of P. minimus has copulatory openings located medially. For Phrurolithus nigrinus, the curved tibial apophysis with a long, separated apex on a single pedipalpus in the male is most typical, while the epigyne of the species is characterized by a large median pit. The epigyne of P. nigrinus is characterized by a large median pit. For the male of Phrurolithus pullatus is typical with symmetrical tip equipped tibial apophysis on a pedipalpus. Furthermore, here one bulb has two distal apophyses each, which overhang the embolus. The epigyne of this species has laterally situated copulatory openings. In Phrurolithus szilyi, the fifth species occurring in Central Europe, the tibial apophysis on a pedipalpus of the male is provided with a little separated apex and a bulbus with broad and roundish distal apophysis. The epigyne, similar to that of P. nigrinus, has a large median pit, but here it appears indented on the anterior margin.

== Incidence ==
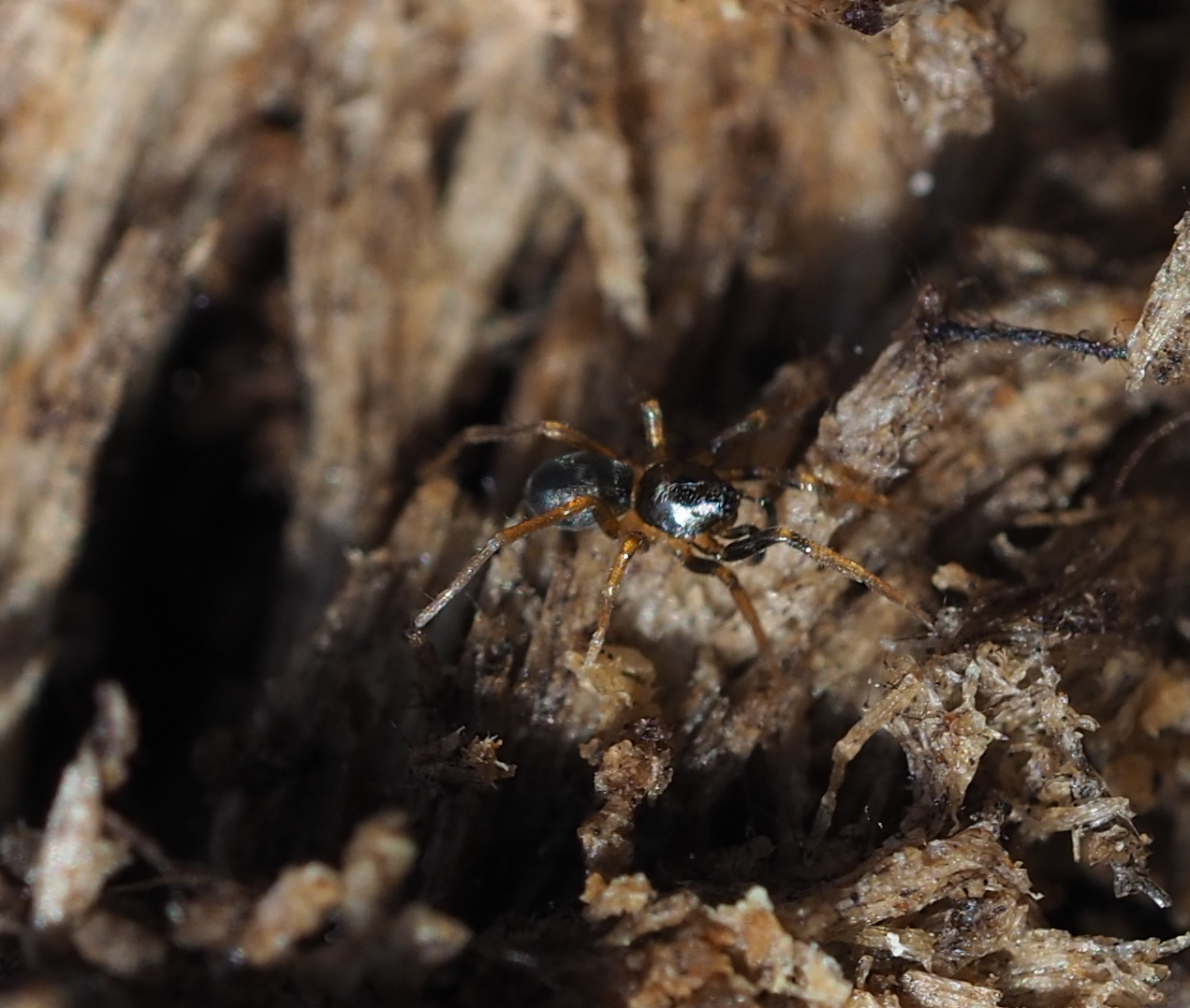
Male on grove, found near Volkmarsen in the north Hessian district of Waldeck-Frankenberg

The original range of P. festivus extended over Europe, North Africa, Turkey, Caucasia, Russia (European to Far Eastern part), Kazakhstan, Iran, China, Korea, Japan. In Canada it was introduced moreover. Also in Europe itself the species is represented area-wide and is missing in continental Europe only in Croatia, Bosnia and Herzegovina and Kosovo as well as additionally on the Russian double island Novaya Zemlya, in Franz-Josef-Land, Iceland and on the archipelago Spitsbergen, Sardinia, the Balearic Islands, Crete and Cyprus. In North Africa, records of the spider from Tunisia and Egypt are lacking.

Phrurolithus festivus is widespread especially in Western and Central Europe. On Great Britain it is common especially in the southern part of the island, while its occurrence there is highly scattered in the west. To the north, the species' range on Britain extends into the central part of Scotland.

=== Habitats ===
Phrurolithus festivus inhabits a wide range of both dry and wet habitats (habitats) and has sometimes been recorded in grasslands, gardens, litter layers, and the underside of stones. The same is true near water-filled pits and the underside of stones in quarries. Other proven habitats of the species include dry grasslands, dune heaths, ground litter under juniper (Juniperus), and the underside of stones on limestone surfaces. The spider has also been recorded in vineyards, sunny forests, and on beaches.

Phrurolithus festivus can be found at altitudes up to 1,350 meters above sea level. In the United Kingdom, this altitude is limited to 700 meters above sea level.

=== Hazard ===
The population situation of P. festivus is evaluated differently depending on the country. In Germany, for example, it is very common and its populations there are considered to be stable in both the long and short term. Because of this, the species is classified as "not endangered" in the Red List of Threatened Species of Animals, Plants and Fungi of Germany (2016). The same was also the case in the previous version of this Red List from 1996. The spider is also included in the same category in the Red List of Spiders of Carinthia (1999).

Similar to Germany and Carinthia, P. festivus is listed in the UK Red List (2017) in the category LC ("Least Concern", or not endangered) according to IUCN standards. The same is the case for the Red List of Arachnids (Arachnida) of Norway (2015), while the spider is included in the Red List of Spiders of the Czech Republic (2015) in the category ES ("Ecologically Sustainable", or ecologically adaptable), considering the population situation there. The spider is listed in the Red List of Arachnids of the Czech Republic (2015) in the category ES ("Ecologically Sustainable", or ecologically adaptable).

== Lifestyle ==
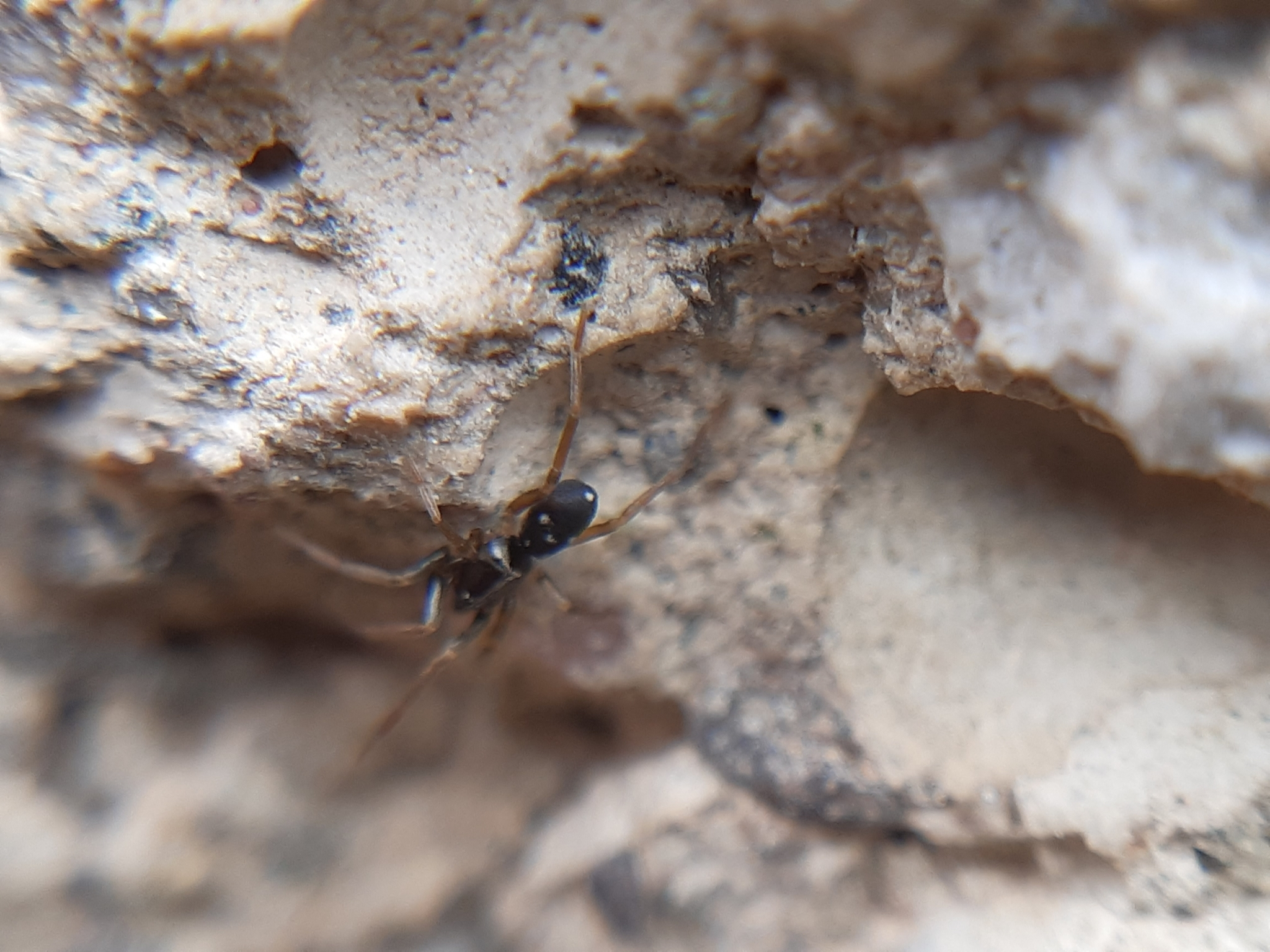
Male active on rock during the day

Phrurolithus festivus, like all Phrurolithus, is diurnal and, like the other species of the genus, moves about nimbly on sunlit and open surfaces, such as the surface of the ground or tree bark. At night, the spider then hides in crevices of tree bark, litter layers, or under rocks. Also, like other Phrurolithus, it mimics ants in the form of Bates' mimicry, in keeping with its trivial name. Possible model species of P. festivus are the Formica fusca'', Formica rufa, and Formica sanguinea from the genus Formica as well as Lasius flavus, Lasius fuliginosus, Lasius Niger from the genus Lasius. Because the spider can often be found in the company of ants, it is thought to be a myrmecophile (attachment to ants).

Due to its myrmecomorphic (ant-imitating) characteristic, P. festivus is well protected from possible predators (predators), since ants are mostly unpopular prey due to their defensiveness and the spider itself is very reminiscent of them due to its myrmecomorphic appearance. Similarly, P. festivus is also largely safe from the ants through protective measures, such as avoiding the ants itself. Thus, like many myrmecomorph spiders, P. festivus has significantly higher chances of survival compared to spiders that lack this characteristic. The circadian (sleep-wake rhythm related) activity of the species ranges from about 7:00 a.m. to 9:00 p.m. during the day and thus largely corresponds to that of the trail ants.

=== Hunting behavior and prey spectrum ===
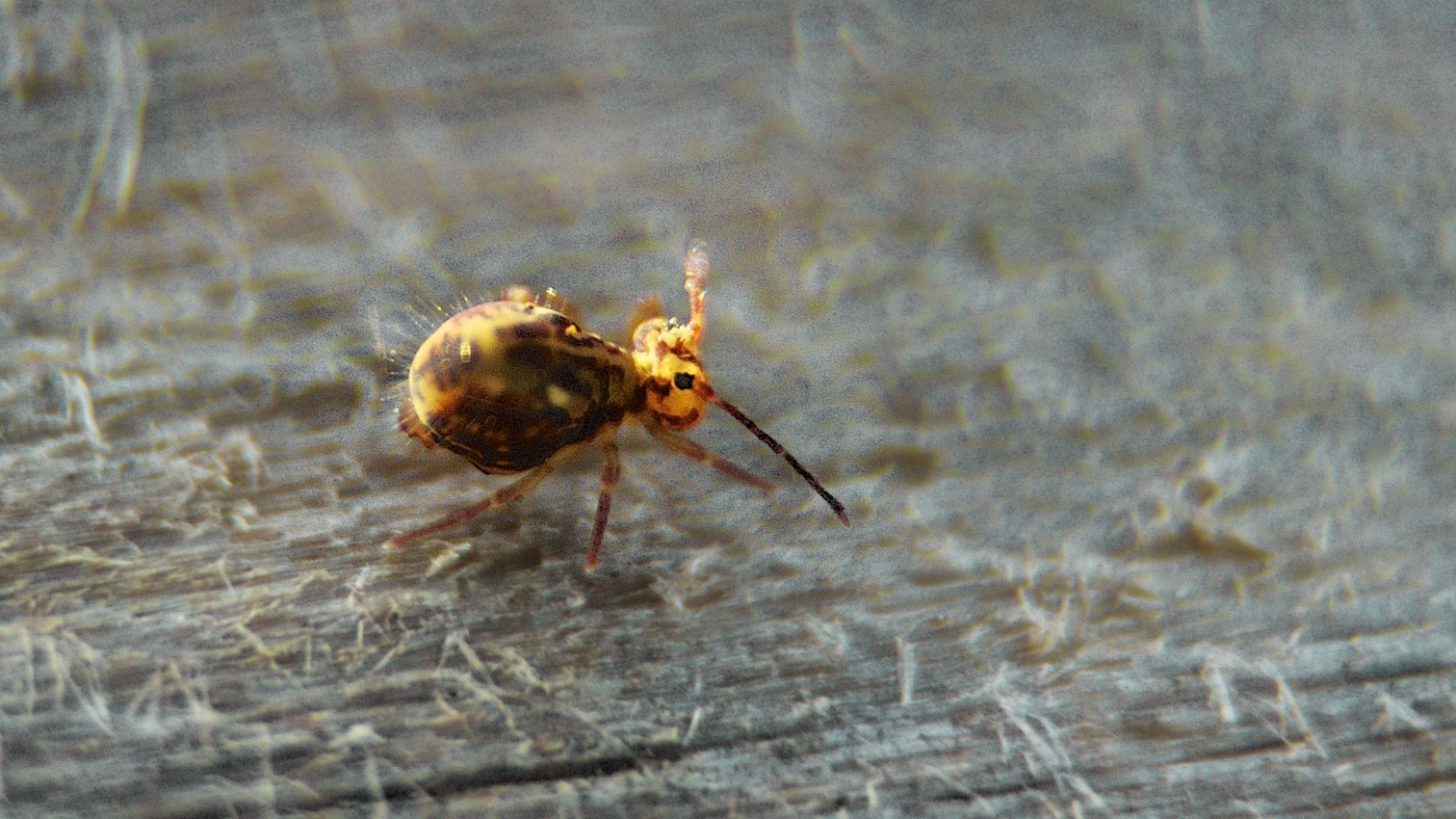
Sometimes springtails (Collembola) form common prey of P. festivus

Phrurolithus festivus, which like all spiders is predatory, is a running hunter that does not create a spider web to catch prey. Prey animals are actively sought out by the species and then seized. A spider toxin from the spider then prevents a seized prey animal from both escaping and fighting back.

Phrurolithus festivus is euryphagous (not dependent on specific food) and consequently an opportunistic hunter that preys on other arthropods. However, preference is given to those that do not exceed the size of the spider's prosoma. In captivity, the killing of springtails (Collembola), fruit flies (Drosophilidae) and homopterans (Homoptera), and thus of prey smaller than 70% of the body length of the spider, has been demonstrated. Some smaller invertebrates, including springtails and mites, do not receive attention from the ants where P. festivus resides and can therefore be used by it as food in large quantities. However, it has also been possible to document the capture of ants on the part of the spider. The spider has been known to prey on ants.

=== Life cycle and phenology ===
The life cycle of P. festivus, like other spiders, is divided into the stages of reproduction, oviposition and adolescence. The phenology (activity period) of adult individuals amounts to the period between February and October for the female of the species and between March and October for the male. The life cycle of the spider, in addition to the prey spectrum, was analyzed in parts in 2011 by Stano Pekar and Martin Jarab.

A male of P. festivus, if it gets close to a female, immediately rushes towards her and mating begins. A courtship behavior could not be proved in this species. According to Pekar and Jarab, mating takes an average of 252 ± 15.7 minutes and is performed in position III, in which the male remains above the female during mating, facing in the opposite direction. This process occurs in P. festivus during daylight hours and on open surfaces such as tree bark or the substrate, so unlike some other myrmecomorph spiders, mating here does not involve protective measures during reproduction. In some other spiders with this trait, such as the unrelated ant jumpers (Myrmarachne), mating takes place in a web.

Some time after mating, but still in the same year of mating, the female lays an average of 4 eggs in an egg cocoon. The egg clutches of P. festivus thus contain very few eggs compared to those of other spiders. Although this is also the case with other myrmecomorph spiders and can be attributed to the narrower opisthosoma in favor of the ant-like shape, the low number of laid eggs in P. festivus is probably due to the generally rather short body length of the species. If the body length is higher, the egg clutches may be larger, although the difference would not be significant. According to Pekar's and Jarab's observations, a mated female of P. festivus produces on average two egg cocoons in succession at certain time intervals. This comparatively low number of egg cocoons also occurs in some other myrmecomorph spiders, while more strongly myrmecomorph spiders with a constricted opisthosoma – including dwarf antspringer (Synageles) – however, produce a significantly higher number of these, with seven to eight cocoons. However, since cocoon numbers are significantly lower in less myrmecomorphic spiders, such as P. festivus, it has also been shown that iteroparity (ability to reproduce multiple times) is not affected by mimicry.

The young then grow through several feeding (molting) stages, as is common in spiders. It is not known how the newly hatched young of the spider disperse. The method of spider flight can be ruled out, as with other myrmecomorph spiders, since they usually prefer the vicinity of ants anyway.

== Function and theories on the evolution of myrmecomorphism. ==
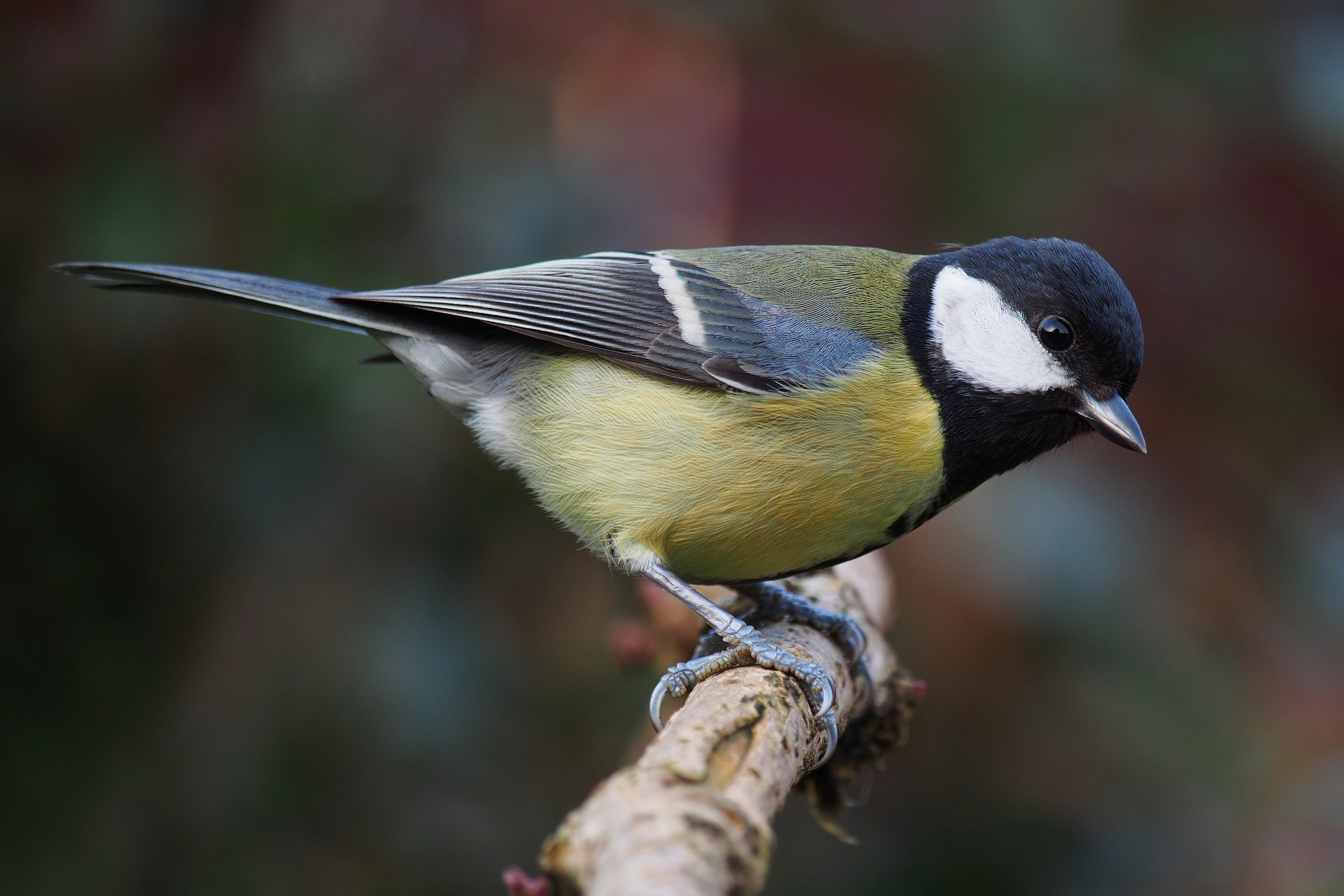
The Batesian mimicry of P. festivus probably protects it primarily from predators such as the great tit.

It is assumed that the myrmecomorphic appearance of spiders such as P. festivus has a deterrent effect, especially on birds. In addition, its myrmecomorphic appearance also serves as protection against other predators hunting by means of optical perception besides birds, such as reptiles like skinks. Unlike ants, which can defend themselves by means of their formic acid, P. festivus has no means of direct enemy defense, but its resemblance to ants makes it relatively safe from predators. However, the myrmecomorphic appearance of P. festivus, apart from predators that use their sense of sight for hunting, proves effective on those that hunt by means of chemical stimuli, including digger wasps (Spheciformes).It is assumed that these parasitoid wasps can identify their preferred prey, including spiders, on the basis of the chemical structure of its integument (outer body shell). Overall, digger wasps prey much less frequently on myrmecomorph spiders than others. Since the chemical compositions of the integument are identical in both myrmecomorph and nonmyrmecomorph spiders, more research is needed to determine whether and to what extent myrmecomorph spiders are actually more likely to be avoided by digger wasps.

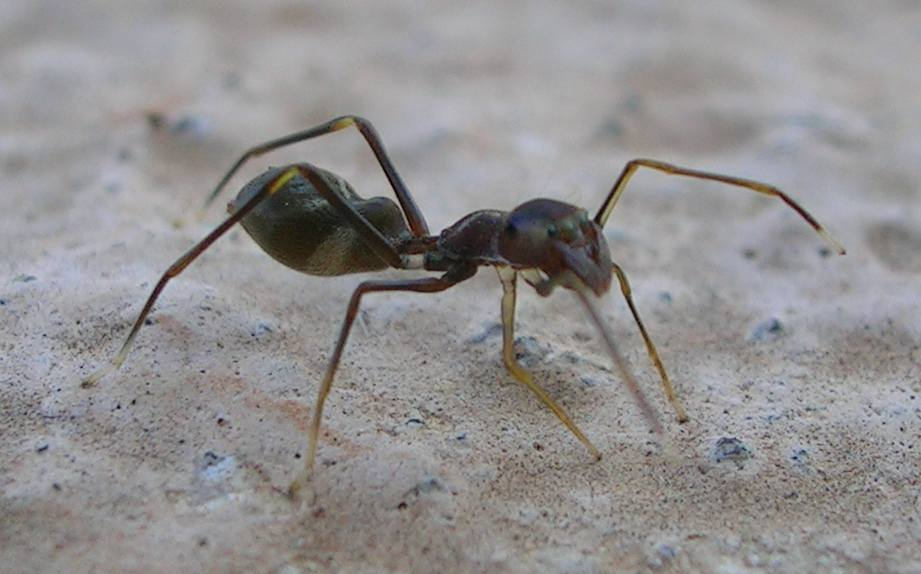
In some other myrmecomorphs, including ant jumpers (Myrmarachne), the resemblance to ants is even more pronounced than in the common ant vagrant.

Many other spiders that closely mimic the shape and coloration of ants are also called ant spiders, but P. festivus is not counted among them. It is less myrmecomorphic than, for example, spiders from the genus Myrmarachne, in which the resemblance to ants is even more pronounced due to the shape of the body and legs; these two habitual characteristics are missing in P. festivus. The latter species merely imitates its model species by its mode of movement and coloration. However, even the less myrmecomorphic appearance of P. festivus nevertheless proved to be just as effective protection, at least from birds, as that of more myrmecomorphic spiders. However, this may also be justifiable with the application of visual fecundity to visually hunting predators. Predatory invertebrates that hunt using visual senses, including mantis shrimp or jumping spiders (Salticidae), encounter a myrmecomorph spider at a much shorter distance and presumably perceive these spiders visually from a different perspective than birds do. The latter, however, search for prey visually from further distances; for example, the great tit makes out prey objects from distances of 30 centimeters.

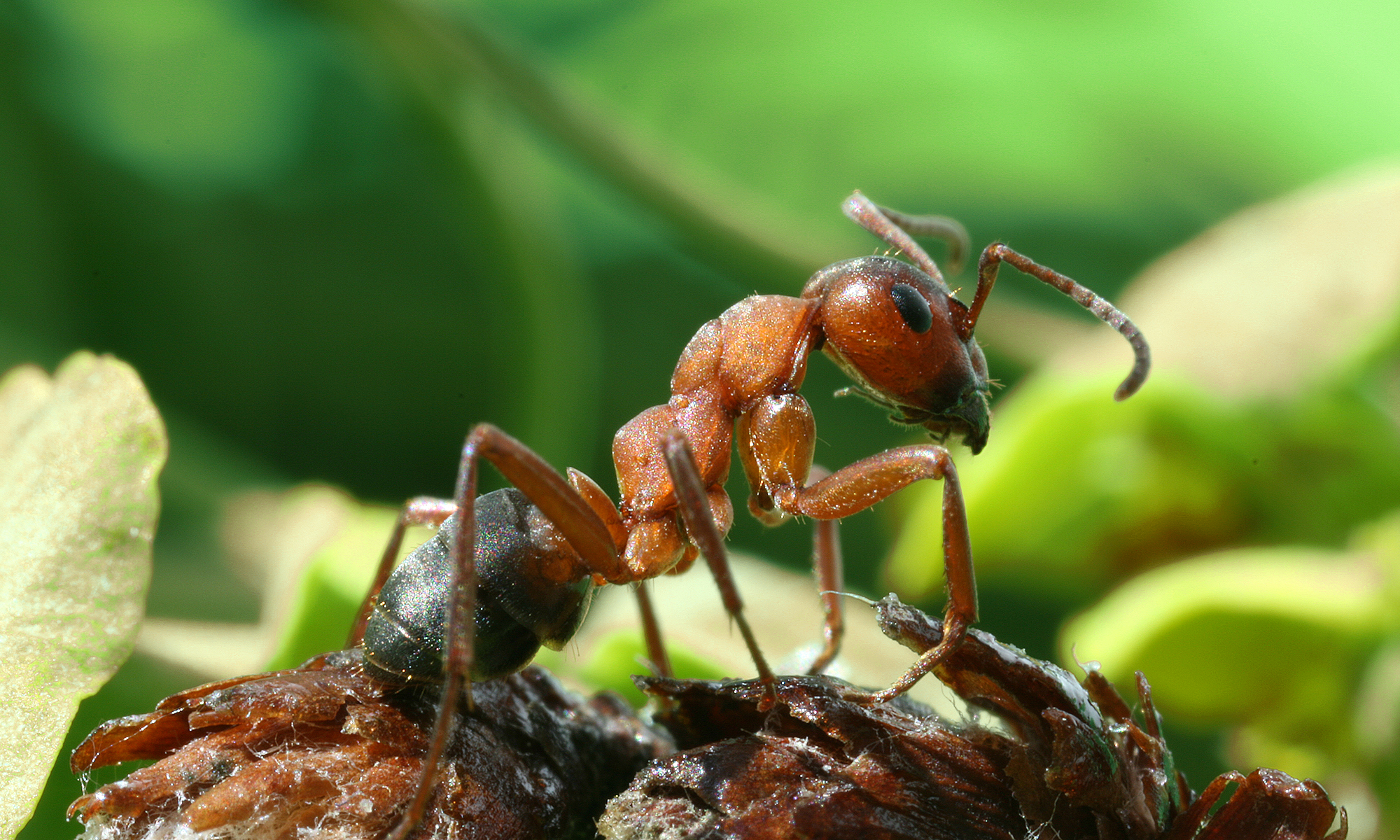
The rather defensible Formica rufa is a presumed model species of P. festivus.

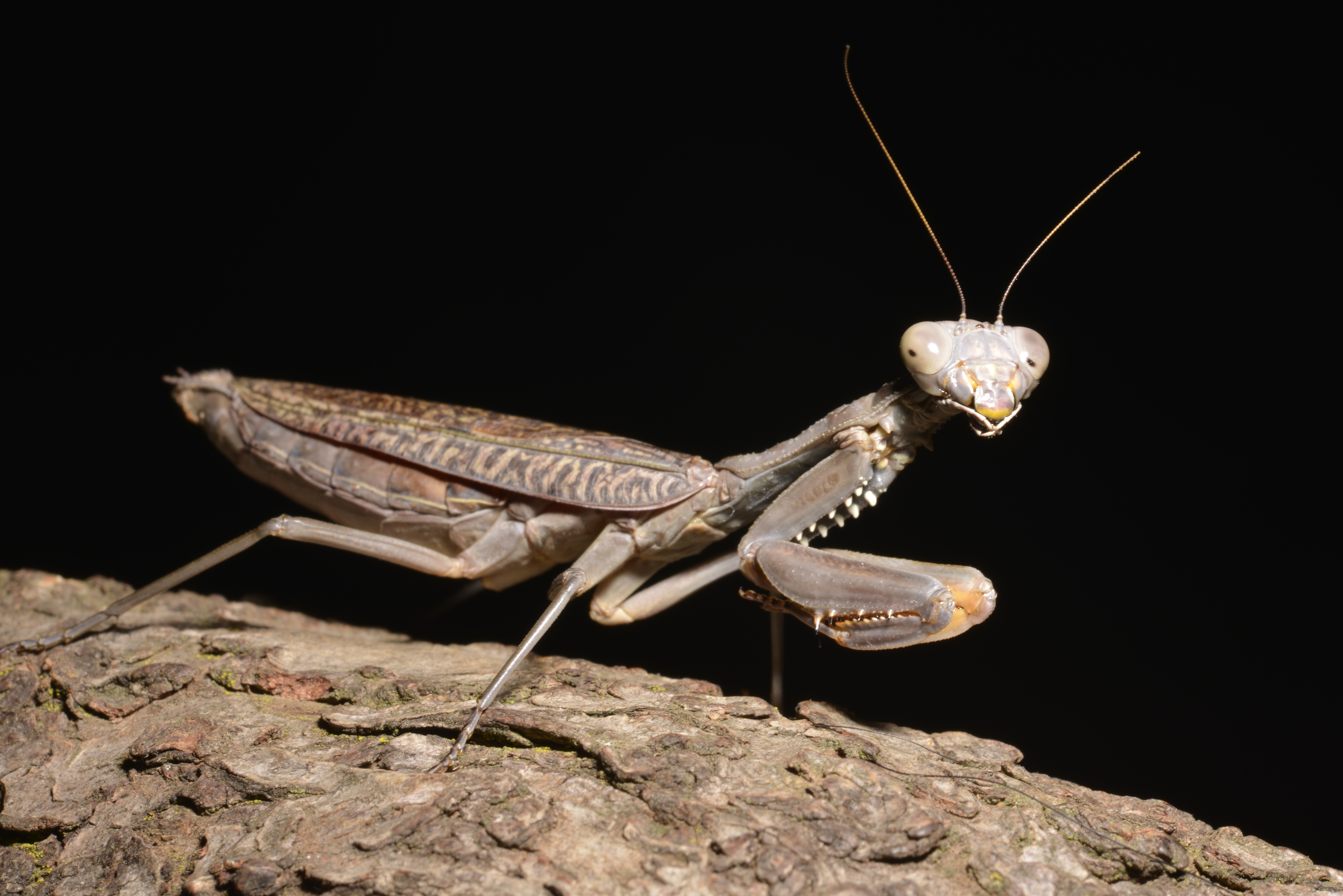
The myrmecomorph of the P. festivus may have an effect on predatory invertebrates such as mantis shrimp in addition to vertebrates.

Ants are even more effectively protected from predators within their colonies. The same may be true for myrmecomorph spiders, including P. festivus, which reside in these colonies. It has been experimentally demonstrated that birds have difficulty distinguishing myrmecomorph spiders from ants using their sense of sight. Similarly, myrmecomorph spiders are also avoided by birds when they are not in the company of ants, or even when they are in the company of non-myrmecomorph spiders, so myrmecomorph spiders with this trait also provide protection in different situations, regardless of whether or not myrmecomorph spiders are present at ant colonies. However, because different predators use different methods to sense prey, it is still unclear how effective myrmecomorphs are in other antagonists of P. festivus.

If a myrmecomorphic spider such as P. festivus is nevertheless attacked by a bird, the bird will not infrequently then eat the spider because of the lack of chemical defense methods. Ants are predominantly avoided by birds due to their formic acid or repelled with it, should they nevertheless try to attack an ant. This contrasts ants with other defensible prey objects or those that otherwise deter predators, which can deter predators from attacking by means of warning colors. In contrast, ants are mostly uniformly blackish, brownish or reddish-brown and thus rather inconspicuously colored. Accordingly, ants can be recognized by potential predators in a visual manner only on the basis of their habitus and the way they move. The ability to recognize ants visually has been demonstrated not only in birds but also in invertebrates, e.g. mantis shrikes avoid ants as prey and butterflies of the genus Eunica do not lay eggs on plants visited by ants. The ants can be recognized visually by their habitus and their movements.

The aforementioned factors suggest that at least birds, as visual hunters and significant predators of spiders, would be significantly responsible for the evolutionary development of myrmecomorphy in spiders such as P. festivus, although the presence of this trait could also have an effect on many other potential predators of spiders. Myrmecomorphism may affect the sense of smell, the sense of taste, or the tactile perception of predators in addition to optical senses. However, more research is needed in this regard.

== Systematics ==
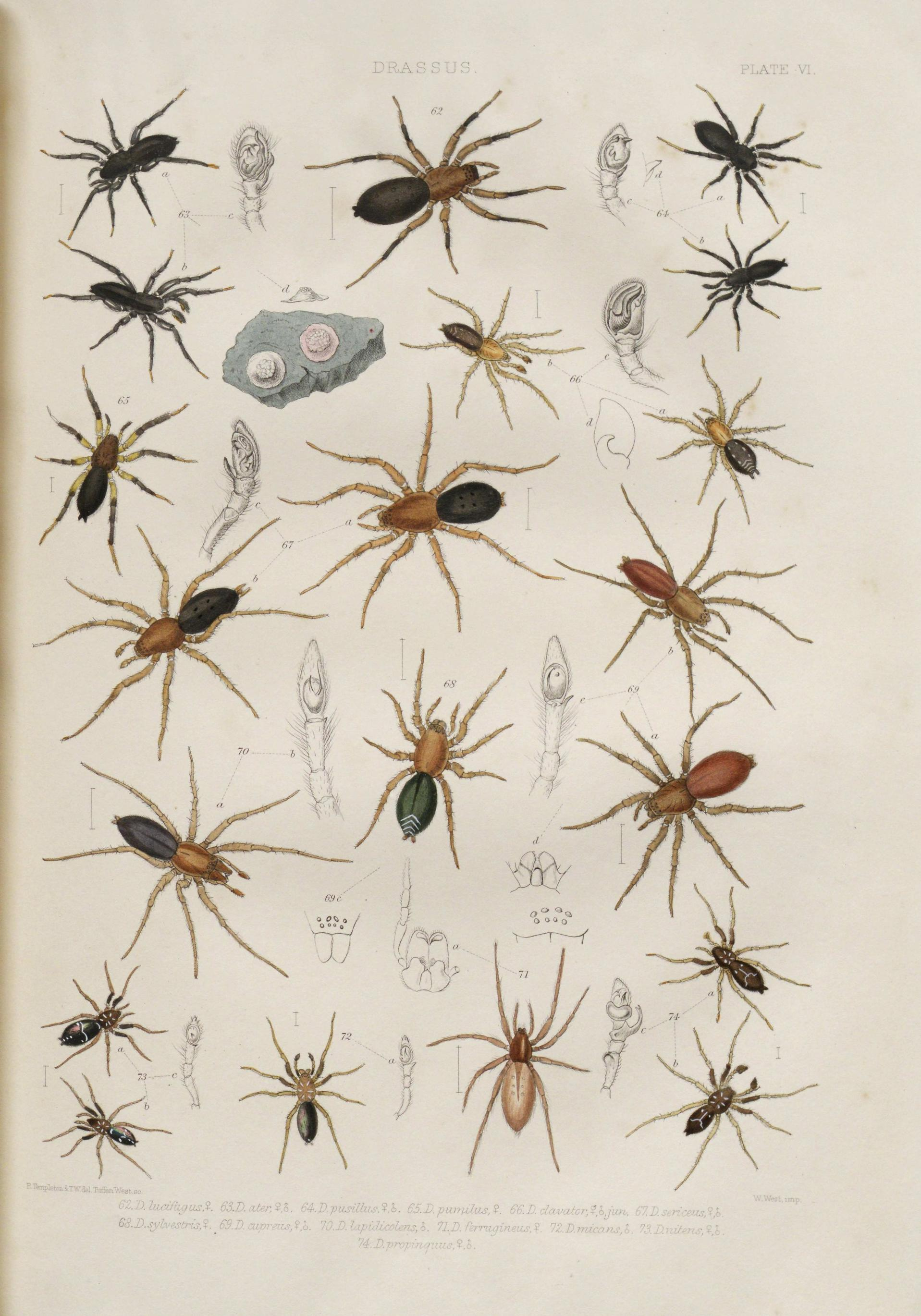
Excerpt from "A History of the Spiders of Great Britain and Ireland" (1861) by John Blackwall, in which P. festivus, here called Drassus propinquus, is also depicted

The systematics of P. festivus underwent increased changes. The species name festivus is an adjective from the Latin language and means "festive" or "cheerful". It points to the spider's contrasting coloration. Phrurolithus festivus is the type species of Phrurolithus.

At its first description in 1835 by Carl Ludwig Koch, it was subdivided by the author of the genus Macaria under the name M. festiva. After that the species received different names from different authors with rearrangements. However, Koch himself subordinated it already four years after his first description to the genus Phrurolithus, which was also first described by him at that time, under the still common name P. festivus. Since a revision of P. festivus and P. minimus carried out in 1968 on the part of Wilhelm Job, Phrurolithus festivus is the consistently applied name.

== Bibliography ==
- Almquist, Sven (2006), Entomology, Scandinavian (ed.), "Swedish Araneae, part 2 – families Dictynidae to Salticidae", Insect Systematics & Evolution, Supplement, vol. 63, no. 1, Interpress, pp. 345–346
- Bee, Lawrence; Oxford, Geoff; Smith, Helen (3 November 2020), Britain's Spiders: A Field Guide – Fully Revised and Updated Second Edition, WILDGuides of Britain & Europe, Princeton University Press, p. 308, ISBN 9780691211800
- Cushing, Paula E. (1997), "Myrmecomorphy and Myrmecophily in Spiders: A Review", Florida Entomologist, vol. 80, no. 2, pp. 165–193, doi:10.2307/3495552, ISSN 1938-5102, JSTOR 3495552
- Roberts, Michael John (1985), The Spiders of Great Britain and Ireland, The Spiders of Great Britain and Ireland, 2, Brill Archive, p. 92
- Pekar, Stano; Jarab, Martin (2011), "Life-history constraints in inaccurate Batesian myrmecomorphic spiders (Araneae: Corinnidae, Gnaphosidae)", European Journal of Entomology, vol. 108, no. 2, pp. 255–260, doi:10.14411/eje.2011.034, ISSN 1802-8829
- Sterghiu, Cleopatra (1985), Akademie der Sozialistischen Republik Rumänien (ed.), "Fam. Clubionidae", Fauna Republicii Socialiste România (Arachnida), vol. 5, no. 4, pp. 149–150
- Veselý, Petr; Dobrovodský, Juraj; Fuchs, Roman (2021), "Predation by avian predators may have initiated the evolution of myrmecomorph spiders", Scientific Reports, vol. 11, no. 1, p. 17266, Bibcode:2021NatSR..1117266V, doi:10.1038/s41598-021-96737-2, ISSN 2045-2322, PMC 8390495, PMID 34446800
