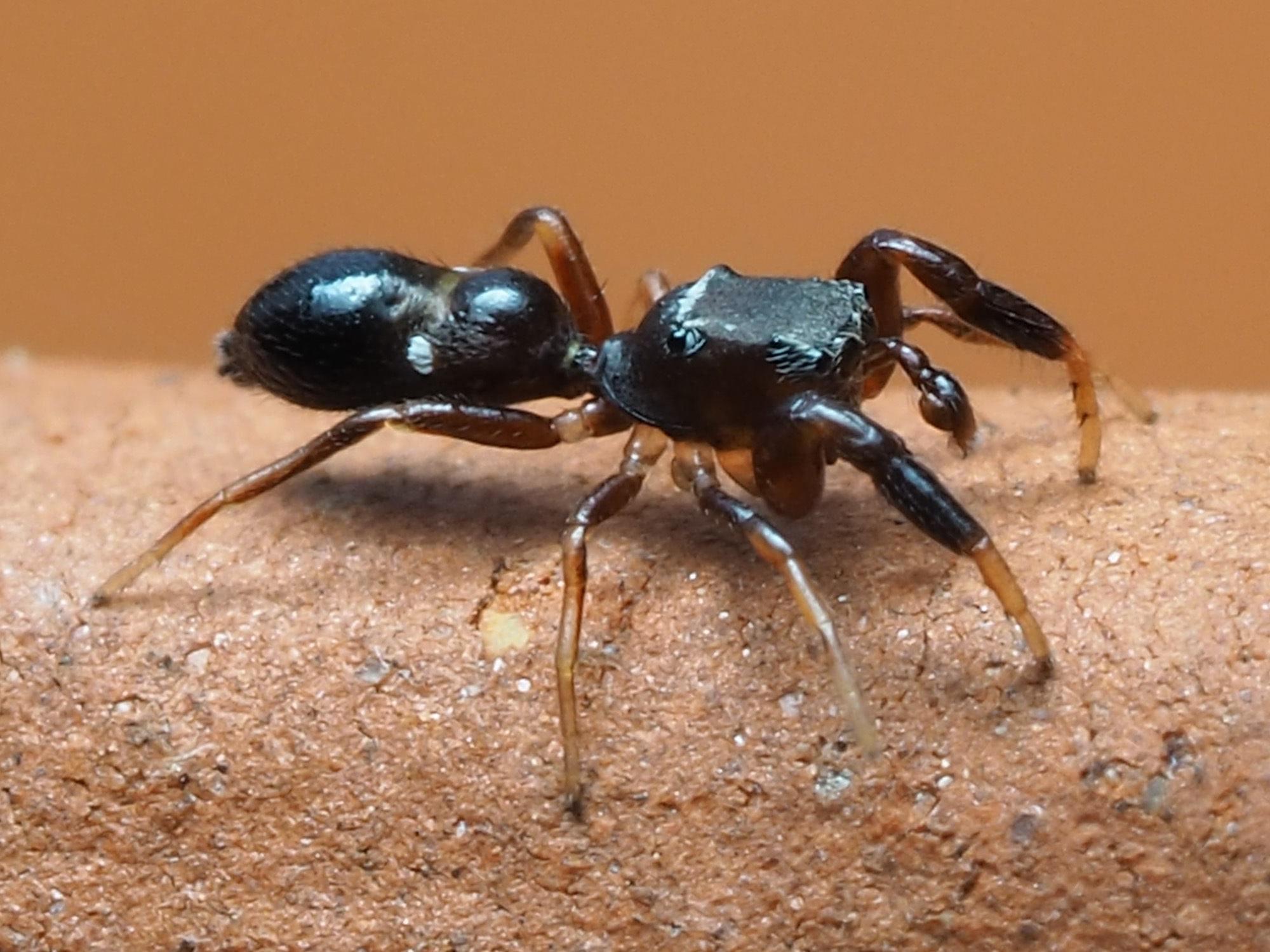
- Male in Pennsylvania

Scientific classification
- Kingdom: Animalia
- Phylum: Arthropoda
- Subphylum: Chelicerata
- Class: Arachnida
- Order: Araneae
- Infraorder: Araneomorphae
- Family: Salticidae
- Genus: Synageles
- Species: S. bishopi

Binomial name
- Synageles bishopi Cutler, 1988

= Synageles bishopi =

Species of spider

Synageles bishopi is a species of jumping spider. It is native to the continental United States.
