= Synageles occidentalis =

Scientific classification
- Kingdom: Animalia
- Phylum: Arthropoda
- Subphylum: Chelicerata
- Class: Arachnida
- Order: Araneae
- Infraorder: Araneomorphae
- Family: Salticidae
- Genus: Synageles
- Species: S. occidentalis

Binomial name
- Synageles occidentalis Cutler, 1988

Species of spider

Synageles occidentalis is a species of jumping spider in the family Salticidae. It is found in the United States and Canada.
