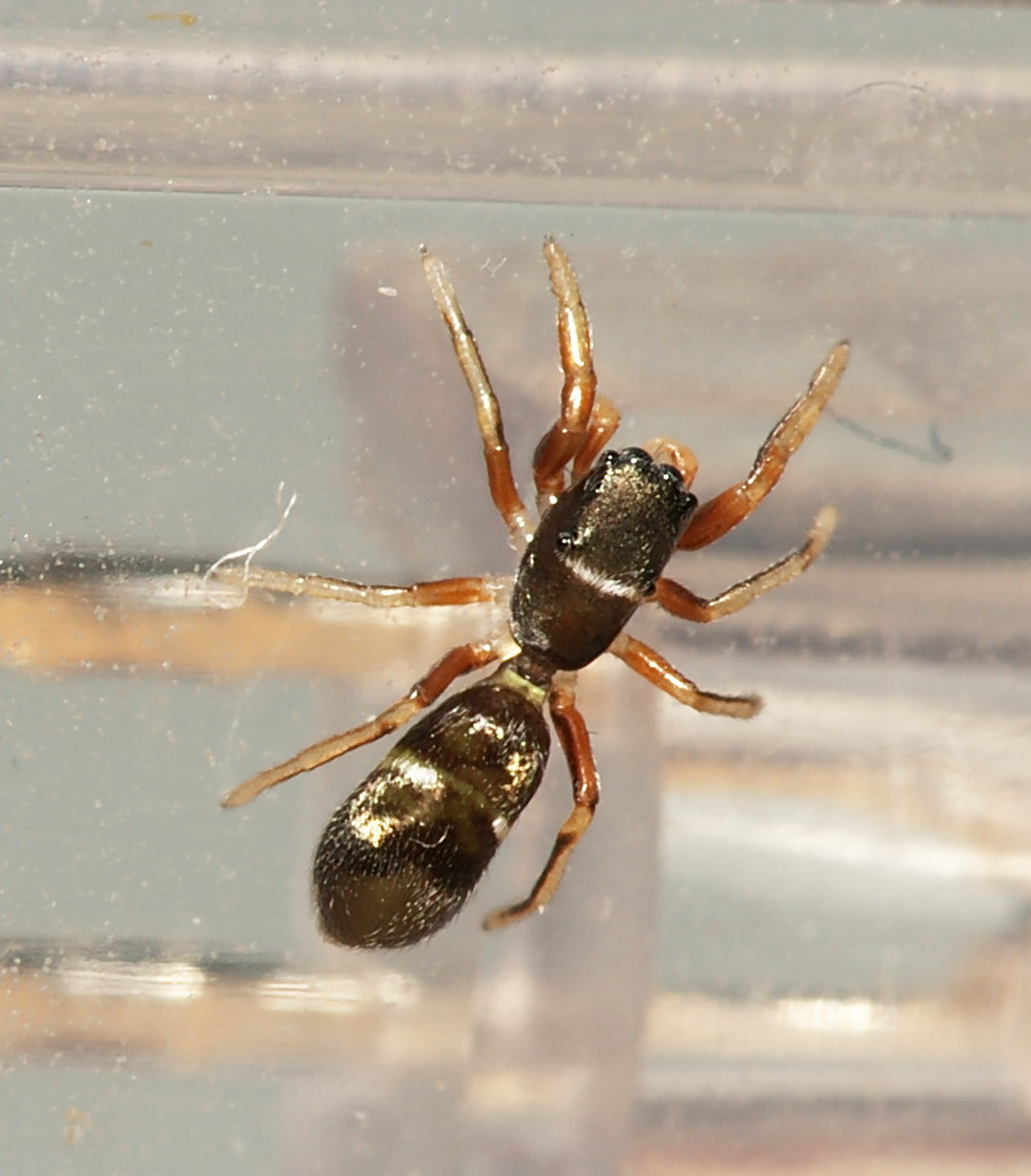

Scientific classification
- Kingdom: Animalia
- Phylum: Arthropoda
- Subphylum: Chelicerata
- Class: Arachnida
- Order: Araneae
- Infraorder: Araneomorphae
- Family: Salticidae
- Genus: Synageles
- Species: S. venator

Binomial name
- Synageles venator (Lucas, 1836)
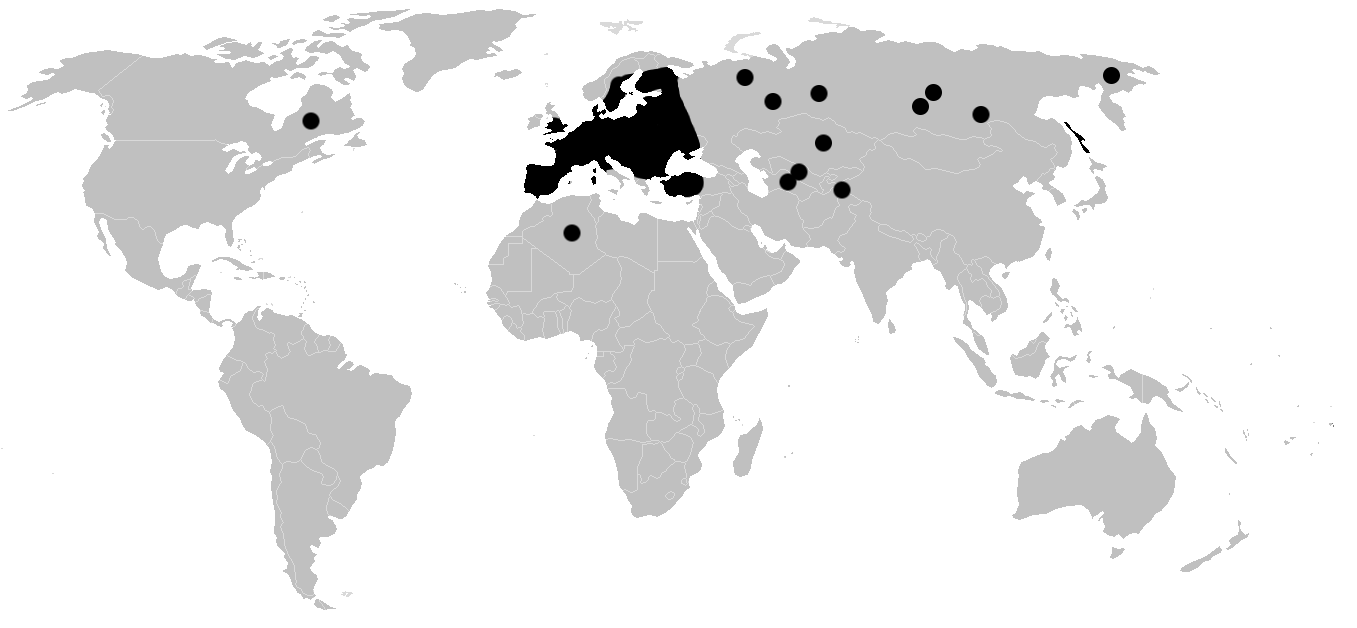

Synonyms
- Attus venator Lucas, 1836; Salticus myrmecoides Rossi, 1846; Leptorchestes venator Leptorchestes ludibundus Simon, 1875; Synageles ludibundus Synageles confusus Kulczynski, 1884

= Synageles venator =

Species of spider

Synageles venator is a species of ant-like jumping spider. It occurs in the Palearctic region as well as North Africa; it has also been found in eastern Canada and British Columbia. In Central Europe it is the most common ant-like jumping spider.

== Description ==
Female are about four millimeters long, males slightly smaller. They are similar to the jumping spider Leptorchestes berolinensis, but feature a white line on the back of their heads.

== Effect of mimicry ==
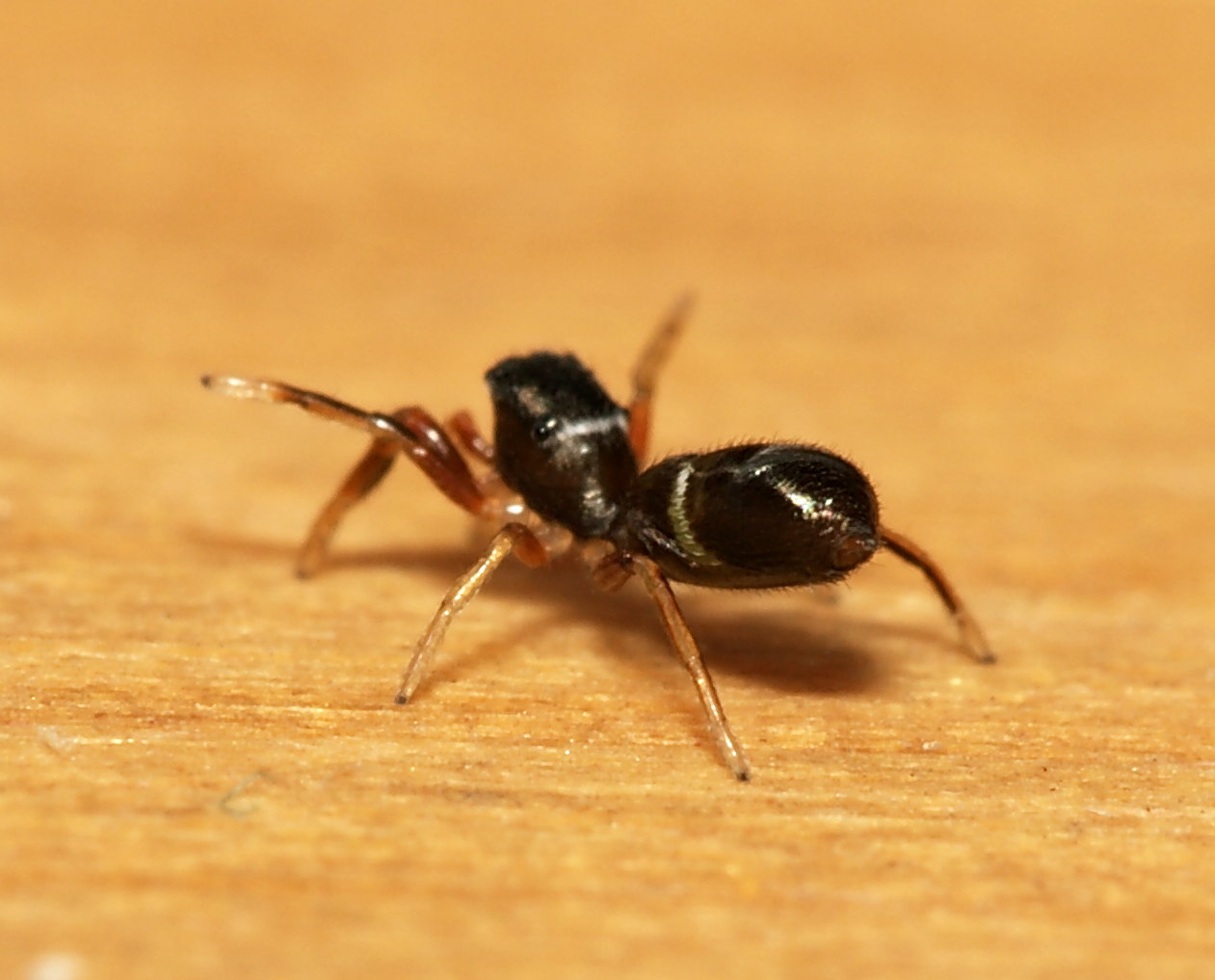
posing S. venator

These spiders are virtually indistinguishable from ants, even for humans looking at them rather closely. They move rapidly like an ant, and even raise their second pair of legs like an ant's antennae. Hand-raised tits that had never come in contact with ants ate spiders of this species readily. However, after their first encounters with real ants, and the nauseating effect of their formic acid, they refrained from eating S. venator.

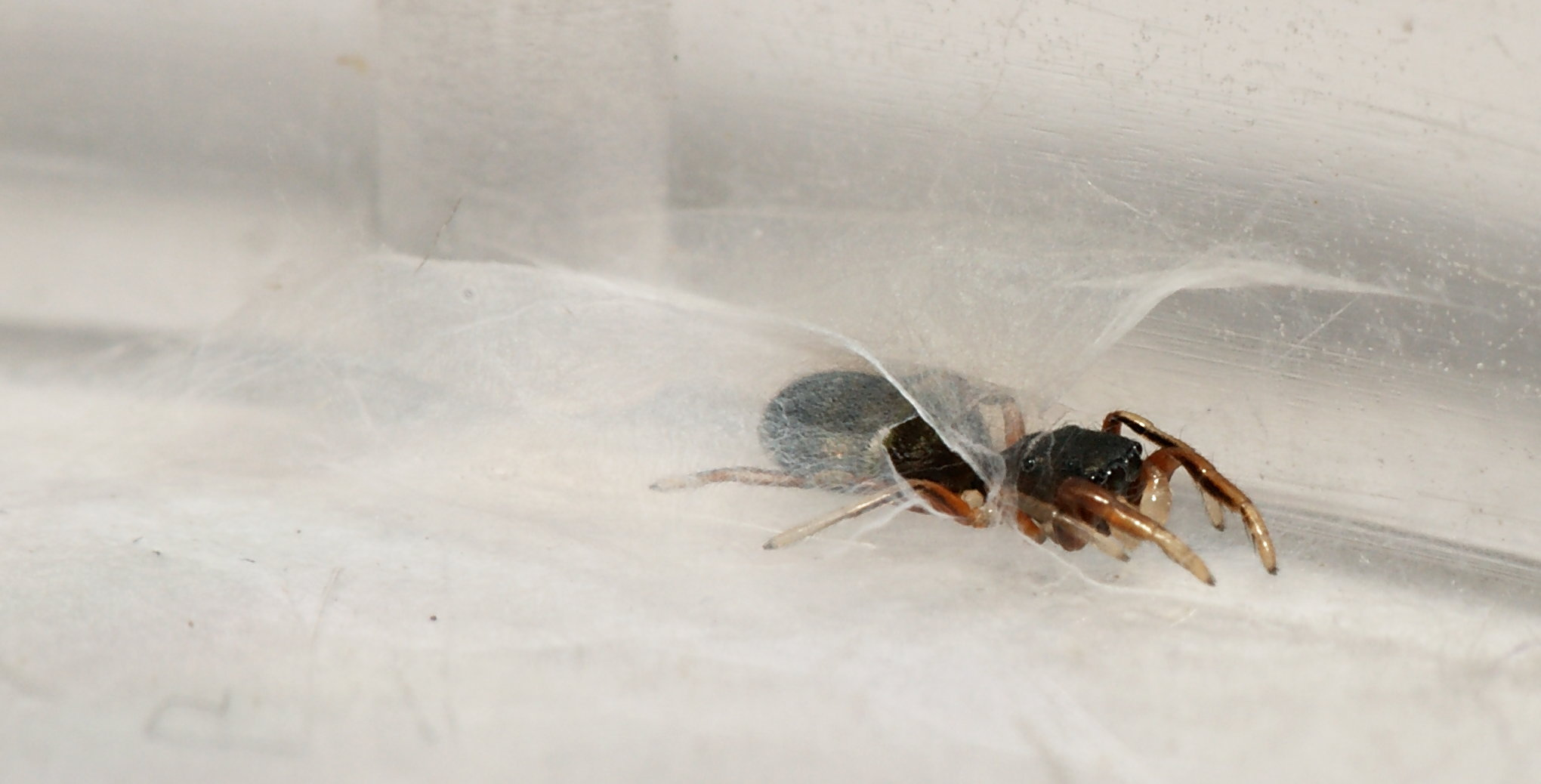
emerging from its silken retreat
