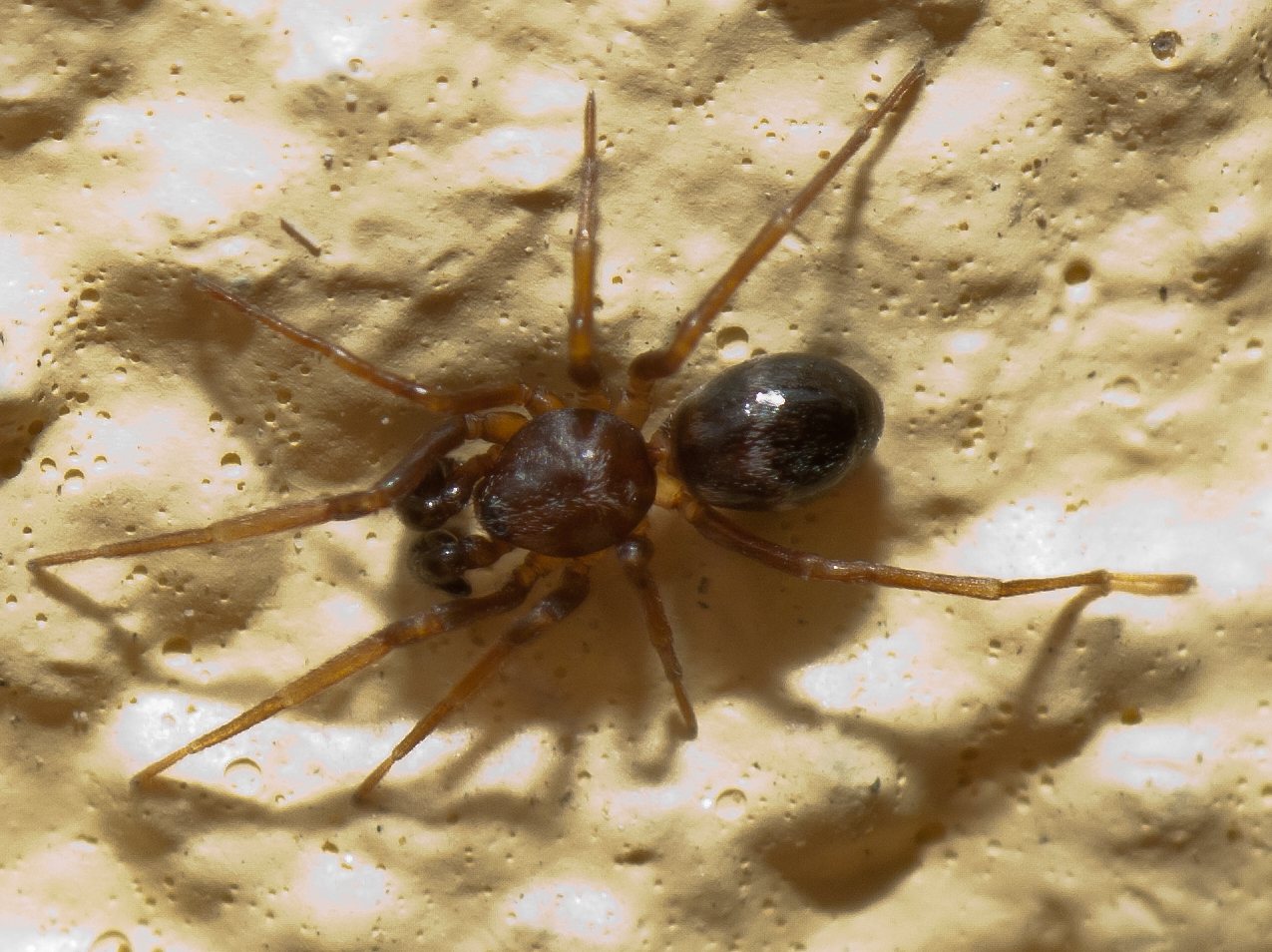
- Phrurolithus sp.

Scientific classification
- Domain: Eukaryota
- Kingdom: Animalia
- Phylum: Arthropoda
- Subphylum: Chelicerata
- Class: Arachnida
- Order: Araneae
- Infraorder: Araneomorphae
- Family: Phrurolithidae
- Genus: Phrurolithus; C. L. Koch, 1839

Type species
- P. festivus (C. L. Koch, 1835)

Species
- 57, see text

= Phrurolithus =

Phrurolithus Temporal range: Palaeogene–present

Genus of spiders

Phrurolithus is a genus of araneomorph spiders first described by C. L. Koch in 1839. First placed with the Liocranidae, it was moved to the Corinnidae in 2002, then to the Phrurolithidae in 2014.

== Species ==
As of December 2021 it contains fifty-seven species:

- P. absurdus Gertsch, 1941 – USA
- P. adjacens Gertsch & Davis, 1940 – Mexico
- P. aemulatus Gertsch, 1941 – USA
- P. alatus Ivie & Barrows, 1935 – USA
- P. apacheus Gertsch, 1941 – USA
- P. apertus Gertsch, 1935 – USA
- P. approximatus Gertsch & Davis, 1940 – Mexico
- P. azarkinae Zamani & Marusik, 2020 – Turkey, Azerbaijan, Iran
- P. banksi Gertsch, 1941 – USA
- P. callidus Gertsch, 1935 – USA
- P. camawhitae Gertsch, 1935 – USA
- P. catalinius Gertsch, 1941 – USA
- P. claripes (Dönitz & Strand, 1906) – China, Russia (Sakhalin), Taiwan, Japan
- P. coahuilanus Gertsch & Davis, 1940 – Mexico
- P. concisus Gertsch, 1941 – USA
- P. connectus Gertsch, 1941 – USA
- P. corsicus (Simon, 1878) – Spain, France (Corsica), Italy (Sardinia) to Romania
- P. debilis Gertsch & Davis, 1940 – Mexico
- P. diversus Gertsch & Davis, 1940 – Mexico
- P. dolius Chamberlin & Ivie, 1935 – USA
- P. duncani (Chamberlin, 1925) – USA
- P. emertoni Gertsch, 1935 – USA
- P. festivus (C. L. Koch, 1835) (type) – Europe, Turkey, Caucasus, Russia (Europe to Far East), Kazakhstan, Iran, China, Korea, Japan. Introduced to Canada
- P. flavipes O. Pickard-Cambridge, 1872 – Lebanon, Israel
- P. florentinus Caporiacco, 1923 – Italy
- P. goodnighti Muma, 1945 – USA
- P. hamdeokensis Seo, 1988 – Russia (South Siberia, Far East), Korea
- P. kastoni Schenkel, 1950 – USA
- P. kentuckyensis Chamberlin & Gertsch, 1930 – USA
- P. labialis Paik, 1991 – Korea, Japan
- P. lasiolepis Fu, Chen & Zhang, 2016 – China
- P. leviculus Gertsch, 1936 – USA
- P. lindemanni Marusik, Omelko & Koponen, 2020 – Russia (Far East)
- P. luppovae Spassky, 1941 – Tajikistan
- P. minimus C. L. Koch, 1839 – Europe
- P. nemoralis Bryant, 1940 – Cuba
- P. nigrinus (Simon, 1878) – Central and southern Europe
- P. nipponicus Kishida, 1914 – Japan
- P. oabus Chamberlin & Ivie, 1935 – USA
- P. paludivagus Bishop & Crosby, 1926 – USA
- P. parcus (Hentz, 1847) – USA
- P. pennatoides Seo, 2018 – Korea
- P. pinturus Ivie & Barrows, 1935 – USA
- P. pipensis Muma, 1945 – USA
- P. pullatus Kulczyński, 1897 – Central to Eastern Europe, Turkey, Caucasus, Iran, Kazakhstan, Central Asia
- P. pygmaeus Thorell, 1875 – Ukraine, Russia (Europe)
- P. schwarzi Gertsch, 1941 – USA
- P. shimenensis Yin, Peng, Gong & Kim, 1997 – China
- P. similis Banks, 1895 – USA
- P. singulus Gertsch, 1941 – USA
- P. sinicus Zhu & Mei, 1982 – Russia (South Siberia, Far East), China, Korea, Japan
- P. sordidus Savelyeva, 1972 – Kazakhstan
- P. spinosus Bryant, 1948 – Hispaniola
- P. szilyi Herman, 1879 – Portugal, Spain, Central to south-eastern Europe
- P. tamaulipanus Gertsch & Davis, 1940 – Mexico
- P. tepejicanus Gertsch & Davis, 1940 – Mexico
- P. thracia Komnenov & Chatzaki, 2016 – Greece, Turkey
