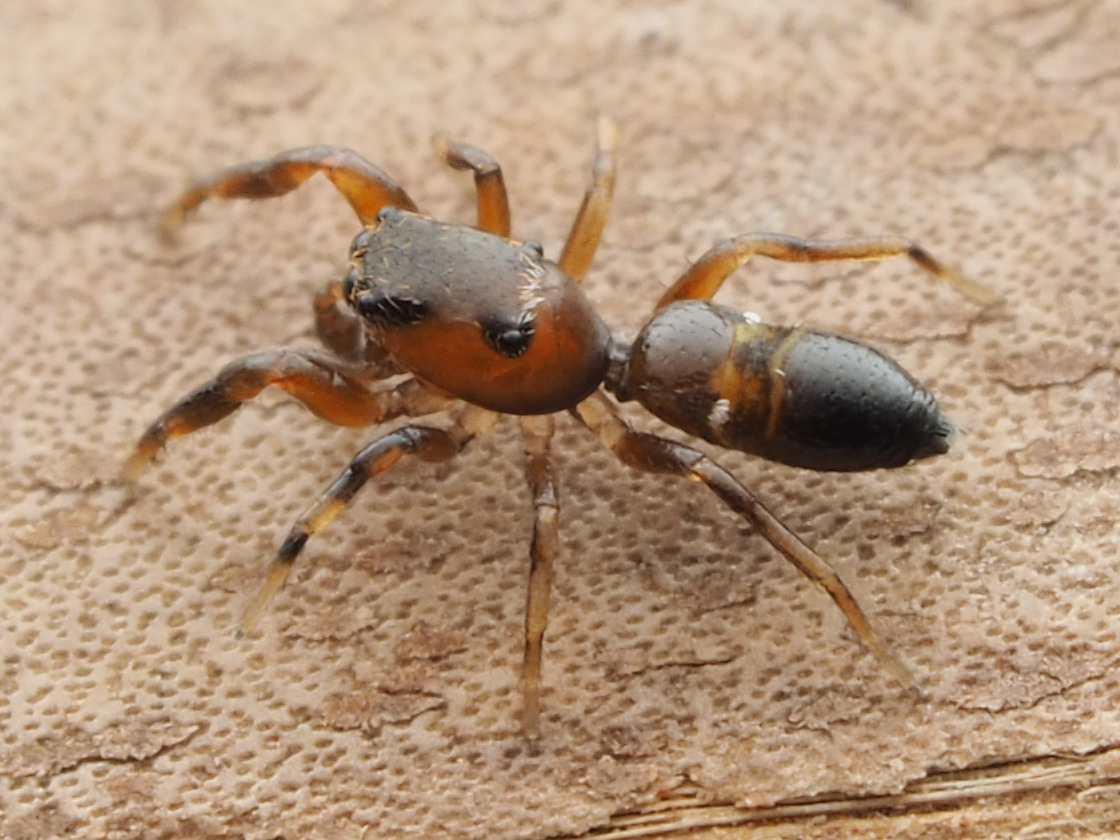
- Male in New Jersey

Scientific classification
- Kingdom: Animalia
- Phylum: Arthropoda
- Subphylum: Chelicerata
- Class: Arachnida
- Order: Araneae
- Infraorder: Araneomorphae
- Family: Salticidae
- Genus: Synageles
- Species: S. noxiosus

Binomial name
- Synageles noxiosus (Hentz, 1850)

= Synageles noxiosus =

Species of spider

Synageles noxiosus is a species of jumping spider. It is found in Canada, the United States, Mexico, and the Bahamas.
