= Phrurolithus pipensis =

Scientific classification
- Domain: Eukaryota
- Kingdom: Animalia
- Phylum: Arthropoda
- Subphylum: Chelicerata
- Class: Arachnida
- Order: Araneae
- Infraorder: Araneomorphae
- Family: Phrurolithidae
- Genus: Phrurolithus
- Species: P. pipensis

Binomial name
- Phrurolithus pipensis Muma, 1945

Species of spider

Phrurolithus pipensis is a species of true spider in the family Phrurolithidae. It is found in the United States.
