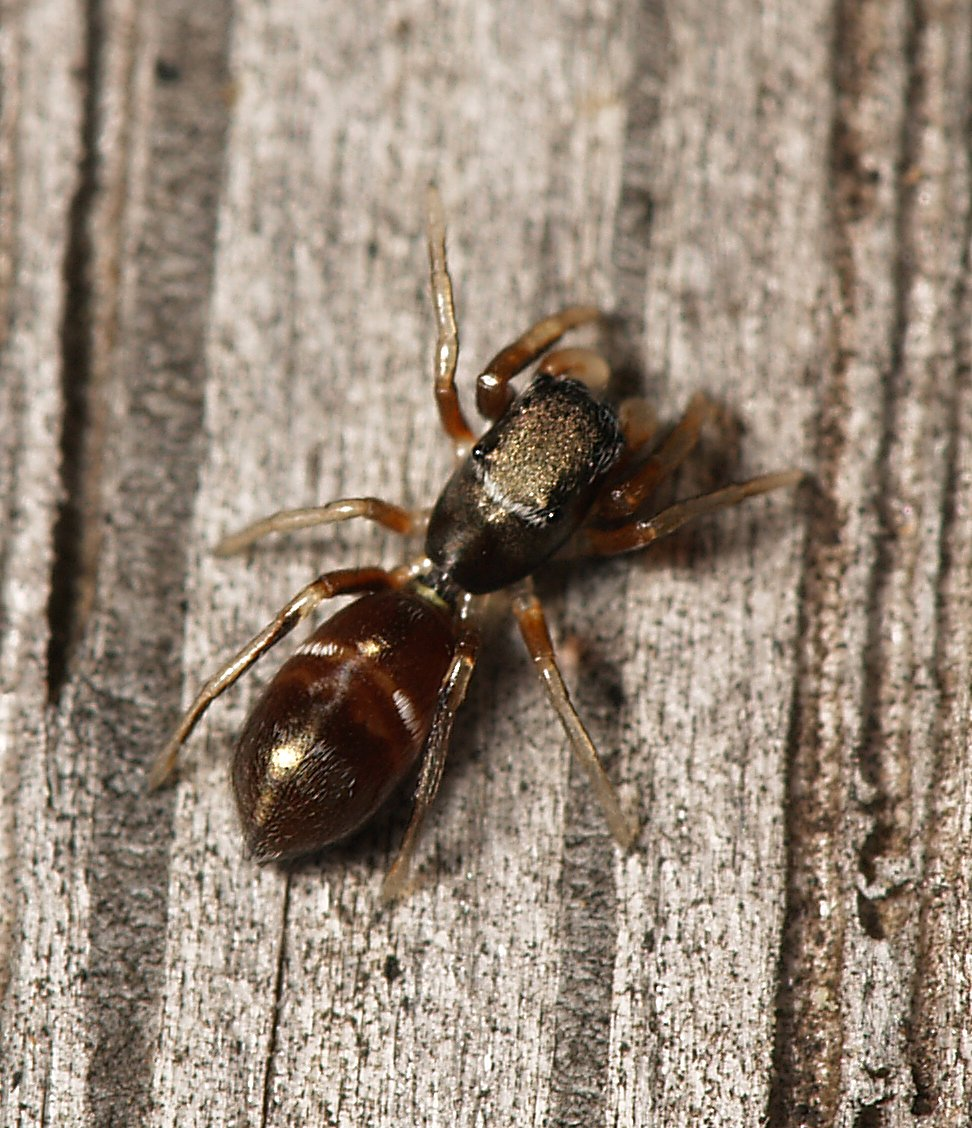
- Synageles venator

Scientific classification
- Kingdom: Animalia
- Phylum: Arthropoda
- Subphylum: Chelicerata
- Class: Arachnida
- Order: Araneae
- Infraorder: Araneomorphae
- Family: Salticidae
- Subfamily: Salticinae
- Genus: Synageles; Simon, 1876

Type species
- S. venator (Lucas, 1836)

Species
- 19, see text

Synonyms
- Gertschia Kaston, 1945

= Synageles =

Genus of spiders

Synageles is a genus of jumping spiders that was first described by Eugène Louis Simon in 1876.

== Species ==
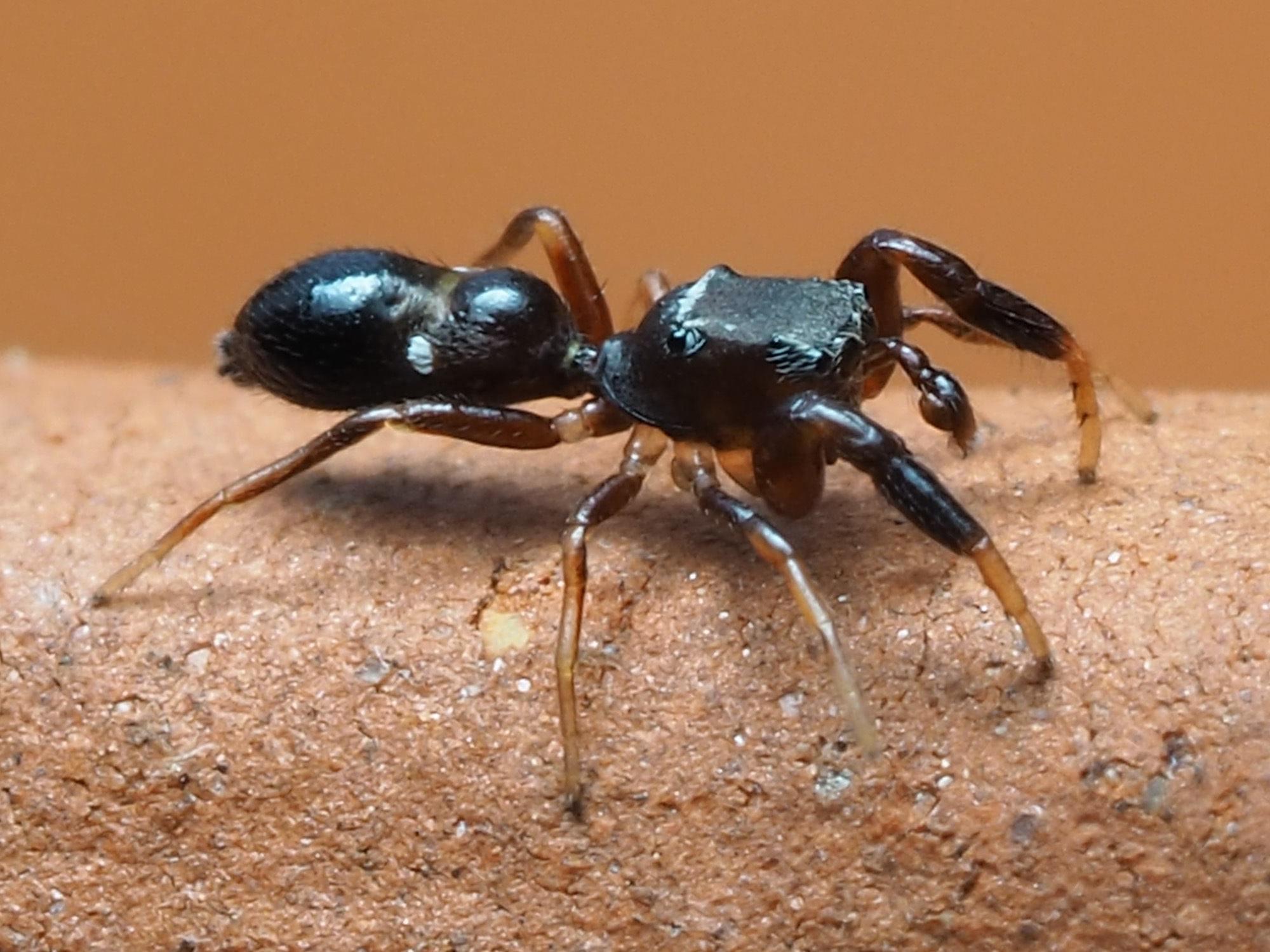
S. bishopi

S. hilarulus

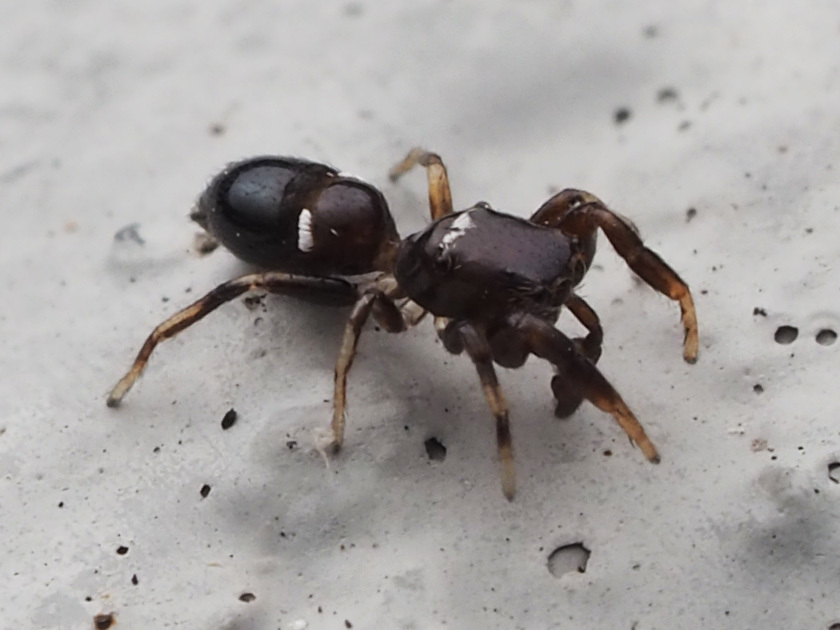
S. noxiosus

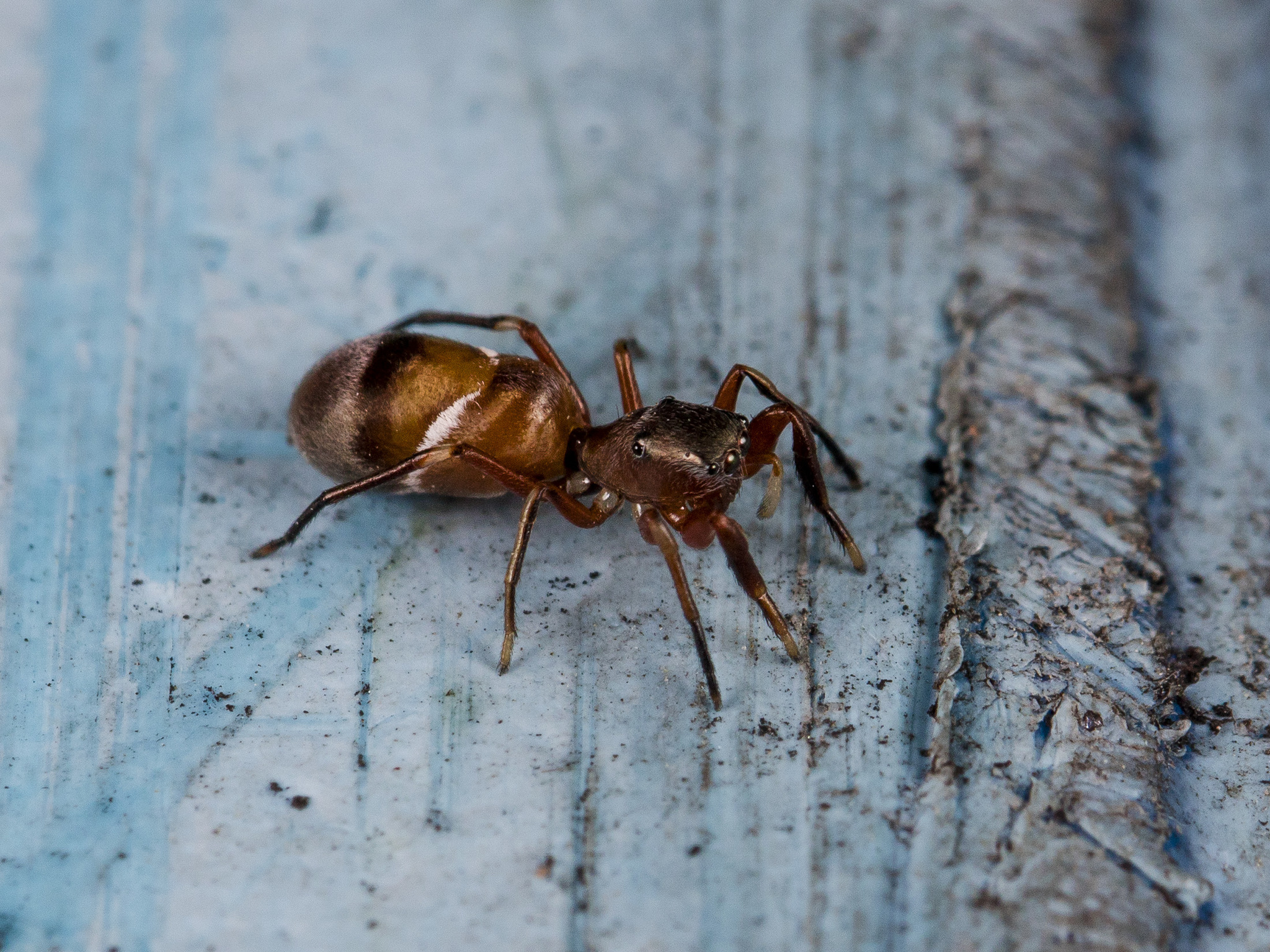
S. subcingulatus

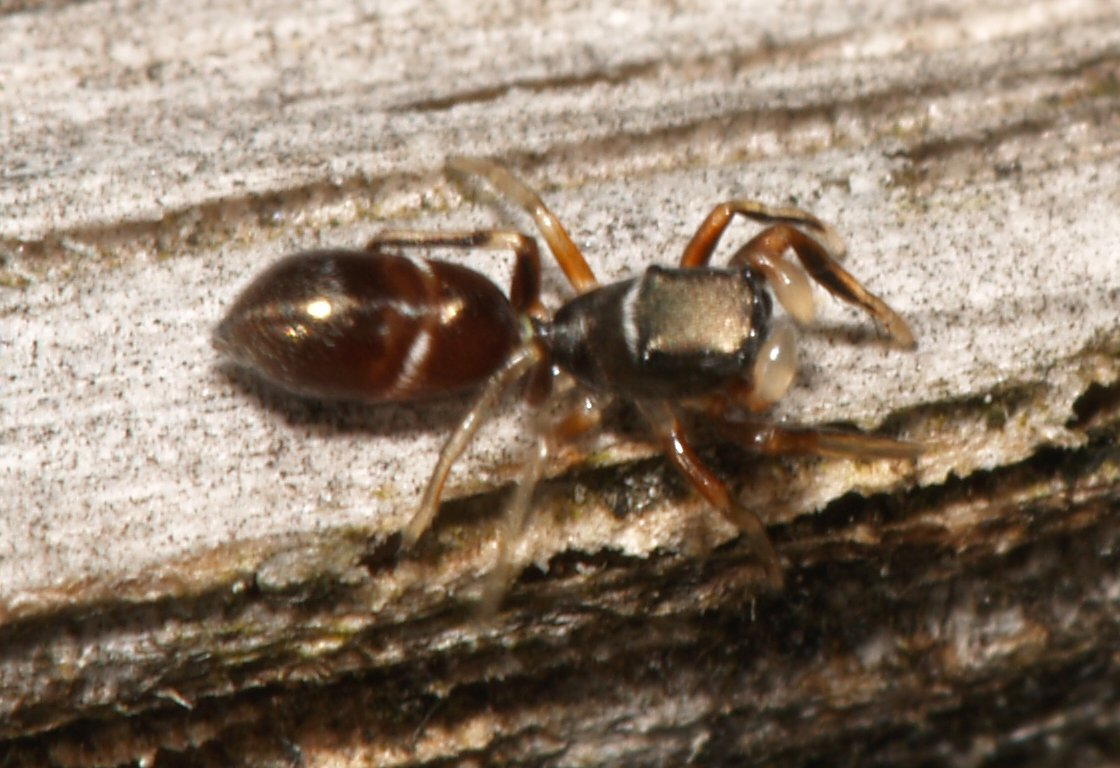
S. venator

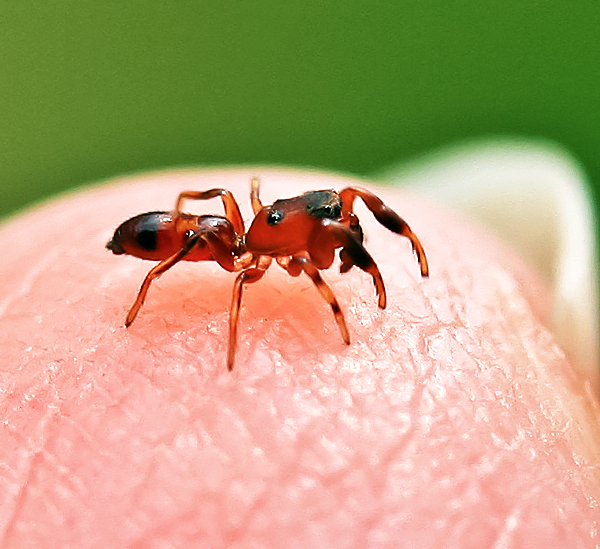
Synageles sp.

As of August 2019 it contains nineteen species, found in the Old World from Spain to China, with one found in northern Africa (S. repudiatus from Egypt), and in the New World from Mexico to Canada, and the Bahamas:

- Synageles albotrimaculatus (Lucas, 1846) – Spain, France, Italy, Algeria, Tunisia, Turkey
- Synageles bishopi Cutler, 1988 – USA
- Synageles canadensis Cutler, 1988 – USA, Canada
- Synageles charitonovi Andreeva, 1976 – Kazakhstan, Central Asia
- Synageles dalmaticus (Keyserling, 1863) – Mediterranean, Bulgaria, Romania, Ukraine, Caucasus (Russia, Azerbaijan)
- Synageles hilarulus (C. L. Koch, 1846) – Europe, Turkey, Russia (Europe to Far East), Kazakhstan, Central Asia, Korea, Japan
- Synageles idahoanus (Gertsch, 1934) – USA
- Synageles leechi Cutler, 1988 – Canada
- Synageles mexicanus Cutler, 1988 – USA, Mexico
- Synageles morsei Logunov & Marusik, 1999 – Russia (Far East)
- Synageles nigriculus Danilov, 1997 – Russia (South Siberia, Far East)
- Synageles noxiosus (Hentz, 1850) – North America, Bahama Is.
- Synageles occidentalis Cutler, 1988 – USA, Canada
- Synageles persianus Logunov, 2004 – Armenia, Azerbaijan, Iran
- Synageles ramitus Andreeva, 1976 – Ukraine, Russia (Europe to South Siberia), Kazakhstan, Central Asia, Mongolia, China
- Synageles repudiatus (O. Pickard-Cambridge, 1876) – Egypt
- Synageles scutiger Prószyński, 1979 – Greece, Ukraine, Azerbaijan
- Synageles subcingulatus (Simon, 1878) – Central Europe, Ukraine, Russia (Europe, West Siberia), Turkey, Azerbaijan, Kazakhstan, Central Asia
- Synageles venator (Lucas, 1836) (type) – Europe, Turkey, Caucasus, Russia (Europe to Far East), Kazakhstan, Central Asia, China, Japan. Introduced to Canada
