= List of Phrurolithidae species =

This page lists all described genera and species of the spider family Phrurolithidae. As of April 2019, the World Spider Catalog accepts 219 species in 13 genera:

== A ==
=== Abdosetae ===
Abdosetae Fu, Zhang & MacDermott, 2010

- Abdosetae digitata Jin, Fu & Zhang, 2015 — China
- Abdosetae falcata Jin, Fu & Zhang, 2015 — China
- Abdosetae hainan Fu, Zhang & MacDermott, 2010 (type) — China
- Abdosetae hamata Jin, Fu & Zhang, 2015 — China
- Abdosetae ornata (Deeleman-Reinhold, 2001) — Borneo

== D ==
=== Dorymetaecus ===
Dorymetaecus Rainbow, 1920

- Dorymetaecus spinnipes Rainbow, 1920 (type) — Australia (Lord Howe Is.)

=== Drassinella ===
Drassinella Banks, 1904

- Drassinella gertschi Platnick & Ubick, 1989 — USA, Mexico
- Drassinella modesta Banks, 1904 (type) — USA
- Drassinella schulzefenai (Chamberlin & Ivie, 1936) — Mexico
- Drassinella sclerata (Chamberlin & Ivie, 1935) — USA
- Drassinella siskiyou Platnick & Ubick, 1989 — USA
- Drassinella sonoma Platnick & Ubick, 1989 — USA
- Drassinella unicolor (Chamberlin & Ivie, 1935) — USA

== L ==
=== Liophrurillus ===
Liophrurillus

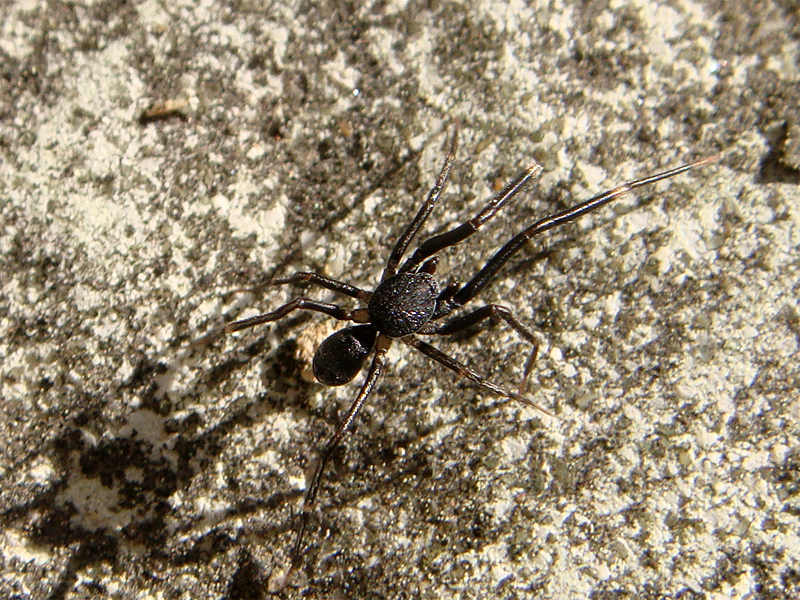
Liophrurillus flavitarsis

Liophrurillus Wunderlich, 1992

- Liophrurillus flavitarsis (Lucas, 1846) (type) — Europe, Madeira, North Africa

== O ==
=== Otacilia ===
Otacilia

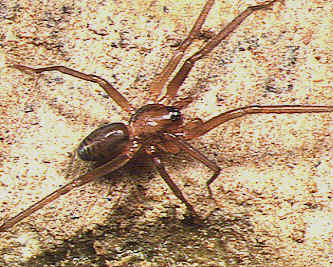
Phrurolithus lynx, male

Otacilia Thorell, 1897

- Otacilia acuta Fu, Zhang & Zhang, 2016 — China
- Otacilia ailan Liu, Xu, Xiao, Yin & Peng, 2019 — China
- Otacilia ambon Deeleman-Reinhold, 2001 — Indonesia (Moluccas)
- Otacilia armatissima Thorell, 1897 (type) — Myanmar
- Otacilia aurita Fu, Zhang & Zhang, 2016 — China
- Otacilia bawangling Fu, Zhang & Zhu, 2010 — China
- Otacilia biarclata Fu, He & Zhang, 2015 — China
- Otacilia bicolor Jäger & Wunderlich, 2012 — Laos
- Otacilia bifurcata Dankittipakul & Singtripop, 2014 — Thailand
- Otacilia christae Jäger & Wunderlich, 2012 — Laos
- Otacilia curvata Jin, Fu, Yin & Zhang, 2016 — China
- Otacilia daweishan Liu, Xu, Xiao, Yin & Peng, 2019 — China
- Otacilia digitata Fu, Zhang & Zhang, 2016 — China
- Otacilia fabiformis Liu, Xu, Xiao, Yin & Peng, 2019 — China
- Otacilia flexa Fu, Zhang & Zhang, 2016 — China
- Otacilia florifera Fu, He & Zhang, 2015 — China
- Otacilia forcipata Yang, Wang & Yang, 2013 — China
- Otacilia foveata (Song, 1990) — China
- Otacilia fujiana Fu, Jin & Zhang, 2014 — China
- Otacilia hengshan (Song, 1990) — China
- Otacilia hippocampa Jin, Fu, Yin & Zhang, 2016 — China
- Otacilia jiandao Liu, Xu, Xiao, Yin & Peng, 2019 — China
- Otacilia jianfengling Fu, Zhang & Zhu, 2010 — China
- Otacilia kamurai Ono & Ogata, 2018 — Japan
- Otacilia kao Jäger & Wunderlich, 2012 — Thailand, Vietnam
- Otacilia komurai (Yaginuma, 1952) — China, Korea, Japan
- Otacilia leibo Fu, Zhang & Zhang, 2016 — China
- Otacilia limushan Fu, Zhang & Zhu, 2010 — China
- Otacilia liupan Hu & Zhang, 2011 — China
- Otacilia longituba Wang, Zhang & Zhang, 2012 — China
- Otacilia loriot Jäger & Wunderlich, 2012 — Laos
- Otacilia luna (Kamura, 1994) — Japan
- Otacilia luzonica (Simon, 1898) — Philippines
- Otacilia lynx (Kamura, 1994) — Taiwan, Japan
- Otacilia microstoma Wang, Chen, Zhou, Zhang & Zhang, 2015 — China
- Otacilia mingsheng Yang, Wang & Yang, 2013 — China
- Otacilia mira Fu, Zhang & Zhang, 2016 — China
- Otacilia mustela Kamura, 2008 — Japan
- Otacilia namkhan Jäger & Wunderlich, 2012 — Laos
- Otacilia nonggang Liu, Xu, Xiao, Yin & Peng, 2019 — China
- Otacilia onoi Deeleman-Reinhold, 2001 — Thailand
- Otacilia ovata Fu, Zhang & Zhang, 2016 — China
- Otacilia papilion Fu, Zhang & Zhang, 2016 — China
- Otacilia papilla Dankittipakul & Singtripop, 2014 — Indonesia (Sumatra)
- Otacilia paracymbium Jäger & Wunderlich, 2012 — China
- Otacilia parva Deeleman-Reinhold, 2001 — Indonesia (Sumatra)
- Otacilia pseudostella Fu, Jin & Zhang, 2014 — China
- Otacilia pyriformis Fu, Zhang & Zhang, 2016 — China
- Otacilia revoluta (Yin, Ubick, Bao & Xu, 2004) — China
- Otacilia simianshan Zhou, Wang & Zhang, 2013 — China
- Otacilia sinifera Deeleman-Reinhold, 2001 — Thailand
- Otacilia songi Wang, Chen, Zhou, Zhang & Zhang, 2015 — China
- Otacilia stella Kamura, 2005 — Japan
- Otacilia subliupan Wang, Chen, Zhou, Zhang & Zhang, 2015 — China
- Otacilia submicrostoma Jin, Fu, Yin & Zhang, 2016 — China
- Otacilia taiwanica (Hayashi & Yoshida, 1993) — China, Taiwan, Japan
- Otacilia truncata Dankittipakul & Singtripop, 2014 — Thailand
- Otacilia vangvieng Jäger & Wunderlich, 2012 — Laos
- Otacilia vulpes (Kamura, 2001) — Japan
- Otacilia yangi Zhang, Fu & Zhu, 2009 — China
- Otacilia yangmingensis Jin, Fu, Yin & Zhang, 2016 — China
- Otacilia yinae Liu, Xu, Xiao, Yin & Peng, 2019 — China
- Otacilia zebra Deeleman-Reinhold, 2001 — Thailand
- Otacilia zhangi Fu, Jin & Zhang, 2014 — China

== P ==
=== Phonotimpus ===
Phonotimpus Gertsch & Davis, 1940

- Phonotimpus eutypus Gertsch & Davis, 1940 — Mexico
- Phonotimpus marialuisae Chamé-Vázquez & Ibarra-Núñez, 2019 — Mexico
- Phonotimpus pennimani Chamé-Vázquez, Ibarra-Núñez & Jiménez, 2018 — Mexico
- Phonotimpus separatus Gertsch & Davis, 1940 (type) — Mexico
- Phonotimpus talquian Chamé-Vázquez, Ibarra-Núñez & Jiménez, 2018 — Mexico

=== Phrurolinillus ===
Phrurolinillus Wunderlich, 1995

- Phrurolinillus lisboensis Wunderlich, 1995 — Portugal
- Phrurolinillus tibialis (Simon, 1878) (type) — Spain

=== Phrurolithus ===
Phrurolithus

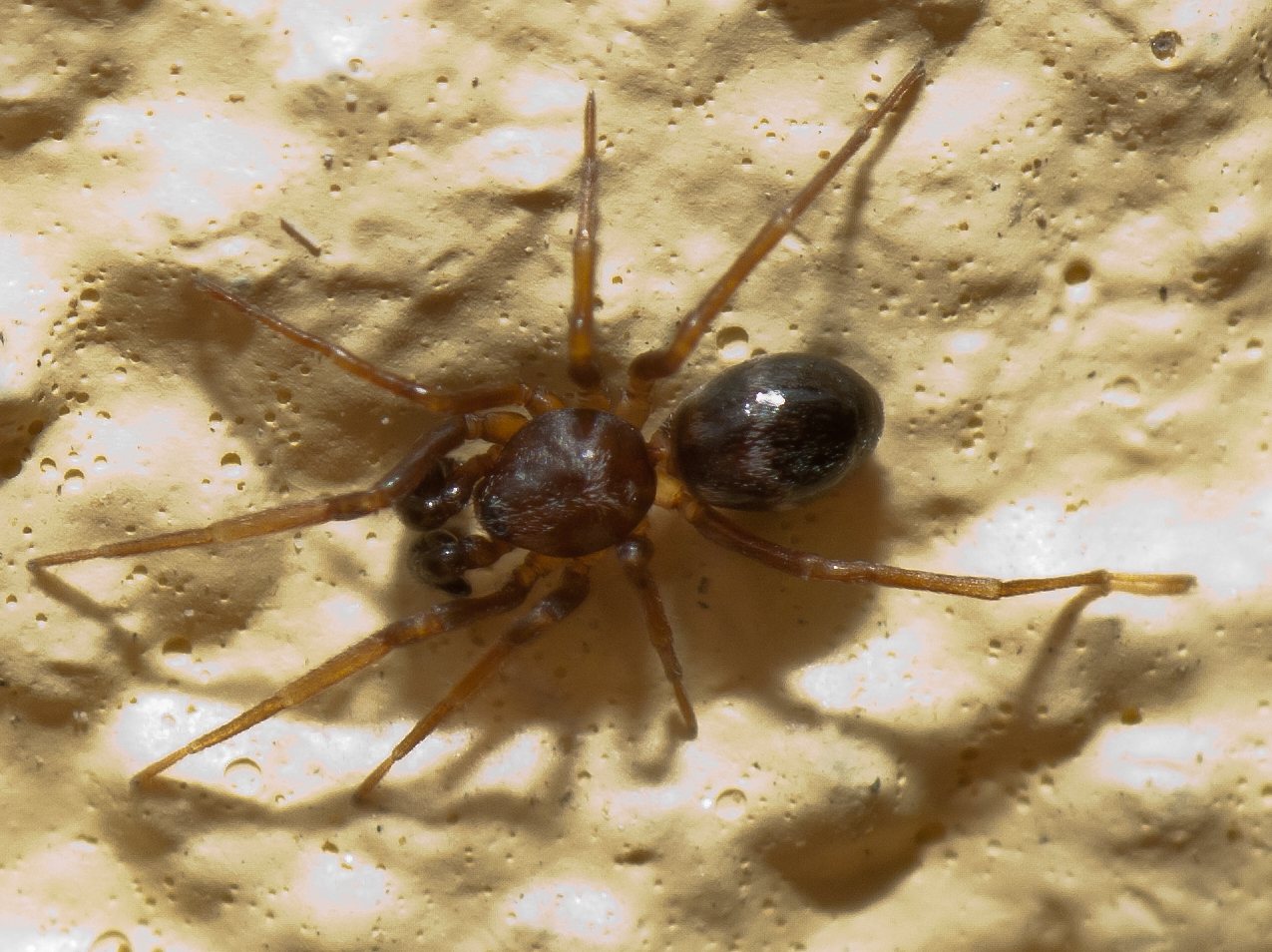
Phrurolithus sp.

Phrurolithus C. L. Koch, 1839

- Phrurolithus absurdus Gertsch, 1941 — USA
- Phrurolithus adjacens Gertsch & Davis, 1940 — Mexico
- Phrurolithus aemulatus Gertsch, 1941 — USA
- Phrurolithus alatus Ivie & Barrows, 1935 — USA
- Phrurolithus annulus Zhou, Wang & Zhang, 2013 — China
- Phrurolithus anticus Wang, Chen, Zhou, Zhang & Zhang, 2015 — China
- Phrurolithus apacheus Gertsch, 1941 — USA
- Phrurolithus apertus Gertsch, 1935 — USA
- Phrurolithus approximatus Gertsch & Davis, 1940 — Mexico
- Phrurolithus banksi Gertsch, 1941 — USA
- Phrurolithus bifidus Yin, Ubick, Bao & Xu, 2004 — China
- Phrurolithus callidus Gertsch, 1935 — USA
- Phrurolithus camawhitae Gertsch, 1935 — USA
- Phrurolithus cangshan Yang, Fu, Zhang & Zhang, 2010 — China
- Phrurolithus catalinius Gertsch, 1941 — USA
- Phrurolithus celatus Fu, Chen & Zhang, 2016 — China
- Phrurolithus claripes (Dönitz & Strand, 1906) — China, Russia (Sakhalin), Taiwan, Japan
- Phrurolithus coahuilanus Gertsch & Davis, 1940 — Mexico
- Phrurolithus concisus Gertsch, 1941 — USA
- Phrurolithus connectus Gertsch, 1941 — USA
- Phrurolithus coreanus Paik, 1991 — Korea, Russia (Kurile Is.), Japan
- Phrurolithus corsicus (Simon, 1878) — Spain, France (Corsica), Italy (Sardinia) to Romania
- Phrurolithus daoxianensis Yin, Peng, Gong & Kim, 1997 — China
- Phrurolithus debilis Gertsch & Davis, 1940 — Mexico
- Phrurolithus dianchiensis Yin, Peng, Gong & Kim, 1997 — China
- Phrurolithus diversus Gertsch & Davis, 1940 — Mexico
- Phrurolithus dolius Chamberlin & Ivie, 1935 — USA
- Phrurolithus duncani (Chamberlin, 1925) — USA
- Phrurolithus emertoni Gertsch, 1935 — USA
- Phrurolithus fanjingshan Wang, Chen, Zhou, Zhang & Zhang, 2015 — China
- Phrurolithus faustus Paik, 1991 — Korea
- Phrurolithus festivus (C. L. Koch, 1835) (type) — Europe, Turkey, Caucasus, Russia (Europe to Far East), Kazakhstan, China, Korea, Japan
- Phrurolithus flavipes O. Pickard-Cambridge, 1872 — Lebanon, Israel
- Phrurolithus florentinus Caporiacco, 1923 — Italy
- Phrurolithus goodnighti Muma, 1945 — USA
- Phrurolithus hamatus Wang, Zhang & Zhang, 2012 — China
- Phrurolithus hamdeokensis Seo, 1988 — Russia (south Siberia, Far East), Korea
- Phrurolithus kastoni Schenkel, 1950 — USA
- Phrurolithus kentuckyensis Chamberlin & Gertsch, 1930 — USA
- Phrurolithus labialis Paik, 1991 — Korea, Japan
- Phrurolithus lasiolepis Fu, Chen & Zhang, 2016 — China
- Phrurolithus leviculus Gertsch, 1936 — USA
- Phrurolithus longus Fu, Chen & Zhang, 2016 — China
- Phrurolithus luppovae Spassky, 1941 — Tajikistan
- Phrurolithus minimus C. L. Koch, 1839 — Europe
- Phrurolithus nemoralis Bryant, 1940 — Cuba
- Phrurolithus nigerus Yin, 2012 — China
- Phrurolithus nigrinus (Simon, 1878) — Central and southern Europe
- Phrurolithus nipponicus Kishida, 1914 — Japan
- Phrurolithus oabus Chamberlin & Ivie, 1935 — USA
- Phrurolithus palgongensis Seo, 1988 — Russia (Far East), China, Korea
- Phrurolithus paludivagus Bishop & Crosby, 1926 — USA
- Phrurolithus parcus (Hentz, 1847) — USA
- Phrurolithus pennatus Yaginuma, 1967 — Russia (south Siberia, Far East), China, Korea, Japan
- Phrurolithus pinturus Ivie & Barrows, 1935 — USA
- Phrurolithus pipensis Muma, 1945 — USA
- Phrurolithus pullatus Kulczyński, 1897 — Central Europe to Central Asia
- Phrurolithus pygmaeus Thorell, 1875 — Ukraine, Russia (Europe)
- Phrurolithus qiqiensis Yin, Ubick, Bao & Xu, 2004 — China
- Phrurolithus schwarzi Gertsch, 1941 — USA
- Phrurolithus shimenensis Yin, Peng, Gong & Kim, 1997 — China
- Phrurolithus similis Banks, 1895 — USA
- Phrurolithus singulus Gertsch, 1941 — USA
- Phrurolithus sinicus Zhu & Mei, 1982 — Russia (south Siberia, Far East), China, Korea, Japan
- Phrurolithus sordidus Savelyeva, 1972 — Kazakhstan
- Phrurolithus spinosus Bryant, 1948 — Hispaniola
- Phrurolithus splendidus Song & Zheng, 1992 — China, Japan
- Phrurolithus subannulus Fu, Chen & Zhang, 2016 — China
- Phrurolithus subnigerus Fu, Chen & Zhang, 2016 — China
- Phrurolithus szilyi Herman, 1879 — Portugal, Spain, Central to southeastern Europe
- Phrurolithus tamaulipanus Gertsch & Davis, 1940 — Mexico
- Phrurolithus taoyuan Fu, Chen & Zhang, 2016 — China
- Phrurolithus tepejicanus Gertsch & Davis, 1940 — Mexico
- Phrurolithus thracia Komnenov & Chatzaki, 2016 — Greece
- Phrurolithus umbratilis Bishop & Crosby, 1926 — USA
- Phrurolithus validus Fu, Chen & Zhang, 2016 — China
- Phrurolithus wallacei Gertsch, 1935 — USA
- Phrurolithus wanshou Yin, 2012 — China
- Phrurolithus zhejiangensis Song & Kim, 1991 — China
- Phrurolithus zhouyun Wang, Chen, Zhou, Zhang & Zhang, 2015 — China
- Phrurolithus zongxu Wang, Zhang & Zhang, 2012 — China

=== Phrurotimpus ===
Phrurotimpus

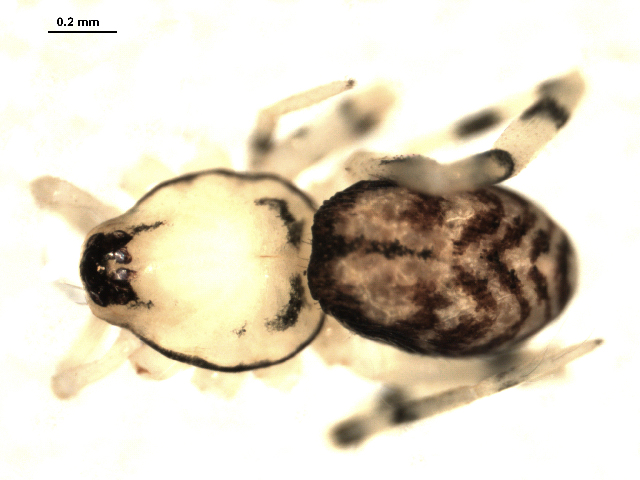
Phrurotimpus alarius

Phrurotimpus Chamberlin & Ivie, 1935

- Phrurotimpus abditus Gertsch, 1941 — USA
- Phrurotimpus alarius (Hentz, 1847) (type) — USA, Canada
  - Phrurotimpus alarius tejanus (Chamberlin & Gertsch, 1930) — USA, Canada
- Phrurotimpus borealis (Emerton, 1911) — North America
- Phrurotimpus certus Gertsch, 1941 — USA, Canada
- Phrurotimpus chamberlini Schenkel, 1950 — USA
- Phrurotimpus dulcineus Gertsch, 1941 — USA, Canada
- Phrurotimpus illudens Gertsch, 1941 — USA
- Phrurotimpus mateonus (Chamberlin & Gertsch, 1930) — USA
- Phrurotimpus minutus (Banks, 1892) — USA
- Phrurotimpus mormon (Chamberlin & Gertsch, 1930) — USA
  - Phrurotimpus mormon xanthus Chamberlin & Ivie, 1935 — USA
- Phrurotimpus parallelus (Chamberlin, 1921) — USA
- Phrurotimpus subtropicus Ivie & Barrows, 1935 — USA
- Phrurotimpus truncatus Chamberlin & Ivie, 1935 — USA
- Phrurotimpus woodburyi (Chamberlin & Gertsch, 1929) — USA
  - Phrurotimpus woodburyi utanus Chamberlin & Ivie, 1935 — USA

=== Piabuna ===
Piabuna Chamberlin & Ivie, 1933

- Piabuna brevispina Chamberlin & Ivie, 1935 — USA
- Piabuna longispina Chamberlin & Ivie, 1935 — USA
- Piabuna nanna Chamberlin & Ivie, 1933 (type) — USA
- Piabuna pallida Chamberlin & Ivie, 1935 — USA
- Piabuna reclusa Gertsch & Davis, 1940 — Mexico
- Piabuna xerophila Chamberlin & Ivie, 1935 — USA

=== Plynnon ===
Plynnon Deeleman-Reinhold, 2001

- Plynnon jaegeri Deeleman-Reinhold, 2001 — Indonesia (Sumatra)
- Plynnon longitarse Deeleman-Reinhold, 2001 — Borneo
- Plynnon zborowskii Deeleman-Reinhold, 2001 (type) — Borneo

== S ==
=== Scotinella ===
Scotinella Banks, 1911

- Scotinella britcheri (Petrunkevitch, 1910) — USA, Canada
- Scotinella brittoni (Gertsch, 1941) — USA, Canada
- Scotinella custeri Levi, 1951 — USA
- Scotinella deleta (Gertsch, 1941) — USA
- Scotinella divesta (Gertsch, 1941) — USA, Canada
- Scotinella divinula (Gertsch, 1941) — USA, Canada
- Scotinella dixiana Roddy, 1957 — USA
- Scotinella fratrella (Gertsch, 1935) — USA, Canada
- Scotinella madisonia Levi, 1951 — USA, Canada
- Scotinella manitou Levi, 1951 — USA
- Scotinella minnetonka (Chamberlin & Gertsch, 1930) — USA, Canada
- Scotinella pallida Banks, 1911 (type) — USA
- Scotinella pelvicolens (Chamberlin & Gertsch, 1930) — USA
- Scotinella pugnata (Emerton, 1890) — USA, Canada
- Scotinella redempta (Gertsch, 1941) — USA, Canada
- Scotinella sculleni (Gertsch, 1941) — USA, Canada
