= Scotinella dixiana =

Scientific classification
- Kingdom: Animalia
- Phylum: Arthropoda
- Subphylum: Chelicerata
- Class: Arachnida
- Order: Araneae
- Infraorder: Araneomorphae
- Family: Phrurolithidae
- Genus: Scotinella
- Species: S. dixiana

Binomial name
- Scotinella dixiana Roddy, 1957

Synonyms
- Phrurolithus dixianus Brignoli, 1983

Species of spider

Scotinella dixiana is a species of phrurolithid spider first described in 1957 from specimens collected at Greensburg, Louisiana in 1936. They are small spiders, the females being under 1/10th inch in length. The females have a dark yellowish brown carapace with faint black radiating streaks and a narrow marginal black seam, and a dusky abdomen marked with a broad transverse band near the middle, two pale spots near the base and four narrow pale chevrons in the caudal half. The male's coloration is similar to that of the female, with a shining brown scutum marked by a single broad pale stripe near the middle. The species closely resembles Scotinella redemptus but is smaller. Some scientific classification schemes place the species in the family Corinnidae.

== See also ==
- List of Phrurolithidae species
