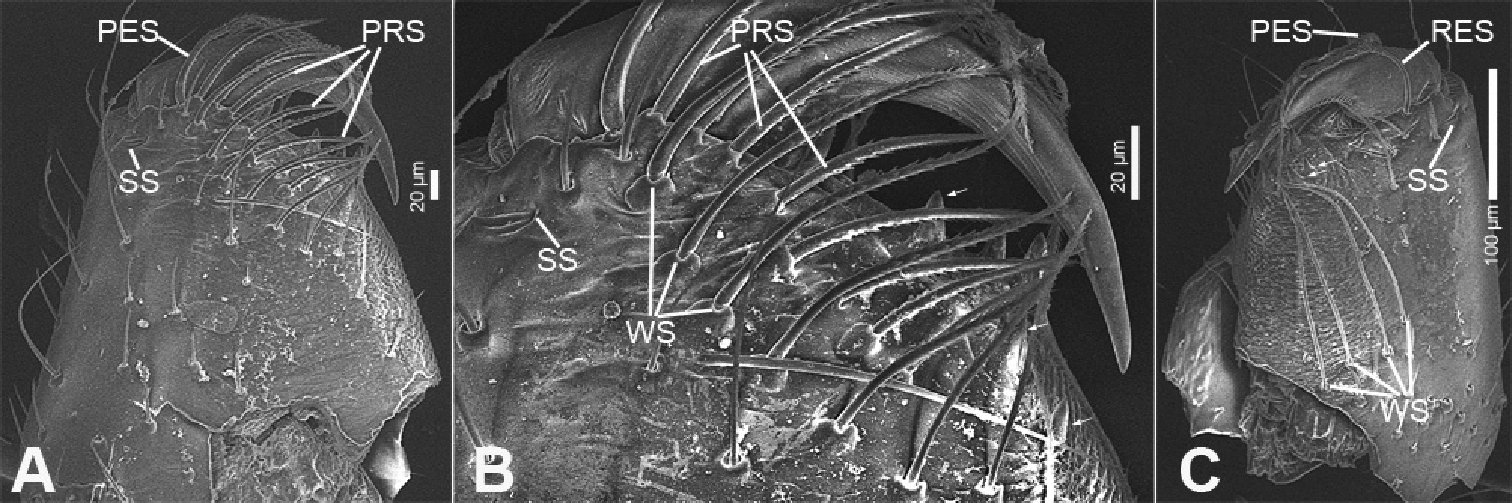

Scientific classification
- Kingdom: Animalia
- Phylum: Arthropoda
- Subphylum: Chelicerata
- Class: Arachnida
- Order: Araneae
- Infraorder: Araneomorphae
- Family: Phrurolithidae
- Genus: Alboculus; Liu, 2020
- Species: A. zhejiangensis

Binomial name
- Alboculus zhejiangensis (Song & Kim, 1991)

= Alboculus =

Genus of spiders

Alboculus is a monotypic genus of east Asian spiders in the family Phrurolithidae containing the single species, Alboculus zhejiangensis. As of 2020 it has only been found in China. A female was originally described under the name "Phrurolithus zhejiangensis", but was described under its new name when a male was identified by K. K. Liu, H. P. Luo and Y. H. Ying in 2020.

== See also ==
- Phrurolithus
- Otacilia
- List of Phrurolithidae species
