= Aculithus =

Scientific classification
- Domain: Eukaryota
- Kingdom: Animalia
- Phylum: Arthropoda
- Subphylum: Chelicerata
- Class: Arachnida
- Order: Araneae
- Infraorder: Araneomorphae
- Family: Phrurolithidae
- Genus: Aculithus; Liu & S. Q. Li, 2022

Type species
- Aculithus bijiashanicus (Liu, 2020)

Species
- 7, see text

Genus of spiders

Aculithus is a genus of araneomorph spiders in the family Phrurolithidae. It was first described by Ke-Ke Liu & Shuqiang Li in 2022.

== Species ==
As of February 2023, it contains seven species:

- Aculithus bijiashanicus (Liu, 2020) (type) — China
- Aculithus chongyi Liu & S. Q. Li, 2022 — China
- Aculithus fabiformis (Liu, Xu, Xiao, Yin & Peng, 2019) — China
- Aculithus hippocampus (Jin, Fu, Yin & Zhang, 2016) — China
- Aculithus subfabiformis (Liu, 2020) — China
- Aculithus taishan Liu & S. Q. Li, 2022 — China
- Aculithus xunwu Liu & S. Q. Li, 2022 — China
