= Xiaoliguang =

Scientific classification
- Domain: Eukaryota
- Kingdom: Animalia
- Phylum: Arthropoda
- Subphylum: Chelicerata
- Class: Arachnida
- Order: Araneae
- Infraorder: Araneomorphae
- Family: Phrurolithidae
- Genus: Xiaoliguang; Lin & Li, 2023
- Species: X. huarong

Binomial name
- Xiaoliguang huarong Lin & Li, 2023

Genus of spiders

Xiaoliguang is a monotypic genus of Phrurolithidae spiders, first described by Lin & Li in 2023. Its single species, Xiaoliguang huarong is distributed in Vietnam.
