= Bosselaerius =

Scientific classification
- Kingdom: Animalia
- Phylum: Arthropoda
- Subphylum: Chelicerata
- Class: Arachnida
- Order: Araneae
- Infraorder: Araneomorphae
- Family: Phrurolithidae
- Genus: Bosselaerius; Zamani & Marusik, 2020

Type species
- B. hyrcanicus Zamani & Marusik, 2020

Species
- Bosselaerius daoxianensis (Yin, Peng, Gong & Kim, 1997); Bosselaerius hyrcanicus Zamani & Marusik, 2020; Bosselaerius tajikistanicus Zamani & Marusik, 2020

Genus of spiders

Bosselaerius is a genus of Asian spiders in the family Phrurolithidae. It was first described by Alireza Zamani and Yuri M. Marusik in 2020. As of March 2022 it contains only three species: B. daoxianensis, B. hyrcanicus, and B. tajikistanicus.

== See also ==
- Phrurolithus
- List of Phrurolithidae species
