= Edelithus =

Scientific classification
- Kingdom: Animalia
- Phylum: Arthropoda
- Subphylum: Chelicerata
- Class: Arachnida
- Order: Araneae
- Infraorder: Araneomorphae
- Family: Phrurolithidae
- Genus: Edelithus; Liu & Li, 2022

Type species
- Edelithus shenmiguo Liu & Li, 2022

Species
- 5, see text

Genus of spiders

Edelithus is a genus of araneomorph spiders in the family Phrurolithidae. It was first described by Liu & Li in 2022.

== Species ==
As of February 2023 it contains five species:

- Edelithus huyanzhuo Lin & Li, 2023 — Vietnam
- Edelithus linchong Lin & Li, 2023 — Vietnam
- Edelithus puer Liu & Li, 2022 — China
- Edelithus qinming Lin & Li, 2023 — Vietnam
- Edelithus shenmiguo Liu & Li, 2022 (type) — China
