= Orthobula impressa =

Scientific classification
- Kingdom: Animalia
- Phylum: Arthropoda
- Subphylum: Chelicerata
- Class: Arachnida
- Order: Araneae
- Infraorder: Araneomorphae
- Family: Trachelidae
- Genus: Orthobula
- Species: O. impressa

Binomial name
- Orthobula impressa Simon, 1897

Species of spider

Orthobula impressa is a species of spiders of the genus Orthobula. It is native to India, Sri Lanka and the Seychelles.

== See also ==
- List of Phrurolithidae species
