= Grandilithus =

Scientific classification
- Domain: Eukaryota
- Kingdom: Animalia
- Phylum: Arthropoda
- Subphylum: Chelicerata
- Class: Arachnida
- Order: Araneae
- Infraorder: Araneomorphae
- Family: Phrurolithidae
- Genus: Grandilithus; Liu & S. Q. Li, 2022

Type species
- Grandilithus anyuan Liu & S. Q. Li, 2022

Species
- 30, see text

Genus of spiders

Grandilithus is a genus of araneomorph spiders in the family Phrurolithidae. It was first described by Liu & Li in 2022.

== Species ==
As of February 2023 it contains thirty species:

- Grandilithus anyuan Liu & S. Q. Li, 2022 (type) — China
- Grandilithus aobei Liu & S. Q. Li, 2022 — China
- Grandilithus bawangling (Fu, Zhang & Zhu, 2010) — China (Hainan)
- Grandilithus biarclatus (Fu, He & Zhang, 2015) — China (Hainan)
- Grandilithus dingnan Liu & S. Q. Li, 2022 — China
- Grandilithus dongguling Liu & S. Q. Li, 2022 — China
- Grandilithus ensifer (Mu & Zhang, 2021) — China
- Grandilithus fengshan Liu & S. Q. Li, 2022 — China
- Grandilithus florifer (Fu, He & Zhang, 2015) — China (Hainan)
- Grandilithus fujianus (Fu, Jin & Zhang, 2014) — China
- Grandilithus jianfengling (Fu, Zhang & Zhu, 2010) — China (Hainan)
- Grandilithus jiangshan Liu & S. Q. Li, 2022 — China
- Grandilithus jingshi Liu & S. Q. Li, 2022 — China
- Grandilithus limushan (Fu, Zhang & Zhu, 2010) — China (Hainan)
- Grandilithus linglingae Lin & Li, 2023 — Vietnam
- Grandilithus longjiatang Liu & S. Q. Li, 2022 — China
- Grandilithus longtanica (Liu, 2020) — China
- Grandilithus lynx (Kamura, 1994) — Taiwan, Japan (Ryukyu Is.)
- Grandilithus nanan Liu & S. Q. Li, 2022 — China
- Grandilithus ningdu Liu & S. Q. Li, 2022 — China
- Grandilithus nonggang (Liu, Xu, Xiao, Yin & Peng, 2019) — China
- Grandilithus taihe Liu & S. Q. Li, 2022 — China
- Grandilithus taiwanicus (Hayashi & Yoshida, 1993) — China, Taiwan, Japan
- Grandilithus tianyushan Liu & S. Q. Li, 2022 — China
- Grandilithus tupingao Liu & S. Q. Li, 2022 — China
- Grandilithus wanshou (Yin, 2012) — China
- Grandilithus wanzili Liu & S. Q. Li, 2022 — China
- Grandilithus xiaoxiicus (Liu, 2020) — China
- Grandilithus yangzhi Lin & Li, 2023 — Vietnam
- Grandilithus yunyin Liu & S. Q. Li, 2022 — China
