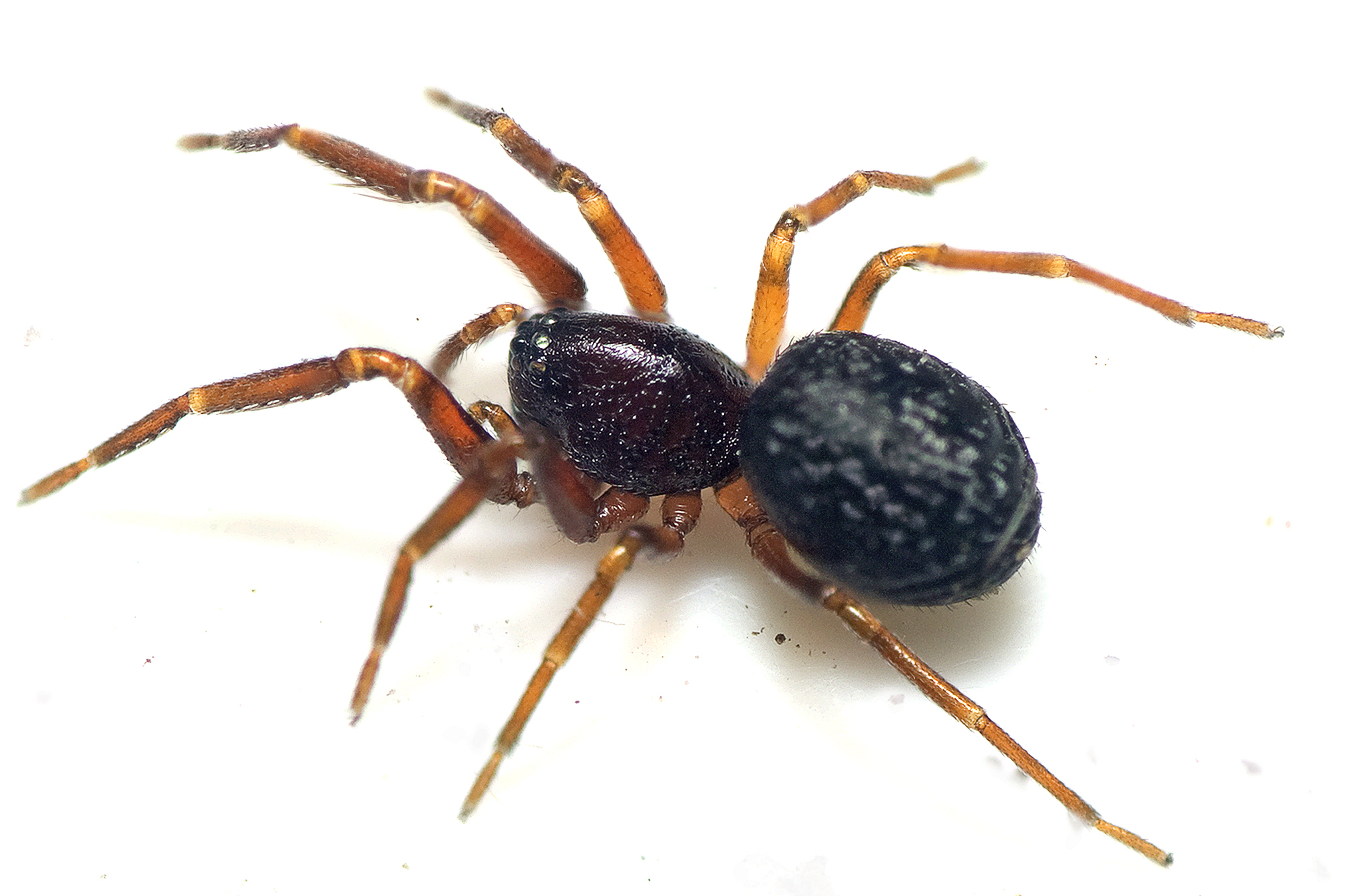
- Australian species
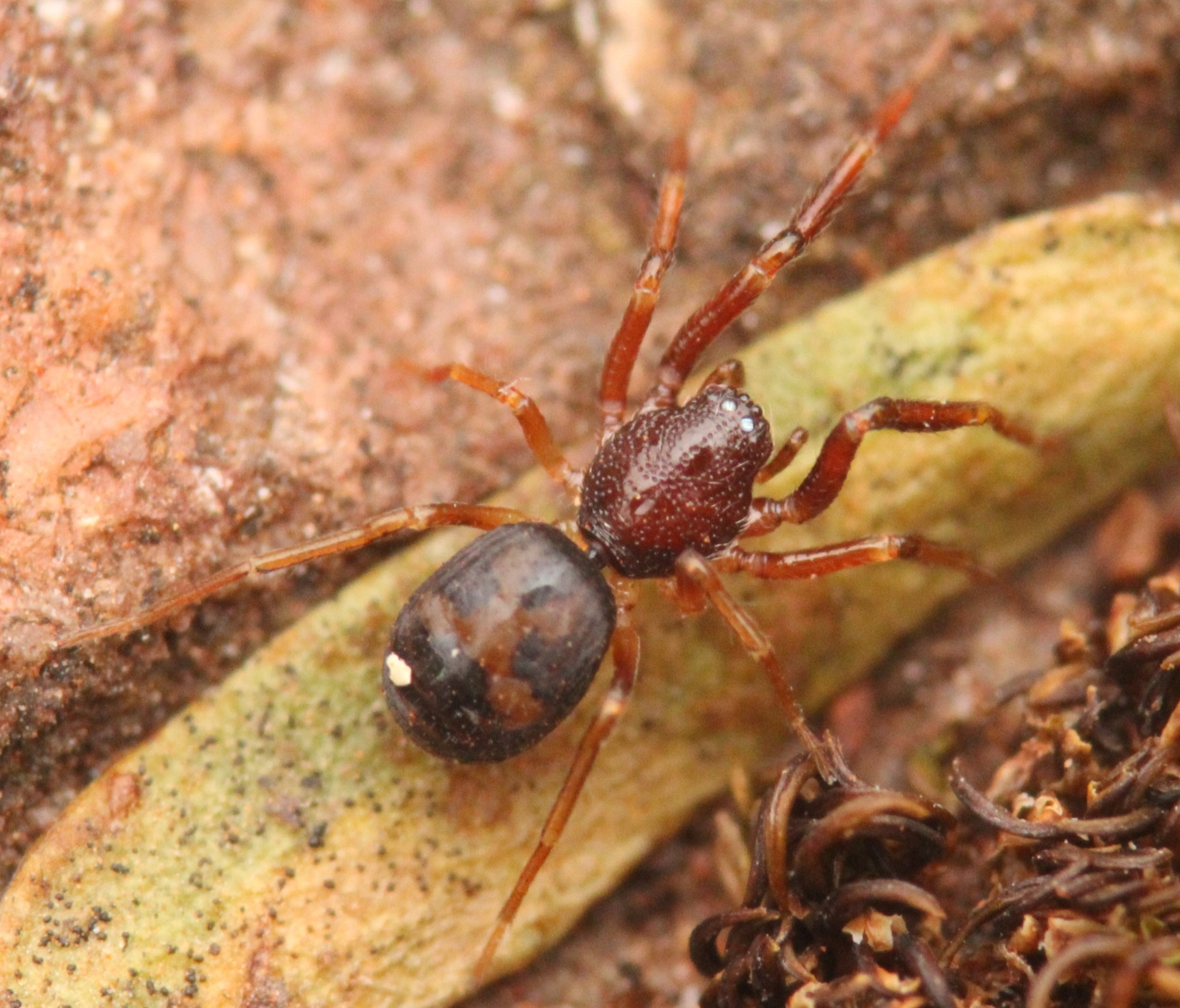
- O. radiata from Zimbabwe

Scientific classification
- Kingdom: Animalia
- Phylum: Arthropoda
- Subphylum: Chelicerata
- Class: Arachnida
- Order: Araneae
- Infraorder: Araneomorphae
- Family: Trachelidae
- Genus: Orthobula; Simon, 1897

Type species
- O. impressa Simon, 1897

Species
- 25, see text

= Orthobula =

Genus of spiders

Orthobula is a genus of araneomorph spiders first described by Eugène Simon in 1897 as a member of Liocranidae. It was transferred to Corinnidae in 2002, to Phrurolithidae in 2014, and to Trachelidae in 2017.

== Species ==
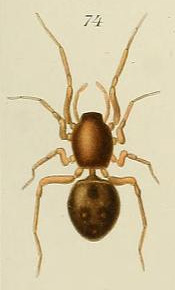
female O. crucifera

As of October 2025, this genus includes 25 species:

- Orthobula aethiopica Haddad, Jin & Platnick, 2022 – Ethiopia
- Orthobula arca Haddad, Jin & Platnick, 2022 – South Africa
- Orthobula bilobata Deeleman-Reinhold, 2001 – Indonesia (Sumatra, Borneo, Lesser Sunda Is.)
- Orthobula calceata Simon, 1897 – Sierra Leone, Ivory Coast, Ghana, Nigeria, Cameroon, Equatorial Guinea, DR Congo
- Orthobula charitonovi (Mikhailov, 1986) – Eastern Mediterranean to Central Asia
- Orthobula chayuensis Yang, Song & Zhu, 2003 – China
- Orthobula crucifera Bösenberg & Strand, 1906 – China, Korea, Japan
- Orthobula impressa Simon, 1897 – India, Sri Lanka, Seychelles, Réunion (type species)
- Orthobula jiangxi Liu, 2022 – China
- Orthobula marusiki Haddad, Jin & Platnick, 2022 – Gambia, Ivory Coast, Burkina Faso, Togo, Nigeria, Cameroon, Central African Rep.
- Orthobula mikhailovi Marusik, 2021 – Iran
- Orthobula milloti Caporiacco, 1949 – Kenya, Tanzania
- Orthobula nigra He & Jin, 2024 – China
- Orthobula puncta Yang, Song & Zhu, 2003 – China
- Orthobula pura Deeleman-Reinhold, 2001 – Indonesia (Sulawesi)
- Orthobula qinghaiensis Hu, 2001 – China
- Orthobula quadrinotata Deeleman-Reinhold, 2001 – Indonesia (Borneo, Sulawesi)
- Orthobula radiata Simon, 1897 – Zambia, Namibia, Botswana, Zimbabwe, Mozambique, South Africa
- Orthobula sicca Simon, 1903 – Madagascar
- Orthobula spiniformis Tso, Zhu, J. X. Zhang & F. Zhang, 2005 – Taiwan
- Orthobula sudamericana Piñanez & Munévar, 2022 – Paraguay, Argentina
- Orthobula tibenensis Hu, 2001 – China
- Orthobula trinotata Simon, 1896 – Philippines
- Orthobula yaginumai Platnick, 1977 – China
- Orthobula zhangmuensis Hu & Li, 1987 – China
