= Molestia =

Scientific classification
- Kingdom: Animalia
- Phylum: Arthropoda
- Subphylum: Chelicerata
- Class: Arachnida
- Order: Araneae
- Infraorder: Araneomorphae
- Family: Linyphiidae
- Genus: Molestia; Tu, Saaristo & Li, 2006

Type species
- Molestia molesta (Tao, Li & Zhu, 1995)

Species
- 5, see text

Genus of spiders

Molestia is a genus of East Asian dwarf spiders that was first described by L. H. Tu, Michael I. Saaristo & S. Q. Li in 2006.

== Species ==
As of January 2023 it contains five species, found in China and France:

- Molestia ancoraria Irfan, Zhang & Peng, 2022 – China
- Molestia caudata Irfan, Zhang & Peng, 2022 – China
- Molestia hamifera (Simon, 1884) – France, China
- Molestia molesta (Tao, Li & Zhu, 1995) (type) – China
- Molestia yaojiapingensis Irfan, Zhang & Peng, 2022 – China
