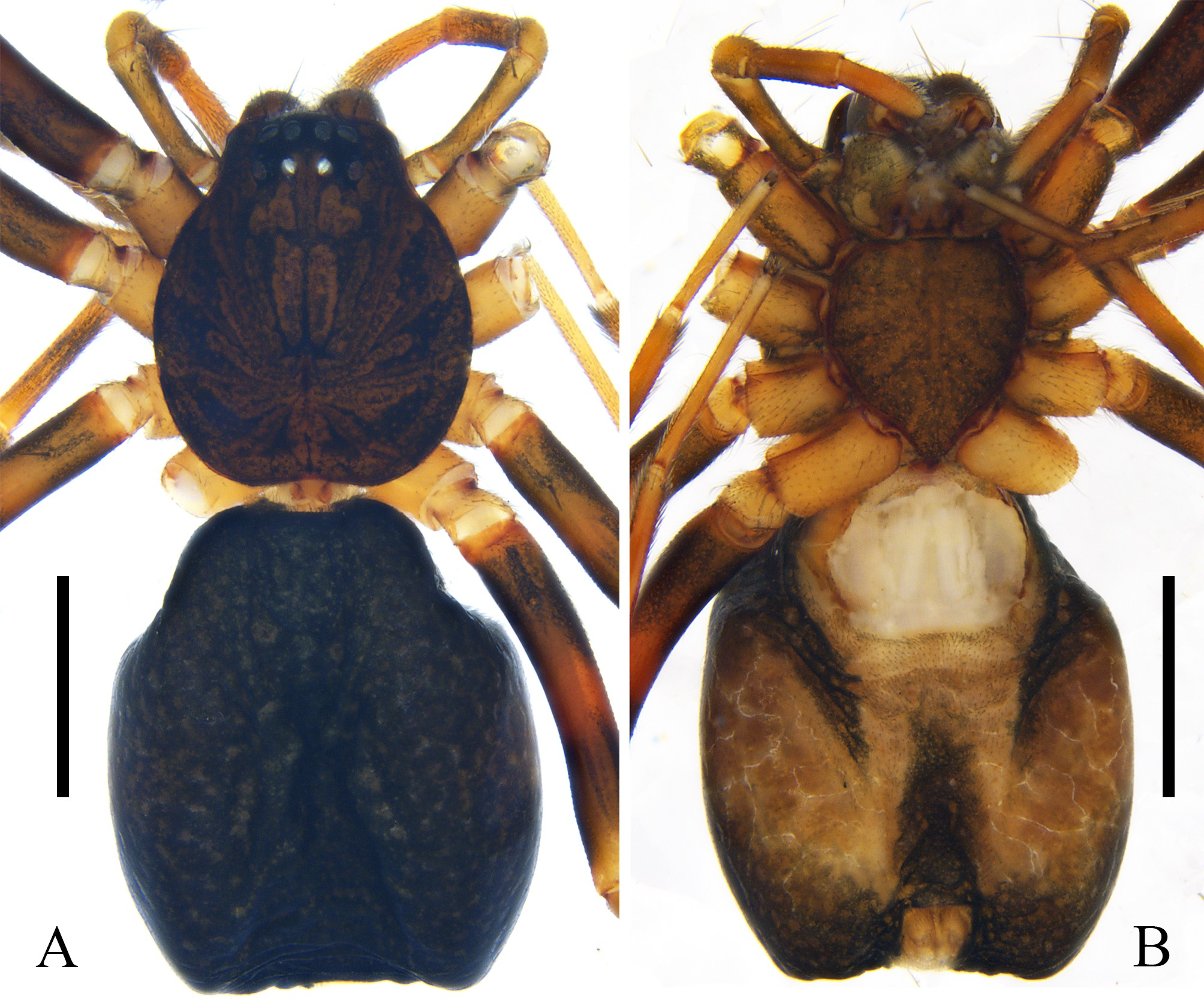
- female X. qizimeishanensis

Scientific classification
- Kingdom: Animalia
- Phylum: Arthropoda
- Subphylum: Chelicerata
- Class: Arachnida
- Order: Araneae
- Infraorder: Araneomorphae
- Family: Phrurolithidae
- Genus: Xilithus; Liu & Li, 2023

Type species
- Xilithus lingyun (Liu & S. Q. Li, 2022)

Species
- 22, see text

Synonyms
- Acrolithus Liu & S. Q. Li, 2022

= Xilithus =

Genus of spiders

Xilithus is a genus of araneomorph spiders in the family Phrurolithidae. It was first described by Liu & Li in 2023 as a replacement name for Acrolithus.

== Species ==
As of January 2026, this genus includes 22 species:

- Xilithus acerosus (Yao, Irfan & Peng, 2019) – China
- Xilithus acutus (Fu, Z. S. Zhang & F. Zhang, 2016) – China
- Xilithus auritus (Fu, Z. S. Zhang & F. Zhang, 2016) – China
- Xilithus digitatus (Fu, Z. S. Zhang & F. Zhang, 2016) – China
- Xilithus leibo (Fu, Z. S. Zhang & F. Zhang, 2016) – China
- Xilithus lingyun (Liu & S. Q. Li, 2022) – China
- Xilithus meles (Kamura, 2021) – Japan
- Xilithus mustela (Kamura, 2008) – Japan
- Xilithus ovatus (Fu, Z. S. Zhang & F. Zhang, 2016) – China
- Xilithus pseudostella (Fu, Jin & Zhang, 2014) – China
- Xilithus pugio Mu & Zhang, 2023 – China
- Xilithus qizimeishanensis J. Liu & Hu, 2024 – China
- Xilithus ruyii (Liu & S. Q. Li, 2022) – China
- Xilithus shijiao (Liu & S. Q. Li, 2022) – China
- Xilithus stella (Kamura, 2005) – Japan
- Xilithus vulpes (Kamura, 2001) – Japan
- Xilithus wangi Mu & Zhang, 2023 – China
- Xilithus xiajing (Liu & S. Q. Li, 2022) – China
- Xilithus xiaojing (Liu & S. Q. Li, 2022) – China
- Xilithus xingdoushanensis (Yao, Irfan & Peng, 2019) – China
- Xilithus yeniu (Liu & S. Q. Li, 2022) – China
- Xilithus zhangi (Fu, Jin & Zhang, 2014) – China
