= Brevitubus =

Scientific classification
- Kingdom: Animalia
- Phylum: Arthropoda
- Subphylum: Chelicerata
- Class: Arachnida
- Order: Araneae
- Infraorder: Araneomorphae
- Family: Phrurolithidae
- Genus: Brevitubus; Zhu, Liao, Yin & Xu, 2025

Type species
- B. ellipticus Zhu, Liao, Yin & Xu, 2025

Species
- 8, see text

Genus of spiders

Brevitubus is a genus of spiders in the family Phrurolithidae.

== Distribution ==
Brevitubus is endemic to China.

== Etymology ==
The genus name is Latin for "short tube", referring to the connecting tubes of females.

== Species ==
As of January 2026, this genus includes eight species:

- Brevitubus ailan (Liu, Xu, Xiao, Yin & Peng, 2019) – China
- Brevitubus ellipticus Zhu, Liao, Yin & Xu, 2025 – China
- Brevitubus haitun (Liu, Xu & Yin, 2023) – China
- Brevitubus jiulong (Liu & S. Q. Li, 2022) – China
- Brevitubus lunatus Zhu, Liao, Yin & Xu, 2025 – China
- Brevitubus pinglong (Liang, Q. Li, Yin, H. Li & Xu, 2021) – China
- Brevitubus subellipticus Zhu, Liao, Yin & Xu, 2025 – China
- Brevitubus subpinglong Zhu, Liao, Yin & Xu, 2025 – China
