= Lunalithus =

Scientific classification
- Domain: Eukaryota
- Kingdom: Animalia
- Phylum: Arthropoda
- Subphylum: Chelicerata
- Class: Arachnida
- Order: Araneae
- Infraorder: Araneomorphae
- Family: Phrurolithidae
- Genus: Lunalithus; Kamura, 2022
- Species: L. luna

Binomial name
- Lunalithus luna (Kamura, 1994)

Genus of spiders

Lunalithus is a monotypic genus of Phrurolithidae spiders, first described by Takahide Kamura in 2022. Its single species, Lunalithus luna is distributed in Japan.
