= Punctus (spider) =

Scientific classification
- Kingdom: Animalia
- Phylum: Arthropoda
- Subphylum: Chelicerata
- Class: Arachnida
- Order: Araneae
- Infraorder: Araneomorphae
- Family: Phrurolithidae
- Genus: Punctus; Mu & Zhang, 2023

Type species
- P. taibai Mu & Zhang, 2023

Species
- 3, see text

Genus of spiders

Punctus is a genus of spiders in the family Phrurolithidae.

== Distribution ==
The genus Punctus is endemic to China.

== Species ==
As of January 2026, this genus includes three species:

- Punctus maoxian Mu & Zhang, 2023 – China
- Punctus taibai Mu & Zhang, 2023 – China
- Punctus validus (Fu, Chen & Zhang, 2016) – China
