= Corealithus =

Scientific classification
- Domain: Eukaryota
- Kingdom: Animalia
- Phylum: Arthropoda
- Subphylum: Chelicerata
- Class: Arachnida
- Order: Araneae
- Infraorder: Araneomorphae
- Family: Phrurolithidae
- Genus: Corealithus; Kamura, 2021

Type species
- Corealithus coreanus (Paik, 1991)

Species
- C. coreanus (Paik, 1991) – Korea, Russia (Kurile Is.), Japan; C. subnigerus (Fu, Chen & Zhang, 2016) – China

Genus of spiders

Corealithus is a genus of Phrurolithidae spiders, first described by Takahide Kamura in 2021. It contains two species; C. coreanus and C. subnigerus, distributed in east Asia.
