= Phrurotimpus borealis =

Scientific classification
- Domain: Eukaryota
- Kingdom: Animalia
- Phylum: Arthropoda
- Subphylum: Chelicerata
- Class: Arachnida
- Order: Araneae
- Infraorder: Araneomorphae
- Family: Phrurolithidae
- Genus: Phrurotimpus
- Species: P. borealis

Binomial name
- Phrurotimpus borealis (Emerton, 1911)

Species of spider

Phrurotimpus borealis is a species of true spider in the family Phrurolithidae. It is found in North America.
