= Beatitas =

Scientific classification
- Kingdom: Animalia
- Phylum: Arthropoda
- Subphylum: Chelicerata
- Class: Arachnida
- Order: Araneae
- Infraorder: Araneomorphae
- Family: Phrurolithidae
- Genus: Beatitas; Mu & Zhang, 2023
- Species: B. octomaculatus

Binomial name
- Beatitas octomaculatus Mu & Zhang, 2023

Species of spider

Beatitas is a monotypic genus of spiders in the family Phrurolithidae containing the single species, Beatitas octomaculatus.

== Distribution ==
Beatitas octomaculatus has only been recorded from Guangxi Zhuang Autonomous Region in China.

== Etymology ==
The genus name is Latin "beatitas" ("happiness"), »referring to the beautiful appearance of spiders of this genus, which elicits positive feelings«. The species name means "eight-spotted" in Latin, for the eight light spots on the abdomen.
