= Pennalithus =

Scientific classification
- Domain: Eukaryota
- Kingdom: Animalia
- Phylum: Arthropoda
- Subphylum: Chelicerata
- Class: Arachnida
- Order: Araneae
- Infraorder: Araneomorphae
- Family: Phrurolithidae
- Genus: Pennalithus; Kamura, 2021

Type species
- Pennalithus pennatus (Yaginuma, 1967)

Species
- P. palgongensis (Seo, 1988) – Russia (Far East), China, Korea; P. pennatus (Yaginuma, 1967) – Russia (South Siberia, Far East), China, Korea, Japan; P. splendidus (Song & Zheng, 1992) – China, Korea, Japan; P. suguroi Kamura, 2021 – Japan

Genus of spiders

Pennalithus is a genus of Phrurolithidae spiders, first described by Takahide Kamura in 2021. It contains four species; P. palgongensis, P. pennatus, P. splendidus and P. suguroi, distributed in east Asia.
