= Lingulatus =

Scientific classification
- Domain: Eukaryota
- Kingdom: Animalia
- Phylum: Arthropoda
- Subphylum: Chelicerata
- Class: Arachnida
- Order: Araneae
- Infraorder: Araneomorphae
- Family: Phrurolithidae
- Genus: Lingulatus; Mu & Zhang, 2022

Type species
- Lingulatus pingbian Mu & Zhang, 2022

Species
- 11, see text

Genus of spiders

Lingulatus is a genus of araneomorph spiders in the family Phrurolithidae. It was first described by Mu & Zhang in 2022.

== Species ==
As of February 2023, it contains eleven species:

- Lingulatus brevis Mu & Zhang, 2022 — China
- Lingulatus chaijin Lin & Li, 2023 — Vietnam
- Lingulatus christae (Jäger & Wunderlich, 2012) — Laos
- Lingulatus dongping Lin & Li, 2023 — Vietnam
- Lingulatus liying Lin & Li, 2023 — Vietnam
- Lingulatus longfeiae Lin & Li, 2023 — Vietnam
- Lingulatus longulus Mu & Zhang, 2022 — China
- Lingulatus luzhishen Lin & Li, 2023 — Vietnam
- Lingulatus pingbian Mu & Zhang, 2022 (type) — China
- Lingulatus zhangqing Lin & Li, 2023 — Vietnam
- Lingulatus zhutong Lin & Li, 2023 — Vietnam
