= Mutatus =

Scientific classification
- Kingdom: Animalia
- Phylum: Arthropoda
- Subphylum: Chelicerata
- Class: Arachnida
- Order: Araneae
- Infraorder: Araneomorphae
- Family: Phrurolithidae
- Genus: Mutatus; Mu, Wang, F. Zhang & Z. S. Zhang, 2025

Type species
- M. gelao Mu, Wang, F. Zhang & Z. S. Zhang

Species
- 4, see text

Genus of spiders

Mutatus is a genus of spiders in the family Phrurolithidae.

== Distribution ==
All Mutatus species are endemic to China.

== Etymology ==
The genus name is derived from Latin "mutatio" ("variable"), referring to the mixture of characteristics resembling other genera.

== Species ==
As of January 2026, this genus includes four species:

- Mutatus gelao Mu, Wang, F. Zhang & Z. S. Zhang, 2025 – China
- Mutatus tianyan Mu, Wang, F. Zhang & Z. S. Zhang, 2025 – China
- Mutatus tujia Mu, Wang, F. Zhang & Z. S. Zhang, 2025 – China
- Mutatus yintiaoling Mu, Wang, F. Zhang & Z. S. Zhang, 2025 – China
