= Labialithus =

Scientific classification
- Domain: Eukaryota
- Kingdom: Animalia
- Phylum: Arthropoda
- Subphylum: Chelicerata
- Class: Arachnida
- Order: Araneae
- Infraorder: Araneomorphae
- Family: Phrurolithidae
- Genus: Labialithus; Kamura, 2021

Type species
- Labialithus labialis (Paik, 1991)

Species
- L. labialis (Paik, 1991) – Korea, Japan; L. subnigerus (Marusik, Omelko & Koponen, 2020) – Russia

Genus of spiders

Labialithus is a genus of Phrurolithidae spiders, first described by Takahide Kamura in 2021. It contains two species; L. labialis and L. lindemanni, distributed in east Asia.
