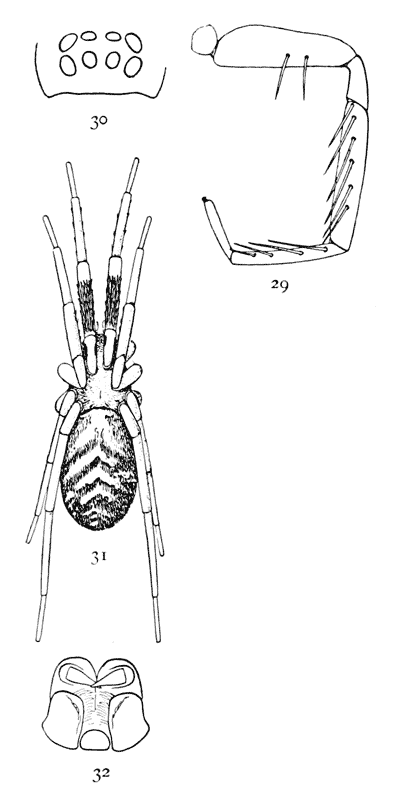

Scientific classification
- Domain: Eukaryota
- Kingdom: Animalia
- Phylum: Arthropoda
- Subphylum: Chelicerata
- Class: Arachnida
- Order: Araneae
- Infraorder: Araneomorphae
- Family: Phrurolithidae
- Genus: Phrurotimpus
- Species: P. alarius

Binomial name
- Phrurotimpus alarius (Hentz, 1847)

= Phrurotimpus alarius =

Species of spider

Phrurotimpus alarius is a species of true spider in the family Phrurolithidae. It is found in the United States and Canada.

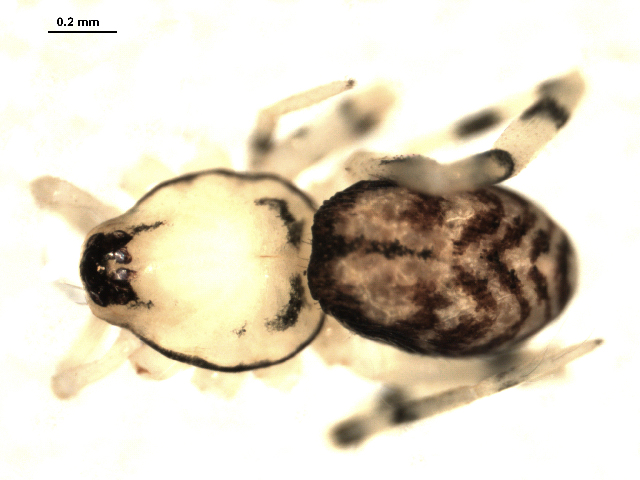

== Subspecies ==
These two subspecies belong to the species Phrurotimpus alarius:

- (Phrurotimpus alarius alarius) (Hentz, 1847)
- Phrurotimpus alarius tejanus (Chamberlin & Gertsch, 1930)
