= Phrurotimpus certus =

Scientific classification
- Domain: Eukaryota
- Kingdom: Animalia
- Phylum: Arthropoda
- Subphylum: Chelicerata
- Class: Arachnida
- Order: Araneae
- Infraorder: Araneomorphae
- Family: Phrurolithidae
- Genus: Phrurotimpus
- Species: P. certus

Binomial name
- Phrurotimpus certus Gertsch, 1941

Species of spider

Phrurotimpus certus is a species of true spider in the family Phrurolithidae. It is found in the United States and Canada.
