= Scotinella minnetonka =

Scientific classification
- Kingdom: Animalia
- Phylum: Arthropoda
- Subphylum: Chelicerata
- Class: Arachnida
- Order: Araneae
- Infraorder: Araneomorphae
- Family: Phrurolithidae
- Genus: Scotinella
- Species: S. minnetonka

Binomial name
- Scotinella minnetonka (Chamberlin & Gertsch, 1930)

Species of spider

Scotinella minnetonka is a species of true spider in the family Phrurolithidae. It is found in the United States and Canada.
