= Drassinella =

Scientific classification
- Kingdom: Animalia
- Phylum: Arthropoda
- Subphylum: Chelicerata
- Class: Arachnida
- Order: Araneae
- Infraorder: Araneomorphae
- Family: Liocranidae
- Genus: Drassinella; Banks, 1904

Type species
- D. modesta Banks, 1904

Species
- 6, see text

Synonyms
- Gosiphrurus Chamberlin & Ivie, 1935

Genus of spiders

Drassinella is a genus of North American araneomorph spiders in the family Phrurolithidae, first described by Nathan Banks in 1904.

== Species ==
As of January 2022, Drassinella contains six species:

- Drassinella gertschi Platnick & Ubick, 1989 – USA, Mexico
- Drassinella modesta Banks, 1904 (type) – USA
- Drassinella sclerata (Chamberlin & Ivie, 1935) – USA
- Drassinella siskiyou Platnick & Ubick, 1989 – USA
- Drassinella sonoma Platnick & Ubick, 1989 – USA
- Drassinella unicolor (Chamberlin & Ivie, 1935) – USA
