= Scotinella fratrella =

Scientific classification
- Domain: Eukaryota
- Kingdom: Animalia
- Phylum: Arthropoda
- Subphylum: Chelicerata
- Class: Arachnida
- Order: Araneae
- Infraorder: Araneomorphae
- Family: Phrurolithidae
- Genus: Scotinella
- Species: S. fratrella

Binomial name
- Scotinella fratrella (Gertsch, 1935)

Species of spider

Scotinella fratrella is a species of true spider in the family Phrurolithidae. It is found in the United States and Canada.
