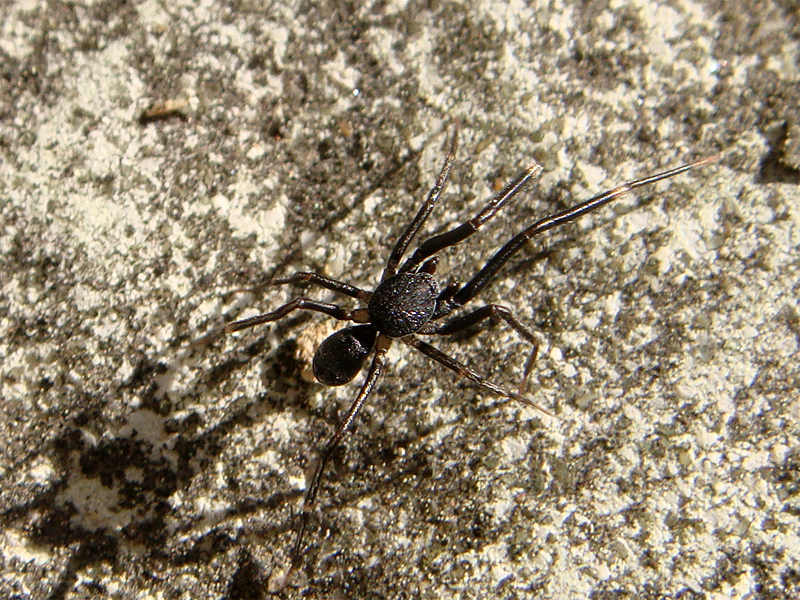
- Liophrurillus flavitarsis

Scientific classification
- Domain: Eukaryota
- Kingdom: Animalia
- Phylum: Arthropoda
- Subphylum: Chelicerata
- Class: Arachnida
- Order: Araneae
- Infraorder: Araneomorphae
- Family: Phrurolithidae
- Genus: Liophrurillus; Wunderlich, 1992
- Species: L. flavitarsis

Binomial name
- Liophrurillus flavitarsis (Lucas, 1846)

Synonyms
- Liophrurillus grandis Denis, 1964

= Liophrurillus =

Genus of spiders

Liophrurillus is a monotypic genus of araneomorph spiders in the family Phrurolithidae, containing the single species, Liophrurillus flavitarsis. It was first described by J. Wunderlich in 1992 as a possible corinnid sac spider, and was moved to Phrurolithidae in 2014. It has only been found in Europe and North Africa.
