= Abdosetae =

Scientific classification
- Domain: Eukaryota
- Kingdom: Animalia
- Phylum: Arthropoda
- Subphylum: Chelicerata
- Class: Arachnida
- Order: Araneae
- Infraorder: Araneomorphae
- Family: Phrurolithidae
- Genus: Abdosetae; Fu, Zhang & MacDermott, 2010

Type species
- A. hainan Fu, Zhang & MacDermott, 2010

Species
- 5, see text

Genus of spiders

Abdosetae is a genus of Asian araneomorph spiders in the family Phrurolithidae, first described by J. Y. Fu, F. Zhang & J. MacDermott in 2010.

== Species ==
As of April 2019 it contains five species:

- Abdosetae digitata Jin, Fu & Zhang, 2015 – China
- Abdosetae falcata Jin, Fu & Zhang, 2015 – China
- Abdosetae hainan Fu, Zhang & MacDermott, 2010 (type) – China
- Abdosetae hamata Jin, Fu & Zhang, 2015 – China
- Abdosetae ornata (Deeleman-Reinhold, 2001) – Borneo
