= Plynnon =

Scientific classification
- Domain: Eukaryota
- Kingdom: Animalia
- Phylum: Arthropoda
- Subphylum: Chelicerata
- Class: Arachnida
- Order: Araneae
- Infraorder: Araneomorphae
- Family: Phrurolithidae
- Genus: Plynnon; Deeleman-Reinhold, 2001

Type species
- P. zborowskii Deeleman-Reinhold, 2001

Species
- P. jaegeri Deeleman-Reinhold, 2001 – Indonesia (Sumatra); P. longitarse Deeleman-Reinhold, 2001 – Borneo; P. zborowskii Deeleman-Reinhold, 2001 – Borneo

Genus of spiders

Plynnon is a genus of Southeast Asian araneomorph spiders in the family Phrurolithidae, first described by Christa L. Deeleman-Reinhold in 2001. As of April 2019 it contains only three species, all from Indonesia and Borneo.
