= Piabuna =

Scientific classification
- Kingdom: Animalia
- Phylum: Arthropoda
- Subphylum: Chelicerata
- Class: Arachnida
- Order: Araneae
- Infraorder: Araneomorphae
- Family: Phrurolithidae
- Genus: Piabuna; Chamberlin & Ivie, 1933

Type species
- P. nanna Chamberlin & Ivie, 1933

Species
- 6, see text

Genus of spiders

Piabuna is a genus of North American araneomorph spiders first described by R. V. Chamberlin & Wilton Ivie in 1933. Originally added to the Liocranidae, it was moved to the Corinnidae in 2002, then to the Phrurolithidae in 2014.

== Species ==
As of April 2019 it contains six species:

- Piabuna brevispina Chamberlin & Ivie, 1935 – USA
- Piabuna longispina Chamberlin & Ivie, 1935 – USA
- Piabuna nanna Chamberlin & Ivie, 1933 (type) – USA
- Piabuna pallida Chamberlin & Ivie, 1935 – USA
- Piabuna reclusa Gertsch & Davis, 1940 – Mexico
- Piabuna xerophila Chamberlin & Ivie, 1935 – USA
