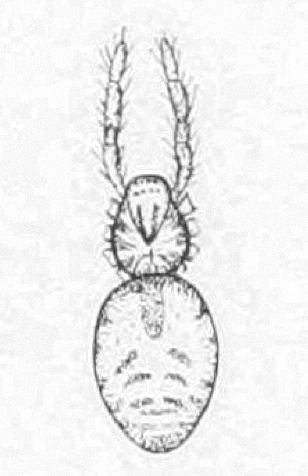
- female D. spinnipes

Scientific classification
- Domain: Eukaryota
- Kingdom: Animalia
- Phylum: Arthropoda
- Subphylum: Chelicerata
- Class: Arachnida
- Order: Araneae
- Infraorder: Araneomorphae
- Family: Phrurolithidae
- Genus: Dorymetaecus; Rainbow, 1920

Species
- Dorymetaecus dalmasi (Berland, 1924); Dorymetaecus spinnipes Rainbow, 1920

= Dorymetaecus =

Genus of spiders

Dorymetaecus is a genus of araneomorph spiders in the family Phrurolithidae, containing two species, Dorymetaecus spinnipes and Dorymetaecus dalmasi. Dorymetaecus dalmasi is recorded from New Caledonia. Dorymetaecus spinnipes was first described by William Joseph Rainbow in 1920, and is found on Lord Howe Island and south-eastern parts of Australia. Rainbow died in November 1919, shortly before publication of the work this species is described in.

== Description ==
The holotype was found on Kentia palms, and only the female of this species is known. Its cephalothorax is 1.5 millimetres (0.059 in) long and 1 millimetre (0.039 in) wide. The opisthosoma is 2.1 millimetres (0.083 in) long and 4 millimetres (0.16 in) wide.

Cephalothorax obovate, broad, well arched, yellow, with two dark-brown wavy lines behind the eyes, and with black lateral margins, close to which are smoky-brown patches. Pars cephalica not raised, sloping gently forward, narrow in front, truncated, segmental groove faintly distinct; clypeus narrow. Pars thoracica sloping rearwards, radial grooves moderately defined; median stria short, distinct, lateral margins slightly reflexed; marginal band narrow. Eyes in two recurved rows of four each, close together, rear median ones widest apart; front row shorter, close to edge of clypeus; posterior eyes larger. Legs yellow, long, robust, bespined; first and second pairs longest and strongest; tibia i and ii armed with seven pairs of long, strong yellow spines, and meta-tarsi of same with four pairs; bases of spines large, black; spines on legs iii and iv short and weak. Relative lengths, 4, 1, 2, 3. Palpi concolorous, moderately long, armed with a few rather long spines. Falces yellow, short, arched, not strong; inferior ridge of each falx armed with two very small teeth, and the superior with two even smaller ones; fang short, weak. Maxillae short, robust, arched, yellow, apices inclined inwards, constricted near base. Labium concolorous, arched, short, broad, about as long as width of base; apex rounded. Sternum cordate, broad, yellow, arched, terminating obtusely between fourth pair of coxae. Abdomen ovate, arched, slightly overhanging base of cephalothorax, yellow; superior surface ornamented with smoky-brown markings. Epigynum a moderately large plaque, the margin of which is dark brown and raised. Spinnerets yellow, short; superior pair cylindrical, biarticulate, terminal segment shortest; inferior pair rather stout; coniform, biarticulate, apical segment minute, dome-shaped.
