= Phrurolinillus =

Scientific classification
- Kingdom: Animalia
- Phylum: Arthropoda
- Subphylum: Chelicerata
- Class: Arachnida
- Order: Araneae
- Infraorder: Araneomorphae
- Family: Phrurolithidae
- Genus: Phrurolinillus; Wunderlich, 1995

Type species
- P. tibialis (Simon, 1878)

Species
- P. lisboensis Wunderlich, 1995 – Portugal; P. tibialis (Simon, 1878) – Spain

Genus of spiders

Phrurolinillus is a genus of European araneomorph spiders first described by Jörg Wunderlich in 1995. Originally placed with the Corinnidae, it was moved to the Phrurolithidae in 2014. As of April 2019 it contains only two species from the Iberian Peninsula.
