= Phonotimpus =

Scientific classification
- Domain: Eukaryota
- Kingdom: Animalia
- Phylum: Arthropoda
- Subphylum: Chelicerata
- Class: Arachnida
- Order: Araneae
- Infraorder: Araneomorphae
- Family: Phrurolithidae
- Genus: Phonotimpus; Gertsch & Davis, 1940

Type species
- P. separatus Gertsch & Davis, 1940

Species
- 32, see text

Genus of spiders

Phonotimpus is a genus of North American araneomorph spiders in the family Phrurolithidae. It was first described by Willis J. Gertsch and Louie Irby Davis in 1940, and placed with the Liocranidae. It was transferred to Corinnidae in 2002, then to the Phrurolithidae in 2014.

== Species ==
As of December 2022 it contains thirty-two species, all found in Mexico:

- Phonotimpus ahuacatlan Platnick, Chamé-Vázquez & Ibarra-Núñez, 2022 – Mexico
- Phonotimpus arcitos Platnick, Chamé-Vázquez & Ibarra-Núñez, 2022 – Mexico
- Phonotimpus boneti Platnick, Chamé-Vázquez & Ibarra-Núñez, 2022 – Mexico
- Phonotimpus calenturas Platnick, Chamé-Vázquez & Ibarra-Núñez, 2022 – Mexico
- Phonotimpus chipinque Platnick, Chamé-Vázquez & Ibarra-Núñez, 2022 – Mexico
- Phonotimpus cielo Platnick, Chamé-Vázquez & Ibarra-Núñez, 2022 – Mexico
- Phonotimpus cima Platnick, Chamé-Vázquez & Ibarra-Núñez, 2022 – Mexico
- Phonotimpus cuauhtemoc Platnick, Chamé-Vázquez & Ibarra-Núñez, 2022 – Mexico
- Phonotimpus cumbres Platnick, Chamé-Vázquez & Ibarra-Núñez, 2022 – Mexico
- Phonotimpus elviejo Platnick, Chamé-Vázquez & Ibarra-Núñez, 2022 – Mexico
- Phonotimpus escondida Platnick, Chamé-Vázquez & Ibarra-Núñez, 2022 – Mexico
- Phonotimpus eutypus Gertsch & Davis, 1940 – Mexico
- Phonotimpus farias Platnick, Chamé-Vázquez & Ibarra-Núñez, 2022 – Mexico
- Phonotimpus frio Platnick, Chamé-Vázquez & Ibarra-Núñez, 2022 – Mexico
- Phonotimpus gertschi Platnick, Chamé-Vázquez & Ibarra-Núñez, 2022 – Mexico
- Phonotimpus llera Platnick, Chamé-Vázquez & Ibarra-Núñez, 2022 – Mexico
- Phonotimpus marialuisae Chamé-Vázquez & Ibarra-Núñez, 2019 – Mexico
- Phonotimpus padillai Chamé-Vázquez, Campuzano & Ibarra-Núñez, 2021 – Mexico
- Phonotimpus pennimani Chamé-Vázquez, Ibarra-Núñez & Jiménez, 2018 – Mexico
- Phonotimpus perra Platnick, Chamé-Vázquez & Ibarra-Núñez, 2022 – Mexico
- Phonotimpus pozas Platnick, Chamé-Vázquez & Ibarra-Núñez, 2022 – Mexico
- Phonotimpus puente Platnick, Chamé-Vázquez & Ibarra-Núñez, 2022 – Mexico
- Phonotimpus revilla Platnick, Chamé-Vázquez & Ibarra-Núñez, 2022 – Mexico
- Phonotimpus sanpedro Platnick, Chamé-Vázquez & Ibarra-Núñez, 2022 – Mexico
- Phonotimpus schulzefenai (Chamberlin & Ivie, 1936) – Mexico
- Phonotimpus separatus Gertsch & Davis, 1940 (type) – Mexico
- Phonotimpus talquian Chamé-Vázquez, Ibarra-Núñez & Jiménez, 2018 – Mexico
- Phonotimpus taman Platnick, Chamé-Vázquez & Ibarra-Núñez, 2022 – Mexico
- Phonotimpus tetrico Platnick, Chamé-Vázquez & Ibarra-Núñez, 2022 – Mexico
- Phonotimpus vacas Platnick, Chamé-Vázquez & Ibarra-Núñez, 2022 – Mexico
- Phonotimpus valles Platnick, Chamé-Vázquez & Ibarra-Núñez, 2022 – Mexico
- Phonotimpus xilitla Platnick, Chamé-Vázquez & Ibarra-Núñez, 2022 – Mexico
