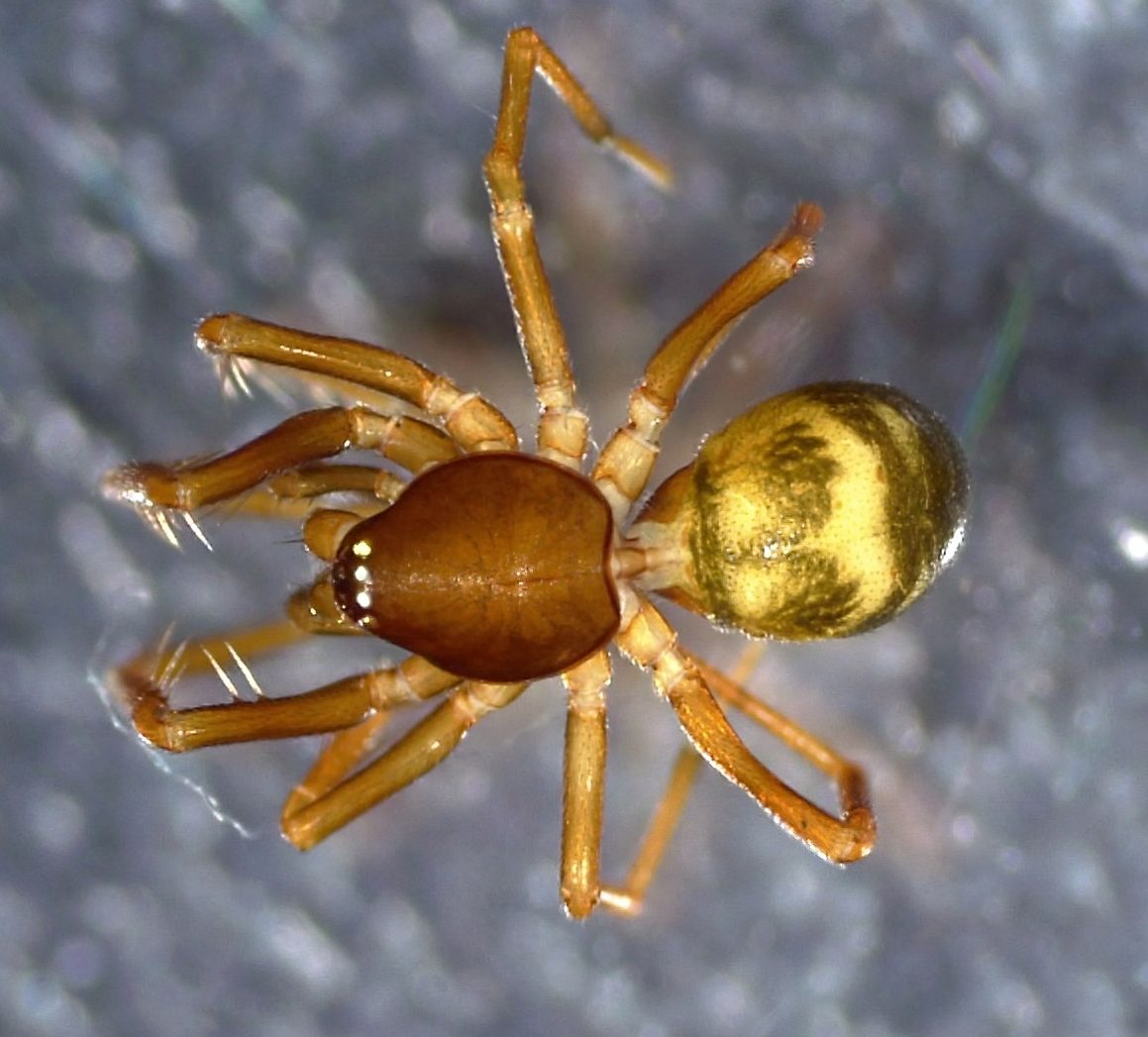
- Female

Scientific classification
- Kingdom: Animalia
- Phylum: Arthropoda
- Subphylum: Chelicerata
- Class: Arachnida
- Order: Araneae
- Infraorder: Araneomorphae
- Family: Phrurolithidae
- Genus: Scotinella
- Species: S. redempta

Binomial name
- Scotinella redempta Gertsch, 1941

Synonyms
- Phruronellus similis Chamberlain & Gertsch, 1930; Phrurolithus redemptus Gertsch, 1941; Scotinella redemptus Roddy, 1957

= Scotinella redempta =

Species of spider

Scotinella redempta is a species of true spider in the family Phrurolithidae, found in the eastern United States and Canada. It has a reddish-brown cephalothorax, and an abdomen with alternating patterns of light and dark spots and stripes. While little is known about the species biology, it is associated with deciduous forests, where it is most commonly found through sifting leaf litter.

== Taxonomy ==
Scotinella redempta was originally misidentified in 1930 as the species Scotinella similis (then Phrurolithus similis) by Willis J. Gertsch. He later discovered this error and described it as Phrurolithus redemptus in 1941. The species was eventually transferred to the genus Scotinella, and the specific epithet was consequently altered to agree with the gender of the genus.

== Description ==
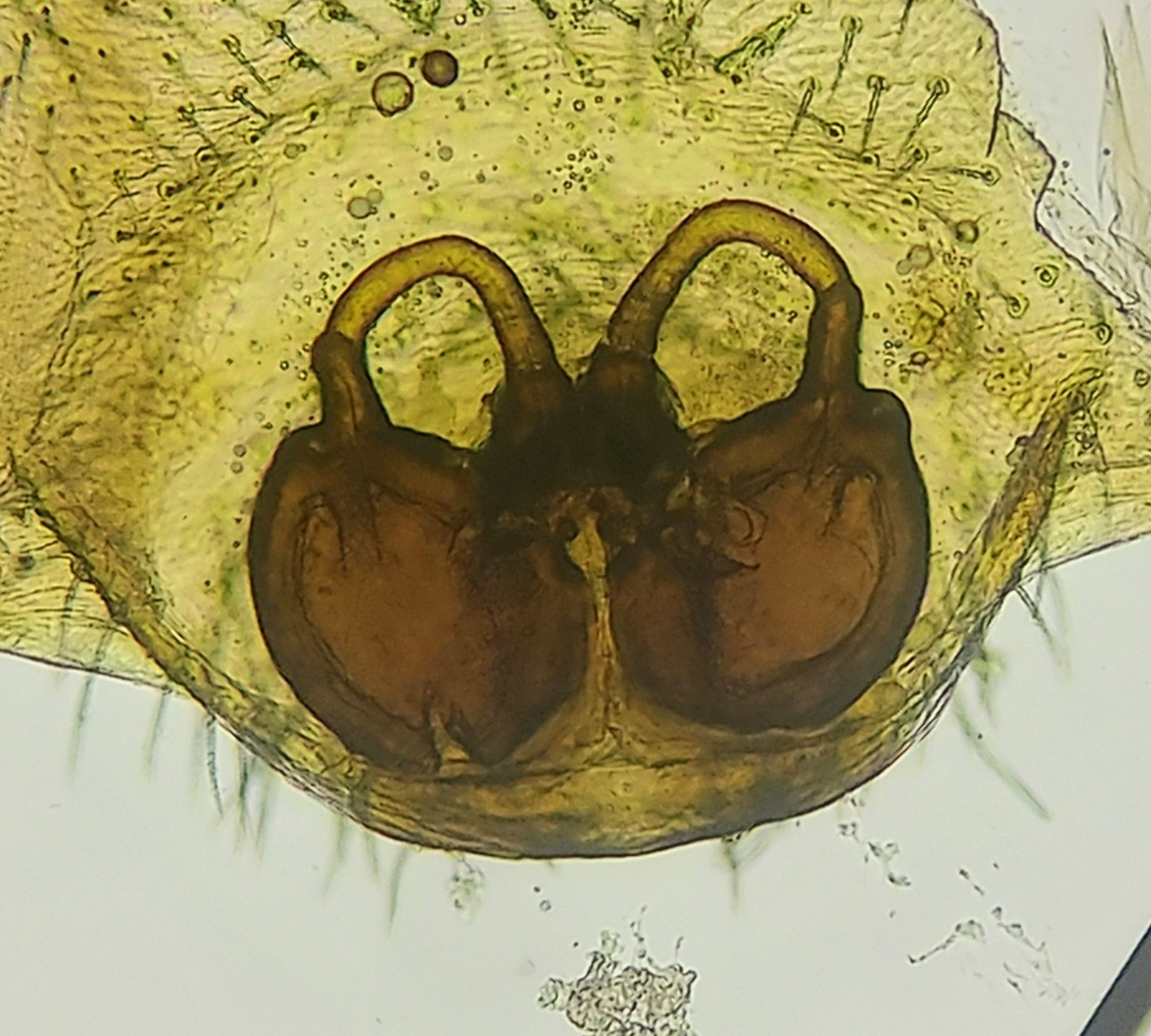
Dissected epigynum of Scotinella redempta

Scotinella redempta is a small spider, with males averaging 2.13 mm in length and females 2.35 mm in length. The carapace is reddish-brown, with faint traces of radiating dark marks. The sternum is brownish orange. The abdomen is dark grey, with two light spots near the anterior end, a W-shaped marking near the middle, and four thinner light markings on the posterior end. Like many species in the family Phrurolithidae, the first two pairs of legs possess prominent spines.

Scotinella redempta can most easily be identified through inspection of the genitalia. Males can be identified by the presence of a sharp, outwards-directing projection at the base of the retrolateral tibial apophysis, in combination with a small, straight and abruptly narrowed embolus. Females can be identified by the combination of small, closely spaced copulatory openings situated at the center of the epigynum, and by large, ovoid spermathecae.
