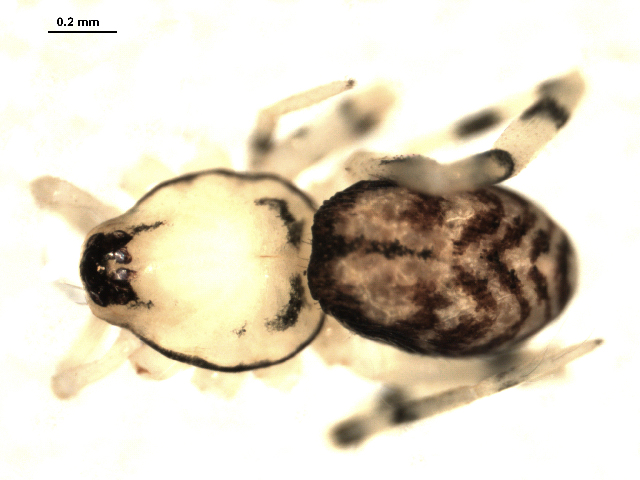
- Phrurotimpus alarius
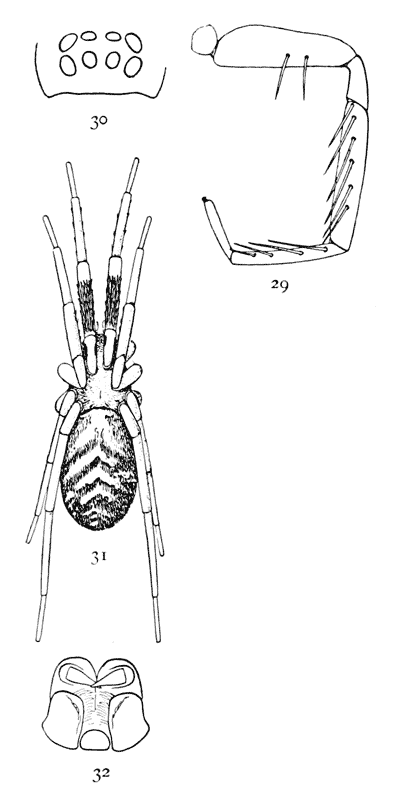

Scientific classification
- Kingdom: Animalia
- Phylum: Arthropoda
- Subphylum: Chelicerata
- Class: Arachnida
- Order: Araneae
- Infraorder: Araneomorphae
- Family: Phrurolithidae
- Genus: Phrurotimpus; Chamberlin & Ivie, 1935

Type species
- P. alarius (Hentz, 1847)

Species
- 26, see text

= Phrurotimpus =

Genus of spiders

Phrurotimpus is a genus of araneomorph spiders first described by R. V. Chamberlin and Wilton Ivie in 1935. The name is a compound adjective meaning "guarding the stone". Originally added to the Liocranidae, it was moved to the Corinnidae in 2002, then to the Phrurolithidae in 2014. They have red egg sacs that look like flattened discs, often found on the underside of stones.

== Species ==
As of December 2022 it contains twenty-six species in North America and China:

- Phrurotimpus abditus Gertsch, 1941 – USA
- Phrurotimpus alarius (Hentz, 1847) (type) – USA, Canada
  - Phrurotimpus a. tejanus (Chamberlin & Gertsch, 1930) – USA, Canada
- Phrurotimpus annulatus Chamberlin & Ivie, 1944 – USA
- Phrurotimpus baoshanensis Mu, Lin & Zhang, 2022 – China
- Phrurotimpus bernikerae Platnick, 2019 – USA
- Phrurotimpus borealis (Emerton, 1911) – North America
- Phrurotimpus certus Gertsch, 1941 – USA, Canada
- Phrurotimpus chamberlini Schenkel, 1950 – USA
- Phrurotimpus daliensis Mu, Lin & Zhang, 2022 – China
- Phrurotimpus dulcineus Gertsch, 1941 – USA, Canada
- Phrurotimpus illudens Gertsch, 1941 – USA
- Phrurotimpus lasiolepis (Fu, Chen & Zhang, 2016) – China
- Phrurotimpus mateonus (Chamberlin & Gertsch, 1930) – USA
- Phrurotimpus minutus (Banks, 1892) – USA
- Phrurotimpus mormon (Chamberlin & Gertsch, 1930) – USA
  - Phrurotimpus m. xanthus Chamberlin & Ivie, 1935 – USA
- Phrurotimpus palustris (Banks, 1892) – Canada, USA
- Phrurotimpus parallelus (Chamberlin, 1921) – USA
- Phrurotimpus sorkini Platnick, 2019 – USA
- Phrurotimpus subtropicus Ivie & Barrows, 1935 – USA
- Phrurotimpus truncatus Chamberlin & Ivie, 1935 – USA
- Phrurotimpus umbratilis (Bishop & Crosby, 1926) – USA
- Phrurotimpus wallacei (Gertsch, 1935) – USA
- Phrurotimpus woodburyi (Chamberlin & Gertsch, 1929) – USA, Mexico
  - Phrurotimpus w. utanus Chamberlin & Ivie, 1935 – USA
