= Scotinella =

Scientific classification
- Domain: Eukaryota
- Kingdom: Animalia
- Phylum: Arthropoda
- Subphylum: Chelicerata
- Class: Arachnida
- Order: Araneae
- Infraorder: Araneomorphae
- Family: Phrurolithidae
- Genus: Scotinella; Banks, 1911

Type species
- S. pallida Banks, 1911

Species
- 24, see text

Genus of spiders

Scotinella is a genus of North American araneomorph spiders in the family Phrurolithidae, first described by Nathan Banks in 1911.

== Species ==
As of February 2022 it contains twenty-four species:

- Scotinella adjacens (Gertsch & Davis, 1940) – Mexico
- Scotinella approximata (Gertsch & Davis, 1940) – Mexico
- Scotinella britcheri (Petrunkevitch, 1910) – USA, Canada
- Scotinella brittoni (Gertsch, 1941) – USA, Canada
- Scotinella coahuilana (Gertsch & Davis, 1940) – Mexico
- Scotinella custeri Levi, 1951 – USA
- Scotinella debilis (Gertsch & Davis, 1940) – Mexico
- Scotinella deleta (Gertsch, 1941) – USA
- Scotinella diversa (Gertsch & Davis, 1940) – Mexico
- Scotinella divesta (Gertsch, 1941) – USA, Canada
- Scotinella divinula (Gertsch, 1941) – USA, Canada
- Scotinella dixiana Roddy, 1957 – USA
- Scotinella elpotosi Chamé-Vázquez & Jiménez, 2022 – Mexico
- Scotinella fratrella (Gertsch, 1935) – USA, Canada
- Scotinella madisonia Levi, 1951 – USA, Canada
- Scotinella manitou Levi, 1951 – USA
- Scotinella minnetonka (Chamberlin & Gertsch, 1930) – USA, Canada
- Scotinella pallida Banks, 1911 (type) – USA
- Scotinella pelvicolens (Chamberlin & Gertsch, 1930) – USA
- Scotinella pugnata (Emerton, 1890) – USA, Canada
- Scotinella redempta (Gertsch, 1941) – USA, Canada
- Scotinella sculleni (Gertsch, 1941) – USA, Canada
- Scotinella tamaulipana (Gertsch & Davis, 1940) – Mexico
- Scotinella tepejicana (Gertsch & Davis, 1940) – Mexico
