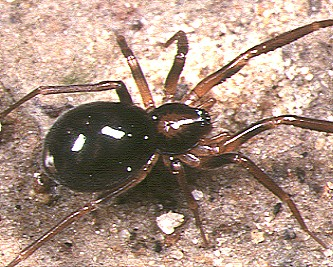

Scientific classification
- Domain: Eukaryota
- Kingdom: Animalia
- Phylum: Arthropoda
- Subphylum: Chelicerata
- Class: Arachnida
- Order: Araneae
- Infraorder: Araneomorphae
- Family: Phrurolithidae
- Genus: Otacilia; Thorell, 1897

Type species
- O. armatissima Thorell, 1897

Species
- 123, see text

Synonyms
- Palaetyra

= Otacilia =

Genus of spiders

Otacilia is a genus of araneomorph spiders in the family Phrurolithidae, first described by Tamerlan Thorell in 1897.

== Species ==
As of July 2024 it contains 143 species:

- Otacilia acerosa Yao, Irfan & Peng, 2019 — China
- Otacilia acuta Fu, Zhang & Zhang, 2016 — China
- Otacilia acutangula Liu, 2020 — China
- Otacilia ailan Liu, Xu, Xiao, Yin & Peng, 2019 — China
- Otacilia allomanubrium Mu & Zhang, 2023 — China
- Otacilia ambon Deeleman-Reinhold, 2001 — Indonesia (Moluccas)
- Otacilia anfu K. K. Liu, 2023 — China
- Otacilia annula (Zhou, Wang & Zhang, 2013) — China
- Otacilia ansula Jang, Lee, Bae & Kim, 2023 — Korea
- Otacilia antica (Wang, Chen, Zhou, Zhang & Zhang, 2015) — China
- Otacilia aotou Liu & S. Q. Li, 2022 — China
- Otacilia arcuata Mu & Zhang, 2021 — China
- Otacilia armatissima Thorell, 1897 — Myanmar
- Otacilia aurita Fu, Zhang & Zhang, 2016 — China
- Otacilia bawangling Fu, Zhang & Zhu, 2010 — China
- Otacilia biarclata Fu, He & Zhang, 2015 — China
- Otacilia bicolor Jäger & Wunderlich, 2012 — Laos
- Otacilia bifida (Yin, Ubick, Bao & Xu, 2004) — China
- Otacilia bifurcata Dankittipakul & Singtripop, 2014 — Thailand
- Otacilia bijiashanica Liu, 2020 — China
- Otacilia bizhouica Liu, 2020 — China
- Otacilia cangshan (Yang, Fu, Zhang & Zhang, 2010) — China
- Otacilia celata (Fu, Chen & Zhang, 2016) — China
- Otacilia christae Jäger & Wunderlich, 2012 — Laos
- Otacilia clavata (Yao, Irfan & Peng, 2019) — China
- Otacilia coreana (Paik, 1991) — Korea, Russia (Kurile Is.), Japan
- Otacilia curvata Jin, Fu, Yin & Zhang, 2016 — China
- Otacilia dadongshanica Liu, 2021 — China
- Otacilia damingshanica Liu, Xu & Yin, 2023 — China
- Otacilia daweishan Liu, Xu, Xiao, Yin & Peng, 2019 — China
- Otacilia daxiang Du, Pu & Yang, 2013 — China
- Otacilia dentigera Mu & Zhang, 2021 — China
- Otacilia dianchiensis (Yin, Peng, Gong & Kim, 1997) — China
- Otacilia digitata Fu, Zhang & Zhang, 2016 — China
- Otacilia distorta Shi, Mu & Zheng, 2024 — China
- Otacilia dongshang Liu & S. Q. Li, 2022 — China
- Otacilia ensifera Mu & Zhang, 2021 — China
- Otacilia fabiformis Liu, Xu, Xiao, Yin & Peng, 2019 — China
- Otacilia fanjingshan (Wang, Chen, Zhou, Zhang & Zhang, 2015) — China
- Otacilia fansipan Jäger & Dimitrov, 2019 — Vietnam
- Otacilia fausta (Paik, 1991) — Korea
- Otacilia flexa Fu, Zhang & Zhang, 2016 — China
- Otacilia florifera Fu, He & Zhang, 2015 — China
- Otacilia forcipata Yang, Wang & Yang, 2013 — China
- Otacilia foveata (Song, 1990) — China
- Otacilia fujiana Fu, Jin & Zhang, 2014 — China
- Otacilia furcata Mu, Jin & Zheng, 2022 — China
- Otacilia gougunao Liu, 2020 — China
- Otacilia guanshen K. K. Liu, 2023 — China
- Otacilia guizhumao Liu & S. Q. Li, 2022 — China
- Otacilia guoi Mu, Jin & Zhang, 2022 — China
- Otacilia guposhan Mu & Zhang, 2023 — China
- Otacilia haitun Liu, Xu & Yin, 2023 — China
- Otacilia hamata (Wang, Zhang & Zhang, 2012) — China
- Otacilia hengshan (Song, 1990) — China
- Otacilia hippocampa Jin, Fu, Yin & Zhang, 2016 — China
- Otacilia horizon Mu & Zhang, 2023 — China
- Otacilia hushandong Liu & S. Q. Li, 2022 — China
- Otacilia impleta Mu & Zhang, 2023 — China
- Otacilia involuta (Yao, Irfan & Peng, 2019) — China
- Otacilia jiajinshan Mu, Jin & Zhang, 2022 — China
- Otacilia jiandao Liu, Xu, Xiao, Yin & Peng, 2019 — China
- Otacilia jianfengling Fu, Zhang & Zhu, 2010 — China
- Otacilia jiulianshan Liu & S. Q. Li, 2022 — China
- Otacilia kamurai Ono & Ogata, 2018 — Japan
- Otacilia kao Jäger & Wunderlich, 2012 — Thailand, Vietnam
- Otacilia khezu Lin & Li, 2024 — China
- Otacilia komurai (Yaginuma, 1952) — China, Korea, Japan
- Otacilia lata Yao, Irfan & Peng, 2019 — China
- Otacilia linghua Liu & S. Q. Li, 2022 — China
- Otacilia leibo Fu, Zhang & Zhang, 2016 — China
- Otacilia limushan Fu, Zhang & Zhu, 2010 — China
- Otacilia liupan Hu & Zhang, 2011 — China
- Otacilia liuxinyei Lin & Li, 2023 — Vietnam
- Otacilia longa (Fu, Chen & Zhang, 2016) — China
- Otacilia longbu Liu & S. Q. Li, 2022 — China
- Otacilia longissima Liu, Xu & Yin, 2023 — China
- Otacilia longituba Wang, Zhang & Zhang, 2012 — China
- Otacilia longtanica Liu, 2020 — China
- Otacilia loriot Jäger & Wunderlich, 2012 — Laos
- Otacilia lubrica Mu & Zhang, 2021 — China
- Otacilia luna (Kamura, 1994) — Japan
- Otacilia luzonica (Simon, 1898) — Philippines
- Otacilia lynx (Kamura, 1994) — Taiwan, Japan
- Otacilia macrospora Fu, Z. S. Zhang & F. Zhang, 2016 — China
- Otacilia maliu Mu & Zhang, 2023 — China
- Otacilia meles Kamura, 2021 — Japan
- Otacilia menghuo Mu, Jin & Zhang, 2022 — China
- Otacilia microstoma Wang, Chen, Zhou, Zhang & Zhang, 2015 — China
- Otacilia mingsheng Yang, Wang & Yang, 2013 — China
- Otacilia mingyueshan K. K. Liu, 2023 — China
- Otacilia mira Fu, Zhang & Zhang, 2016 — China
- Otacilia mustela Kamura, 2008 — Japan
- Otacilia namkhan Jäger & Wunderlich, 2012 — Laos
- Otacilia nanhuashanica Liu, 2020 — China
- Otacilia nigerus (Yin, 2012) — China
- Otacilia nonggang Liu, Xu, Xiao, Yin & Peng, 2019 — China
- Otacilia obesa Fu, Z. S. Zhang & F. Zhang, 2016 — China
- Otacilia onoi Deeleman-Reinhold, 2001 — Thailand
- Otacilia ovata Fu, Zhang & Zhang, 2016 — China
- Otacilia ovoidea Liu, 2020 — China
- Otacilia palgongensis (Seo, 1988) — Russia (Far East), China, Korea
- Otacilia palmata Yao, Irfan & Peng, 2019 — China
- Otacilia papilion Fu, Zhang & Zhang, 2016 — China
- Otacilia papilla Dankittipakul & Singtripop, 2014 — Indonesia (Sumatra)
- Otacilia paracymbium Jäger & Wunderlich, 2012 — China
- Otacilia parva Deeleman-Reinhold, 2001 — Indonesia (Sumatra)
- Otacilia pennata (Yaginuma, 1967) — Russia (South Siberia, Far East), China, Korea, Japan
- Otacilia ping Liu & S. Q. Li, 2022 — China
- Otacilia pinglong Liang, Q. Li, Yin, H. Li & Xu, 2021 — China
- Otacilia pingwu Shi, Mu & Zhang, 2024 — China
- Otacilia pugnus Shi, Mu & Zhang, 2024 — China
- Otacilia pseudostella Fu, Jin & Zhang, 2014 — China
- Otacilia pyriformis Fu, Zhang & Zhang, 2016 — China
- Otacilia qingyuan Liu & S. Q. Li, 2022 — China
- Otacilia qiqiensis (Yin, Ubick, Bao & Xu, 2004) — China
- Otacilia revoluta (Yin, Ubick, Bao & Xu, 2004) — China
- Otacilia rulinensis Yao, Irfan & Peng, 2019 — China
- Otacilia sanbai Liu & S. Q. Li, 2022 — China
- Otacilia saszykaska Jäger, 2022 — Laos
- Otacilia shanxi Mu & Zhang, 2021 — China
- Otacilia shaoyao Mu & Zhang, 2023 — China
- Otacilia shennongjia Mu & Zhang, 2023 — China
- Otacilia shenshanica Liu, 2020 — China
- Otacilia shuijiang Liu & S. Q. Li, 2022 — China
- Otacilia shunhuangshana Mu, Ju & Zhang, 2022 — China
- Otacilia simianshan Zhou, Wang & Zhang, 2013 — China
- Otacilia sinifera Deeleman-Reinhold, 2001 — Thailand
- Otacilia songi Wang, Chen, Zhou, Zhang & Zhang, 2015 — China
- Otacilia spina Mu & Zhang, 2023 — China
- Otacilia spiralis Mu & Zhang, 2021 — China
- Otacilia splendida (Song & Zheng, 1992) — China, Japan
- Otacilia squamaca (Yao, Irfan & Peng, 2019) — China
- Otacilia stella Kamura, 2005 — Japan
- Otacilia striata Mu & Zhang, 2023 — China
- Otacilia subannula (Fu, Chen & Zhang, 2016) — China
- Otacilia subdentigera Mu & Zhang, 2023 — China
- Otacilia subfabiformis Liu, 2020 — China
- Otacilia subforcipata Mu & Zhang, 2023 — China
- Otacilia subkomurai Mu, Jin & Zhang, 2022 — China
- Otacilia subliupan Wang, Chen, Zhou, Zhang & Zhang, 2015 — China
- Otacilia submicrostoma Jin, Fu, Yin & Zhang, 2016 — China
- Otacilia subnigerus (Fu, Chen & Zhang, 2016) — China
- Otacilia subovoidea Liu, 2020 — China
- Otacilia suining Shi, Mu & Zhang, 2024 — China
- Otacilia taiwanica (Hayashi & Yoshida, 1993) — China, Taiwan, Japan
- Otacilia taoyuan (Fu, Chen & Zhang, 2016) — China
- Otacilia tham Jäger, 2022 — Laos
- Otacilia tianhua Liu & S. Q. Li, 2022 — China
- Otacilia tingwei Liu, Xu & Yin, 2023 — China
- Otacilia triangula Mu, Jin & Zhang, 2022 — China
- Otacilia truncata Dankittipakul & Singtripop, 2014 — Thailand
- Otacilia valida (Fu, Chen & Zhang, 2016) — China
- Otacilia vangvieng Jäger & Wunderlich, 2012 — Laos
- Otacilia vulpes (Kamura, 2001) — Japan
- Otacilia wanshi Liu & S. Q. Li, 2022 — China
- Otacilia wanshou (Yin, 2012) — China
- Otacilia wenbi Mu & Zhang, 2023 — China
- Otacilia wugongshanica Liu, 2020 — China
- Otacilia wuli Mu & Zhang, 2021 — China
- Otacilia wusong Lin & Li, 2023 — Vietnam
- Otacilia wuxi Zheng & Mu, 2024 — China
- Otacilia wuzhifeng Liu & S. Q. Li, 2022 — China
- Otacilia xiangshan Liu & S. Q. Li, 2022 — China
- Otacilia xiaobu Liu & S. Q. Li, 2022 — China
- Otacilia xiaoxiica Liu, 2020 — China
- Otacilia xingdoushanensis Yao, Irfan & Peng, 2019 — China
- Otacilia xueshanensis Mu, Jin & Zhang, 2022 — China
- Otacilia xuning Lin & Li, 2023 — Vietnam
- Otacilia yangi Zhang, Fu & Zhu, 2009 — China
- Otacilia yangming Liu & S. Q. Li, 2022 — China
- Otacilia yangmingensis Jin, Fu, Yin & Zhang, 2016 — China
- Otacilia yinae Liu, Xu, Xiao, Yin & Peng, 2019 — China
- Otacilia yongjia Mu & Zhang, 2023 — China
- Otacilia yusishanica Liu, 2020 — China
- Otacilia zaoshiica Liu, 2020 — China
- Otacilia zebra Deeleman-Reinhold, 2001 — Thailand
- Otacilia zhangi Fu, Jin & Zhang, 2014 — China
- Otacilia zhouyun (Wang, Chen, Zhou, Zhang & Zhang, 2015) — China
- Otacilia ziyaoshanica Liu, 2020 — China
- Otacilia zongxu (Wang, Zhang & Zhang, 2012) — China
