= Shuqiang Li =

Chinese arachnologist

- 李枢强
- Born: 1965 (age 60–61); Baoding, Hebei, China
- Other name: Shu-Qiang Li
- Education: Hebei University (BSc, 1985) Jilin University (MSc, 1988) University of Hohenheim (PhD, 1998)
- Scientific career
- Fields: Arachnology, Zoology
- Workplaces: Institute of Zoology, Chinese Academy of Sciences (1988–Present)
- Patrons: National Natural Science Foundation of China

Shuqiang Li is a Chinese arachnologist and a professor at the Institute of Zoology of the Chinese Academy of Sciences. Li is best known for his work with spiders and has described hundreds of new species and many genera. He is Editor in Chief of the journal Zoological Systematics (formerly Acta Zootaxonomica Sinica).

== Selected publications ==
- Tong, Y.F. & Li, S.Q (2007) One new genus and four new species of oonopid spiders from Southwest China (Araneae: Oonopidae). Annales Zoologici 57(2): 331–340.
- Wang X.P., Zhu M.S. & Li S (2010) A review of the coelotine genus Eurocoelotes (Araneae: Amaurobiidae). Journal of Arachnology 38: 79–98.
- Lin, Y., & Li, S (2014) Mysmenidae (Arachnida, Araneae), a spider family newly recorded from Vietnam. Zootaxa, 3826(1), 169–194. 10.11646/zootaxa.3826.1.5
- Chang Liu, Fengyuan Li, Shuqiang Li, et al. (2017) Five new genera of the subfamily Psilodercinae (Araneae: Ochyroceratidae) from Southeast Asia. Zoological Systematics, 42(4): 395–417.
- Tong Y, Chen H, Liu S, Li S (2018) A new genus of oonopid spiders from Myanmar (Araneae, Oonopidae). ZooKeys 794: 31–43. 10.3897/zookeys.794.29156
- Chang W-J, Li S (2019) Fourteen new species of the spider genus Thaiderces from Southeast Asia (Araneae, Psilodercidae). ZooKeys 869: 103–146. 10.3897/zookeys.869.35546
- Chang W-J, Li S (2020) Thirty-one new species of the spider genus Leclercera from Southeast Asia (Araneae, Psilodercidae). ZooKeys 913: 1-87. 10.3897/zookeys.913.48650
- Lin Y, Li S (2020) Two new genera and eight new species of jumping spiders (Araneae, Salticidae) from Xishuangbanna, Yunnan, China. ZooKeys 952: 95–128. 10.3897/zookeys.952.51849
- Chang W-J, Yao Z, Li S (2020) Twenty-eight new species of the spider genus Merizocera Fage, 1912 (Araneae, Psilodercidae) from South and Southeast Asia. ZooKeys 961: 41–118. 10.3897/zookeys.961.53058
- Xu H, Zhang X, Yao Z, Ali A, Li S (2021) Thirty-five new species of the spider genus Pimoa (Araneae, Pimoidae) from Pan-Himalaya. ZooKeys 1029: 1-92. 10.3897/zookeys.1029.64080
- Cheng W, Bian D, Tong Y, Li S (2021) A new genus and two new species of oonopid spiders from Tibet, China (Araneae, Oonopidae). ZooKeys 1052: 55–69. 10.3897/zookeys.1052.66402
