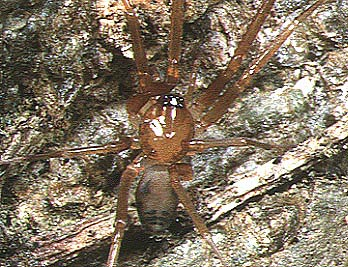
- Otacilia lynx

Scientific classification
- Kingdom: Animalia
- Phylum: Arthropoda
- Subphylum: Chelicerata
- Class: Arachnida
- Order: Araneae
- Infraorder: Araneomorphae
- Family: Phrurolithidae; Banks, 1892

Diversity
- 27 genera, 421 species
- blue: reported countries (WSC) green: observation hotspots (iNaturalist)

= Phrurolithidae =

Phrurolithidae Temporal range: Palaeogene–present

Family of spiders

Phrurolithidae is a family of araneomorph spiders, known as guardstone spiders. The family was first described by Nathan Banks in 1892. First included in the Corinnidae as the subfamily Phrurolithinae, later phylogenetic studies justified a separate family.

== Genera ==
As of January 2026, this family includes 27 genera and 421 species:

- Abdosetae Fu, Zhang & MacDermott, 2010 – China, Malaysia
- Aculithus Liu & S. Q. Li, 2022 – China
- Alboculus Liu, 2020 – China
- Beatitas Mu & Zhang, 2023 – China
- Bosselaerius Zamani & Marusik, 2020 – Tajikistan, Azerbaijan, Iran
- Brevitubus Zhu, Liao, Yin & Xu, 2025 – China
- Corealithus Kamura, 2021 – China, Japan, Korea, Russia
- Dorymetaecus Rainbow, 1920 – Lord Howe Island, New Caledonia
- Edelithus Liu & Li, 2022 – China, Vietnam
- Grandilithus Liu & S. Q. Li, 2022 – China, Japan, Taiwan, Vietnam
- Labialithus Kamura, 2021 – China, Japan, Korea, Russia
- Lingulatus Mu & Zhang, 2022 – China, Laos, Vietnam
- Liophrurillus Wunderlich, 1992 – Algeria, Morocco, Madeira, Romania, Italy, Portugal, Spain, France
- Lunalithus Kamura, 2022 – Japan
- Mutatus Mu, Wang, F. Zhang & Z. S. Zhang, 2025 – China
- Otacilia Thorell, 1897 – Asia
- Pennalithus Kamura, 2021 – China, Japan, Korea, Russia
- Phonotimpus Gertsch & Davis, 1940 – Mexico, Mexiko
- Phrurolinillus Wunderlich, 1995 – Portugal, Spain
- Phrurolithus C. L. Koch, 1839 – Morocco, Asia, Europe, Cuba, Hispaniola, United States. Introduced to Canada
- Phrurotimpus Chamberlin & Ivie, 1935 – China, North America
- Piabuna Chamberlin & Ivie, 1933 – Mexico, United States
- Plynnon Deeleman-Reinhold, 2001 – China, Indonesia, Borneo
- Punctus Mu & Zhang, 2023 – China
- Scotinella Banks, 1911 – North America
- Xiaoliguang Lin & Li, 2023 – Vietnam
- Xilithus Liu & Li, 2023 – China, Japan
